= List of Hoya species =

As of April 2026, Plants of the World Online accepts the following 562 species and one hybrid in the genus Hoya.

== A ==
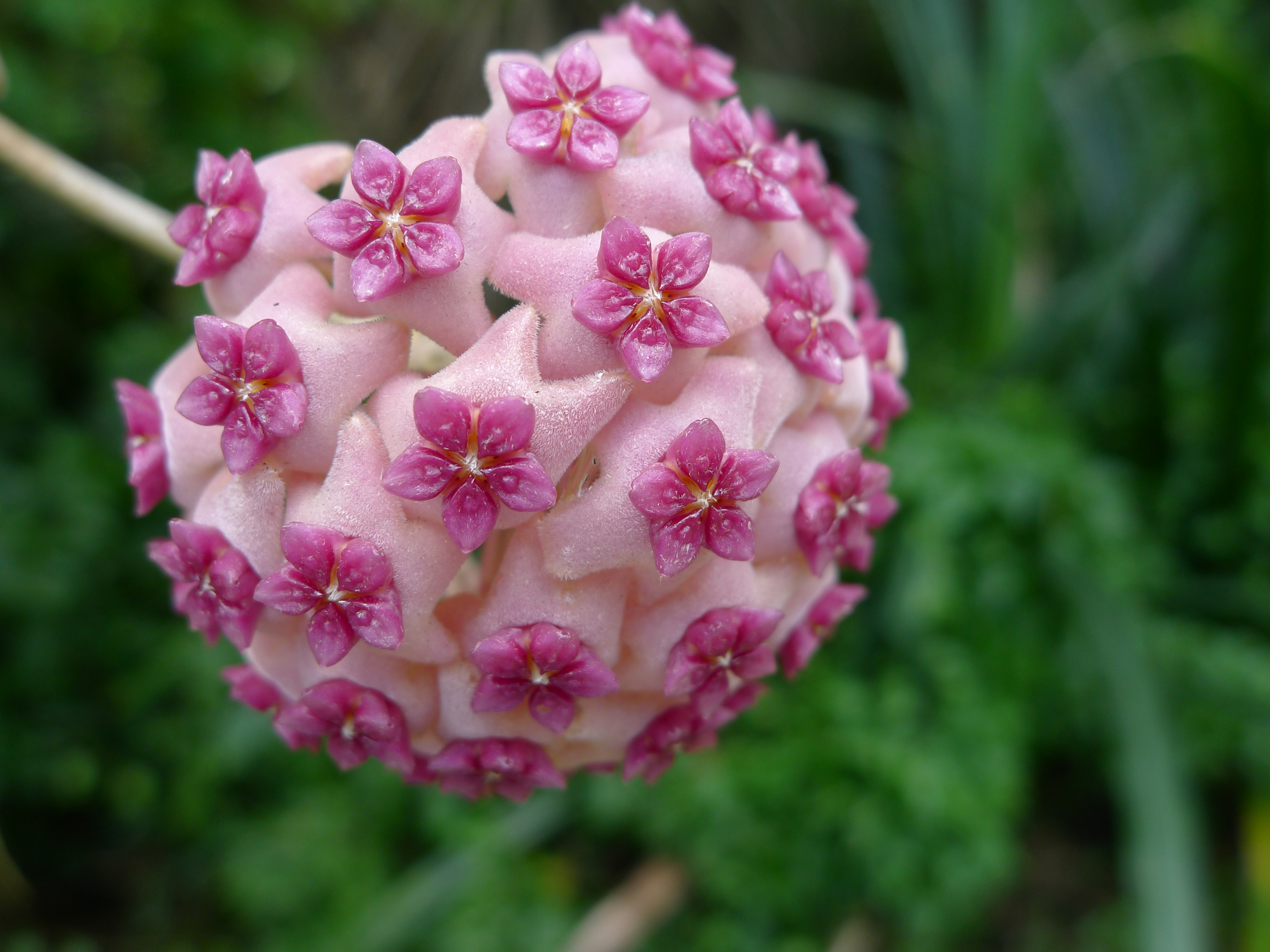
Hoya aldrichii

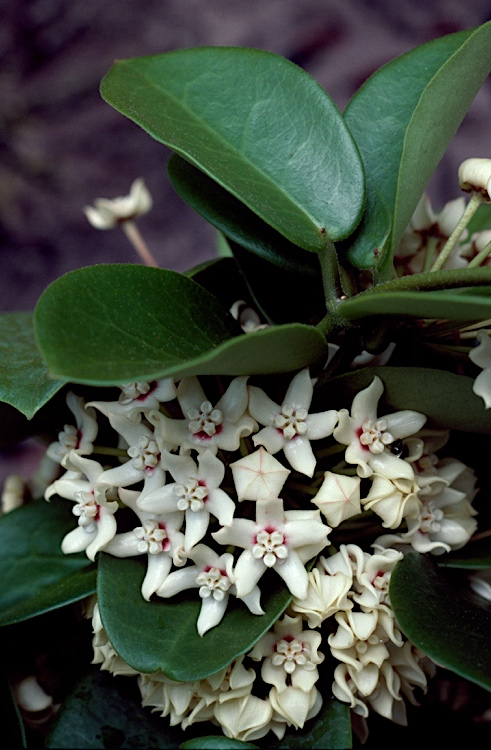
Hoya australis

- Hoya acanthominima Kloppenb.,, G.Mend. & Ferreras – Philippines
- Hoya acicularis T.Green & Kloppenb. – Borneo (Sabah, Brunei)
- Hoya acuminata (Wight) Benth. ex Hook.f. – E. Himalaya to Myanmar
- Hoya aeschynanthoides Schltr. – Borneo
- Hoya affinis Hemsl. – Solomon Islands
- Hoya agusanensis Kloppenb. – Philippines
- Hoya alagensis Kloppenb. – Philippines
- Hoya albida Kloppenb. – Philippines
- Hoya albiflora (Blume) Zipp. ex K.Schum. – Papua New Guinea
- Hoya aldrichii Hemsl. – Christmas Island
- Hoya alexicaca (Jacq.) Moon – E. & S. India to Myanmar
- Hoya alwitriana Kloppenb. – Philippines
- Hoya amboinensis Warb. – Maluku (Ambon)
- Hoya ambrosiae Kloppenb. – Philippines
- Hoya amicabilis S.Rahayu & Rodda. – Java
- Hoya amorosoae T.Green & Kloppenb. – Philippines
- Hoya amrita Kloppenb. – Philippines (Mindanao)
- Hoya andalensis Kloppenb. – Sumatera
- Hoya annaleesoligamiae Kloppenb. – Philippines
- Hoya anncajanoae Kloppenb. & Siar – Philippines (Luzon)
- Hoya antilaoensis Kloppenb. – Philippines
- Hoya anulata Schltr. – New Guinea, North Queensland, Maluku Islands
- Hoya aphylla Aver. – Laos
- Hoya apoda S.Moore – New Guinea
- Hoya apoensis Kloppenb. & Siar – Philippines
- Hoya archboldiana C.Norman – New Guinea
- Hoya ariffinii S.Rahayu & Rodda. – Borneo
- Hoya arnottiana Wight – C. Himalaya to Indo-China
- Hoya artwhistleri Kloppenb. – Samoa (Upolu)
- Hoya aurantiaca Kloppenb., Siar & Cajano – Philippines
- Hoya aurigueana Kloppenb. – Philippines
- Hoya australis R.Br. ex J.Traill – N. Borneo, New Guinea to SW. Pacific

== B ==
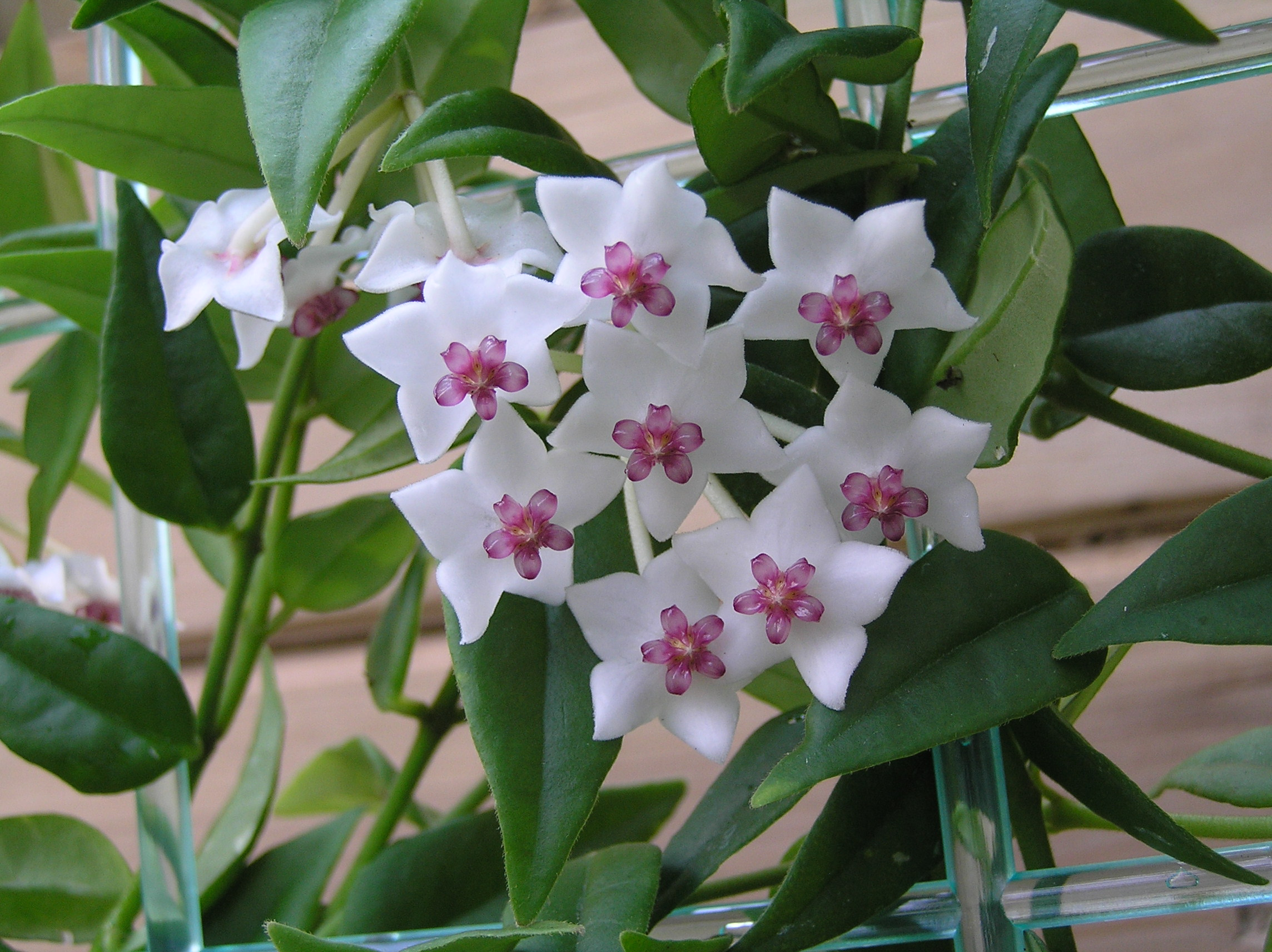
Hoya bella

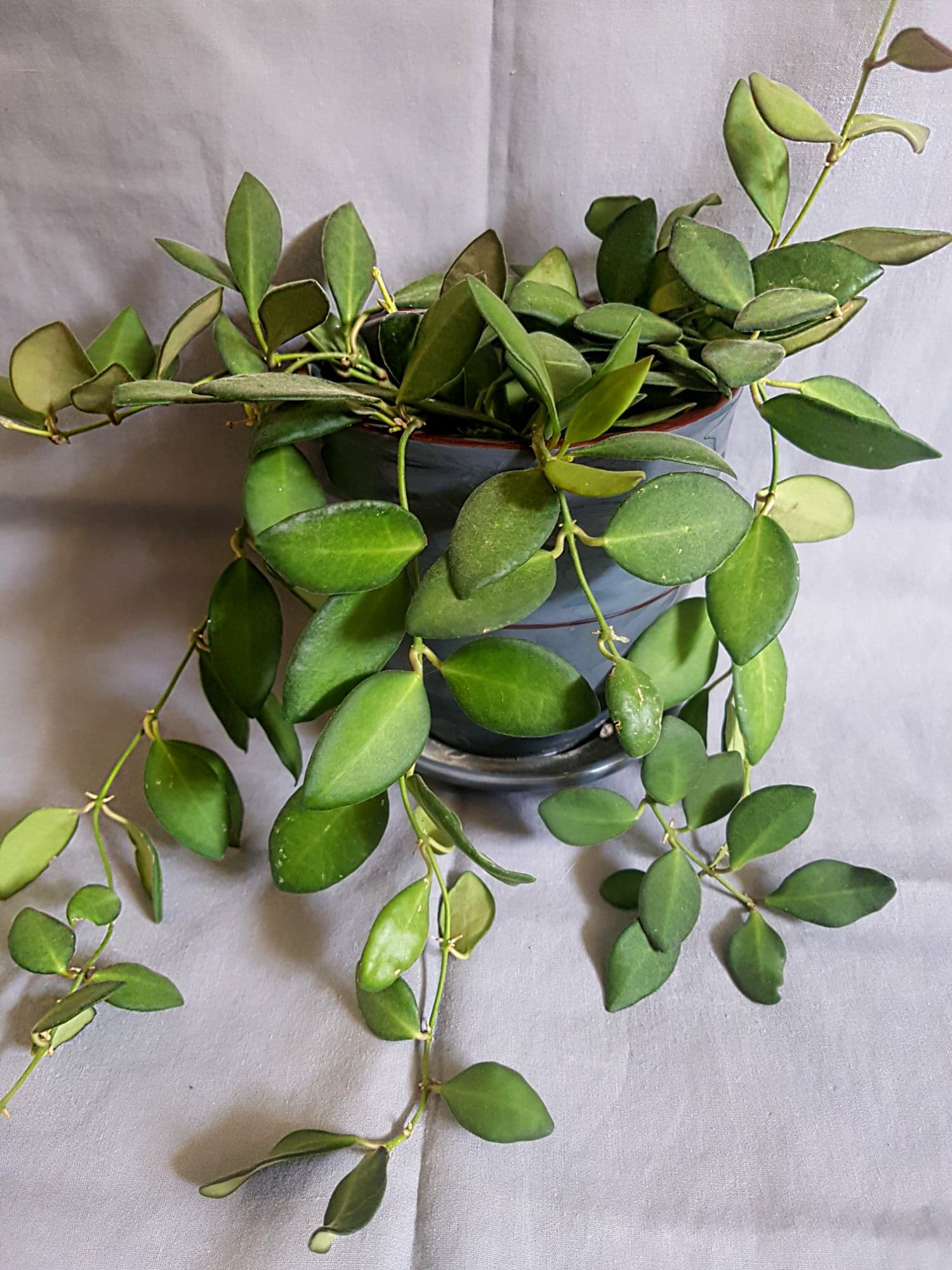
Hoya bilobata

- Hoya bacunganensis Kloppenb. – Philippines
- Hoya baguioensis Kloppenb. – Philippines
- Hoya baishaensis S.Y.He & P.T.Li – SE. China to Hainan
- Hoya bakoensis Rodda – Borneo (Sarawak)
- Hoya balaensis Kidyoo & Thaithong – Thailand
- Hoya bandaensis Schltr. – Maluku
- Hoya bandongii Kloppenb. & Ferreras – Philippines
- Hoya barbonii Kloppenb. – Philippines
- Hoya batutikarensis R.P.P.Ahmad, S.Rahayu & Rodda – Philippines
- Hoya bauensis T.Green – Borneo
- Hoya bebsguevarrae T.Green – Philippines
- Hoya beccarii Rodda & Simonsson – W. Malesia
- Hoya bella Hook. – Assam (Manipur) to Myanmar
- Hoya benchaii Gavrus – Borneo (Sabah)
- Hoya benguetensis Schltr. – Philippines (Luzon)
- Hoya benitotanii Kloppenb. – Philippines
- Hoya benstoneana Kloppenb. – Philippines
- Hoya benvergarae Kloppenb. & Siar – Philippines
- Hoya betchei (Schltr.) W.A.Whistler – Samoa
- Hoya bhutanica Grierson & D.G.Long – S. Bhutan
- Hoya bicknellii Kloppenb. – Philippines
- Hoya bicolensis Kloppenb. – Philippines
- Hoya bicolor Kloppenb. – Philippines
- Hoya bifunda Kloppenb. – Philippines
- Hoya bilobata Schltr. – Philippines
- Hoya blashernaezii Kloppenb. – Philippines
- Hoya bonii Costantin – Vietnam
- Hoya bordenii Schltr. – Philippines
- Hoya borneoensis Kloppenb. – Borneo (Sarawak)
- Hoya boycei Rodda & S.Rahayu – Borneo
- Hoya brassii P.I.Forst. & Liddle ex Simonsson & Rodda – W. New Guinea
- Hoya brevialata Kleijn & Donkelaar – Sulawesi
- Hoya brittonii Kloppenb. – Philippines
- Hoya brooksii Ridl. – Sumatera
- Hoya buntokensis S.Rahayu & Rodda – Borneo
- Hoya buotii Kloppenb. – Philippines
- Hoya burmanica Rolfe – SE. Assam to N. Indo-China
- Hoya burtoniae Kloppenb. – Philippines (Luzon)
- Hoya buruensis Miq. – Maluku (Buru)
- Hoya butleriana Kloppenb. – Philippines

== C ==
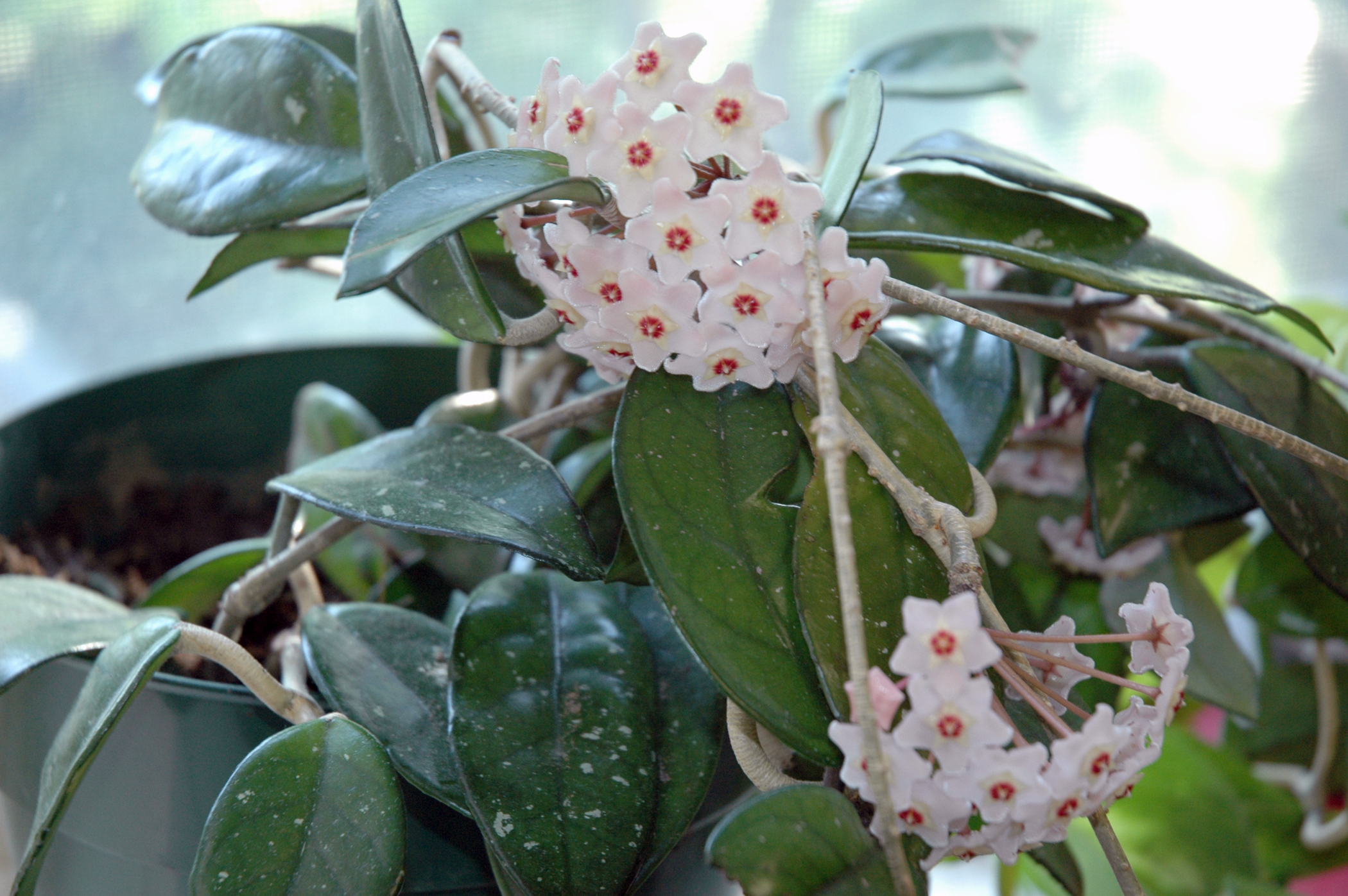
Hoya carnosa

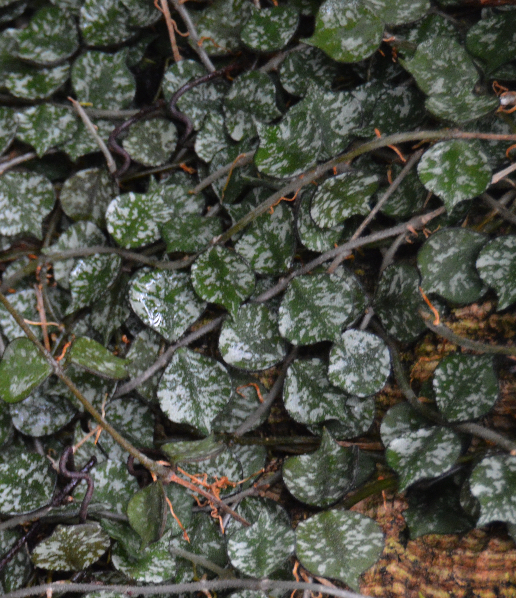
Hoya curtisii

- Hoya cagayanensis C.M.Burton – Philippines (Luzon)
- Hoya callistophylla T.Green – Borneo
- Hoya calycina Schltr. – New Guinea to Bismarck Arch
- Hoya calyxminuta Kloppenb. – Philippines
- Hoya campanulata Blume – W. Malesia
- Hoya camphorifolia Warb. – Philippines
- Hoya capotoanensis Kloppenb. – Philippines
- Hoya carandangiana Kloppenb. & Siar – Philippines
- Hoya cardiophylla Merr. – Philippines
- Hoya carmelae Kloppenb. – Philippines
- Hoya carnosa (L.f.) R.Br. – S. China to Laos, Japan (S. Kyushu) to Taiwan
- Hoya carrii P.I.Forst. & Liddle ex Simonsson & Rodda – Papua New Guinea
- Hoya caudata Hook.f. – S. Thailand to W. Malesia
- Hoya celata Kloppenb. – Philippines
- Hoya celsa Kloppenb. – Philippines
- Hoya cembra Kloppenb. – Philippines
- Hoya chewiorum A.L.Lamb – Borneo (Sabah)
- Hoya chiekoae Kloppenb. – Philippines
- Hoya chinghungensis (Y.Tsiang & P.T.Li) M.G.Gilbert – China (S. Yunnan) to Indo-China
- Hoya chloroleuca Schltr. – New Guinea
- Hoya chunii P.T.Li – New Guinea
- Hoya ciliata Elmer ex C.M.Burton – Philippines
- Hoya clemensiorum T.Green – Borneo
- Hoya collettii Schltr. – Myanmar
- Hoya collina Schltr. – New Guinea
- Hoya columna Kloppenb. – Philippines
- Hoya commutata M.G.Gilbert & P.T.Li – China (Guangxi) to Myanmar
- Hoya concava Kloppenb. – Philippines
- Hoya corazoniae Kloppenb. – Philippines
- Hoya cordata P.T.Li & S.Z.Huang – China (Guangxi)
- Hoya coriacea Blume – Thailand to Malesia
- Hoya corneri Rodda & S.Rahayu – Thailand to Pen. Malaysia, Borneo
- Hoya corollimarginata Kloppenb. – Samoa
- Hoya corollivillosa Kloppenb. – Philippines (Luzon)
- Hoya coronaria Blume – Thailand to W. & C. Malesia
- Hoya corymbosa Rodda & Simonsson – Borneo
- Hoya crassicaulis Elmer ex Kloppenb. – Philippines
- Hoya crassior Hochr. – Samoa
- Hoya crassipetiolata Aver. – Vietnam
- Hoya cumingiana Decne. – Borneo, Jawa, Philippines
- Hoya cupula Kloppenb. – Philippines
- Hoya curtisii King & Gamble – Thailand to Pen. Malaysia, Borneo, Philippines
- Hoya cutis-porcelana W.Suarez – Philippines

== D ==
- Hoya daimenglongensis Shao Y.He & P.T.Li – China (Yunnan)
- Hoya danumensis Rodda & Nyhuus – Sumatera, Borneo
- Hoya dasyantha Tsiang – Hainan
- Hoya davidcummingii Kloppenb. – Philippines (S. Luzon)
- Hoya decipulae S.Rahayu & Astuti – Sumatera
- Hoya deleoniorum Cabactulan – Philippines
- Hoya dennisii P.I.Forst. & Liddle – Solomon Islands
- Hoya densifolia Turcz. – Jawa, Philippines
- Hoya desvoeuxensis T.Green & Kloppenb. – Fiji
- Hoya devogelii Rodda & Simonsson – Borneo (Sarawak)
- Hoya deykei T.Green – Sumatera
- Hoya dickasoniana P.T.Li – Myanmar
- Hoya dictyoneura K.Schum. – New Guinea
- Hoya dimorpha F.M.Bailey – New Guinea
- Hoya diptera Seem. – Vanuatu, Fiji
- Hoya dischorensis Schltr. – New Guinea
- Hoya diversifolia Blume – Hainan, Indo-China to Malesia
- Hoya dolichosparte Schltr. – Sulawesi
- Hoya domaensis Rodda & Simonsson – New Guinea
- Hoya dulitensis Rodda & S.Rahayu – Borneo

== E ==
- Hoya eburnea Kloppenb. – Philippines
- Hoya edanoi C.M.Burton – Philippines
- Hoya edeni King ex Hook.f. – Nepal to Assam
- Hoya edholmiana Simonsson & Rodda – Papua New Guinea
- Hoya eitapensis Schltr. – NE. New Guinea
- Hoya elegans Kostel. – Maluku
- Hoya elliptica Hook.f. – Thailand to W. Malesia
- Hoya elmeri Merr. – Borneo (Sabah), Philippines (Luzon)
- Hoya endauensis Kiew – Pen. Malaysia (Johore)
- Hoya engleriana Hosseus – Indo-China
- Hoya epedunculata Schltr. – New Guinea
- Hoya erythrina Rintz – Vietnam, Pen. Malaysia
- Hoya erythrostemma Kerr – Indo-China
- Hoya espaldoniana Kloppenb. – Philippines
- Hoya estrellaensis T.Green & Kloppenb. – Philippines
- Hoya eumbeitii Kloppenb. – Philippines
- Hoya evelinae Simonsson & Rodda – Papua New Guinea
- Hoya excavata Teijsm. & Binn. – Sulawesi to Maluku
- Hoya exilis Schltr. – New Guinea

== F ==
- Hoya faoensis Kloppenb. & Siar – Samoa
- Hoya fauziana Rodda – Borneo (Sabah)
- Hoya ferrerasii Kloppenb. & Siar – Philippines
- Hoya fetuana Kloppenb. – Samoa
- Hoya filiformis Rech. – Samoa
- Hoya finlaysonii Wight – S. Thailand to W. Malesia
- Hoya fischeriana Warb. – Philippines
- Hoya fitchii Kloppenb. – Philippines
- Hoya fitoensis Kloppenb. – Samoa
- Hoya flavescens Schltr. – New Guinea
- Hoya flavida P.I.Forst. & Liddle – Solomon Islands
- Hoya forbesii King & Gamble – W. Malesia
- Hoya foxii Kloppenb. – Philippines
- Hoya frakeii Kloppenb. – Philippines
- Hoya fraterna Blume – Borneo (Sabah), Jawa
- Hoya fungii Merr. – China (Yunnan to Guangdong) to Indo-China
- Hoya fusca Wall. – Himalaya to S. China and Indo-China

== G ==
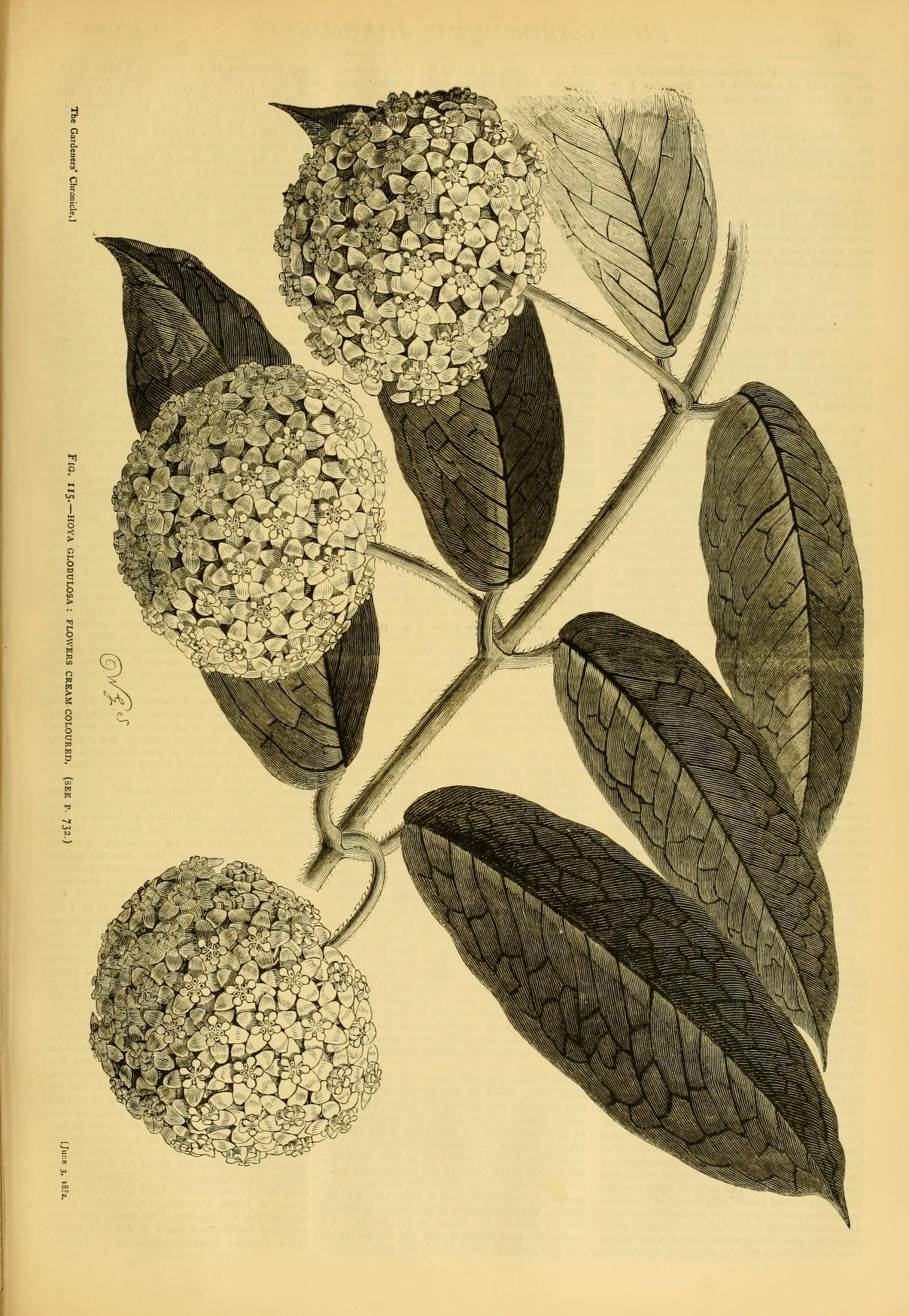
Hoya globulosa

- Hoya galenii Kloppenb. – Philippines
- Hoya galeraensis Kloppenb. – Philippines
- Hoya gaoligongensis M.X.Zhao & Y.H.Tan
- Hoya garciae Kloppenb. – Philippines
- Hoya gauttierensis Rodda & Simonsson – New Guinea
- Hoya gelba Kloppenb. – Philippines
- Hoya gigantanganensis Kloppenb. – Philippines (Leyte)
- Hoya gigas Schltr. – New Guinea
- Hoya gildingii Kloppenb. – Borneo (Sabah)
- Hoya glabra Schltr. – Sumatera, N. & NW. Borneo
- Hoya globulifera Blume – New Guinea
- Hoya globulosa Hook.f. – Himalaya to China (Yunnan to Guangdong) and Indo-China
- Hoya golamcoana Kloppenb. – Philippines (Palawan)
- Hoya gracilipes Schltr. – New Guinea
- Hoya gracilis Schltr. – Sulawesi
- Hoya greenii Kloppenb. – Philippines (Mindanao)
- Hoya gretheri Kloppenb. – Philippines
- Hoya griffithii Hook.f. – Assam to Hainan
- Hoya guppyi Oliv. – Solomon Islands
- Hoya gutierrezii Kloppenb. – Philippines

== H ==
- Hoya hainanensis Merr. – Hainan, Vietnam
- Hoya halconensis Kloppenb. – Philippines
- Hoya halophila Schltr. – NE. New Guinea to Solomon Islands
- Hoya hamiltoniorum A.L.Lamb – N. Borneo (C. & S. Crocker Range)
- Hoya hanhiae V.T.Pham & Aver. – Vietnam
- Hoya hernaezii Kloppenb. – Philippines
- Hoya heuschkeliana Kloppenb. – Philippines
- Hoya histora Kloppenb. – Philippines
- Hoya hongleniae Aver., Vuong, Bao & V.C.Nguyen
- Hoya hypolasia Schltr. – Papua New Guinea

== I ==
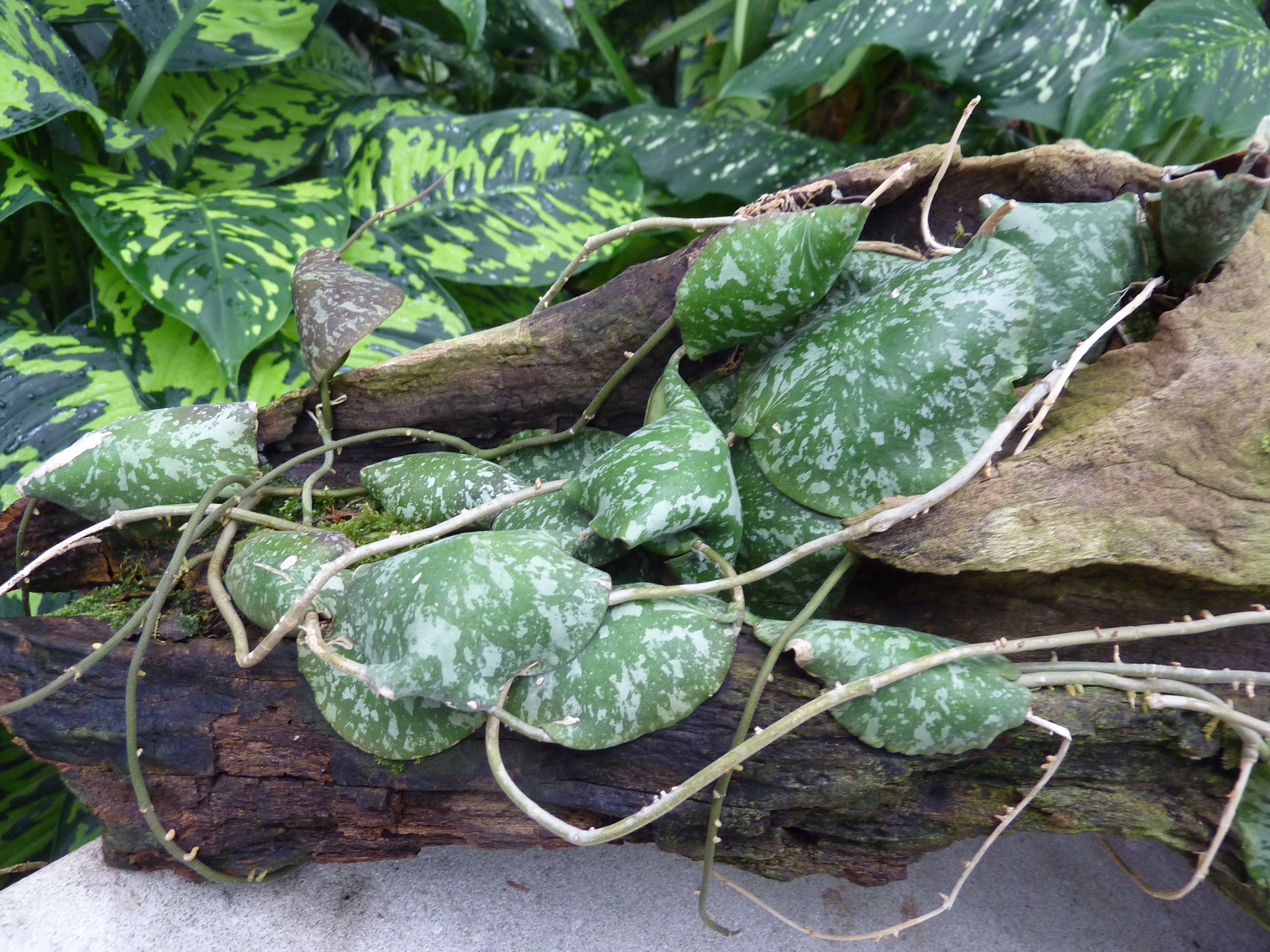
Hoya imbricata

- Hoya ignorata T.B.Tran – Indo-China to Pen. Malaysia, Borneo
- Hoya ilagiorum Kloppenb. – Philippines
- Hoya imbricata Decne. – Philippines to Sulawesi
- Hoya imperialis Lindl. – Pen. Thailand to W. & C. Malesia
- Hoya inconspicua Hemsl. – New Guinea to Vanuatu and Queensland
- Hoya incrassata Warb. – Philippines
- Hoya incurvula Schltr. – Sulawesi
- Hoya indaysarae M.N.Medina – Philippines (Dinagat)
- Hoya infantalensis Kloppenb. – Philippines
- Hoya inflata (P.I.Forst. – Papua New Guinea
- Hoya insularis Rodda & S.Rahayu – Borneo
- Hoya irisiae Ferreras – Philippines
- Hoya isabelaensis Kloppenb. – Philippines
- Hoya isabelchanae Rodda & Simonsson – Sulawesi
- Hoya ischnopus Schltr. – New Guinea

== J–K ==
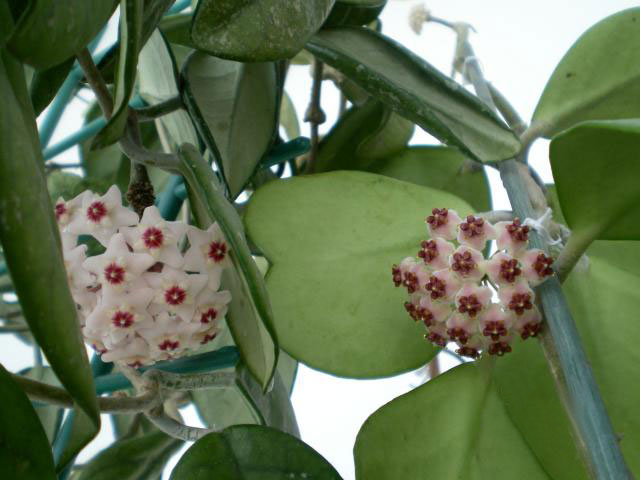
Hoya kerrii

- Hoya jianfenglingensis Shao Y.He & P.T.Li – Hainan
- Hoya jiewhoeana Rodda – Borneo (Sabah)
- Hoya josetteae M.N.Medina & Kloppenb. – Philippines
- Hoya juannguoana Kloppenb. – Philippines
- Hoya juhoneweana Simonsson & Rodda – Papua New Guinea
- Hoya kachinensis Rodda & K.Armstr. – Myanmar
- Hoya kaikoana S.Rahayu & Rodda – Borneo
- Hoya kanlaonensis Kloppenb. – Philippines
- Hoya kanyakumariana A.N.Henry & Swamin. – India (Tamil Nadu)
- Hoya kapuasensis S.Rahayu & Rodda – Borneo
- Hoya kastbergii Kloppenb. – Borneo (Sarawak), Sulawesi
- Hoya kenejiana Schltr. – New Guinea
- Hoya kentiana C.M.Burton – Philippines (Luzon)
- Hoya kerangasensis Rodda & S.Rahayu – Borneo
- Hoya kerrii Craib – Indo-China to W. Malesia. (36) ch
- Hoya kingdonwardii P.T.Li – Myanmar
- Hoya kipandiensis Gavrus – Borneo (Sabah)
- Hoya kloppenburgii T.Green – Borneo (Sabah, Brunei)
- Hoya klossii S.Moore – New Guinea
- Hoya koteka Simonsson & Rodda – W. New Guinea
- Hoya krohniana Kloppenb. & Siar – Philippines
- Hoya krusenstierniana Simonsson & Rodda – Papua New Guinea
- Hoya kuhlii (Blume) Koord. – W. Jawa

== L ==
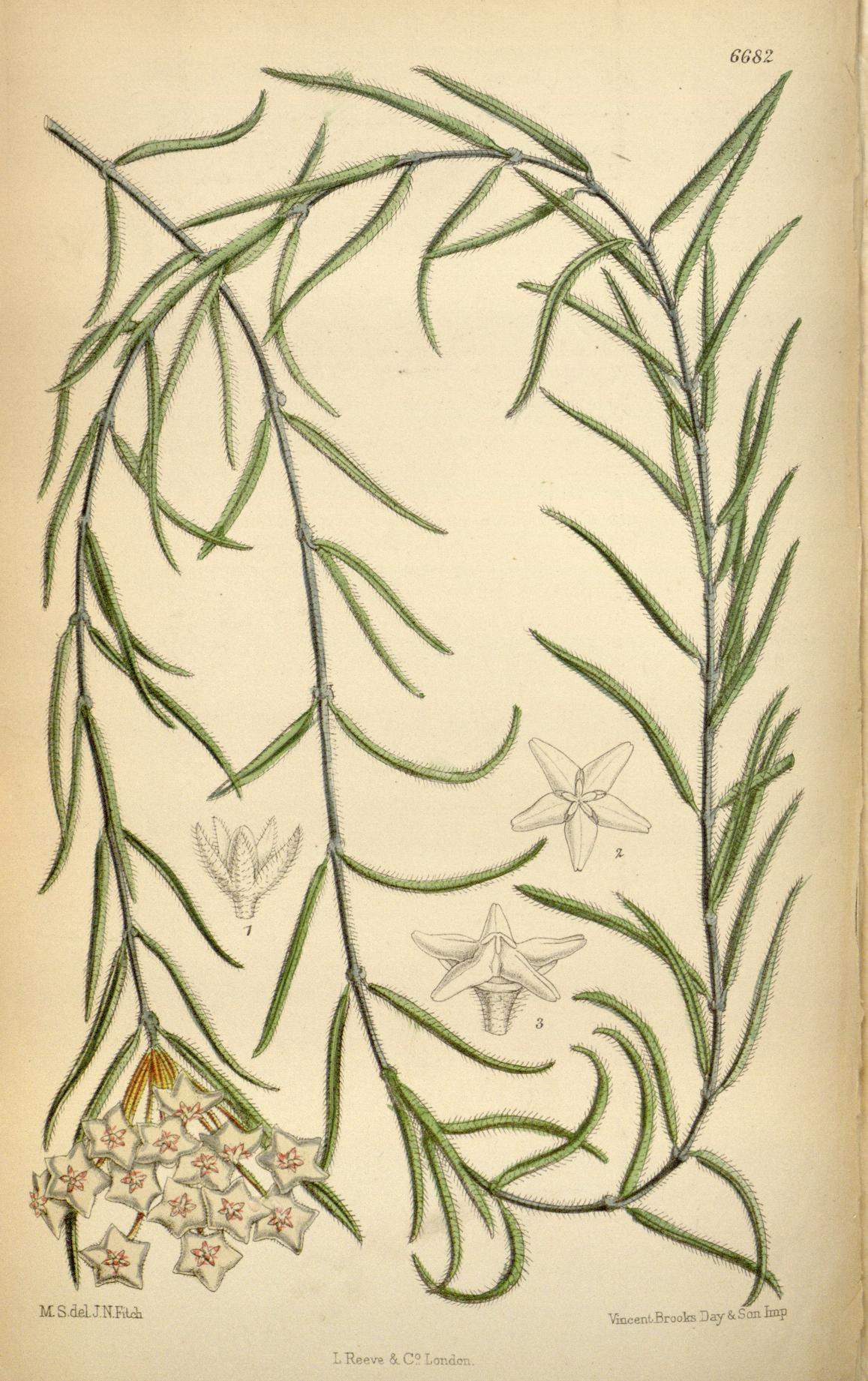
Hoya linearis

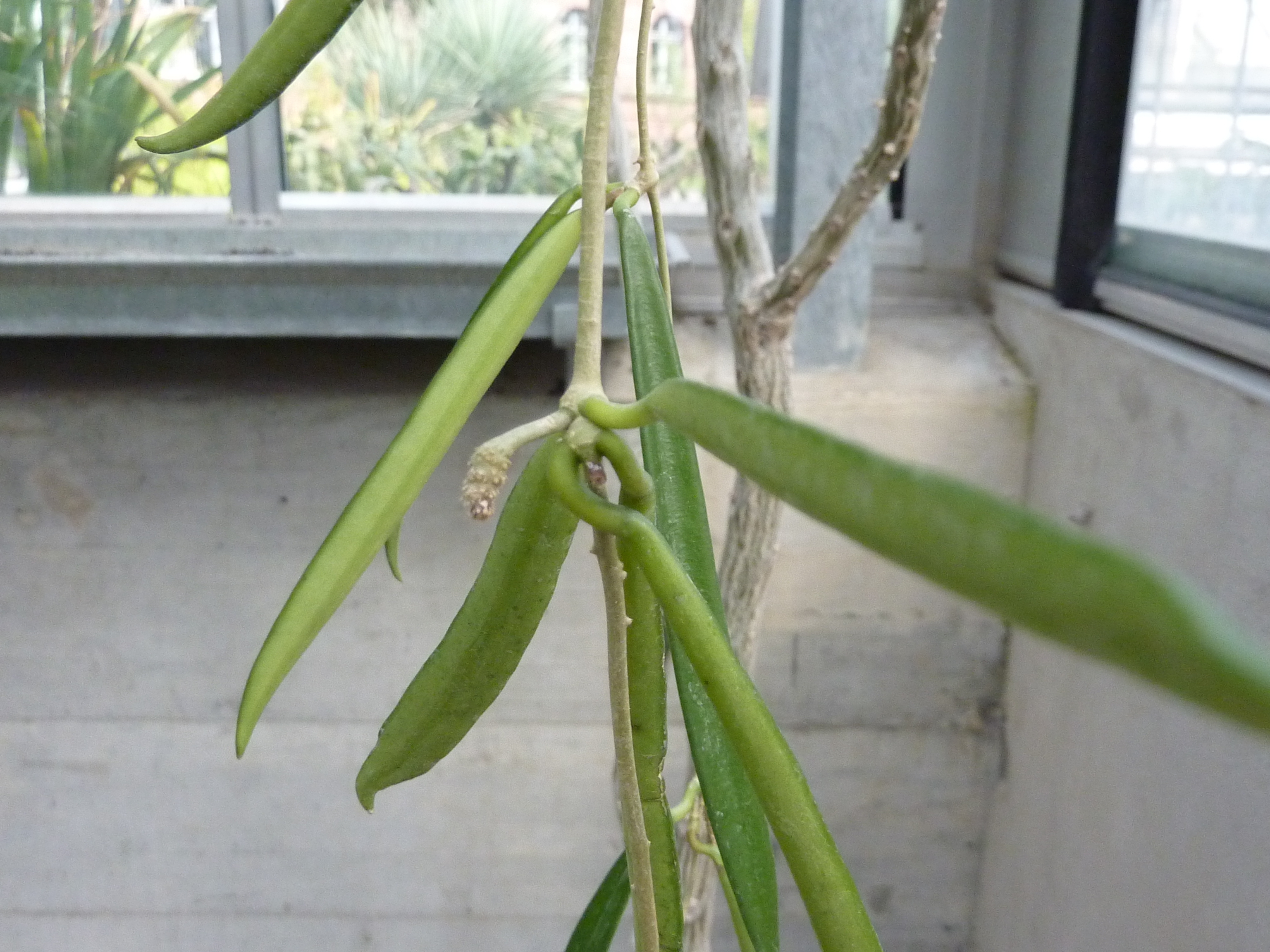
Hoya longifolia

- Hoya lactea S.Moore – New Guinea
- Hoya lacunosa Blume – Thailand to W. & C. Malesia. (36) ch
- Hoya lagunaensis Kloppenb. – Philippines
- Hoya lambii T.Green – Borneo (Sabah)
- Hoya lambioae Kloppenb. – Philippines
- Hoya lamingtoniae F.M.Bailey – New Guinea
- Hoya lamthanhiae V.T.Pham & Kloppenb. – Vietnam
- Hoya lanataiensis Kloppenb. – Samoa (Upolu)
- Hoya lanceolaria S.Moore – New Guinea
- Hoya lanceolata Wall. ex D.Don – Himalaya to Indo-China
- Hoya landgrantensis Kloppenb. – Philippines
- Hoya lanotooensis Kloppenb. – Samoa
- Hoya larrycahilogii Medina & Kloppenb. – Philippines
- Hoya lasiantha Korth. ex Blume – Thailand to W. Malesia
- Hoya lasiogynostegia P.T.Li – Hainan (Diaoluoshan)
- Hoya latifolia G.Don – Myanmar to W. Malesia
- Hoya laurifoliopsis Hochr. – Jawa
- Hoya lauterbachii K.Schum. – New Guinea
- Hoya leembruggeniana Koord. – Jawa
- Hoya leucantha S.Moore – New Guinea
- Hoya leucorhoda Schltr. – New Guinea
- Hoya leytensis Elmer ex C.M.Burton – Philippines (Leyte)
- Hoya liddleana Simonsson & Rodda – New Guinea
- Hoya linapauliana Kloppenb. – Philippines (Luzon)
- Hoya linavergarae Kloppenb. & Siar – Philippines
- Hoya linearis Wall. ex D.Don – Nepal to China (NW. Yunnan) and Indo-China
- Hoya lipoensis P.T.Li & Z.R.Xu – China (Guizhou)
- Hoya lithophytica Kidyoo – Thailand
- Hoya lobbii Hook.f. – Assam, Thailand to Cambodia
- Hoya lockii V.T.Pham & Aver. – Vietnam
- Hoya loheri Kloppenb. – Philippines
- Hoya longicalyx Wang Hui & E.F.Huang – China South-Central
- Hoya longifolia Wall. ex Wight – Himalaya to China (Yunnan) and Nicobar Islands
- Hoya longipedunculata V.T.Pham & Aver. – Vietnam
- Hoya longlingensis E.F.Huang – China South-Central
- Hoya loyceandrewsiana T.Green – N. Thailand to Vietnam
- Hoya luatekensis Kloppenb. – Samoa (NE. Savai'i)
- Hoya lucardenasiana Kloppenb. – Philippines
- Hoya lucida Simonsson & Rodda – New Guinea
- Hoya lucyae Kloppenb. & Siar – Philippines
- Hoya lutea Kostel. – Maluku
- Hoya lyi H.Lév. – China (Sichuan to Guangdong) and N. Indo-China

== M ==
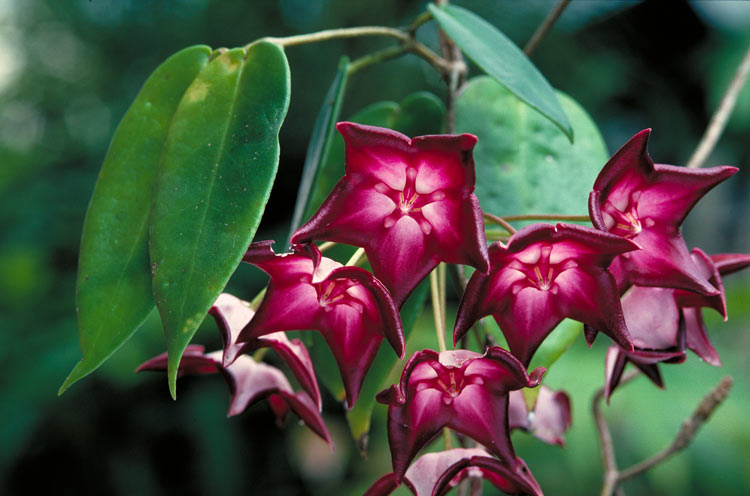
Hoya macgillivrayi

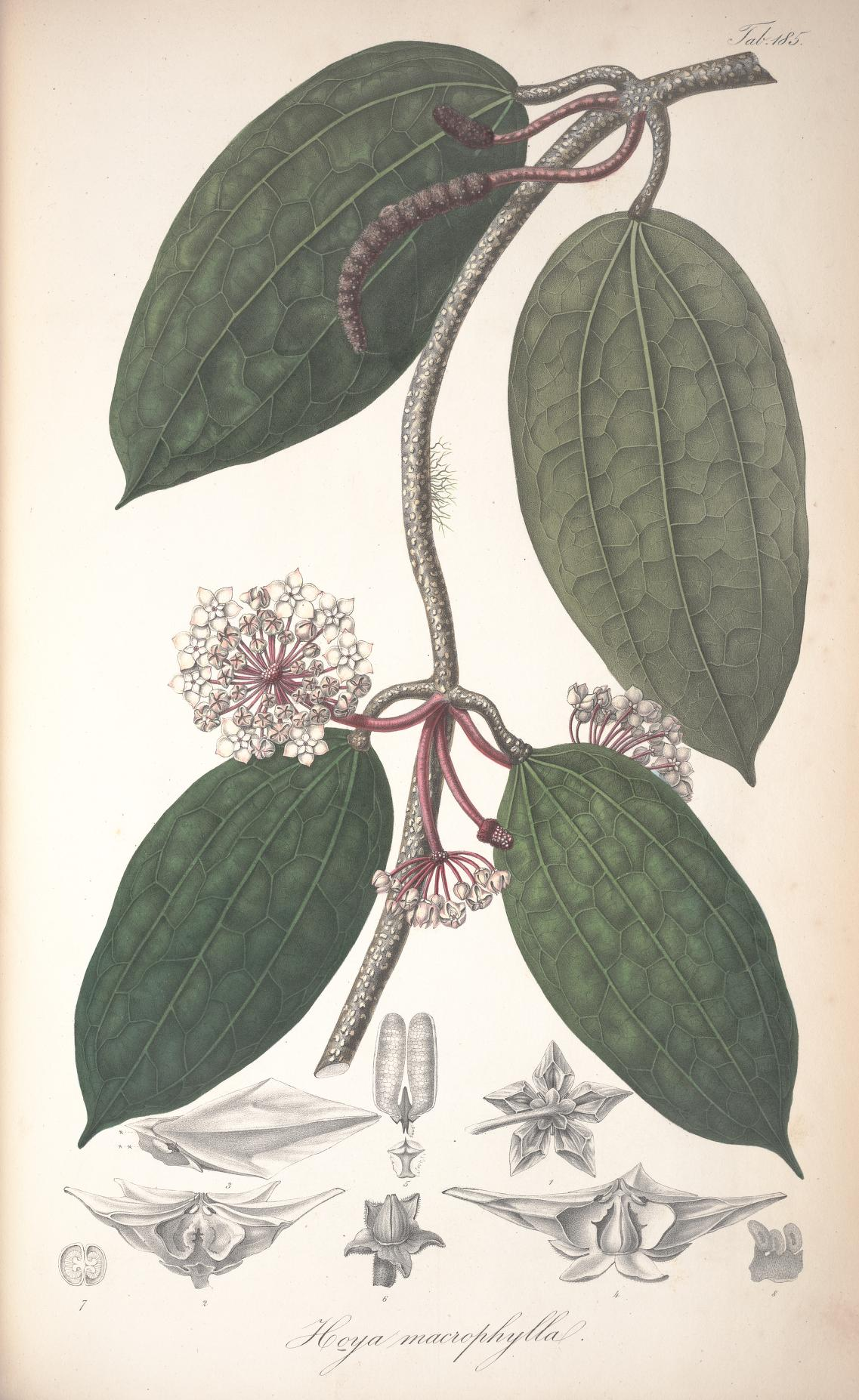
Hoya macrophylla

- Hoya macgillivrayi F.M.Bailey – N. Queensland
- Hoya macrophylla Blume – Borneo, Jawa to Lesser Sunda Islands
- Hoya madulidii Kloppenb. – Philippines (Mindanao)
- Hoya magnifica P.I.Forst. & Liddle – Papua New Guinea
- Hoya magniflora P.T.Li – Jawa
- Hoya mahaweeensis Kloppenb. – Philippines
- Hoya maingayi Hook.f. – Pen. Thailand to Pen. Malaysia
- Hoya malata Kloppenb. – Samoa (‘Upolu)
- Hoya mamasa S.Rahayu, R.P.P.Ahmad & Rodda – Sulawesi
- Hoya manipurensis Deb – Assam, Bangladesh, China South-Central, Myanmar, Nepal, Thailand
- Hoya mappigera Rodda & Simonsson – Thailand to Pen. Malaysia, Borneo (Sabah, Brunei)
- Hoya maquilingensis Kloppenb. – Philippines
- Hoya marananiae Kloppenb. – Philippines
- Hoya marginata Schltr. – Bismarck Arch. (New Britain)
- Hoya mariae (Schltr.) L.Wanntorp & Meve – Philippines
- Hoya martinii Kloppenb. & G.Mend. – Philippines
- Hoya marvinii Kloppenb. – Philippines
- Hoya mata-ole-afiensis Kloppenb. – Samoa
- Hoya matavanuensis Kloppenb. – Samoa
- Hoya matiensis Kloppenb. – Philippines
- Hoya maxima Teijsm. & Binn. – Sulawesi
- Hoya maximowayetii Kloppenb. – Philippines
- Hoya mcclurei Kloppenb. – Hainan
- Hoya mcgregorii Schltr. – Philippines (Mindoro)
- Hoya medinae Kloppenb. – Philippines
- Hoya medinillifolia Rodda & Simonsson – Borneo (Sabah, Sarawak)
- Hoya medusa M.Leon, Cabactulan, Cuerdo & Rodda – Philippines
- Hoya megalantha Turrill – Fiji
- Hoya megalaster Warb. ex K.Schum. & Lauterb. – New Guinea
- Hoya meliflua (Blanco) Merr. – Borneo (Sabah), Philippines
- Hoya memoria Kloppenb. – Philippines
- Hoya mengtzeensis Y.Tsiang & P.T.Li – China (S. Yunnan, Guangxi) to Vietnam
- Hoya meredithii T.Green – Borneo (Sabah, Sarawak)
- Hoya merrillii Schltr. – Philippines
- Hoya micrantha Hook.f. – Indo-China
- Hoya microphylla Schltr. – New Guinea
- Hoya microstemma Schltr. – NE. New Guinea
- Hoya migueldavidii Cabactulan – Philippines
- Hoya minahassae Schltr. – Sulawesi
- Hoya mindanaoensis Kloppenb. – Philippines
- Hoya mindorensis Schltr. – Philippines to N. & C. Borneo
- Hoya minima Costantin – Vietnam
- Hoya minutiflora Rodda & Simonsson – Borneo (Kalimantan)
- Hoya mirabilis Kidyoo – Thailand
- Hoya mitrata Kerr – Thailand to W. & C. Malesia
- Hoya monetteae T.Green – Borneo (Sabah), Philippines, Sulawesi
- Hoya moninae Kloppenb. & Cajano – Philippines
- Hoya montana Schltr. – New Guinea
- Hoya montelbanensis Kloppenb. – Philippines
- Hoya mucronulata Warb. – New Guinea
- Hoya multiflora Blume – China (Guangxi, Yunnan) to Trop. Asia
- Hoya myanmarica P.T.Li – Myanmar
- Hoya myrmecopa Kleijn & Donkelaar – Philippines, Sulawesi

== N ==
- Hoya nabawanensis Kloppenb. & Wiberg – Borneo (Sabah)
- Hoya nakarensis Kloppenb. – Philippines
- Hoya narcissiflora S.Rahayu & Rodda – Borneo (Kalimantan)
- Hoya naumannii Schltr. – Solomon Islands
- Hoya navicula Kloppenb. & G.Mend. – Philippines
- Hoya negrosensis Kloppenb. – Philippines
- Hoya neoebudica Guillaumin – Vanuatu
- Hoya neoguineensis Engl. – New Guinea
- Hoya nervosa Y.Tsiang & P.T.Li – China (S. Yunnan, Guangxi)
- Hoya nicholsoniae F.Muell. – New Caledonia, New Guinea, Queensland, Samoa, Solomon Is.
- Hoya nova Kloppenb. – Philippines
- Hoya nummularia Decne. ex Hook.f. – Assam to Indo-China
- Hoya nummularioides Costantin – Indo-China
- Hoya nutans Aver. & V.T.Pham – Vietnam
- Hoya nuttiana Rodda & Simonsson – Borneo (Sarawak)
- Hoya nuuuliensis Kloppenb. & Siar – Samoa
- Hoya nyhuusiae Kloppenb. – Borneo (Sabah, Brunei)
- Hoya nyingchiensis Y.W.Zuo & H.P.Deng – Tibet

== O ==
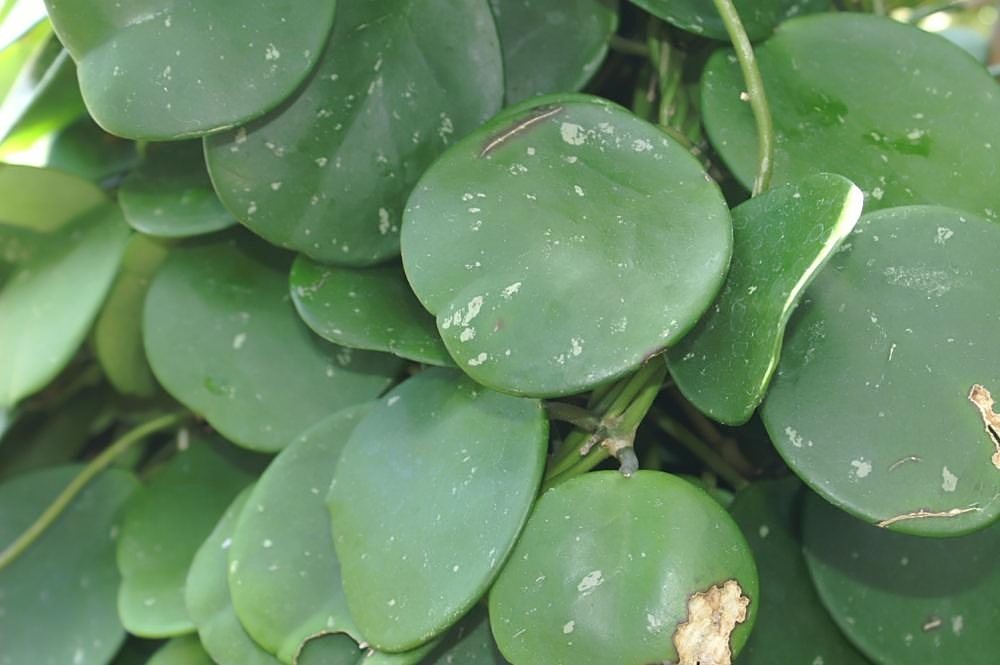
Hoya obovata

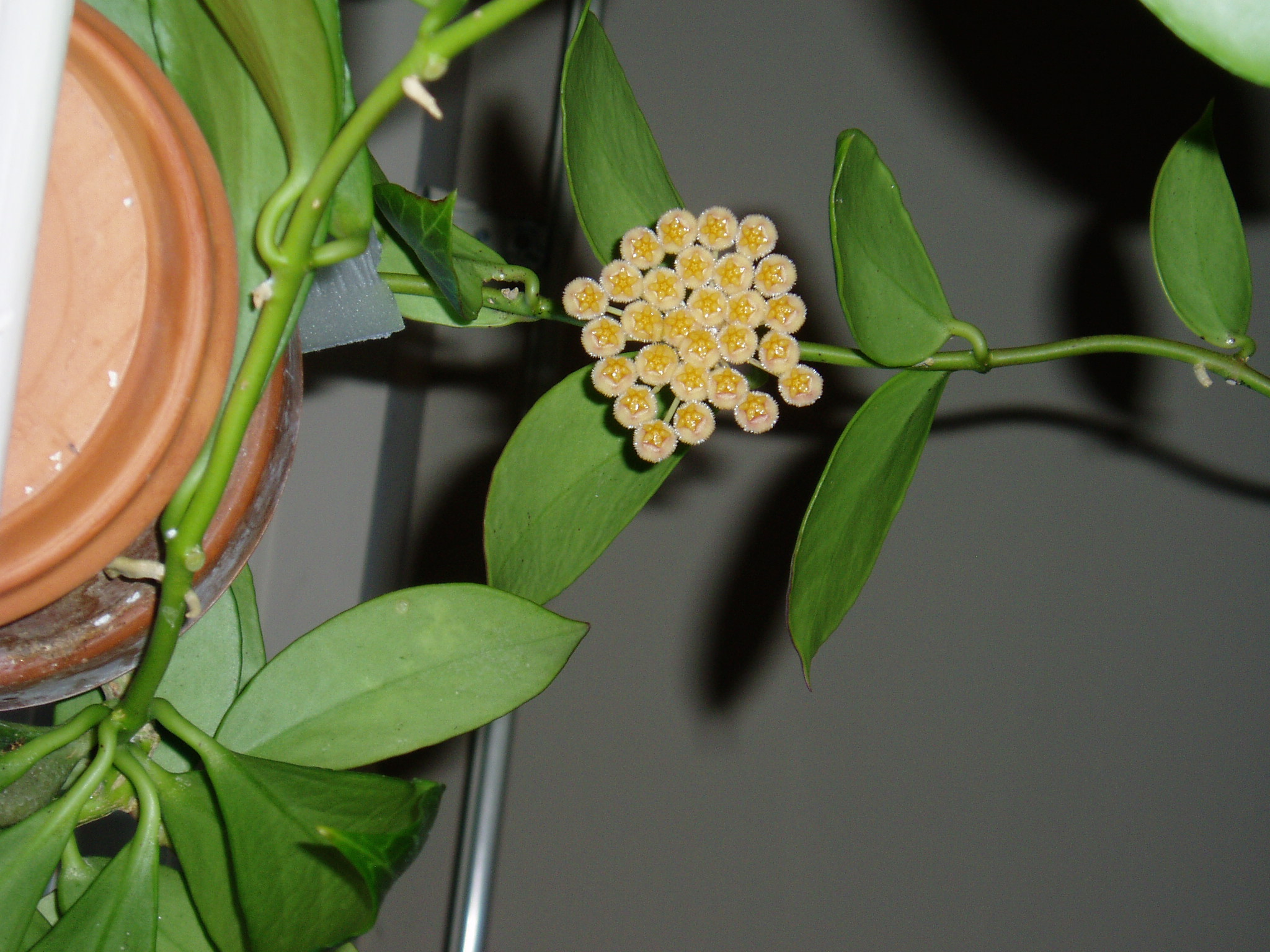
Hoya obscura

- Hoya obcordata Hook.f. – E. Himalaya
- Hoya oblanceolata Hook.f. – Assam, Sumatera
- Hoya oblongacutifolia Costantin – Thailand to S. Vietnam
- Hoya obovata Decne. – Indo-China, Sulawesi, Maluku
- Hoya obscura Elmer ex C.M.Burton – Borneo to Philippines
- Hoya obtusifolia Wight – Indo-China to W. Malesia
- Hoya occultata S.Rahayu & Rodda – Sulawesi
- Hoya odetteae Kloppenb. – Philippines (Mindanao)
- Hoya odorata Schltr. – Philippines
- Hoya ofuensis Kloppenb. – Samoa
- Hoya oleoides Schltr. – New Guinea
- Hoya oligantha Schltr. – New Guinea
- Hoya olosegaensis Kloppenb. – Samoa (Savai'i)
- Hoya omlorii (Livsh. & Meve) L.Wanntorp & Meve – Pen. Malaysia (Perak), Sumatera, Borneo (Sarawak)
- Hoya onychoides P.I.Forst. – Papua New Guinea
- Hoya oreogena Kerr – Thailand
- Hoya oreostemma Schltr. – New Guinea
- Hoya orientalis P.T.Li – Philippines
- Hoya ormocensis Kloppenb. – Philippines (Leyte)
- Hoya ottolanderi Koord. – Jawa
- Hoya ovalifolia Wight & Arn. – SW. & S. India, Sri Lanka
- Hoya oxycoccoides S.Moore – New Guinea

== P–Q ==
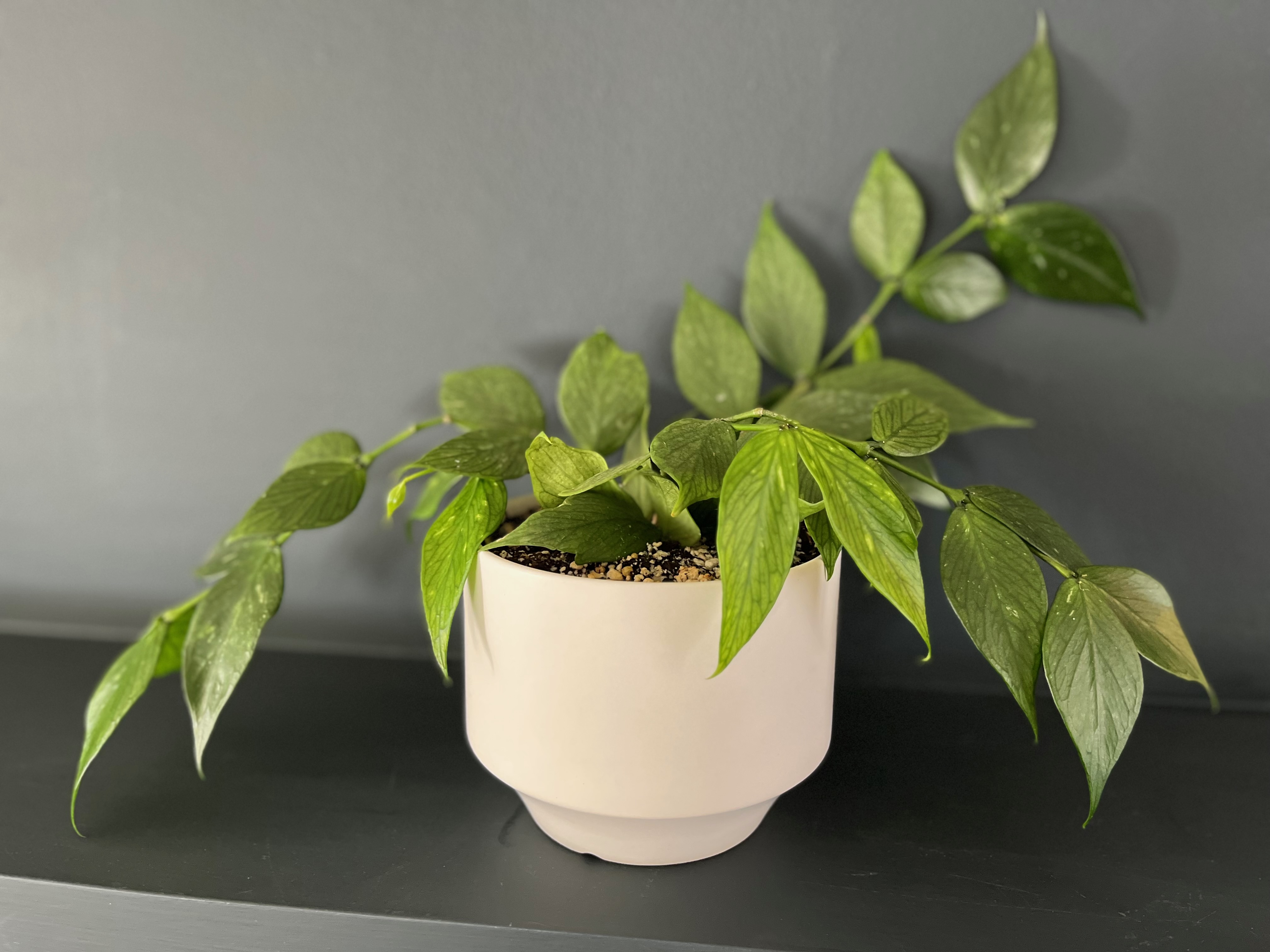
Hoya polyneura

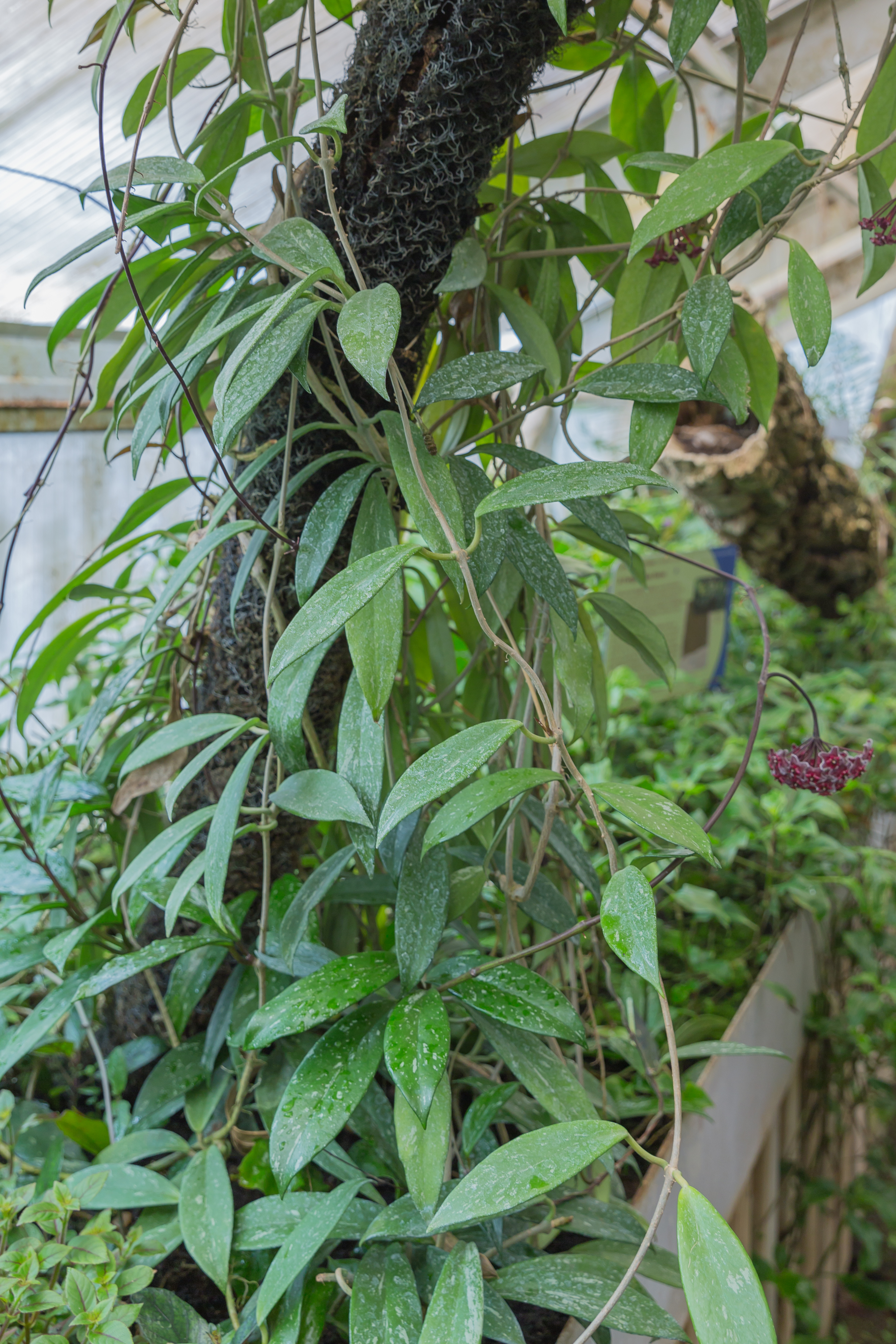
Hoya pubicalyx

- Hoya pachyclada Kerr – Indo-China
- Hoya pachyphylla K.Schum. & Lauterb. – New Guinea
- Hoya pachypus S.Moore – New Guinea
- Hoya palawanensis Kloppenb. – Philippines
- Hoya palawanica Kloppenb. – Philippines (Palawan)
- Hoya pallilimba Kleijn & Donkelaar – Sulawesi
- Hoya panayensis Kloppenb. & Siar – Philippines (Panay)
- Hoya pandurata Tsiang – China (S. Yunnan) to Indo-China
- Hoya papaschonii Rodda – Thailand
- Hoya papillantha K.Schum. – Bismarck Arch
- Hoya papuana (Schltr.) Schltr. – Papua New Guinea
- Hoya paradisea Simonsson & Rodda – New Guinea
- Hoya parvapollinia Kloppenb. & G.Mend. – Philippines
- Hoya parviflora Wight – Bangladesh to Sumatera
- Hoya parvifolia Schltr. – Sumatera
- Hoya patameaensis Kloppenb. – Samoa (Savai'i)
- Hoya patella Schltr. – New Guinea
- Hoya pauciflora Wight – SW. India, Sri Lanka
- Hoya paulshirleyi T.Green & Kloppenb. – Sulawesi
- Hoya paziae Kloppenb. – Philippines
- Hoya pedunculata (Warb.) Schltr. – NE. New Guinea
- Hoya peekelii Markgr. – Bismarck Arch
- Hoya peltata Rodda & S.Rahayu – Borneo
- Hoya peninsularis Rodda & Zakaria – Malaya
- Hoya pentaphlebia Merr. – Philippines
- Hoya perakensis Ridl. – Pen. Malaysia
- Hoya persicina Kloppenb. – Philippines
- Hoya phuluangensis Kidyoo – Thailand
- Hoya phuwuaensis Kidyoo – N. Thailand
- Hoya phyllura O.Schwartz – Borneo
- Hoya piestolepis Schltr. – New Guinea
- Hoya pimenteliana Kloppenb. – Philippines (Catanduanes)
- Hoya placerensis Kloppenb. – Philippines
- Hoya platycaulis Simonsson & Rodda – Philippines
- Hoya plicata King & Gamble – Pen. Malaysia
- Hoya polilloensis Kloppenb. – Philippines
- Hoya polyneura Hook.f. – E. Himalaya to China (NW. Yunnan)
- Hoya polypus S.Rahayu & Rodda – Borneo
- Hoya pruinosa (Blume) Miq. – New Guinea
- Hoya pseudobicolensis Kloppenb. – Philippines
- Hoya pseudoleytensis Kloppenb. – Philippines
- Hoya pubens Costantin – Vietnam
- Hoya puber Blume – Sumatera to W. Jawa, Borneo (Sabah, Kalimantan)
- Hoya pubicalyx Merr. – Philippines (Luzon)
- Hoya pubicenta Kloppenb. – Philippines
- Hoya pubicorolla Kloppenb. – Philippines
- Hoya pulchella Schltr. – New Guinea
- Hoya pulchra Aurigue & Cabactulan – Philippines
- Hoya pulleana Rodda & Simonsson – New Guinea
- Hoya purpurea Blume – New Guinea
- Hoya pusilla Rintz – Pen. Malaysia (Pahang)
- Hoya pusilliflora S.Moore – New Guinea
- Hoya pyrifolia E.F.Huang – China South-Central
- Hoya querinoensis Kloppenb. & Siar – Philippines
- Hoya quinquenervia Warb. – Philippines (Luzon)
- Hoya quisumbingii Kloppenb. – Philippines (Itbayat Island)

== R ==
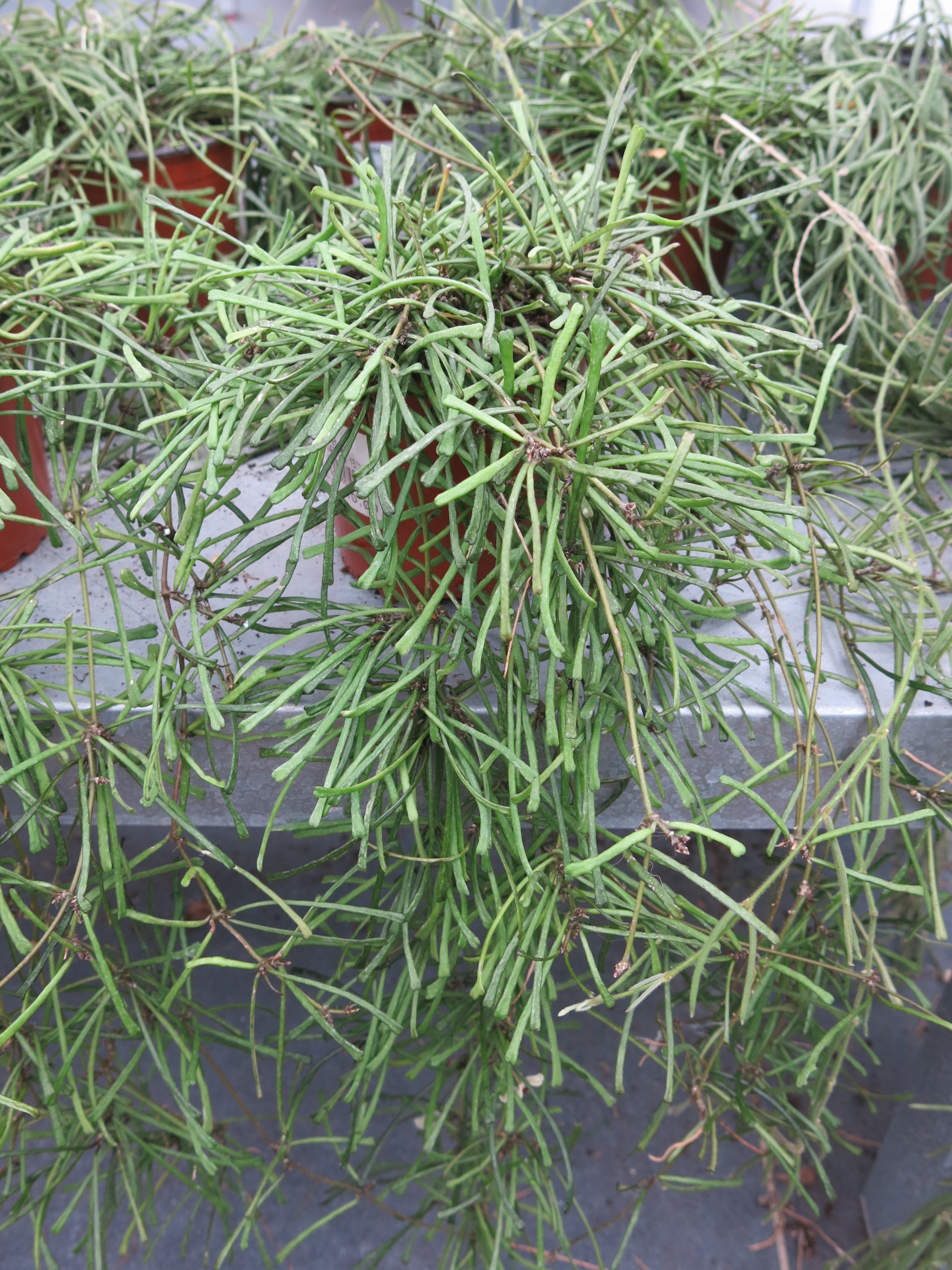
Hoya retusa

- Hoya radicalis Y.Tsiang & P.T.Li – China (Guangxi, Guangdong)
- Hoya ralphdavisiana Kloppenb. – Philippines
- Hoya ramosii Kloppenb. & Siar – Philippines
- Hoya ranauensis T.Green & Kloppenb. – Borneo (Sabah)
- Hoya reticulata Moon – Maluku
- Hoya retrorsa Gavrus – Borneo (Sabah)
- Hoya retusa Dalzell – W. India, E. Himalaya
- Hoya revoluta Wight ex Hook.f. – Borneo, Malaya, Sumatera, Thailand
- Hoya reyesii M.N.Medina & Kloppenb. – Philippines
- Hoya reynosae Kloppenb. – Philippines
- Hoya rhodostele Ridl. – N. Sumatera
- Hoya rhodostemma Schltr. – New Guinea
- Hoya rigida Kerr – Thailand
- Hoya rigidifolia S.Rahayu & Rodda – Sumatera
- Hoya rima Kloppenb. – Philippines
- Hoya rintzii Rodda – W. Malesia
- Hoya rizaliana Kloppenb. – Philippines (Luzon)
- Hoya rosarioae Kloppenb. & Siar – Philippines
- Hoya rosea K.Schum. – New Guinea
- Hoya rostellata Kidyoo – Thailand
- Hoya rotundiflora Rodda & Simonsson – Myanmar
- Hoya rubida Schltr. – Bismarck Arch
- Hoya rumphii Blume – Jawa
- Hoya rundumensis (T.Green) Rodda & Simonsson – Borneo (Sabah, Sarawak)
- Hoya ruthiae Rodda – Borneo (Sabah)

== S ==
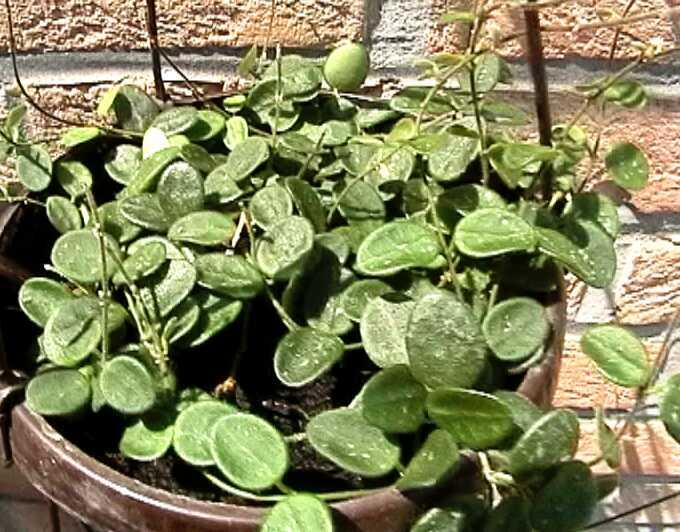
Hoya serpens

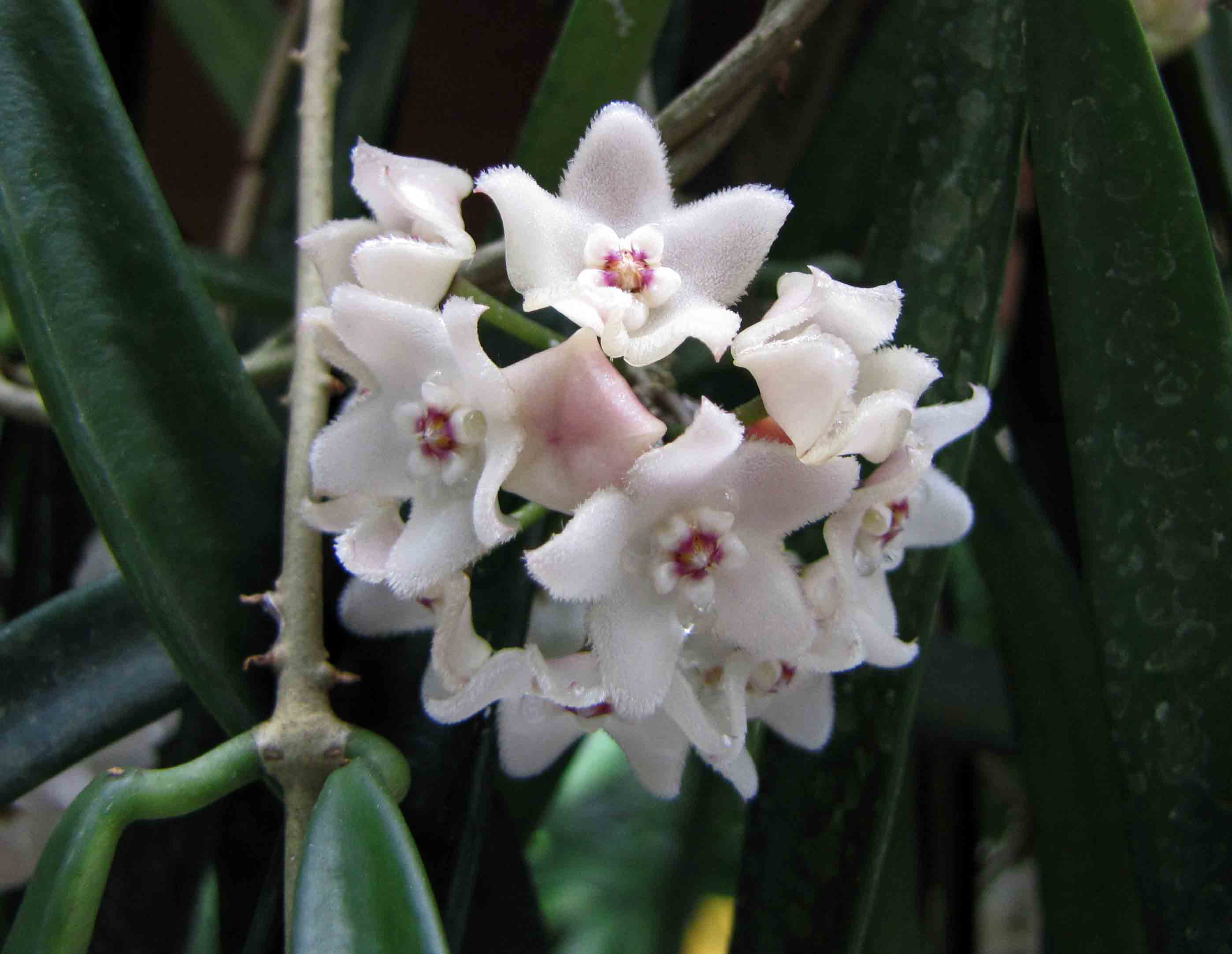
Hoya shepherdii

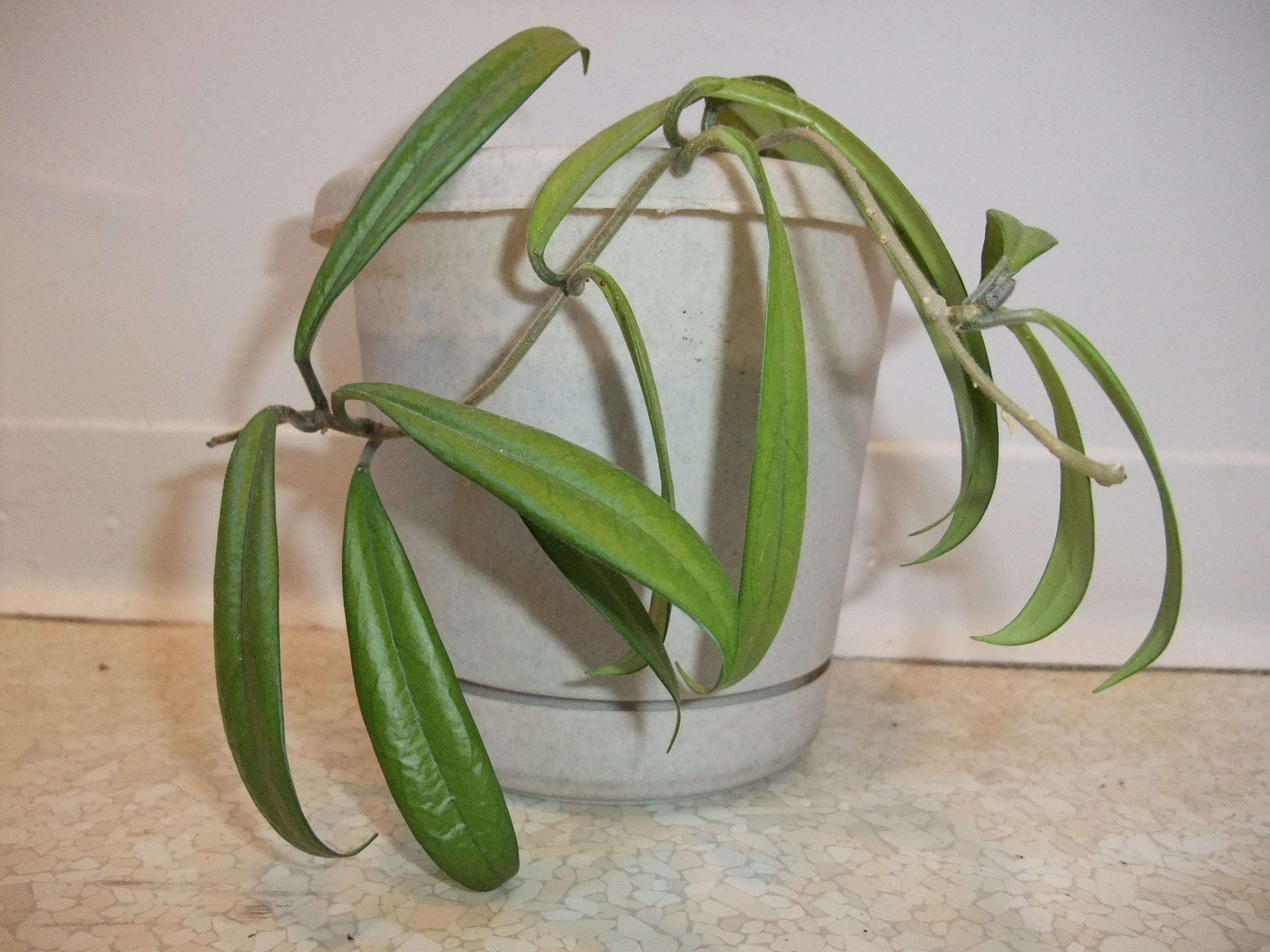
Hoya siamica

- Hoya sabaensis Kloppenb. – Borneo (Sabah)
- Hoya sagcalii Kloppenb. – Philippines
- Hoya salmonea Kloppenb. – Philippines
- Hoya samarensis Kloppenb. & Siar – Philippines
- Hoya sammannaniana A.L.Lamb – Borneo (Sabah, Kalimantan)
- Hoya samoa-albiflora Kloppenb. – Samoa (Upolu)
- Hoya sangguensis S.Rahayu & Rodda – Borneo
- Hoya santafeensis Kloppenb. & G.Mend. – Philippines
- Hoya santiagoi Kloppenb. & Siar – Philippines
- Hoya sapaensis T.B.Tran & Rodda – Vietnam
- Hoya sarawakensis Kloppenb. – Borneo (Sarawak)
- Hoya sarcophylla Ridl. – Sumatera
- Hoya savaiiensis Kloppenb. – Samoa
- Hoya schallertiae C.M.Burton – Philippines
- Hoya schneei Schltr. – Caroline Islands. (Pohnpei)
- Hoya scortechinii King & Gamble – Thailand to W. Malesia
- Hoya seanwhistleriana Kloppenb. – Samoa
- Hoya serpens Hook.f. – C. & E. Himalaya, Andaman Islands
- Hoya shepherdii Short ex Hook. – E. Himalaya to Assam
- Hoya siamica Craib – China (NW. Yunnan) to Indo-China
- Hoya sichuanensis E.F.Huang – China South-Central
- Hoya sigillatis T.Green – Borneo (Sabah)
- Hoya silvatica Y.Tsiang & P.T.Li – S. Tibet to China (NW. Yunnan)
- Hoya sipitangensis Kloppenb. & Wiberg – N. & NW. Borneo
- Hoya smithii Kloppenb. – Fiji
- Hoya soidaoensis Kidyoo – Thailand
- Hoya solaniflora Schltr. – New Guinea
- Hoya soligamiana Kloppenb. – Philippines
- Hoya solokensis S.Rahayu & Rodda – Sumatera
- Hoya somadeeae Rodda & Simonsson – Thailand
- Hoya sororia K.Schum. – Bismarck Arch
- Hoya spartioides (Benth.) Kloppenb. – Borneo
- Hoya spectatissima B.Xue, E.F.Huang, Gang Yao & Jiu X.Huang – China South-Central
- Hoya spencii Kloppenb. – Samoa
- Hoya stafeensis Kloppenb. & G.Mend. – Philippines
- Hoya stenakei Simonsson & Rodda – Papua New Guinea
- Hoya stenophylla Schltr. – New Guinea
- Hoya stoneana Kloppenb. & Siar – Philippines
- Hoya subcalva Burkill – New Guinea
- Hoya subglabra Schltr. – New Guinea
- Hoya subquaterna Miq. – Jawa
- Hoya subquintuplinervis Miq. – N. Thailand
- Hoya sulawesiana S.Rahayu & Rodda – Sulawesi
- Hoya sulitii Kloppenb. – Philippines
- Hoya sumatrana S.Rahayu & Rodda – Sumatera
- Hoya sungwookii Aver., Vuong, Nhan & V.C.Nguyen
- Hoya surigaoensis Kloppenb. – Philippines
- Hoya surisana Rodda & S.Rahayu – Sulawesi
- Hoya sussuela (Roxb.) Merr. – Malesia to N. Queensland

== T ==
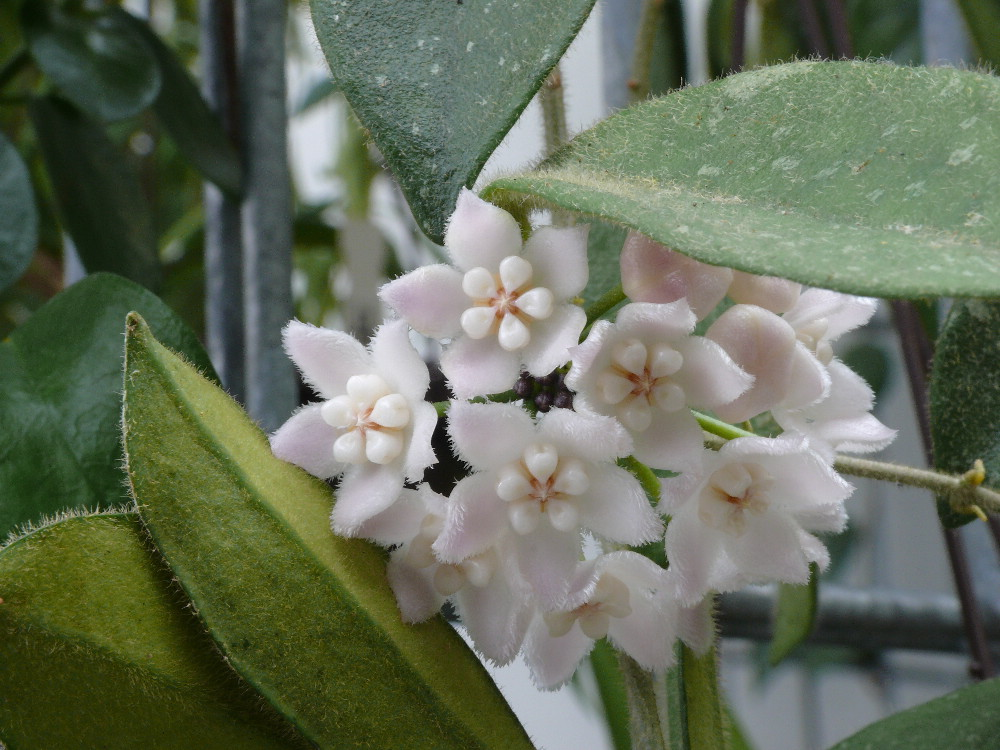
Hoya thomsonii

- Hoya tamaleaaea Kloppenb. – Samoa
- Hoya tamdaoensis Rodda & T.B.Tran – China (Guangxi) to Vietnam
- Hoya tangerina Kloppenb. – Philippines
- Hoya tannaensis T.Green & Kloppenb. – Vanuatu
- Hoya tarikuensis Rodda & Simonsson – New Guinea
- Hoya tauensis Kloppenb. – American Samoa
- Hoya taylorii Kloppenb. – Philippines (Luzon)
- Hoya taytayensis Kloppenb. & Siar – Philippines
- Hoya taywanisensis Kloppenb. – Philippines (Luzon)
- Hoya telosmoides Omlor – Borneo (Sabah, N. Sarawak)
- Hoya tengchongensis J.F.Zhang – China (Yunnan)
- Hoya teretifolia Griff. ex Hook.f. – Arunachal Pradesh to Assam
- Hoya tetrantha J.Feng Zhang, Y.H.Tong & N.H.Xia – China South-Central
- Hoya thailandica Thaithong – N. Thailand
- Hoya thomsonii Hook.f. – Tibet to Assam
- Hoya thuathienhuensis T.B.Tran – Vietnam
- Hoya tiatuilaensis Kloppenb. – American Samoa
- Hoya tjampeaensis Hochr. – Jawa
- Hoya tomataensis T.Green & Kloppenb. – Sulawesi
- Hoya torricellensis Schltr. – New Guinea
- Hoya towutiensis S.Rahayu, R.P.P.Ahmad & Rodda – Sulawesi
- Hoya trigonolobos Schltr. – Bismarck Arch
- Hoya trukensis Hosok. – Caroline Islands
- Hoya tsangii C.M.Burton – Philippines (S. Luzon)
- Hoya × tuafanua Whistler & Kloppenb. – Samoa

== U–V ==
- Hoya uafatoensis Kloppenb. – Samoa (Upolu)
- Hoya uncinata Teijsm. & Binn. – Sumatera to W. Jawa
- Hoya undulata S.Rahayu & Rodda – Borneo (Kalimantan)
- Hoya unica Kloppenb. – Philippines
- Hoya uniflora Aver. & V.T.Pham – Laos
- Hoya unirana Rodda & Simonsson – New Guinea
- Hoya unruhiana Kloppenb. – Philippines
- Hoya uplandgrantensis Kloppenb. – Philippines
- Hoya vacciniiflora O.Schwartz – Borneo
- Hoya vaccinioides Hook.f. – Arunachal Pradesh to Indo-China
- Hoya vangviengiensis Rodda & Simonsson – China (S. Yunnan) to Laos
- Hoya vanuatensis T.Green – Vanuatu
- Hoya velasioi Kloppenb. – Philippines
- Hoya venusta Schltr. – New Guinea
- Hoya versteegii Simonsson & Rodda – W. New Guinea
- Hoya verticillata (Vahl) G.Don – Trop. & Subtrop. Asia to Samoa, Queensland
- Hoya vicencioana Kloppenb. – Philippines
- Hoya vitellina Blume – W. Jawa, Borneo (Sarawak)
- Hoya vitellinoides Bakh.f. – Sumatera to Jawa
- Hoya vitiensis Turrill – Fiji

== W–Z ==
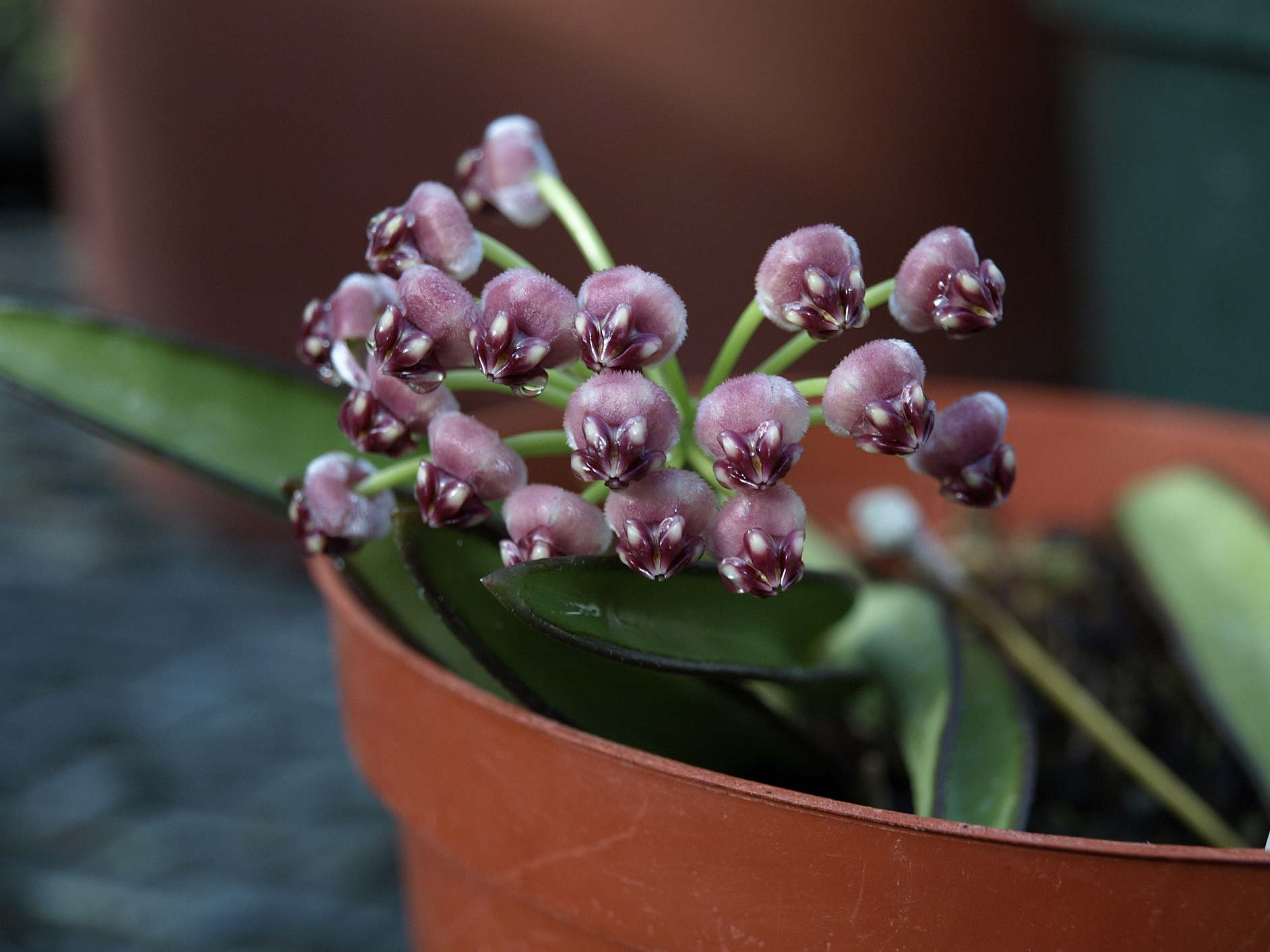
Hoya wayetii

- Hoya wallichii (Wight) C.M.Burton – S. Malaya, Borneo (Brunei)
- Hoya walliniana Kloppenb. & Nyhuus – Borneo (Sabah, Sarawak)
- Hoya wariana Schltr. – New Guinea
- Hoya wayetii Kloppenb. – Philippines (N. Luzon)
- Hoya waymaniae Kloppenb. – Borneo
- Hoya weebella Kloppenb. – Thailand
- Hoya whistleri Kloppenb. – Samoa
- Hoya wightii Hook.f. – W. & S. India
- Hoya williamsiana Kloppenb. – Philippines
- Hoya wongii Rodda – Borneo (Brunei)
- Hoya wrayi King & Gamble – Thailand to W. Malesia
- Hoya yingjiangensis J.Feng Zhang – China (Yunnan)
- Hoya yuennanensis Hand.-Mazz. – China (NW. Yunnan)
- Hoya yvesrocheri Simonsson & Rodda – Papua New Guinea
