= Hoya acuminata =

Scientific classification
- Kingdom: Plantae
- Clade: Tracheophytes
- Clade: Angiosperms
- Clade: Eudicots
- Clade: Asterids
- Order: Gentianales
- Family: Apocynaceae
- Genus: Hoya
- Species: H. acuminata

Binomial name
- Hoya acuminata (Wight) Benth. ex Hook.f.

Species of plant

Hoya acuminata is a species of flowering plant in the dogbane family Apocynaceae, native to a stretch of Asia from the eastern Himalaya to Indochina.

== Description ==
Hoya acuminata is an epiphytic shrub with erect stems and pendulous branches. The leaves are opposite, elliptic to lanceolate, 4 to 10 cm long and 2 to 3.5 cm wide, glossy and fleshy, and taper to a long point, the feature that gives the species its name. Terminal umbels of two to three flowers open white with pink centers between May and July.

== Distribution and habitat ==
The species ranges from the eastern Himalaya through Myanmar to Indochina. In India it has long been known from the Khasi Hills of Meghalaya, and was recorded for the first time in Nagaland in 2023, in the Kohima district at about 1,721 m elevation.

== Taxonomy ==
The species was originally described as Pterostelma acuminatum by Robert Wight in 1834. George Bentham transferred it to Hoya in a treatment credited to him and published under Joseph Dalton Hooker's name in the Flora of British India in 1883.

The specific epithet acuminata is Latin for "tapering to a point," describing the long-pointed tip of the leaves.

== See also ==
- List of Hoya species
