= Hoya acicularis =

Scientific classification
- Kingdom: Plantae
- Clade: Tracheophytes
- Clade: Angiosperms
- Clade: Eudicots
- Clade: Asterids
- Order: Gentianales
- Family: Apocynaceae
- Genus: Hoya
- Species: H. acicularis

Binomial name
- Hoya acicularis T.Green & Kloppenb.

Species of plant

Hoya acicularis is a species of flowering plant in the dogbane family Apocynaceae, native to Borneo. It is a climbing epiphyte or lithophyte.

== Description ==
In cultivation, Hoya acicularis is grown for its slender, needle-like leaves, up to about 10 cm long, the feature that gives the species its name.

== Distribution and habitat ==
The species is native to Sabah, in Malaysian Borneo, and to Brunei.

== Taxonomy ==
The species was described by Ted Green and Robert Dale Kloppenburg in 2002 in Fraterna, the newsletter of the International Hoya Association. The holotype (Green 93031) was collected in the Danum Valley, Sabah, and vouchered from material cultivated at Green's nursery in Ka'a'awa, Hawaii; it is held at the Bernice P. Bishop Museum (BISH).

The specific epithet acicularis comes from the Latin acicula ("little needle"), a reference to the plant's narrow, needle-shaped leaves.

== See also ==
- List of Hoya species
