= Hoya callistophylla =

Scientific classification
- Kingdom: Plantae
- Clade: Tracheophytes
- Clade: Angiosperms
- Clade: Eudicots
- Clade: Asterids
- Order: Gentianales
- Family: Apocynaceae
- Genus: Hoya
- Species: H. callistophylla

Binomial name
- Hoya callistophylla T.Green

Species of plant

Hoya callistophylla is a species of flowering plant in the dogbane family Apocynaceae, native to the island of Borneo.

== Description ==
Hoya callistophylla is a robust climbing vine grown as an epiphyte. Its leaves are thick and elongated, marked with a dense network of dark veins against a paler blade, the feature that gives the species its name. The original description characterizes the flowers as roughly 1.3 cm (½ in) across, yellow and red, borne in umbels of 20 to 25.

== Distribution and habitat ==
Hoya callistophylla is native to the island of Borneo.

== Taxonomy ==
The species was described by American hoya specialist Ted Green in 2000 in Fraterna, the newsletter of the International Hoya Association, from a plant in cultivation, collection number Green 201. The type locality was originally recorded as Bau, Sarawak, but this was corrected in a 2007 notice to Nabawan, in the Malaysian state of Sabah. The holotype is held at the Bernice P. Bishop Museum (BISH) in Honolulu.

The specific epithet callistophylla combines the Greek kallistos ("most beautiful") and phyllon ("leaf"), a reference to the plant's strikingly patterned foliage.

== See also ==
- List of Hoya species
