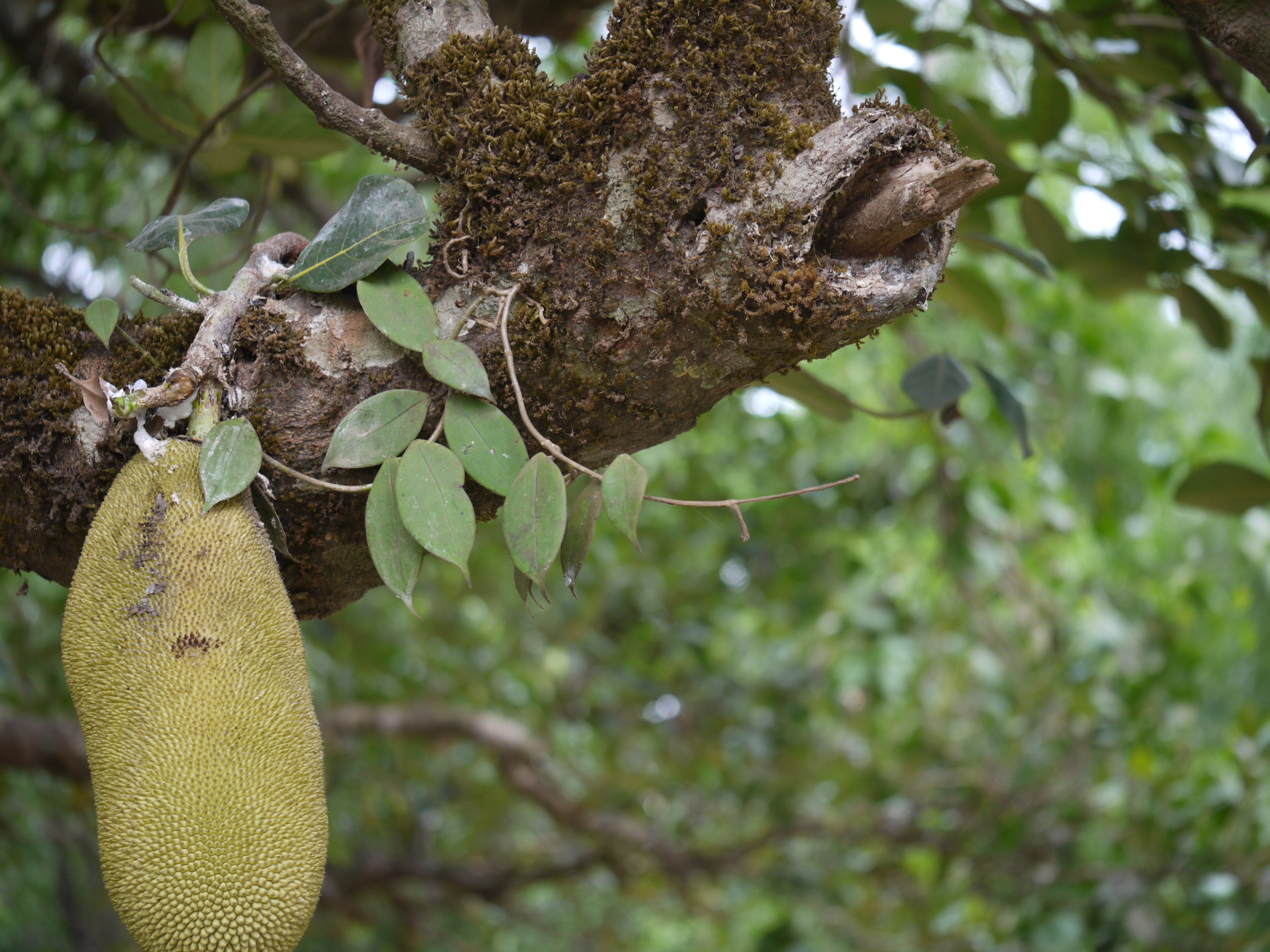

Scientific classification
- Kingdom: Plantae
- Clade: Tracheophytes
- Clade: Angiosperms
- Clade: Eudicots
- Clade: Asterids
- Order: Gentianales
- Family: Apocynaceae
- Genus: Hoya
- Species: H. alexicaca

Binomial name
- Hoya alexicaca (Jacq.) Moon

= Hoya alexicaca =

Species of plant

Hoya alexicaca is a species of Hoya native to India and Myanmar.

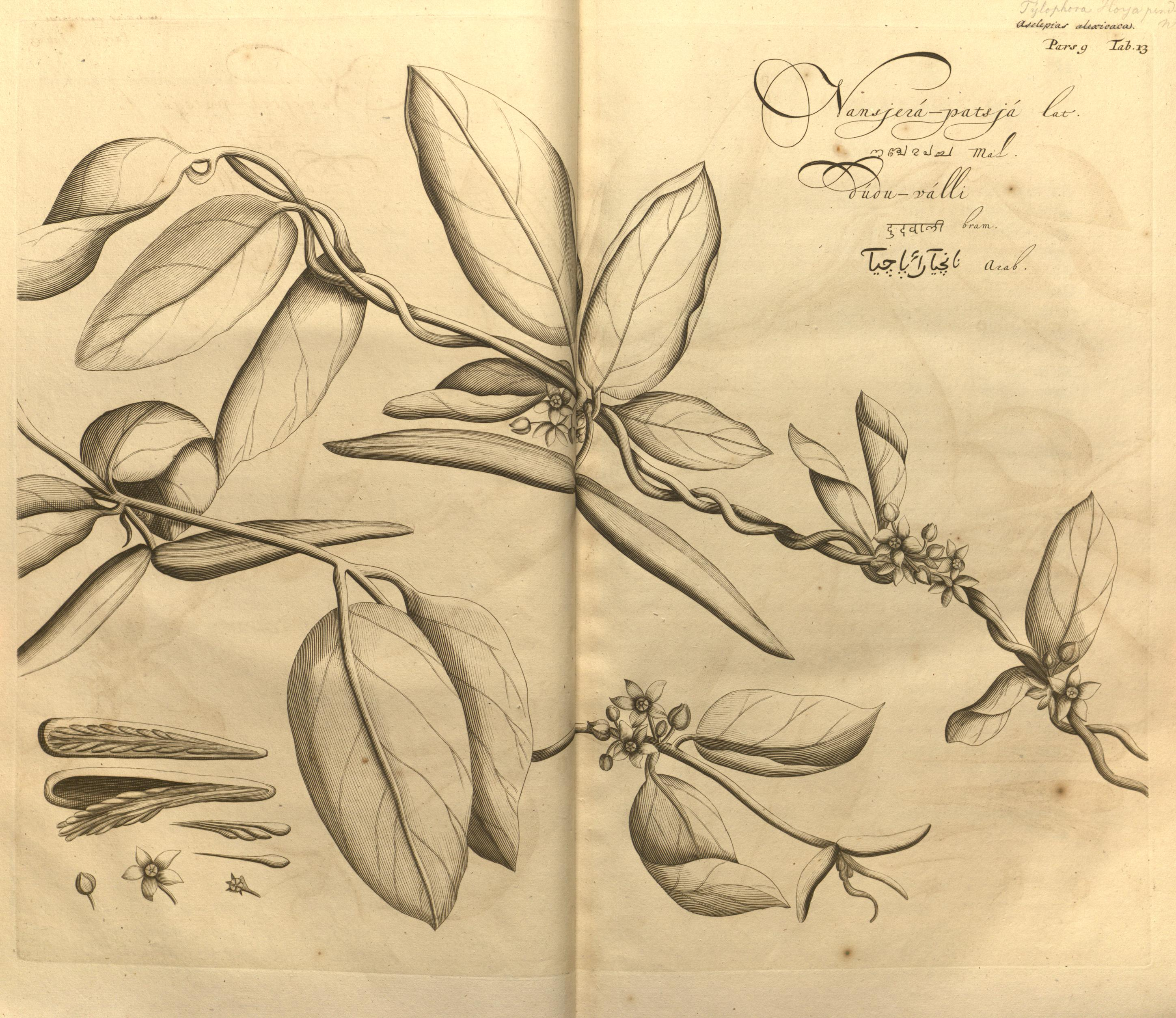

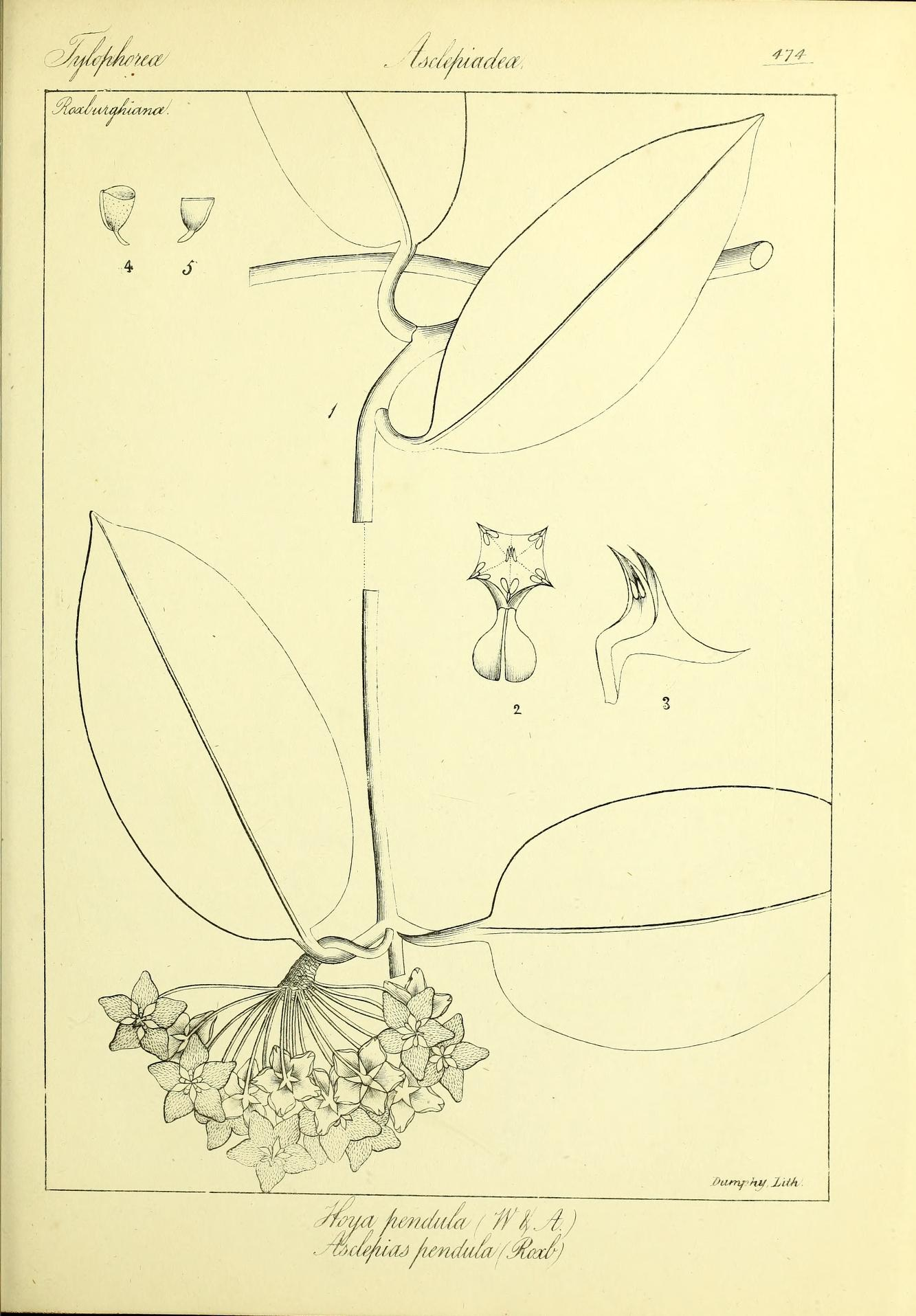

== See also ==
- List of Hoya species
