= Hoya rotundiflora =

Scientific classification
- Kingdom: Plantae
- Clade: Tracheophytes
- Clade: Angiosperms
- Clade: Eudicots
- Clade: Asterids
- Order: Gentianales
- Family: Apocynaceae
- Genus: Hoya
- Species: H. rotundiflora

Binomial name
- Hoya rotundiflora Rodda & Simonsson

Species of plant

Hoya rotundiflora is a species of Hoya native to Myanmar.

== See also ==
- List of Hoya species
