= Hoya erythrina =

Scientific classification
- Kingdom: Plantae
- Clade: Tracheophytes
- Clade: Angiosperms
- Clade: Eudicots
- Clade: Asterids
- Order: Gentianales
- Family: Apocynaceae
- Genus: Hoya
- Species: H. erythrina

Binomial name
- Hoya erythrina Rintz

Species of plant

Hoya erythrina is a species of waxflower native to Vietnam and Malaysia.

== See also ==
- List of Hoya species
