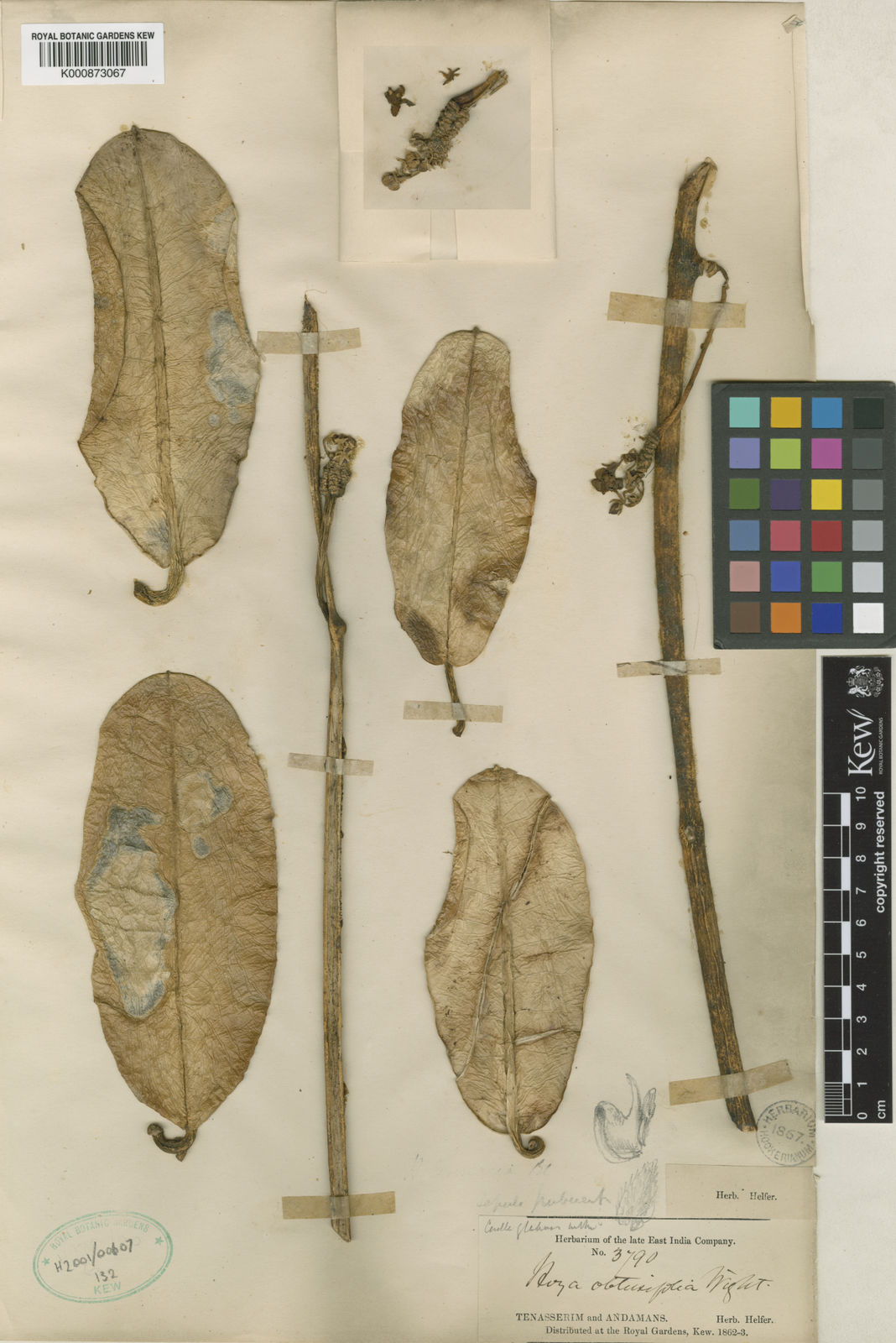

Scientific classification
- Kingdom: Plantae
- Clade: Tracheophytes
- Clade: Angiosperms
- Clade: Eudicots
- Clade: Asterids
- Order: Gentianales
- Family: Apocynaceae
- Genus: Hoya
- Species: H. obtusifolia

Binomial name
- Hoya obtusifolia Wight

Synonyms
- Hoya teysmanniana Miq.; Hoya teysmanniana variegata Jacob-Makoy

= Hoya obtusifolia =

Species of plant

Hoya obtusifolia is a species of Hoya native to S. Myanmar to W. Malesia.

== See also ==
- List of Hoya species
