= Hoya endauensis =

Scientific classification
- Kingdom: Plantae
- Clade: Tracheophytes
- Clade: Angiosperms
- Clade: Eudicots
- Clade: Asterids
- Order: Gentianales
- Family: Apocynaceae
- Genus: Hoya
- Species: H. endauensis

Binomial name
- Hoya endauensis Kiew
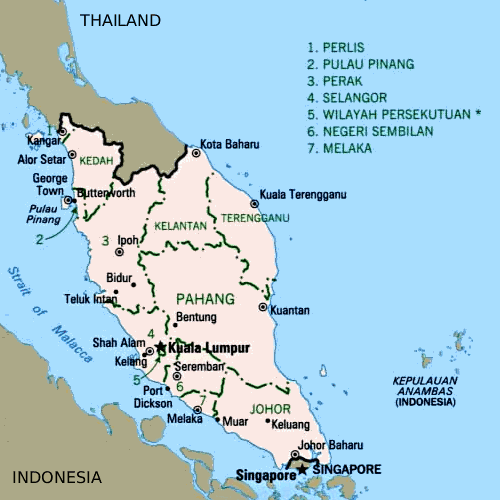

Species of plant

Hoya endauensis is a species of Hoya native to peninsular Malaysia. It is a climbing epiphyte or lithophyte and is found in the wet tropical biome.

== See also ==
- List of Hoya species
