= Hoya acanthominima =

Scientific classification
- Kingdom: Plantae
- Clade: Tracheophytes
- Clade: Angiosperms
- Clade: Eudicots
- Clade: Asterids
- Order: Gentianales
- Family: Apocynaceae
- Genus: Hoya
- Species: H. acanthominima

Binomial name
- Hoya acanthominima Kloppenb., G.Mend. & Ferreras

Species of plant

Hoya acanthominima is a species of flowering plant in the dogbane family Apocynaceae, native to the Philippines. First described in 2013, its conservation status is predicted as threatened by Plants of the World Online.

== Taxonomy ==
The species was described in 2013 by Robert Dale Kloppenburg, George Mendoza, and Ulysses Ferreras in Hoya New, a periodical devoted to the genus. The type specimen (Mendoza 50, holotype PUH 14648) was collected on the island of Luzon.

The specific epithet acanthominima combines the Greek akantha ("thorn" or "spine") and the Latin minima ("smallest"), likely a reference to small spine-like structures on the plant, though the sources consulted do not specify the exact feature.

== See also ==
- List of Hoya species
