= Hoya carrii =

Scientific classification
- Kingdom: Plantae
- Clade: Tracheophytes
- Clade: Angiosperms
- Clade: Eudicots
- Clade: Asterids
- Order: Gentianales
- Family: Apocynaceae
- Genus: Hoya
- Species: H. carrii

Binomial name
- Hoya carrii P.I.Forst. & Liddle ex Simonsson & Rodda

Species of plant

Hoya carrii is a species of Hoya native to Papua New Guinea.

== See also ==
- List of Hoya species
