= Hoya naumannii =

Scientific classification
- Kingdom: Plantae
- Clade: Tracheophytes
- Clade: Angiosperms
- Clade: Eudicots
- Clade: Asterids
- Order: Gentianales
- Family: Apocynaceae
- Genus: Hoya
- Species: H. naumannii

Binomial name
- Hoya naumannii Schltr.

Species of plant

Hoya naumannii is a species of flowering plant in the family Apocynaceae. It is native to the wet tropics of the Solomon Islands. Named for collector Friedrich Naumann, it is occasionally kept as a houseplant, but needs to get quite sizable before it will flower.
