= Hoya diversifolia =

Scientific classification
- Kingdom: Plantae
- Clade: Tracheophytes
- Clade: Angiosperms
- Clade: Eudicots
- Clade: Asterids
- Order: Gentianales
- Family: Apocynaceae
- Genus: Hoya
- Species: H. diversifolia

Binomial name
- Hoya diversifolia Blume

Synonyms
- List: Eriostemma zollingerianum (Miq.) Kloppenb.; Hoya alba Kostel.; Hoya bulusanensis Elmer; Hoya coriacea Zoll. ex Miq.; Hoya crassipes Turcz.; Hoya diversifolia subsp. elnidicus (Kloppenb.) Kloppenb.; Hoya elnidicus Kloppenb.; Hoya esculenta Tsiang; Hoya liangii Tsiang; Hoya orbiculata Wall. ex Wight; Hoya panchoi Kloppenb.; Hoya persicinicoronaria Shao Y.He & P.T.Li; Hoya zollingeriana Miq.

Species of plant

Hoya diversifolia is a widespread species of flowering plant in the family Apocynaceae. It is native to Hainan, all of mainland Southeast Asia and the Andaman Islands, and Malesia. An epiphyte, it is typically found climbing on and even covering trees in shoreline mangrove forests, and further inland.

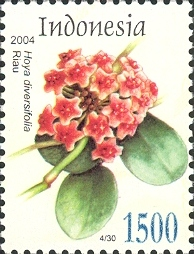
On an Indonesian postage stamp
