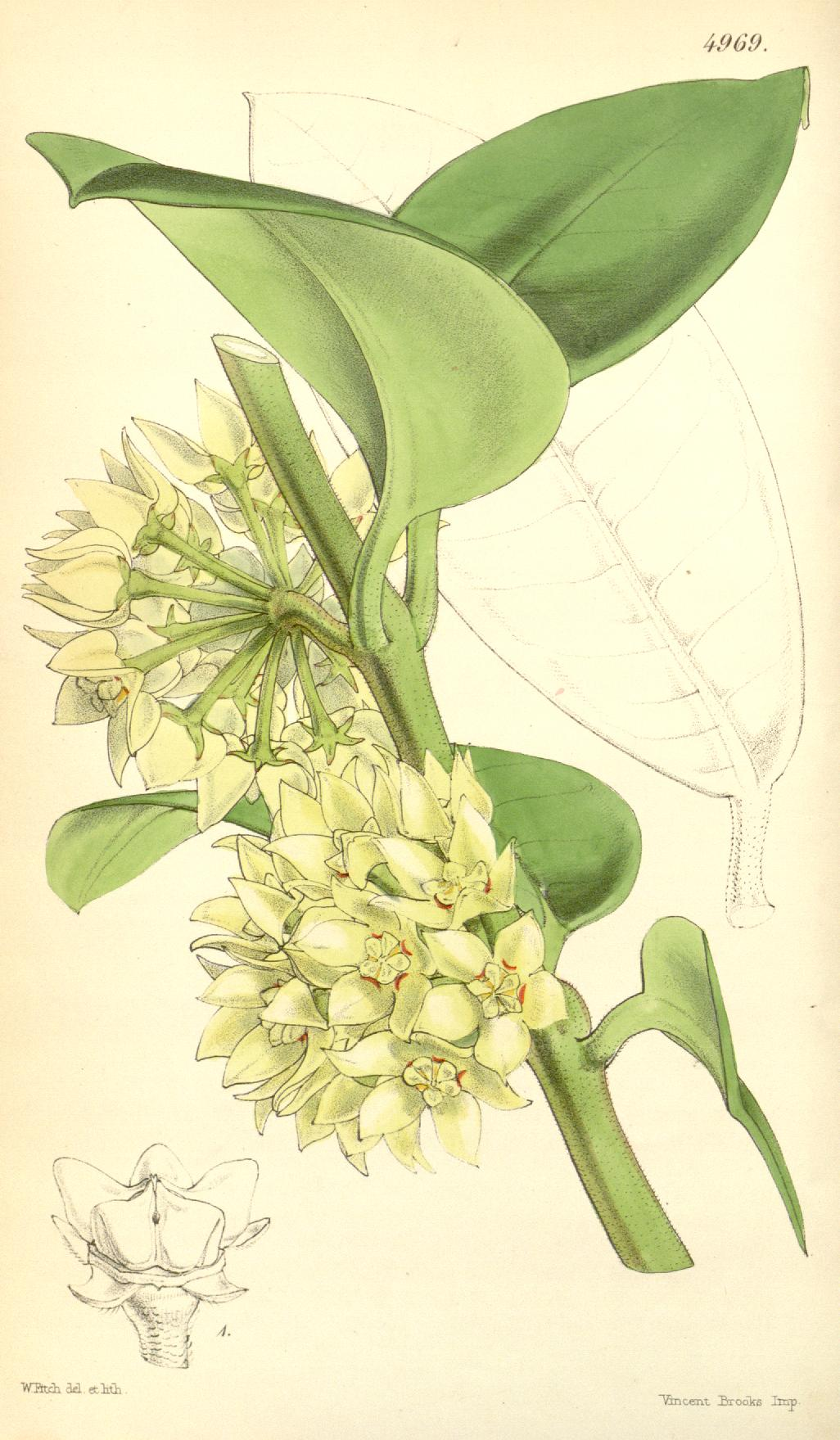
- Hoya coronaria Blume, Asclepiadoideae, Apocynaceae

Scientific classification
- Kingdom: Plantae
- Clade: Tracheophytes
- Clade: Angiosperms
- Clade: Eudicots
- Clade: Asterids
- Order: Gentianales
- Family: Apocynaceae
- Genus: Hoya
- Species: H. coronaria

Binomial name
- Hoya coronaria Blume,

= Hoya coronaria =

Species of plant

Hoya coronaria is an epiphyte of the family Apocynaceae. It is native to Southeast Asia.
