= Hoya deykeae =

Scientific classification
- Kingdom: Plantae
- Clade: Tracheophytes
- Clade: Angiosperms
- Clade: Eudicots
- Clade: Asterids
- Order: Gentianales
- Family: Apocynaceae
- Genus: Hoya
- Species: H. deykeae

Binomial name
- Hoya deykeae T.Green

Species of plant

Hoya deykeae (originally published as Hoya deykei), is a species of flowering plant in the family Apocynaceae. It is native to Sumatra. A shrub, it is valued as a houseplant for its slow growth and heart-shaped leaves.
