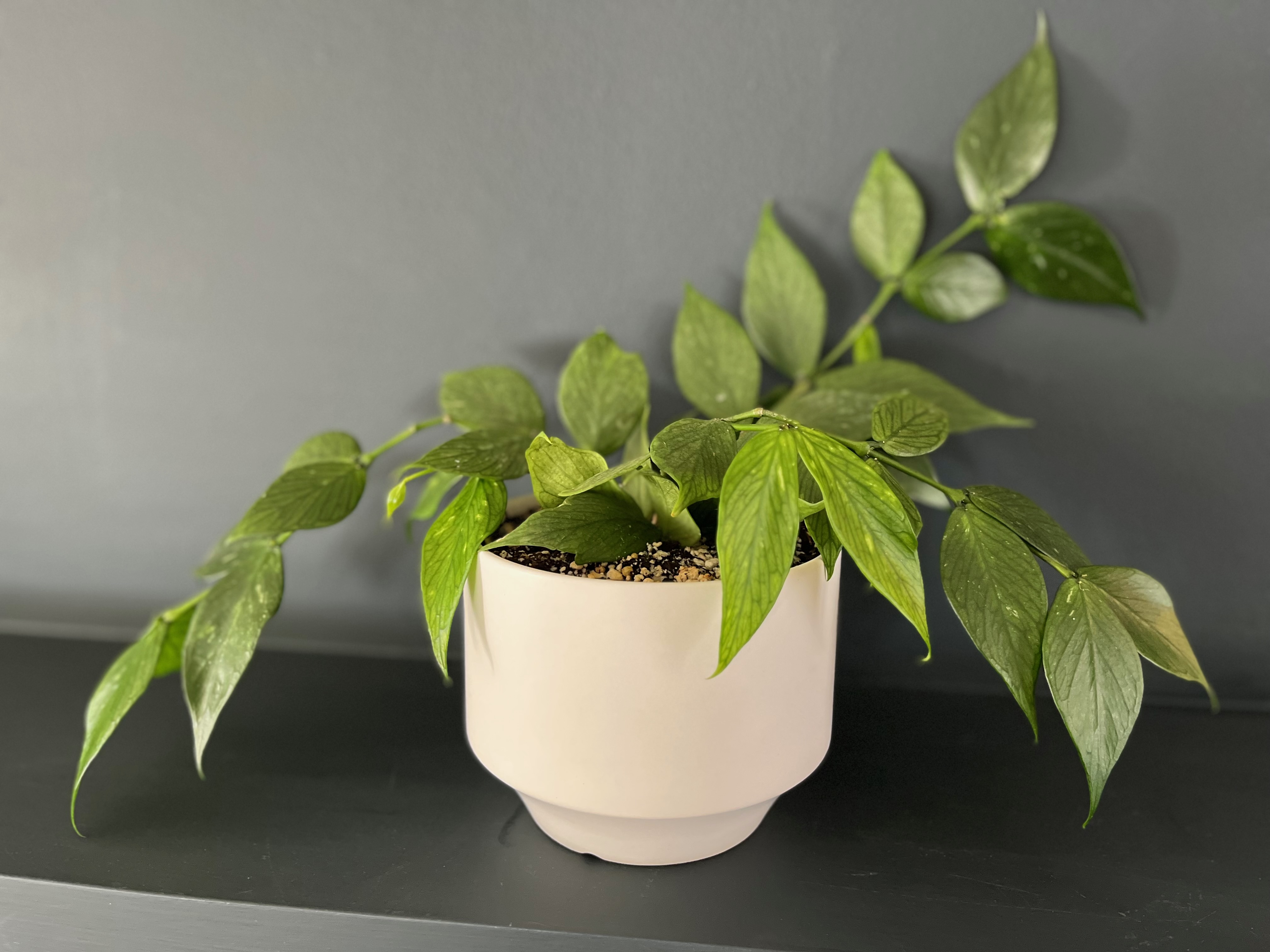
- Hoya polyneura grown as a houseplant

Scientific classification
- Kingdom: Plantae
- Clade: Tracheophytes
- Clade: Angiosperms
- Clade: Eudicots
- Clade: Asterids
- Order: Gentianales
- Family: Apocynaceae
- Genus: Hoya
- Species: H. polyneura

Binomial name
- Hoya polyneura Hook.f.

= Hoya polyneura =

Species of plant

Hoya polyneura, commonly known as the fishtail hoya, is a species of flowering plant in the genus Hoya found from the Himalayas to northwest Yunnan.

== Description ==
This species has a pendant, epiphytic growth habit, and its common name derives from the mermaid's tail shape and fine venation of the leaves.
