= Hoya querinoensis =

Scientific classification
- Kingdom: Plantae
- Clade: Tracheophytes
- Clade: Angiosperms
- Clade: Eudicots
- Clade: Asterids
- Order: Gentianales
- Family: Apocynaceae
- Genus: Hoya
- Species: H. querinoensis

Binomial name
- Hoya querinoensis Kloppenb. & Siar

Species of tropical plant

Hoya querinoensis is a species of tropical plant in the oleander and frangipani family Apocynaceae. It is native to the Philippines and is found in a wet tropical biome. Hoya querinoensis was described by botanists Dale Kloppenburg and Monina V. Siar in 2007 in the journal Fraterna.

== Description ==
Hoya querinoensis is highly similar to Hoya fischeriana, but varies in a few key ways. The corolla is wider in diameter at 1.2 centimetres (0.47 in); the pedicels are longer at 3.7 centimetres (1.5 in); the sepals are a more narrow lance-like shape.
