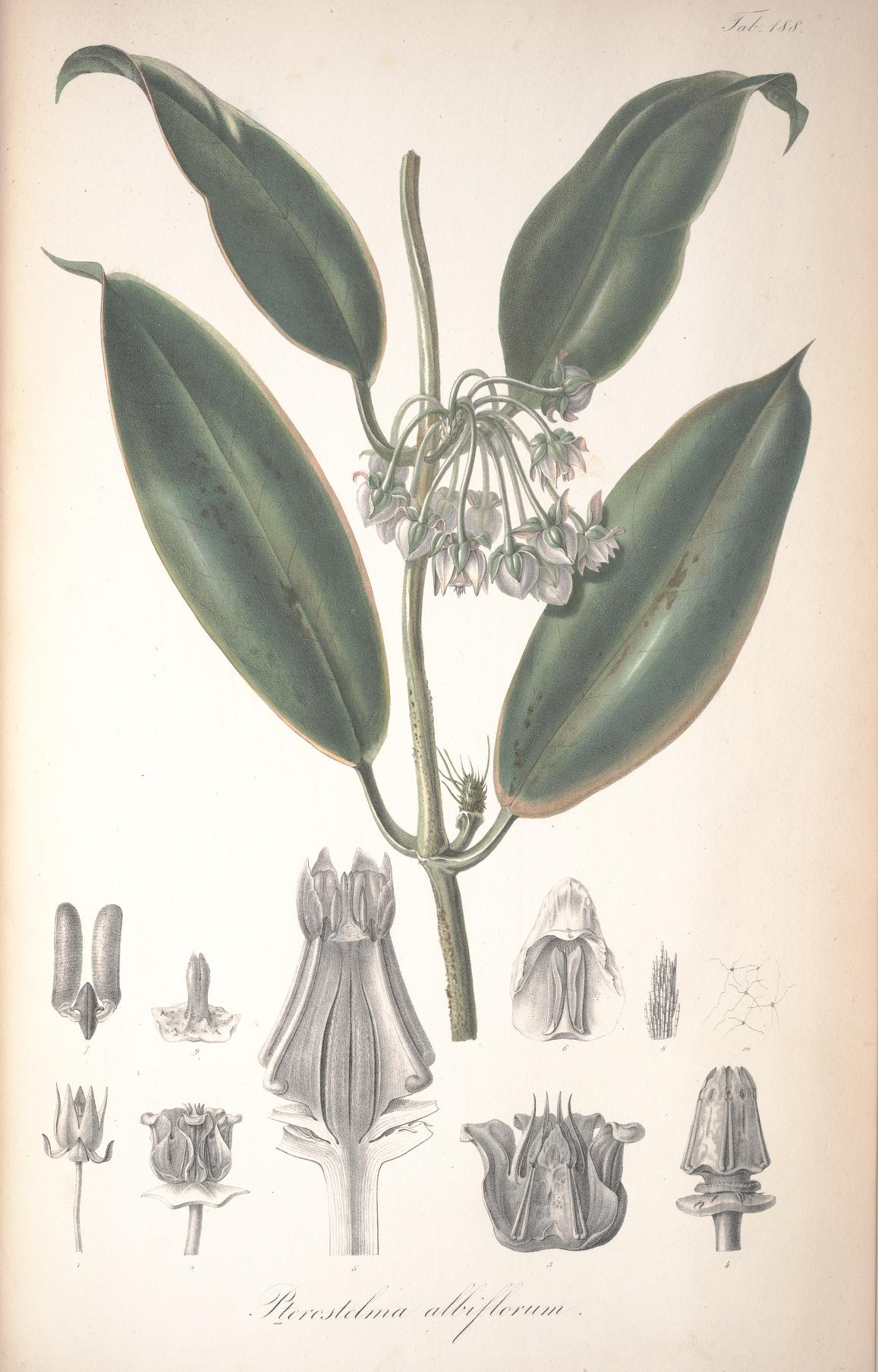
- Illustration

Scientific classification
- Kingdom: Plantae
- Clade: Tracheophytes
- Clade: Angiosperms
- Clade: Eudicots
- Clade: Asterids
- Order: Gentianales
- Family: Apocynaceae
- Genus: Hoya
- Species: H. albiflora

Binomial name
- Hoya albiflora (Blume) Zipp. ex K.Schum.

Synonyms
- Pterostelma albiflora Blume.

= Hoya albiflora =

Species of plant

Hoya albiflora is a species of Hoya native to Papua New Guinea.

== See also ==
- List of Hoya species
