= Hoya gracilis =

Scientific classification
- Kingdom: Plantae
- Clade: Tracheophytes
- Clade: Angiosperms
- Clade: Eudicots
- Clade: Asterids
- Order: Gentianales
- Family: Apocynaceae
- Genus: Hoya
- Species: H. gracilis

Binomial name
- Hoya gracilis Schltr.

Species of plant

Hoya gracilis is a species of flowering plant in the family Apocynaceae. An evergreen epiphyte, it is native to the wet tropics of Sulawesi. It has gained the Royal Horticultural Society's Award of Garden Merit as a houseplant, and is widely available from commercial suppliers.
