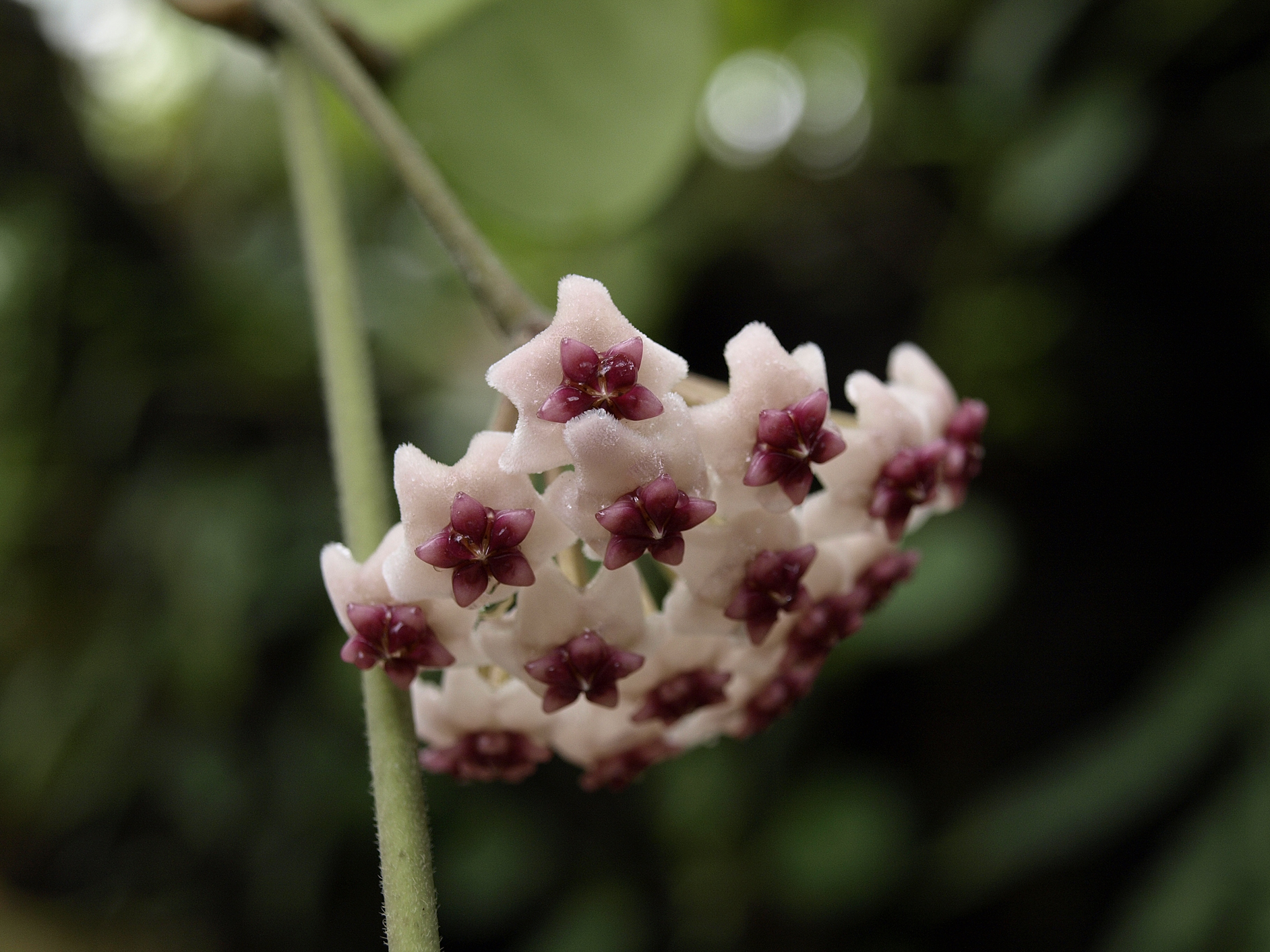
- Flower
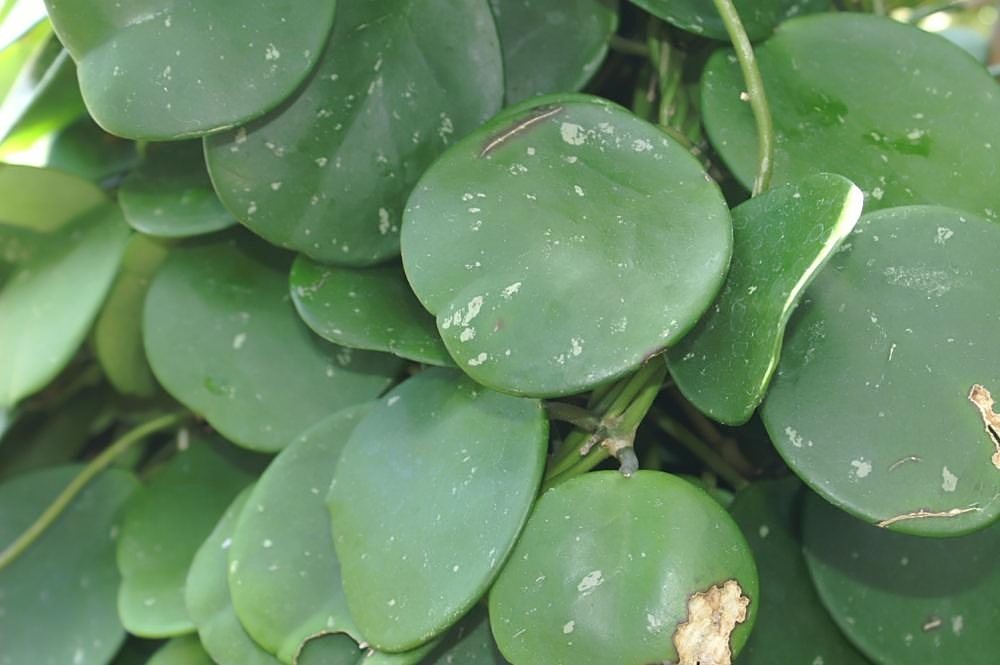
- Leaves

Scientific classification
- Kingdom: Plantae
- Clade: Embryophytes
- Clade: Tracheophytes
- Clade: Spermatophytes
- Clade: Angiosperms
- Clade: Eudicots
- Clade: Asterids
- Order: Gentianales
- Family: Apocynaceae
- Genus: Hoya
- Species: H. obovata

Binomial name
- Hoya obovata Decne.

= Hoya obovata =

Species of plant

Hoya obovata is a species of Hoya. It is an epiphyte native to Indo-China, Sulawesi, and Maluku.

== See also ==
- List of Hoya species
