= Hoya salmonea =

Scientific classification
- Kingdom: Plantae
- Clade: Embryophytes
- Clade: Tracheophytes
- Clade: Spermatophytes
- Clade: Angiosperms
- Clade: Eudicots
- Clade: Asterids
- Order: Gentianales
- Family: Apocynaceae
- Genus: Hoya
- Species: H. salmonea

Binomial name
- Hoya salmonea Kloppenb., Guevarra, G.Mend. & Ferreras

Species of plant

Hoya salmonea is a species of Hoya native to the Philippines.

== See also ==
- List of Hoya species
