= Hoya pandurata =

Conservation status
- Vulnerable (IUCN 3.1)

Scientific classification
- Kingdom: Plantae
- Clade: Tracheophytes
- Clade: Angiosperms
- Clade: Eudicots
- Clade: Asterids
- Order: Gentianales
- Family: Apocynaceae
- Genus: Hoya
- Species: H. pandurata

Binomial name
- Hoya pandurata Tsiang

Species of plant

Hoya pandurata is a species of plant in the family Apocynaceae. It is endemic to China. It is a subshrub that grows as an epiphyte.
