= Hoya aurigueana =

Scientific classification
- Kingdom: Plantae
- Clade: Tracheophytes
- Clade: Angiosperms
- Clade: Eudicots
- Clade: Asterids
- Order: Gentianales
- Family: Apocynaceae
- Genus: Hoya
- Species: H. aurigueana

Binomial name
- Hoya aurigueana Kloppenburg, Siar & Cajano 2012

Species of plant

Hoya aurigueana is an endemic species of porcelainflower or wax plant found in the Quezon province, Luzon, Philippines is an Asclepiad species of flowering plant in the dogbane family Apocynaceae described in 2012 by Kloppenburg, Siar & Cajano. There are no subspecies listed.

== Etymology ==
The specific epithet, aurigueana refers to the name of the Senior Science Research Specialist at the Philippine Nuclear Research Institute, Mr. Fernando B. Aurigue who collected the plant.
