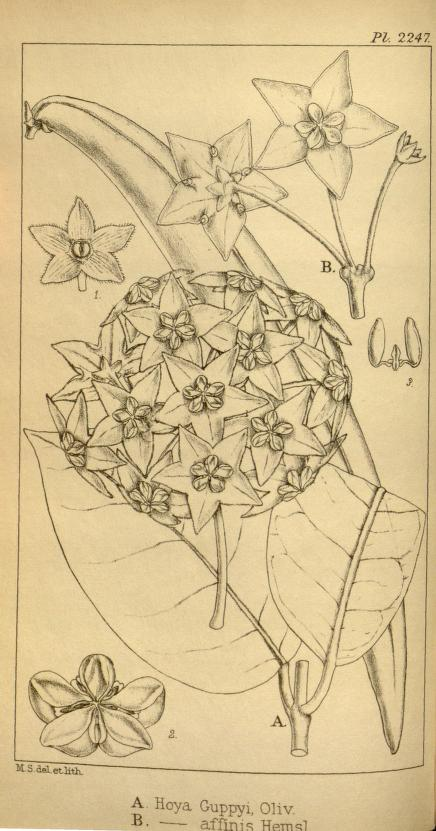
- Illustration

Scientific classification
- Kingdom: Plantae
- Clade: Tracheophytes
- Clade: Angiosperms
- Clade: Eudicots
- Clade: Asterids
- Order: Gentianales
- Family: Apocynaceae
- Genus: Hoya
- Species: H. affinis

Binomial name
- Hoya affinis Hemsl.

= Hoya affinis =

Species of plant

Hoya affinis is a species of flowering plant in the dogbane family Apocynaceae, native to the Solomon Islands.

== Description ==
Hoya affinis is a perennial, twining climber with thick, fleshy, elliptical leaves 7.5 to 10 cm long and 4.3 to 5 cm wide. Its umbels of three to twelve flowers reach up to 3.8 cm across, with thick, fleshy, weakly fragrant petals in shades of red to orange-yellow.

== Distribution and habitat ==
The species is native to Nggela Island in the Solomon Islands, where it grows in tropical forest at low elevation, not far above sea level.

== Taxonomy ==
The species was described by the English botanist William Botting Hemsley in 1892. The holotype is held at the Royal Botanic Gardens, Kew (K000348955).

The specific epithet affinis is Latin for "related" or "neighboring," a reference to the plant's close resemblance to other hoyas known at the time.

== See also ==
- List of Hoya species
