= Hoya crassipetiolata =

Scientific classification
- Kingdom: Plantae
- Clade: Tracheophytes
- Clade: Angiosperms
- Clade: Eudicots
- Clade: Asterids
- Order: Gentianales
- Family: Apocynaceae
- Genus: Hoya
- Species: H. crassipetiolata

Binomial name
- Hoya crassipetiolata Aver., V.T.Pham & T.A.Le

Species of plant

Hoya crassipetiolata is a species of Hoya native to Vietnam.

== See also ==
- List of Hoya species
