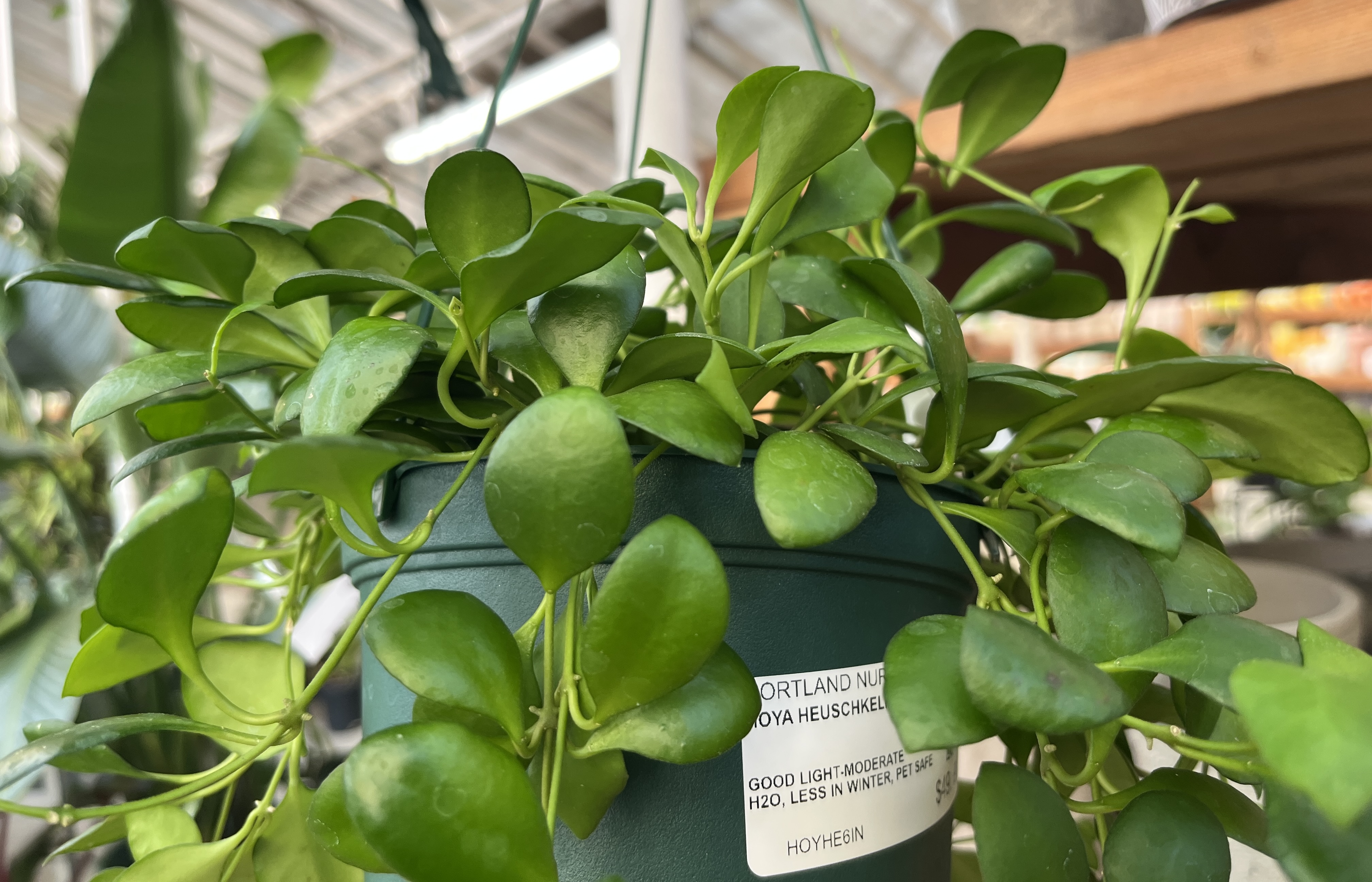
- Potted Hoya heuschkeliana at a nursery, 2025

Scientific classification
- Kingdom: Plantae
- Clade: Tracheophytes
- Clade: Angiosperms
- Clade: Eudicots
- Clade: Asterids
- Order: Gentianales
- Family: Apocynaceae
- Genus: Hoya
- Species: H. heuschkeliana

Binomial name
- Hoya heuschkeliana Kloppenb.

= Hoya heuschkeliana =

Species of plant

Hoya heuschkeliana is a species of Hoya native to the Philippines.

== See also ==
- List of Hoya species
