= Hoya cordata =

Scientific classification
- Kingdom: Plantae
- Clade: Tracheophytes
- Clade: Angiosperms
- Clade: Eudicots
- Clade: Asterids
- Order: Gentianales
- Family: Apocynaceae
- Genus: Hoya
- Species: H. cordata

Binomial name
- Hoya cordata P. T. Li & S. Z. Huang

Species of plant

Hoya cordata is a species of Hoya native to China.

The species is a climbing subshrub, with yellowish grey stems of up to 2 metres (6.6 ft).

The leaves are ovate or oblong-ovate in shape, and measure 5–9 centimetres (2.0–3.5 in) long and 4.5–5 centimetres (1.8–2.0 in) wide. Leaves are thick and leathery when dry. The petals are white.

The species is found in the limestone forests of Guangxi.

== See also ==
- List of Hoya species
