= Hoya archboldiana =

Scientific classification
- Kingdom: Plantae
- Clade: Tracheophytes
- Clade: Angiosperms
- Clade: Eudicots
- Clade: Asterids
- Order: Gentianales
- Family: Apocynaceae
- Genus: Hoya
- Species: H. archboldiana

Binomial name
- Hoya archboldiana C.Norman

Species of plant

Hoya archboldiana is a species in the genus Hoya. It was discovered in Papua New Guinea in 1933. It is cultivated as an ornamental plant, requiring protection in temperate climates, where it may be used as a houseplant. As of February 2016, The Plant List regarded Hoya archboldiana as an unresolved name.
