= Hoya coriacea =

Species of plant

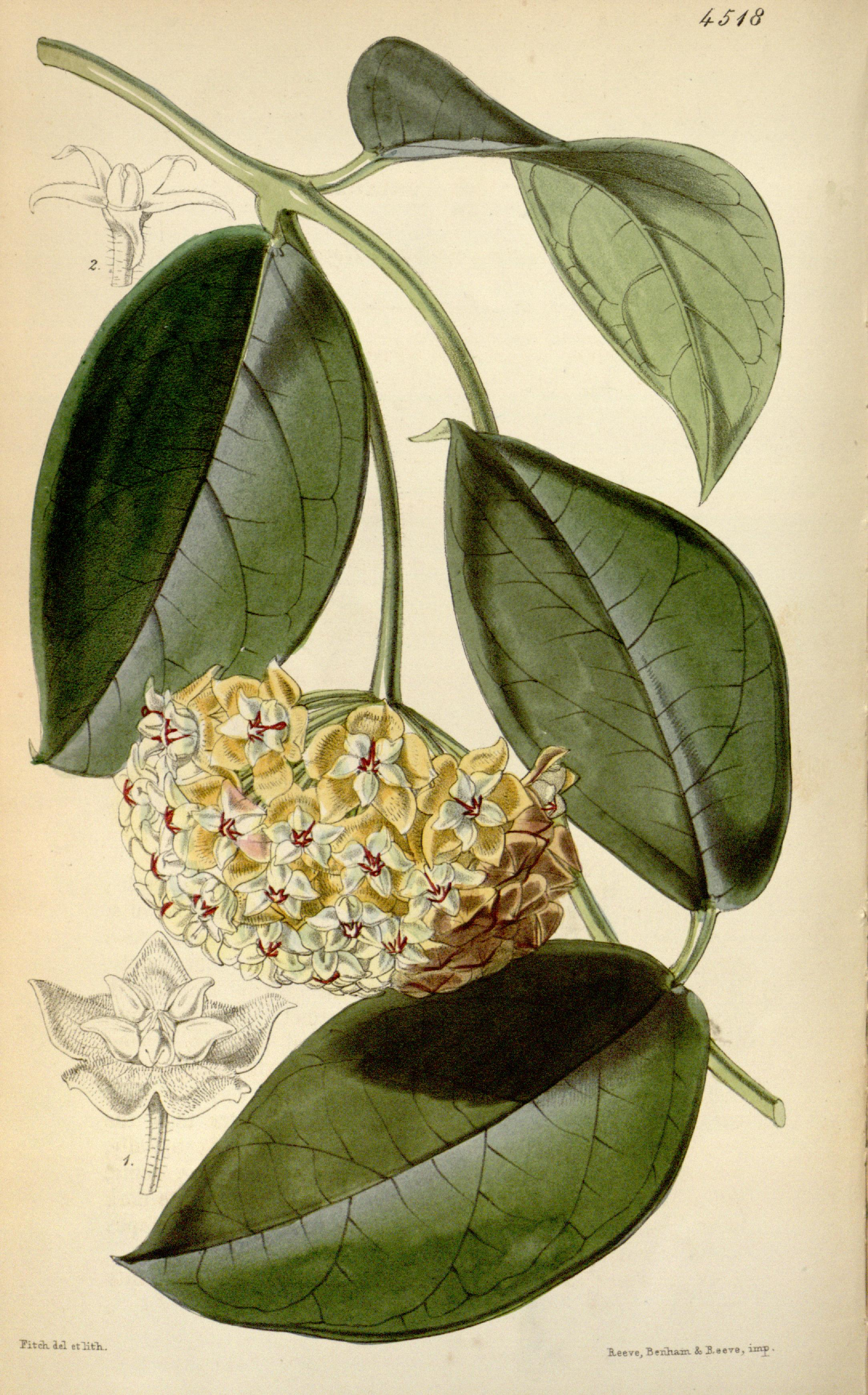
Curtis Botanical Magazine, vol. 76, 1850

Hoya coriacea is a species of Hoya native to Thailand and Malesia.

== See also ==
- List of Hoya species
