= Hoya cutis-porcelana =

Scientific classification
- Kingdom: Plantae
- Clade: Tracheophytes
- Clade: Angiosperms
- Clade: Eudicots
- Clade: Asterids
- Order: Gentianales
- Family: Apocynaceae
- Genus: Hoya
- Species: H. cutis-porcelana

Binomial name
- Hoya cutis-porcelana W.Suarez, J.R.Sahagun & Aurigue

Species of plant

Hoya cutis-porcelana is an endemic species of porcelain flower or wax plant found in Biliran and Samar, Philippines. It is an Asclepiad species of flowering plant in the dogbane family Apocynaceae described in 2013 by W.Suarez, J.R.Sahagun & Aurigue. Hoya cutis-porcelana belongs to the genus Hoya. Although there are no subspecies, hoyas are known to have 350-450 species (Rodda 2015), and they are the largest genus of Apocynaceae listed.

== Etymology ==
The specific epithet, cutis-porcelana literally translate to porcelain skin, which refers to the porcelain-like appearance of the surface of the flowers.
