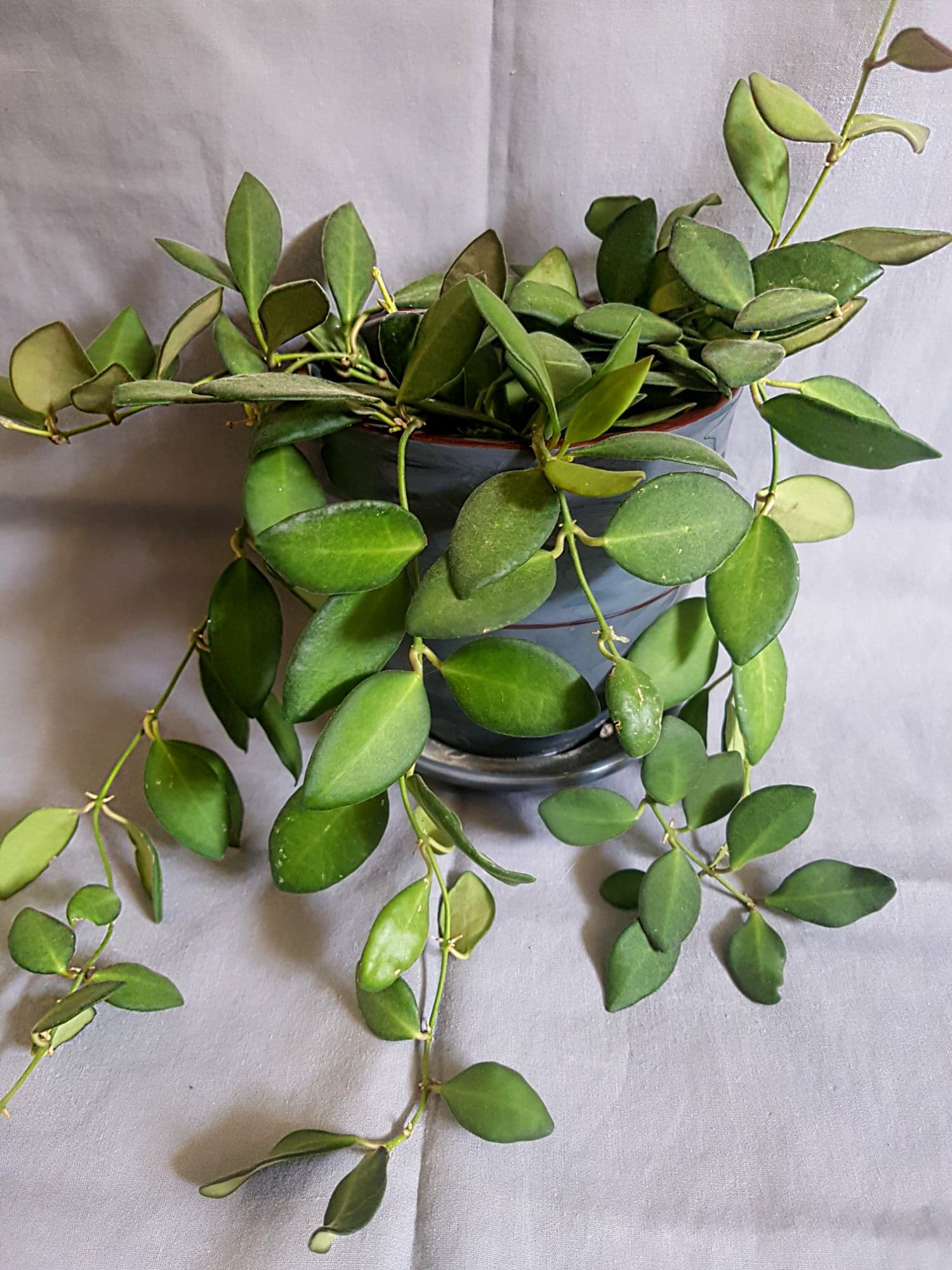
- Hoya bilobata as a houseplant

Scientific classification
- Kingdom: Plantae
- Clade: Tracheophytes
- Clade: Angiosperms
- Clade: Eudicots
- Clade: Asterids
- Order: Gentianales
- Family: Apocynaceae
- Genus: Hoya
- Species: H. bilobata

Binomial name
- Hoya bilobata Schltr.

= Hoya bilobata =

Species of plant

Hoya bilobata, commonly known as wax plant or porcelain flower, is a smaller species of the genus Hoya native to the Philippines. Hoya bilobata is just one of over 200 species of the genus Hoya.

== Description ==
Hoya bilobata is an evergreen perennial that is generally found trailing, but can have a climbing habit that grows to 24 inches or longer. H. bilobata can be considered either an epiphyte or a lithophyte.

The H. bilobata leaves have a variable, sub-orbicular or broadly elliptic shape, with the leaf base being rounded to sub-acute and the leaf apex being obtuse-rounded. The adaxial surface of the leaves are a dull, olive-green colour with the abaxial surface being a lighter green. Leaves are generally 1.7–2.2 cm in length and 1.3–1.8 cm in width. Previous to the discovery of Hoya minutiflora, H. bilobata had the smallest recorded flowers of a Hoya. The flower clusters, or umbels, of H. bilobata have light pink petals that spread apart, with the tips curving upwards, to expose their yellow/pink central crowns. H. bilobata flowers have a mild, sweet fragrance. Each umbel can have up to 25 flowers. The umbels are produced from a peduncle 1–3 cm in length, with the petals of the flowers being only 6–7 mm in diameter.

== Taxonomy ==
Hoya bilobata was originally collected on the Philippine island of Mindanao, and sent to Dr. Rudolph Schlechter, a German economic botanist, who first described it in 1906. H. bilobata is one of the many small leaved and flowered Hoyas belonging to Schlechter's section Acanthostemma. Acanthostemma species are characterised as having flowers with hairy corollas, coronas with outer lobes ending in two inward turning lateral extensions, and petal lobes that are completely revolute.

A study by Wanntorp et al. (2006) found Hoya bilobata to be most closely related to Hoya heuschkeliana, as far as recognised species go, through sequencing of nuclear and chloroplast DNA.

== Cultivation ==
Hoya plants often mislabelled as Hoya bilobata or Hoya tsangii in garden centers and big-box stores are actually Hoya sp. DS-70. This happens because the foliage of the three species so closely resemble each other, it is nearly impossible to differentiate between them without seeing the blooms of the plant. The difference between H. bilobata and H. sp. DS-70 is that the leaves of bilobata are non-pubescent and the flowers are smaller. This makes finding an actual H. bilobata more difficult to find than the H. sp DS-70.

Hoya bilobata prefers temperatures between 60–95 °F. Outdoors, it can be grown in a bright shaded area, and indoors it does best in bright indirect light. Like most Hoyas, Hoya bilobata should be potted in a light, airy potting medium. A good mix is equal parts sphagnum moss, perlite, and orchid bark which will allow for sufficient drainage to prevent root rot. Hoya species tend to grow better in smaller pots, which allows for their roots to become pot-bound. This can also encourage flowering.

Propagation can easily be done by separation or stem cuttings. Cuttings must have at least one node from which roots can grow from. Cuttings can be rooted directly in soil although this does not tend to be as successful, or they can be rooted in water or dampened sphagnum moss and then transferred to soil once adequate roots have been established.
