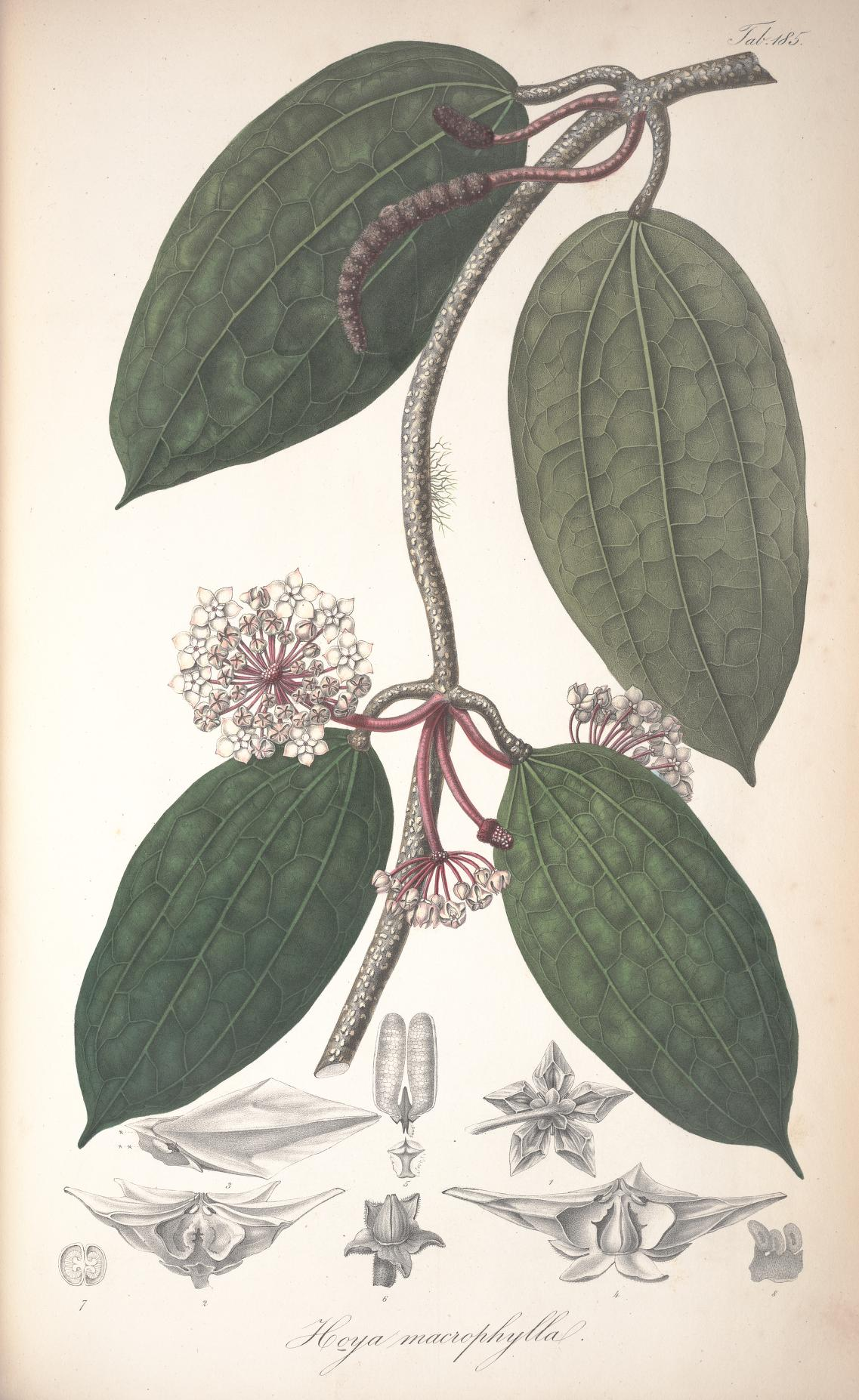
- An 1858 illustration by Carl Ludwig Blume

Scientific classification
- Kingdom: Plantae
- Clade: Tracheophytes
- Clade: Angiosperms
- Clade: Eudicots
- Clade: Asterids
- Order: Gentianales
- Family: Apocynaceae
- Genus: Hoya
- Species: H. macrophylla

Binomial name
- Hoya macrophylla Blume

Synonyms
- Hoya browniana Koord.; Hoya cinnamomifolia Hook.; Hoya cinnamomifolia var. purpureofusca (Hook.) Kloppenb.; Hoya coccinea Lem.; Hoya lindaueana Koord.; Hoya purpureofusca Hook.; Hoya tenggerensis Bakh.f.

= Hoya macrophylla =

Species of plant

Hoya macrophylla is a species of flowering plant in the family Apocynaceae, native to Borneo, Java, the Lesser Sunda Islands, Malaya, Sumatra and Vietnam.

== Description ==
The species has relatively large foliage for hoyas, with the name macrophylla meaning broad-leaved.

== See also ==
- List of Hoya species
