= Hoya bicolensis =

Scientific classification
- Kingdom: Plantae
- Clade: Tracheophytes
- Clade: Angiosperms
- Clade: Eudicots
- Clade: Asterids
- Order: Gentianales
- Family: Apocynaceae
- Genus: Hoya
- Species: H. bicolensis

Binomial name
- Hoya bicolensis Kloppenb., Siar & Cajano, 2012

Species of plant

Hoya bicolensis is an endemic species of porcelain flower or wax plant found in the Philippines, an Asclepiad species of flowering plant in the dogbane family Apocynaceae described in 2012 by Kloppenburg, Siar & Cajano. Hoya bicolensis belongs to the genus Hoya.

== Etymology ==
The specific epithet in the scientific name, bicolensis was named after the Bicol region, a region at the southernmost tip of Luzon island, the place where the species was collected.
