= Hoya megalaster =

Scientific classification
- Kingdom: Plantae
- Clade: Tracheophytes
- Clade: Angiosperms
- Clade: Eudicots
- Clade: Asterids
- Order: Gentianales
- Family: Apocynaceae
- Genus: Hoya
- Species: H. megalaster

Binomial name
- Hoya megalaster Warb. ex K.Schum. & Lauterb.

Species of plant

Hoya megalaster is a species in the genus Hoya. It was discovered in Papua New Guinea in the late 19th century. It is cultivated as an ornamental plant, requiring protection in temperate climates, where it may be used as a houseplant. As of February 2016, The Plant List regarded Hoya megalaster as an unresolved name.
