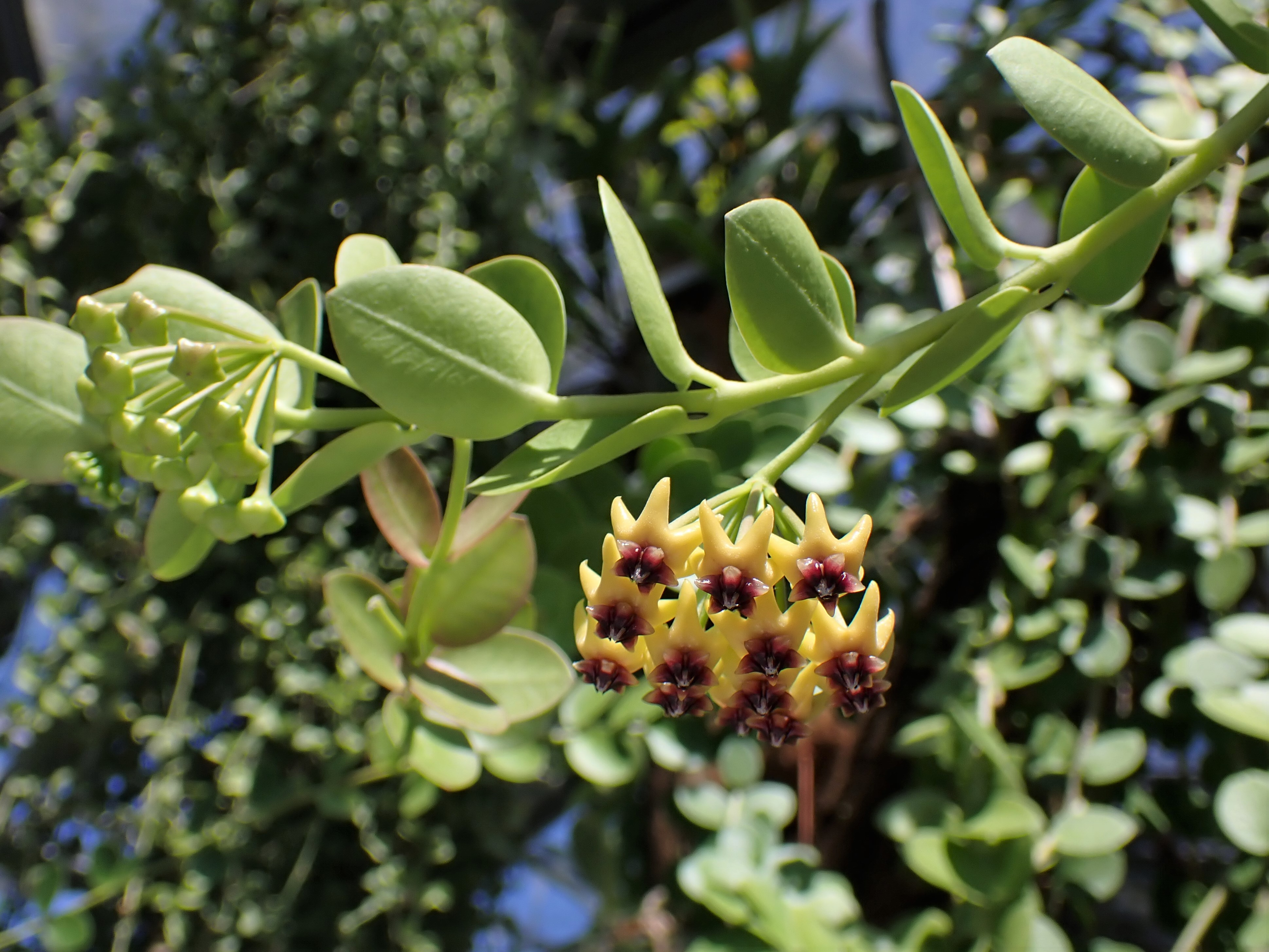
- Hoya cumingiana in the Botanischer Garten, Berlin-Dahlem, 2022

Scientific classification
- Kingdom: Plantae
- Clade: Tracheophytes
- Clade: Angiosperms
- Clade: Eudicots
- Clade: Asterids
- Order: Gentianales
- Family: Apocynaceae
- Genus: Hoya
- Species: H. cumingiana

Binomial name
- Hoya cumingiana Decne.

= Hoya cumingiana =

Species of plant

Hoya cumingiana is a species of Hoya native to Borneo, Jawa, and the Philippines.

== See also ==
- List of Hoya species
