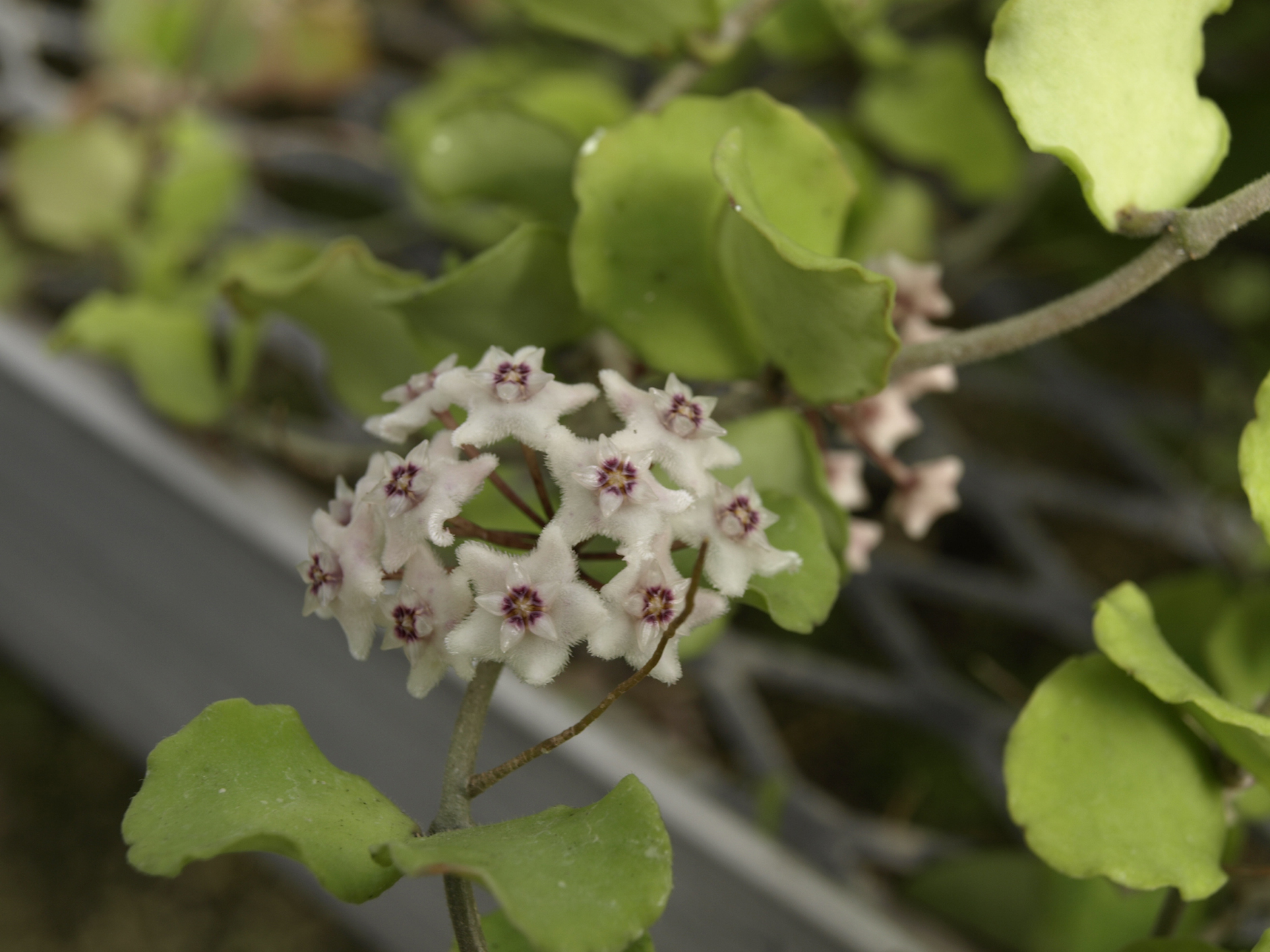
- In Miami, Florida

Scientific classification
- Kingdom: Plantae
- Clade: Tracheophytes
- Clade: Angiosperms
- Clade: Eudicots
- Clade: Asterids
- Order: Gentianales
- Family: Apocynaceae
- Genus: Hoya
- Species: H. kanyakumariana

Binomial name
- Hoya kanyakumariana A.N.Henry & Swamin.

= Hoya kanyakumariana =

Species of plant

Hoya kanyakumariana is a species of flowering plant in the family Apocynaceae. It is native to Tamil Nadu, India, and is named for the Kanniyakumari area in which it was first collected. An epiphytic or lithophytic climber, it is typically found in the wet tropics. As an ornamental it is valued for its lush foliage, attractive, fragrant flowers, and compact growth habit, and is considered suitable for smaller gardens, containers, and hanging planters.
