= Hoya fauziana =

Scientific classification
- Kingdom: Plantae
- Clade: Tracheophytes
- Clade: Angiosperms
- Clade: Eudicots
- Clade: Asterids
- Order: Gentianales
- Family: Apocynaceae
- Genus: Hoya
- Species: H. fauziana

Binomial name
- Hoya fauziana Rodda, Simonsson & A.Lamb

Species of plant

Hoya fauziana is a species of Hoya native to Borneo.

== See also ==
- List of Hoya species
