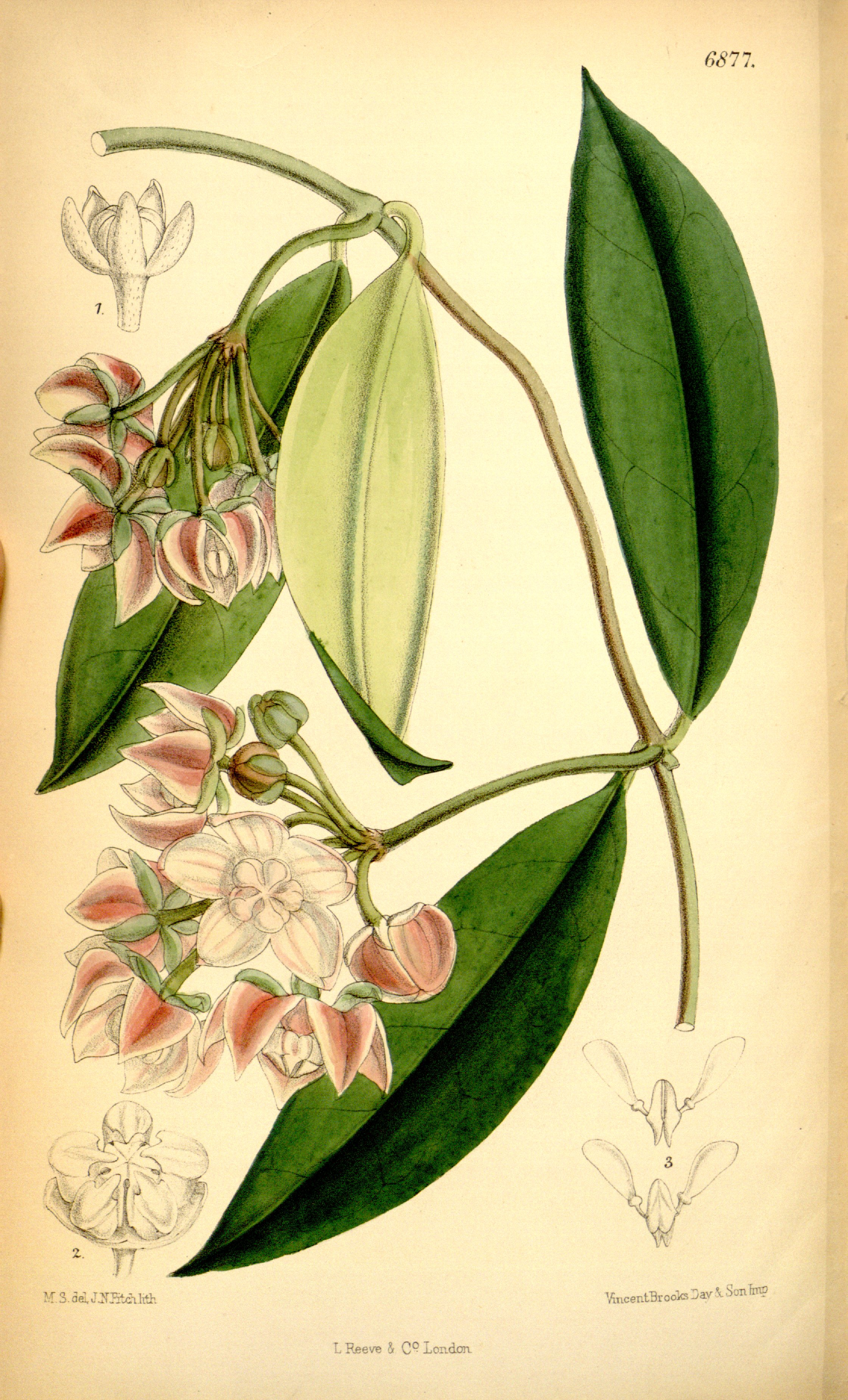
- Botanical illustration

Scientific classification
- Kingdom: Plantae
- Clade: Tracheophytes
- Clade: Angiosperms
- Clade: Eudicots
- Clade: Asterids
- Order: Gentianales
- Family: Apocynaceae
- Genus: Hoya
- Species: H. griffithii

Binomial name
- Hoya griffithii Hook.f.

Synonyms
- Hoya kwangsiensis Tsiang & P.T.Li; Hoya lancilimba Merr.; Hoya lancilimba f. tsoii (Merr.) Tsiang; Hoya tsoii Merr.

= Hoya griffithii =

Species of plant

Hoya griffithii is a species of flowering plant in the family Apocynaceae. It is native to subtropical forests of Assam, Myanmar, southern China, Hainan, Laos, and Vietnam. An epiphyte with stems reaching 1.5 m (5 ft), it is found at elevations around 800 m (2,600 ft). It is valued as a houseplant by Hoya enthusiasts due to its ease of care, and its large fragrant flowers.
