= Hoya benstoneana =

Scientific classification
- Kingdom: Plantae
- Clade: Tracheophytes
- Clade: Angiosperms
- Clade: Eudicots
- Clade: Asterids
- Order: Gentianales
- Family: Apocynaceae
- Genus: Hoya
- Species: H. benstoneana

Binomial name
- Hoya benstoneana Kloppenb., Siar, Guevarra & Carandang, 2012

Species of plant

Hoya benstoneana is an endemic species of porcelain flower or wax plant found in the Philippines is an Asclepiad species of flowering plant in the dogbane family Apocynaceae described in 2012 by Kloppenburg, Siar, Guevarra & Carandang. Hoya benstoneana belongs to the genus Hoya.

== Etymology ==
The specific epithet, benstoneana named in honor of Dr. Benjamin C. Stone, who worked as a Principal investigator of the Flora of the Philippines Project.
