= Hoya persicina =

Scientific classification
- Kingdom: Plantae
- Clade: Tracheophytes
- Clade: Angiosperms
- Clade: Eudicots
- Clade: Asterids
- Order: Gentianales
- Family: Apocynaceae
- Genus: Hoya
- Species: H. persicina

Binomial name
- Hoya persicina Kloppenb., Siar, Guevarra, Carandang & G.Mend, 2012

Species of plant

Hoya persicina is an endemic species of porcelain flower or wax plant found in the Philippines is an Asclepiad species of flowering plant in the dogbane family Apocynaceae described in 2012 by Kloppenburg, et al.. The species corolla in its flower is peach-colored.

== Etymology ==
The specific epithet in the scientific name, persicina was due to the species peach-colored corolla.
