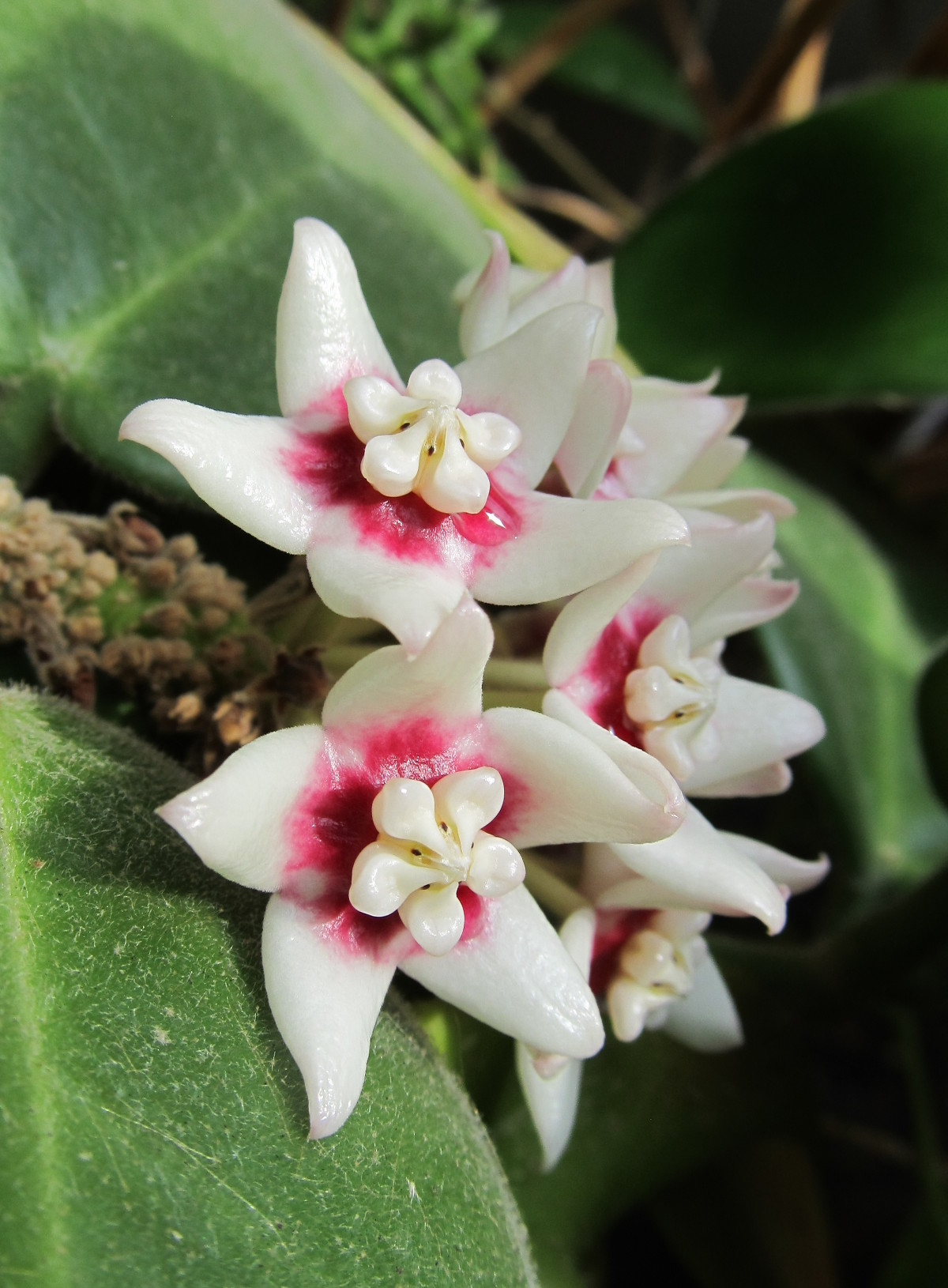
- Close-up of flowers
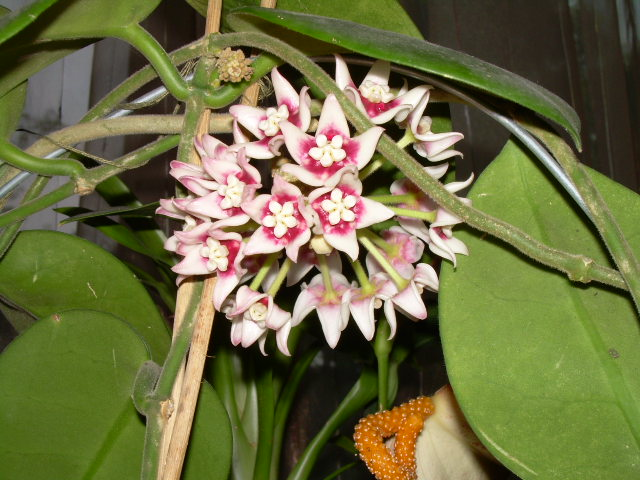
- Habit

Scientific classification
- Kingdom: Plantae
- Clade: Tracheophytes
- Clade: Angiosperms
- Clade: Eudicots
- Clade: Asterids
- Order: Gentianales
- Family: Apocynaceae
- Genus: Hoya
- Species: H. calycina

Binomial name
- Hoya calycina Schltr.

= Hoya calycina =

Species of plant

Hoya calycina is a species of flowering plant in the family Apocynaceae. It is native to New Guinea and the Bismarck Archipelago. A climber, it is typically found in the wet tropics. As a houseplant it is valued by Hoya enthusiasts for its fragrant flowers.

== Subtaxa ==
The following subspecies are accepted:

- Hoya calycina subsp. calycina – Central and eastern New Guinea, Bismarck Archipelago
- Hoya calycina subsp. glabrifolia P.I.Forst. & Liddle – Northern and eastern New Guinea
