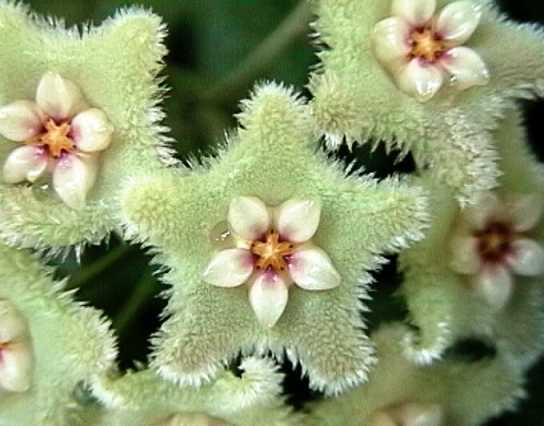

Scientific classification
- Kingdom: Plantae
- Clade: Tracheophytes
- Clade: Angiosperms
- Clade: Eudicots
- Clade: Asterids
- Order: Gentianales
- Family: Apocynaceae
- Genus: Hoya
- Species: H. serpens

Binomial name
- Hoya serpens Hook.f.

= Hoya serpens =

Species of plant

Hoya serpens is a small trailing vine found in the Himalayas and surrounding areas.

== Description ==
It has small round leaves that are 1.5 to 2 cm long. The leaves are dark green, hairy, and have grey spots intermittently dispersed.

The flowers produced are extremely fuzzy with a light green corolla and a white corona with a bit of pink towards the center of the flower, with finally a yellow center. The flowers last about a week, and unlike other Hoyas, produce very little nectar. Additionally, the flowers produce a sweet fragrance.

== Taxonomy ==
It was first discovered and published by Joseph Dalton Hooker in 1883.

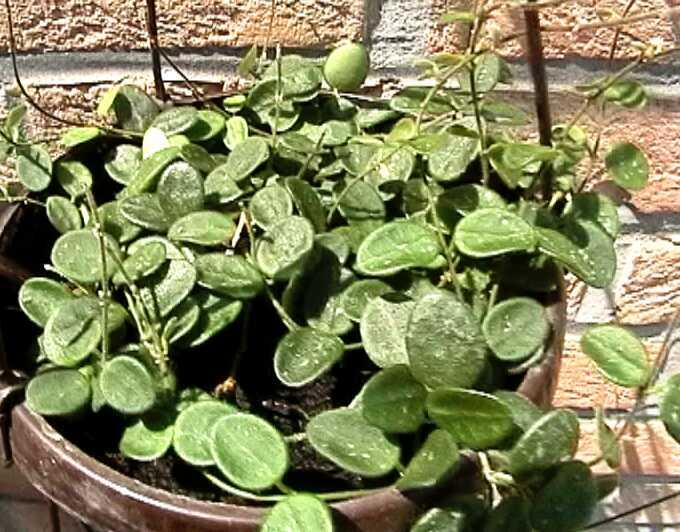
