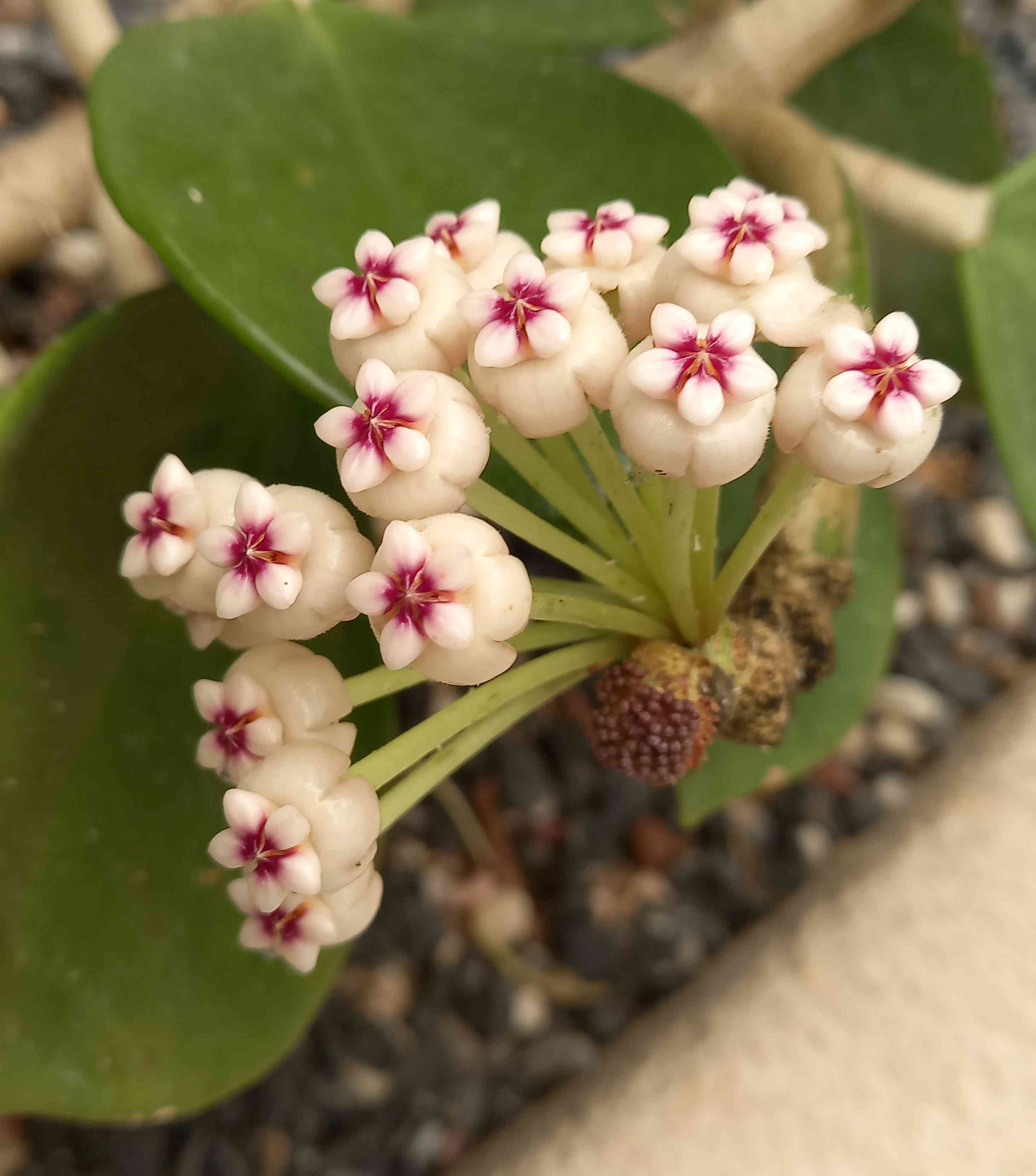
- Flowers of Hoya pachyclada

Scientific classification
- Kingdom: Plantae
- Clade: Tracheophytes
- Clade: Angiosperms
- Clade: Eudicots
- Clade: Asterids
- Order: Gentianales
- Family: Apocynaceae
- Genus: Hoya
- Species: H. pachyclada

Binomial name
- Hoya pachyclada Kerr

= Hoya pachyclada =

Species of plant

Hoya pachyclada is a species of plant in the genus Hoya native to seasonally dry tropical forests in Southeast Asia. First identified in 1939, its species name refers to its relatively thick, fleshy stems. It grows as an epiphyte on trees in Laos, Cambodia, Thailand, and Vietnam.
