= Hoya aphylla =

Scientific classification
- Kingdom: Plantae
- Clade: Tracheophytes
- Clade: Angiosperms
- Clade: Eudicots
- Clade: Asterids
- Order: Gentianales
- Family: Apocynaceae
- Genus: Hoya
- Species: H. aphylla

Binomial name
- Hoya aphylla Aver., K.S.Nguyen & Averyanova

Species of plant

Hoya aphylla is a species of Hoya native to Laos.

== See also ==
- List of Hoya species
