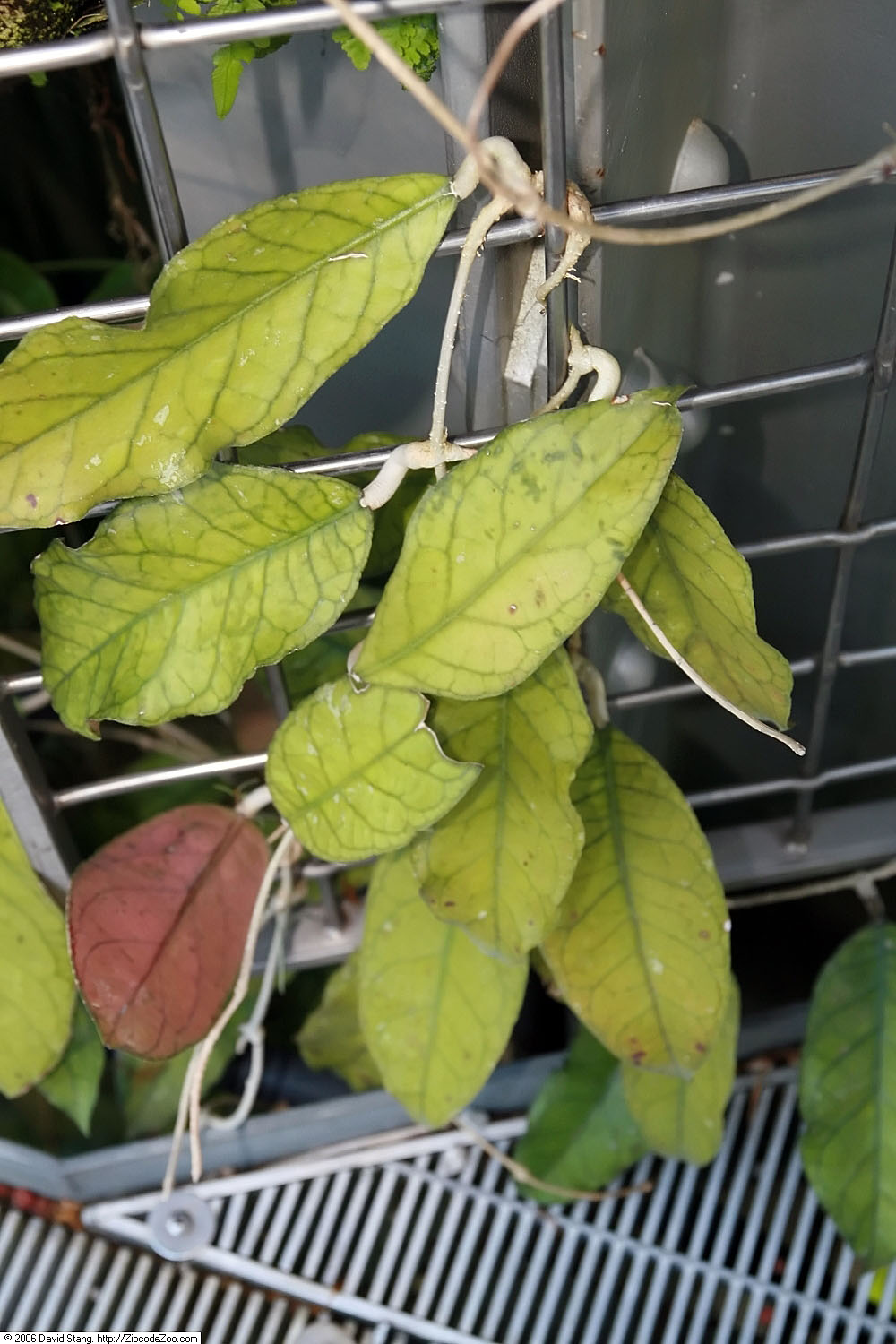

Scientific classification
- Kingdom: Plantae
- Clade: Tracheophytes
- Clade: Angiosperms
- Clade: Eudicots
- Clade: Asterids
- Order: Gentianales
- Family: Apocynaceae
- Genus: Hoya
- Species: H. meredithii

Binomial name
- Hoya meredithii T.Green

= Hoya meredithii =

Species of plant

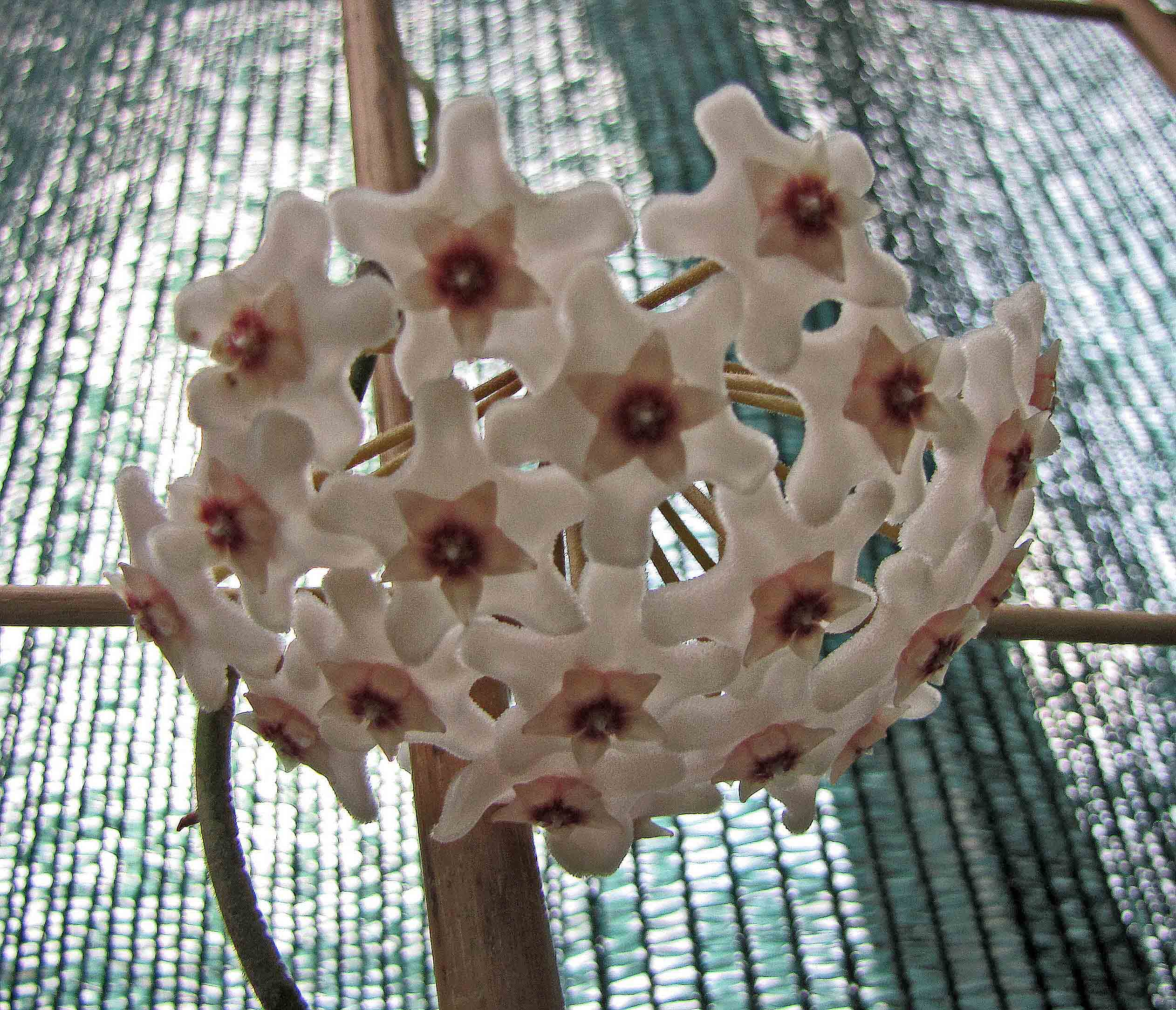
Flower

Hoya meredithii is a species of Hoya native to Borneo.

== Description ==
Hoya meredithii is a branching vine growing as an epiphyte or terrestrially. The leaves are borne in loose opposite pairs, occasionally singly, and are hard and rigid, 12–30 cm long and 7.5–18 cm wide, with pinnate venation of 8–12 secondary veins that appear dark against a lighter blade. The inflorescence is a hemispherical umbel of numerous pale chartreuse flowers about 1 cm across, borne on a persistent peduncle up to 10 cm long; the corona is greenish white. Flowering occurs from April to June, with individual flowers lasting about four days and producing nectar.

== Distribution and habitat ==
The species is known from Bau, Sarawak, in Malaysian Borneo. The type material was collected at about 35 m elevation, on calcareous soils in open lowland forest.

== Taxonomy ==
The species was described by Ted Green in 1988 in Phytologia, from a plant cultivated at his nursery in Kaaawa, Hawaii. The material had been collected at Bau, Sarawak, in July 1980 and was vouchered in 1981. The holotype is held at the Bernice P. Bishop Museum (BISH), with a duplicate at the New York Botanical Garden. Green compared the species with Hoya globulosa, distinguishing it by its much larger leaves and its semi-globose rather than globose inflorescence.

The species is named for York Meredith, whom Green described as "the plantsman, of Dee Why, Australia who discovered it".

== See also ==
- List of Hoya species
