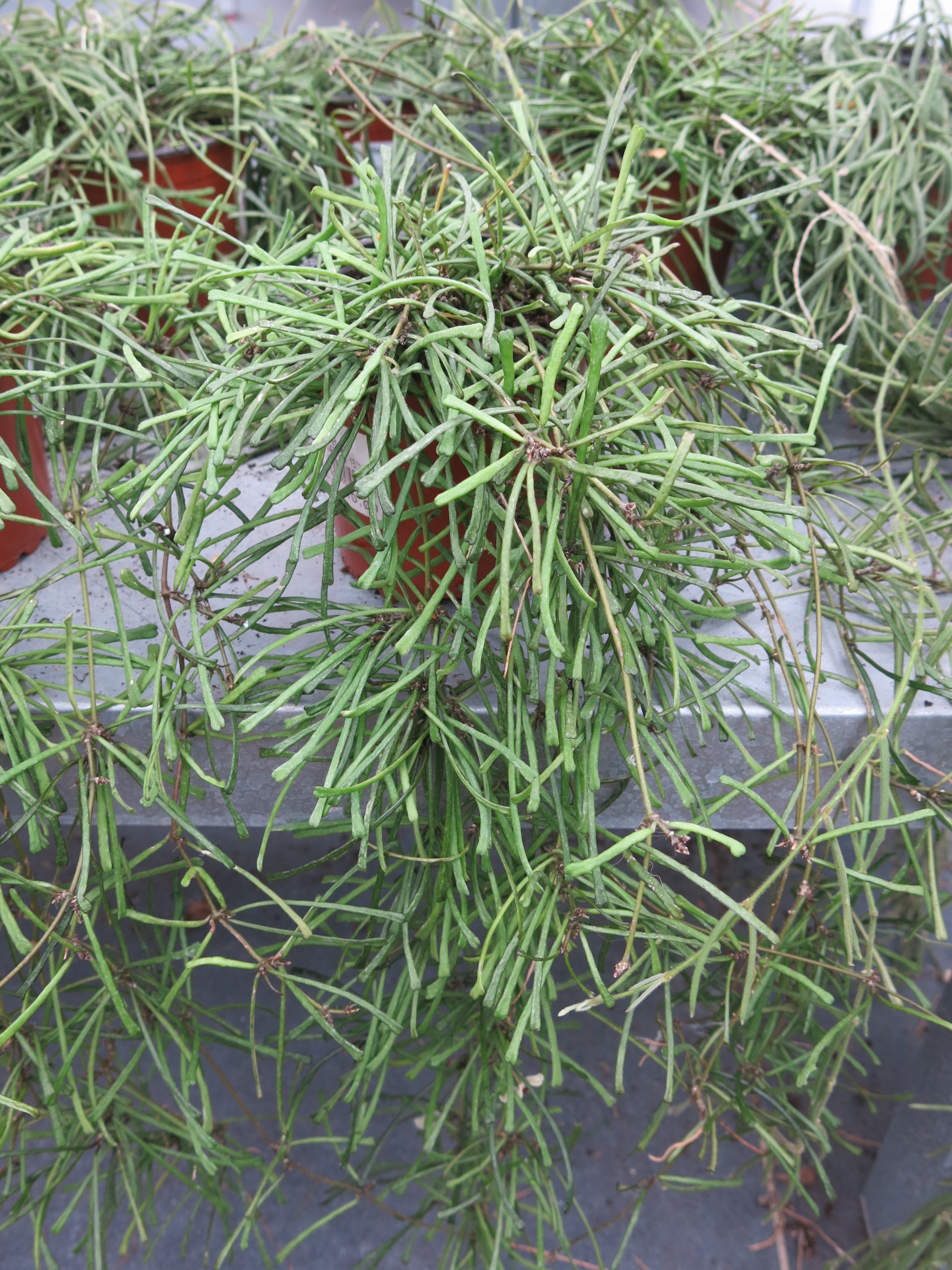
- Hoya retusa potted as a houseplant

Scientific classification
- Kingdom: Plantae
- Clade: Tracheophytes
- Clade: Angiosperms
- Clade: Eudicots
- Clade: Asterids
- Order: Gentianales
- Family: Apocynaceae
- Genus: Hoya
- Species: H. retusa

Binomial name
- Hoya retusa Govaerts

= Hoya retusa =

Species of flowering plant

Hoya retusa is a species of flowering plant in the genus Hoya native to India and the eastern Himalayas. It is an epiphyte.

== Etymology ==
The plant's specific epithet retusa refers to the shape, with retuse meaning it has a rounded leaf apex with a notch.

== Description ==
Hoya retusa grows in clumps with long stems hanging downwards. It grows in a trailing habit and the foliage is succulent. The leaves arise in clusters. The flowers are fragrant, star-shaped having creamy petals and red corona at center.
