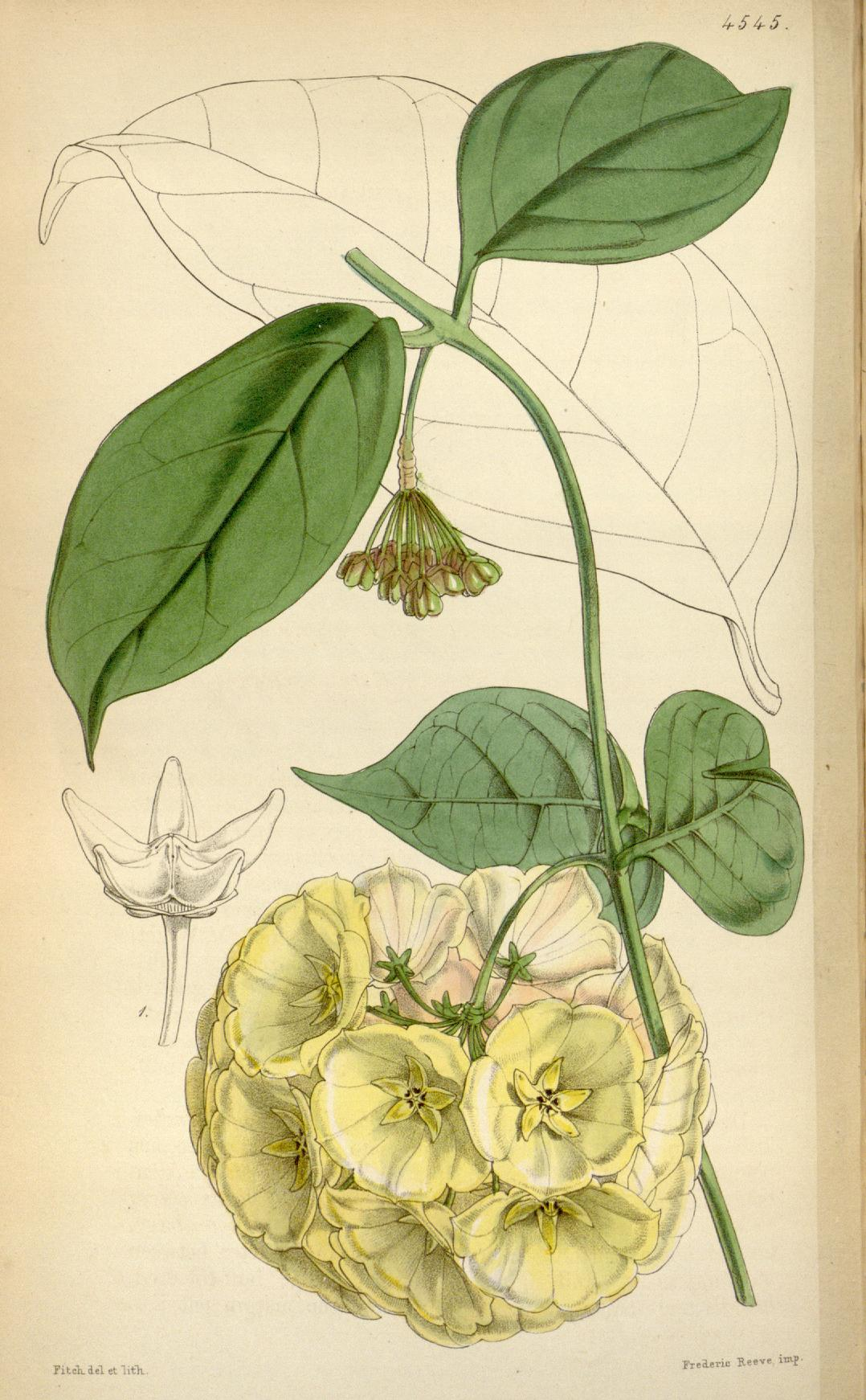
- Botanical illustration

Scientific classification
- Kingdom: Plantae
- Clade: Tracheophytes
- Clade: Angiosperms
- Clade: Eudicots
- Clade: Asterids
- Order: Gentianales
- Family: Apocynaceae
- Genus: Hoya
- Species: H. campanulata

Binomial name
- Hoya campanulata Blume

= Hoya campanulata =

Species of plant

Hoya campanulata is a species of Hoya native to W. Malesia.

== See also ==
- List of Hoya species
