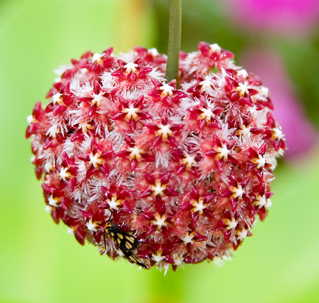
- Inflorescence
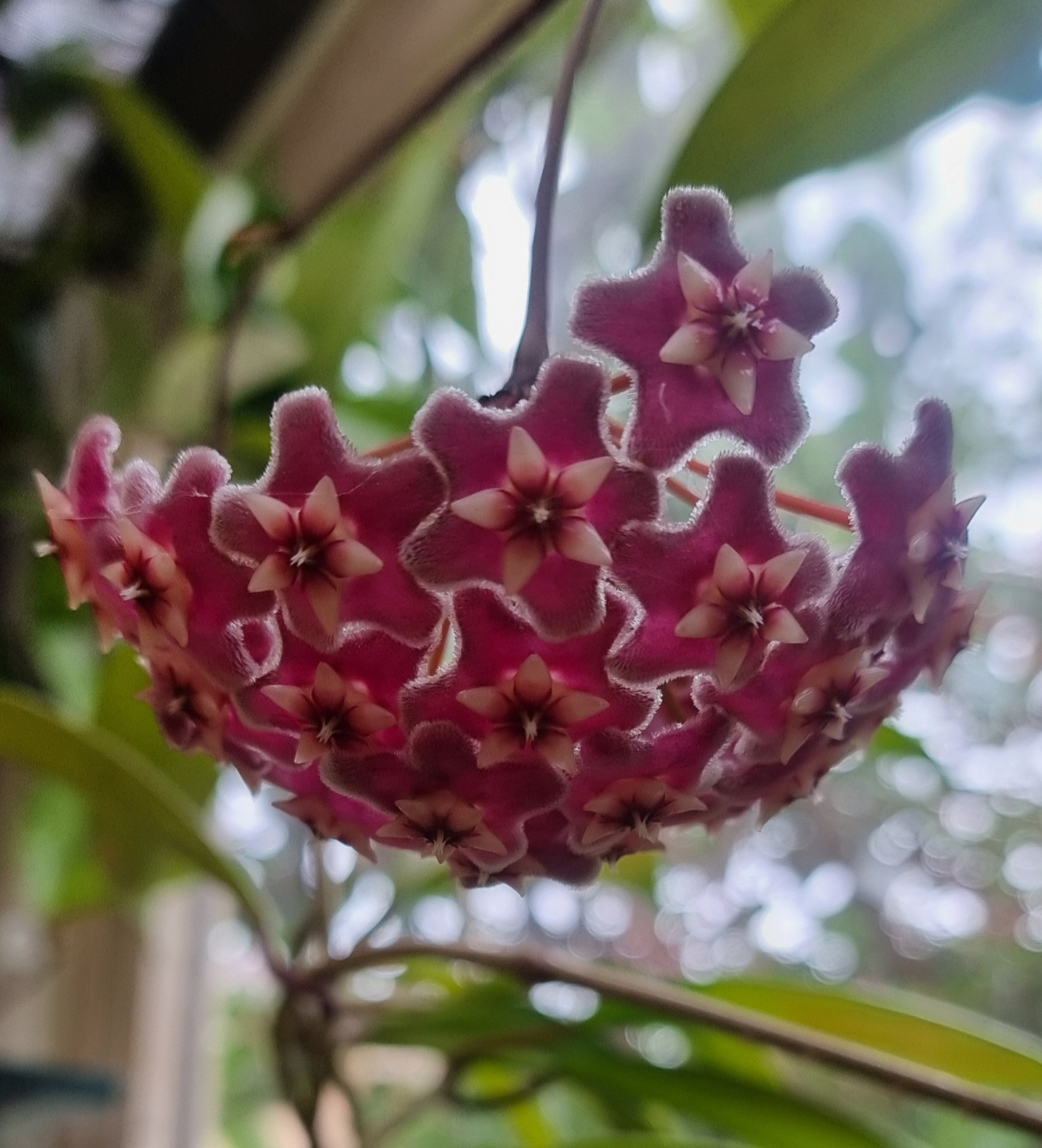
- A specimen in Australia

Scientific classification
- Kingdom: Plantae
- Clade: Embryophytes
- Clade: Tracheophytes
- Clade: Spermatophytes
- Clade: Angiosperms
- Clade: Eudicots
- Clade: Asterids
- Order: Gentianales
- Family: Apocynaceae
- Genus: Hoya
- Species: H. mindorensis

Binomial name
- Hoya mindorensis Schltr.

Synonyms
- Hoya mindorensis subsp. mendozae Kloppenb. & Ferreras

= Hoya mindorensis =

Species of plant

Hoya mindorensis, the Mindoro hoya, is a species of flowering plant in the family Apocynaceae. It is native to the Philippines and northern and central Borneo. An epiphytic or climbing shrub, it is typically found in the wet tropics. It is recommended for containers, hanging baskets, and smaller gardens. There appears to be a cultivar, 'Yellow'.

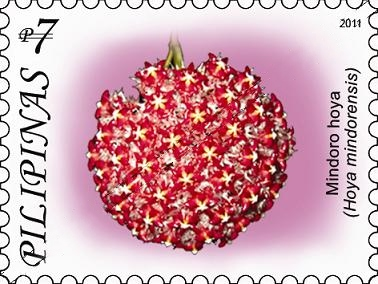
Called Mindoro hoya on a Philippines postage stamp

== Subtaxa ==
The following subspecies are accepted:

- Hoya mindorensis subsp. bulusanensis Kloppenb. – Luzon
- Hoya mindorensis subsp. dinagatensis Kloppenb. – Philippines
- Hoya mindorensis subsp. lagyoensis Kloppenb. & G.Mend. – Philippines
- Hoya mindorensis subsp. mindorensis – Philippines, northern and central Borneo; salmon colored corolla and pink corona
- Hoya mindorensis subsp. philippinensis Kloppenb. – Philippines
- Hoya mindorensis subsp. sarawakensis Kloppenb. – Sarawak
