= Hoya cinnamomifolia =

Scientific classification
- Kingdom: Plantae
- Clade: Tracheophytes
- Clade: Angiosperms
- Clade: Eudicots
- Clade: Asterids
- Order: Gentianales
- Family: Apocynaceae
- Genus: Hoya
- Species: H. cinnamomifolia

Binomial name
- Hoya cinnamomifolia Hooker

Species of plant

Hoya cinnamomifolia is a vine that comes from the island of Java.

== Description ==
It is one of the larger members of the Hoya genus with typically one leaf per node. Each leaf is large, dark green, and has lighter colored veins that run parallel to the leaf. The leaves can get as big as 15 cm by 6 cm. Hoya cinnamomifolia got its name due to the resemblance of its leaves to those of Cinnamomum verum.

The flowers produced come in umbels of 20-30 and have a lime green corolla and bright burgundy corona. The corolla of each flower appears bent backwards and the corona protrudes out but has a flat surface. On the flowers is produced a sugary nectar and the flowers are rather short lived. Each flower is 2 cm in diameter.
