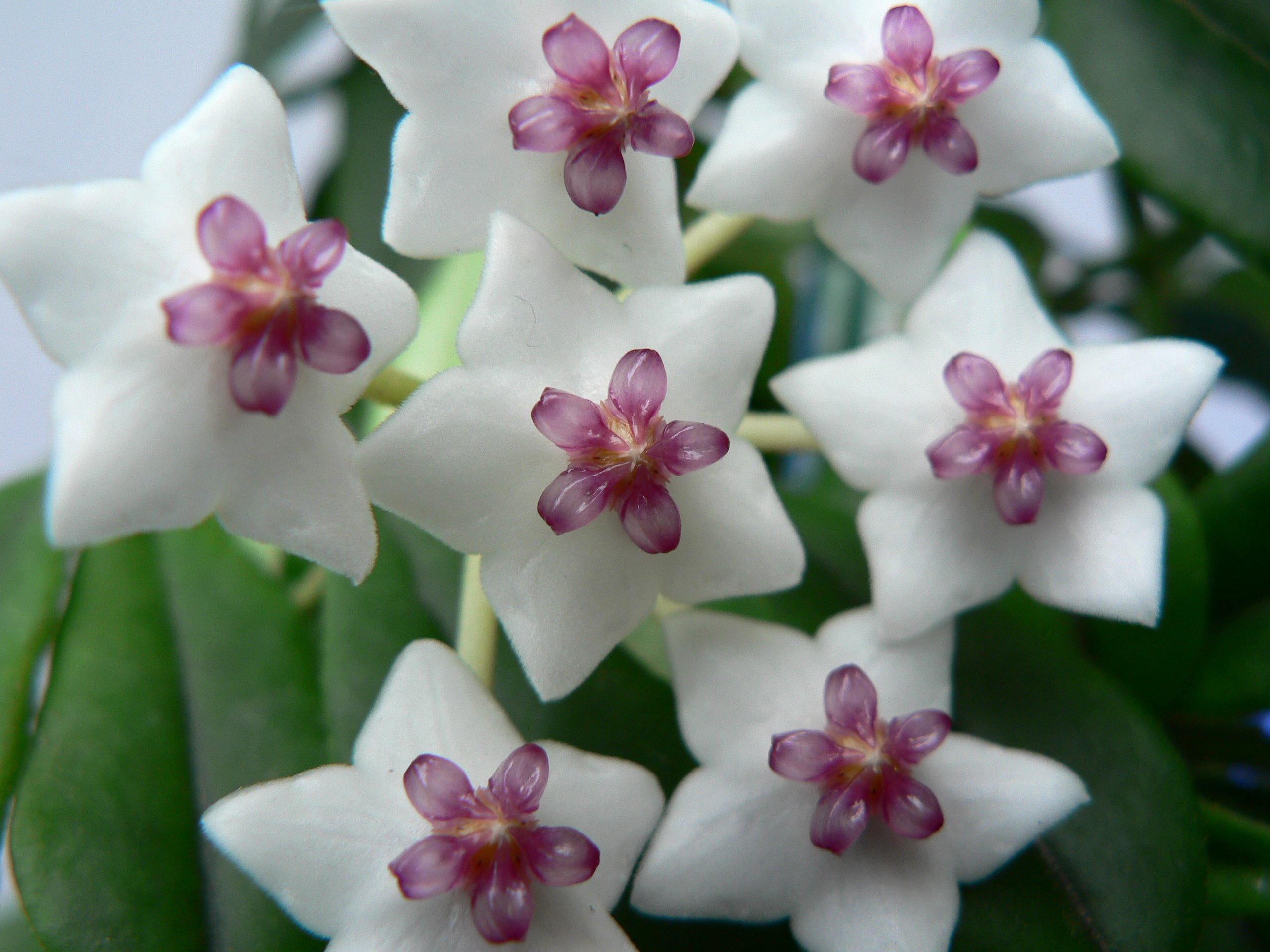
- Hoya lanceolata subsp. bella

Scientific classification
- Kingdom: Plantae
- Clade: Embryophytes
- Clade: Tracheophytes
- Clade: Spermatophytes
- Clade: Angiosperms
- Clade: Eudicots
- Clade: Asterids
- Order: Gentianales
- Family: Apocynaceae
- Subfamily: Asclepiadoideae
- Tribe: Marsdenieae
- Genus: Hoya; R.Br.

Species
- See List of Hoya species

Synonyms
- Absolmsia Kuntze (1891), nom. superfl.; Acanthostemma Blume (1849); Anatropanthus Schltr. (1908); Antiostelma (Tsiang & P.T.Li) P.T.Li (1992); Astrostemma Benth. (1880); Cathetostemma Blume (1849); Centrostemma Decne. (1838); Clemensia Schltr. (1915), nom. illeg.; Clemensiella Schltr. (1915); Codonanthus Hassk. (1842); Cyrtoceras Benn. (1838); Cystidianthus Hassk. (1843); Eriostemma (Schltr.) Kloppenb. & Gilding (2001); Hiepia V.T.Pham & Aver. (2011); Madangia P.I.Forst., Liddle & I.M.Liddle (1997); Micholitzia N.E.Br. (1909); Otostemma Blume (1849); Physostelma Wight (1834); Plocostemma Blume (1849); Pterostelma Wight (1834); Schollia J.Jacq. (1811); Sperlingia Martin Vahl (1810); Triacma Hasselt ex Miq. (1857); Triplosperma G.Don (1837)

= Hoya (plant) =

Genus of flowering plants

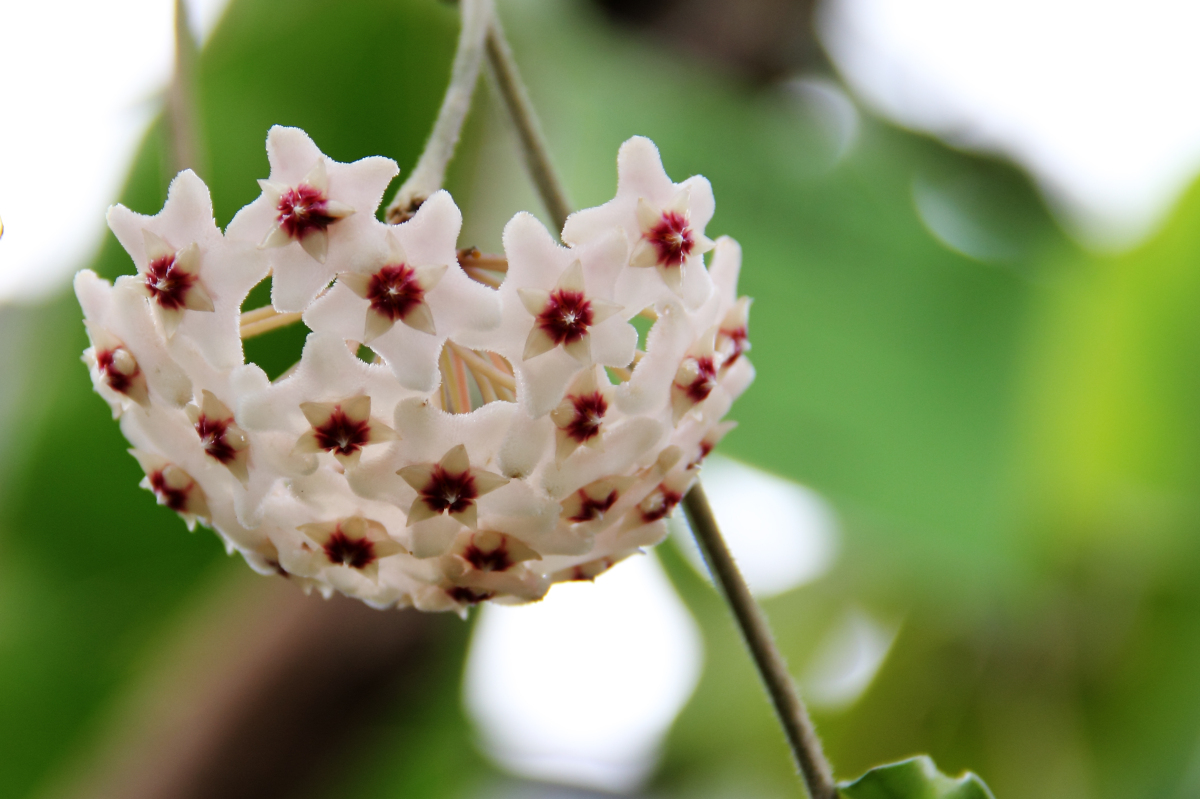
Hoya carnosa

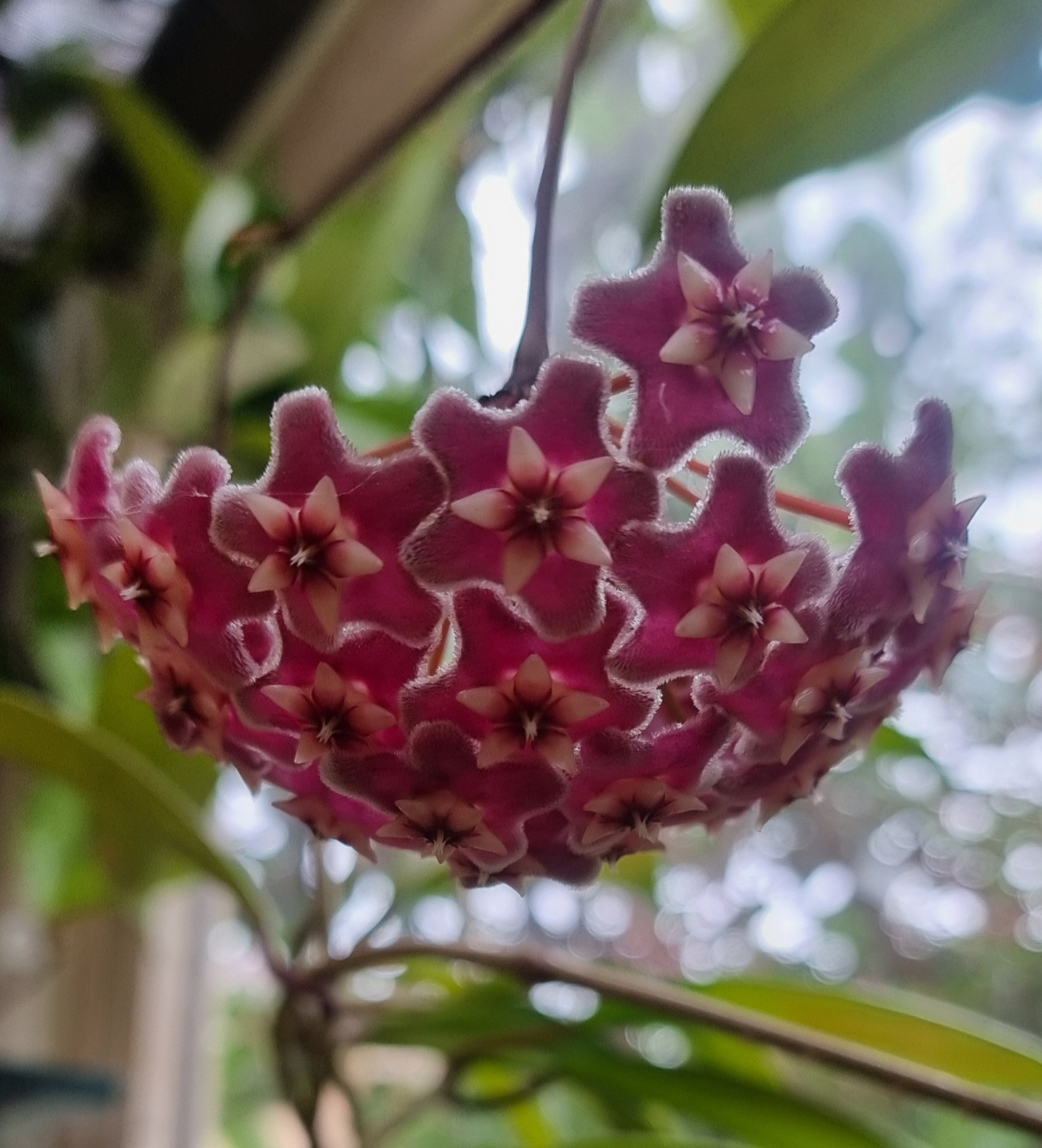
Hoya mindorensis, Sydney, Australia.

Hoya is a genus of over 500 species of plants in the dogbane family, Apocynaceae, commonly known as waxflowers. Plants in the genus Hoya are mostly epiphytic or lithophytic vines, rarely subshrubs, with leathery, fleshy or succulent leaves, shortly tube-shaped or bell-shaped flowers with five horizontally spreading lobes, the flowers in umbels or racemes, and spindle-shaped or cylindrical to oval follicles containing flattened egg-shaped to oblong seeds.

== Description ==
Plants in the genus Hoya are mostly epiphytic or lithophytic vines that rarely form roots in the ground, or rarely more or less shrubby. They have creeping or climbing, pendent, left-twining stems, with white latex, and sometimes with adventitious roots. The stems are cylindrical in cross section, and more or less sparsely branched. The leaves are leathery, often fleshy or succulent, elliptic, egg-shaped, rhomboid or lance-shaped, may be glabrous or hairy, and usually have a petiole.

The flowers are often fleshy or waxy, arranged in umbels or racemes on a peduncle between the leaves, the peduncle usually persisting from year to year. The petals are wheel-shaped or tube-shaped, with five fleshy, more or less jug-shaped, horizontally spreading lobes attached to the staminal column, and forming a prominent ring alternating with the petal lobes.

The fruit is a spindle-shaped to oval follicle containing flattened, egg-shaped to oblong seeds with a tuft of hairs at one end.

== Taxonomy ==
The genus was first formally described in 1810 by botanist Robert Brown in his book Prodromus Florae Novae Hollandiae et Insulae Van Diemen, and honours Thomas Hoy, the gardener for the Duke of Northumberland. The first species of Hoya that Brown described (the type species), was Hoya carnosa.

== Use in horticulture ==
Many species of Hoya are popular houseplants in temperate areas (especially H. carnosa), grown for their attractive foliage and strongly scented flowers. Numerous cultivars have been selected for different leaf forms or flower colours. Hoyas grow well indoors, preferring bright light, but will tolerate fairly low light levels, although they may not flower without bright light. Hoyas commonly sold in nurseries as houseplants include cultivars of H. carnosa ('Tricolor', 'Rubra' & 'Compacta'), H. pubicalyx (often mislabelled as H. carnosa or H. purpurea-fusca), and H. kerrii. Hoyas are easy to propagate, and are commonly grown as a hanging basket or as a potted plant.

Hoya carnosa has been shown in recent studies at the University of Georgia to be an excellent remover of pollutants in the indoor environment.

Various cultures have extensively used hoyas medicinally, leading to a significant decrease in population in some parts of the world.

Some species, (notably Hoya australis) are very toxic to livestock with sheep poisonings in Australia having been reported.

Several Hoya species and cultivars are excellent terrarium plants.

Rachel Colette Conroy was appointed the International Cultivar Registration Authority for Hoya in 2023.

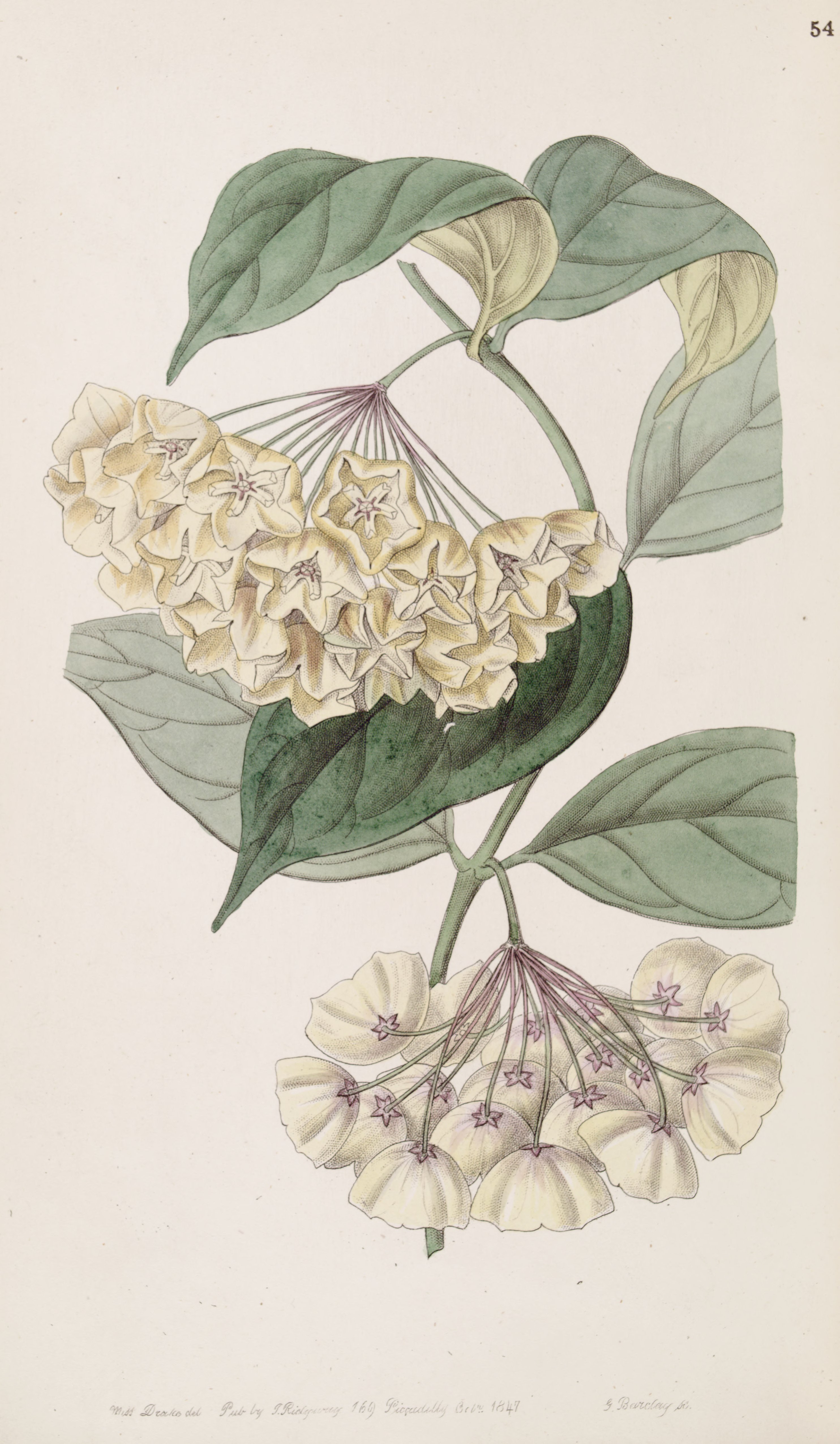
Hoya campanulata

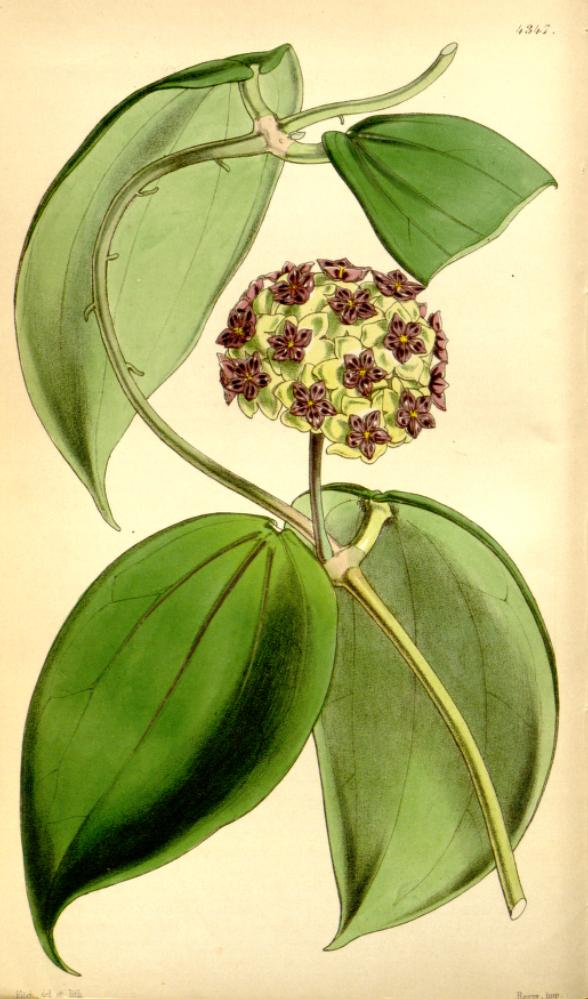
Hoya cinnamomifolia

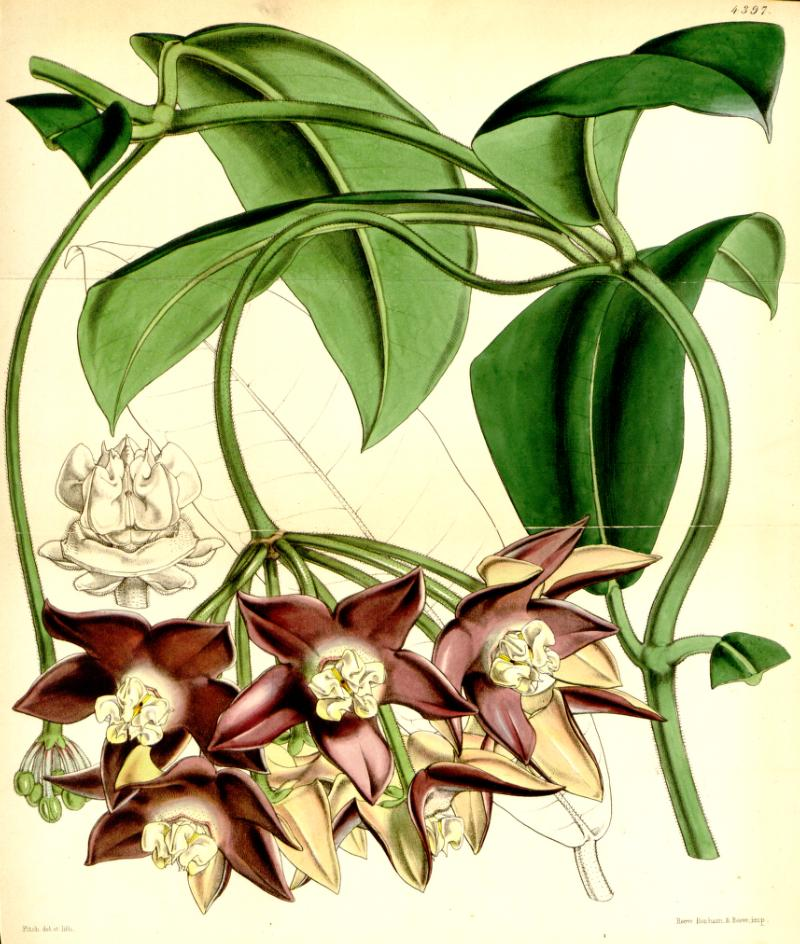
Hoya imperialis

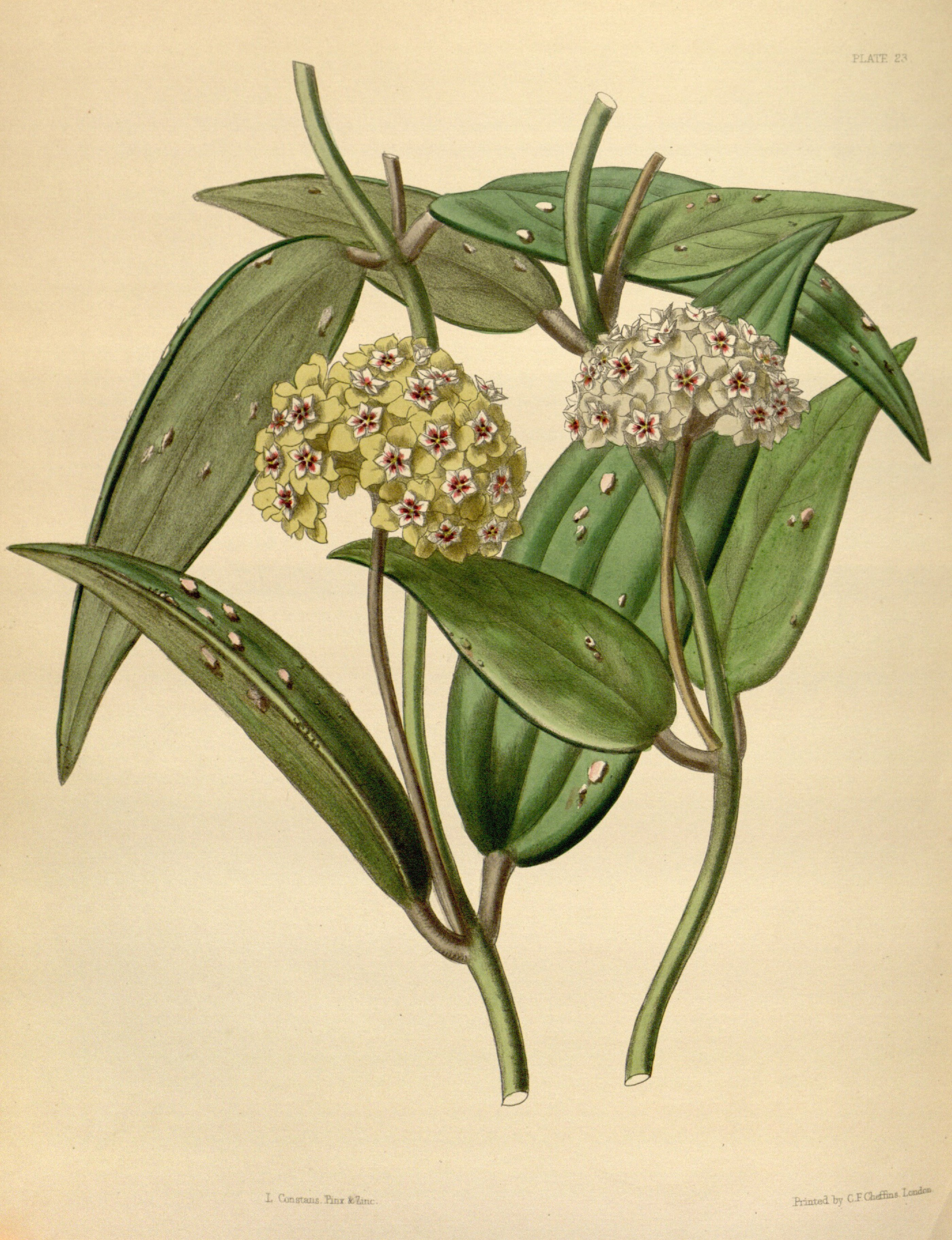
Hoya parasitica

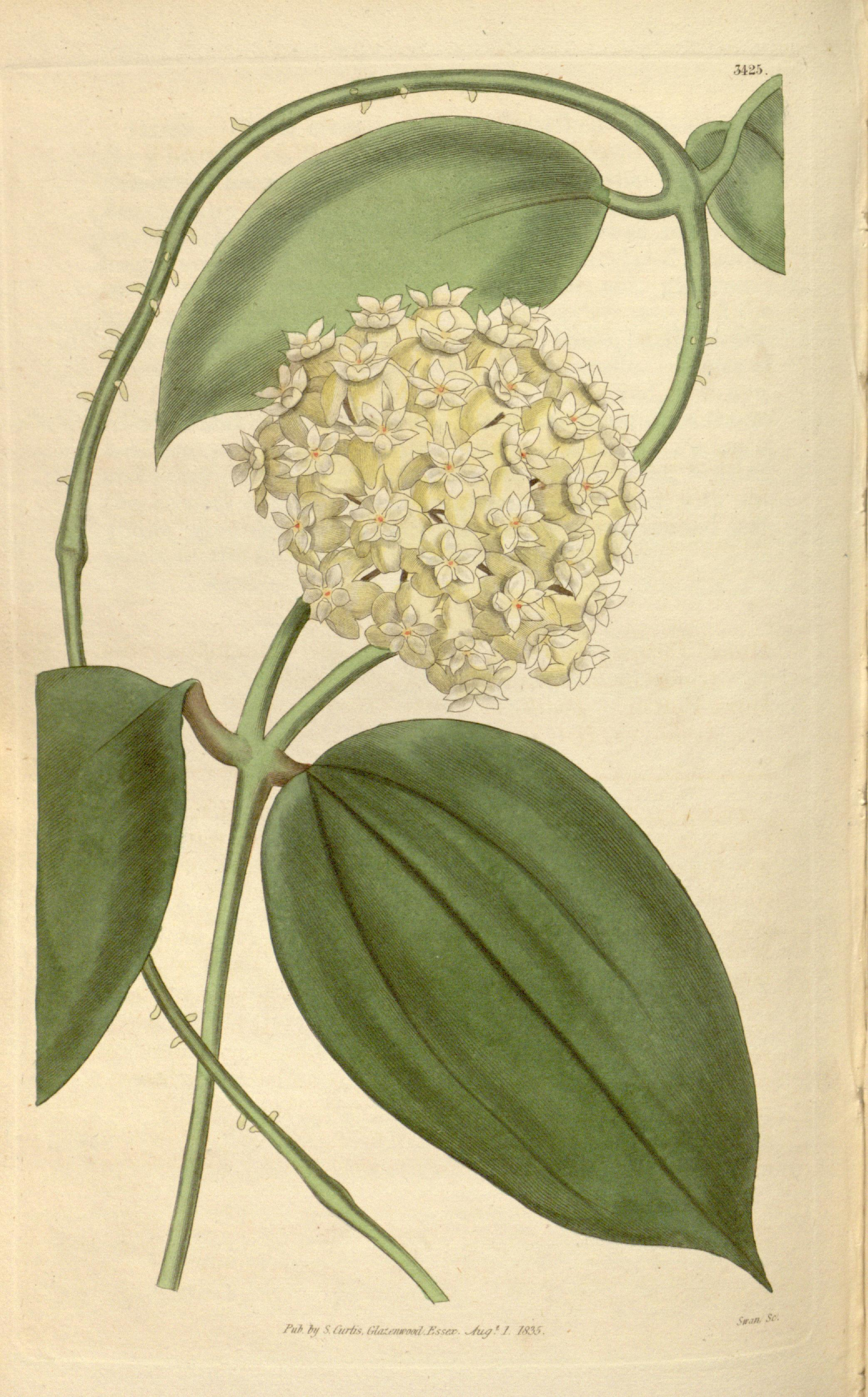
Hoya pottsii
