= The Living Rainforest =

- Interactive map of The Living Rainforest
- 51°28′55″N 1°13′8″W
- Date opened: 1993
- Location: Hampstead Norreys, Newbury, Berkshire, England
- Annual visitors: 95,000
- Memberships: BIAZA, BGCI
- Major exhibits: Amazon Aquarium, Armadillo, Bromeliads, Dwarf Caiman, Fischer's Turaco, Goeldi’s Monkeys, Orchids, Pygmy Marmosets, Snakes, Toucan, Small Islands, Linne's Two-Toed Sloth (named Cinnamon), Sustainable Futures
- Website: livingrainforest.org

The Living Rainforest is an indoor greenhouse tropical rainforest located in Hampstead Norreys in Berkshire, England. It is an ecological centre, educational centre and visitor attraction consisting of three glasshouses, operated and run by the Trust for Sustainable Living. The glasshouses are named Amazonica, Lowlands and Small Islands respectively.

The Living Rainforest has been accredited by the Council for Learning Outside of the Classroom and awarded the LOtC Quality Badge. Each year around 25,000 children visit the Living Rainforest as part of their school's curriculum. It is open 7-days a week from 09:30 to 16:00.

== History ==
The site was once an orchid nursery called Wyld Court Orchids who were well known for their collection of rare and beautiful natural orchid species, especially Cymbidiums and Lycastes. Wyld Court Orchids received considerable recognition from the R.H.S. including a distinction of Grand Champion Hybrid and Best in Show for a home-raised seedling at the British Orchid Council Congress Show. The privately owned ‘Wyld Court Rainforest’ was created in 1991 by philanthropist Keith Bromley (former chairman of the shoe retailer Russell and Bromley) and horticulturalist Barry Findon. Keith Bromley said he was inspired to create Wyld Court Rainforest after sailing in the Orinoco delta in Venezuela in the 1980s. It first opened to the public in April 1993 as a rainforest visitor centre. They donated the facility to the World Land Trust in 1996. On 30 June 2000, ownership of Wyld Court Rainforest Ltd transferred from the World Land Trust to a new company "The Living Rainforest", and has been operated by Karl Hansen as an independent educational charity since July 2000. The centre is home to over 700 plants and animals including rare and endangered species of global conservation value.

== Attractions ==
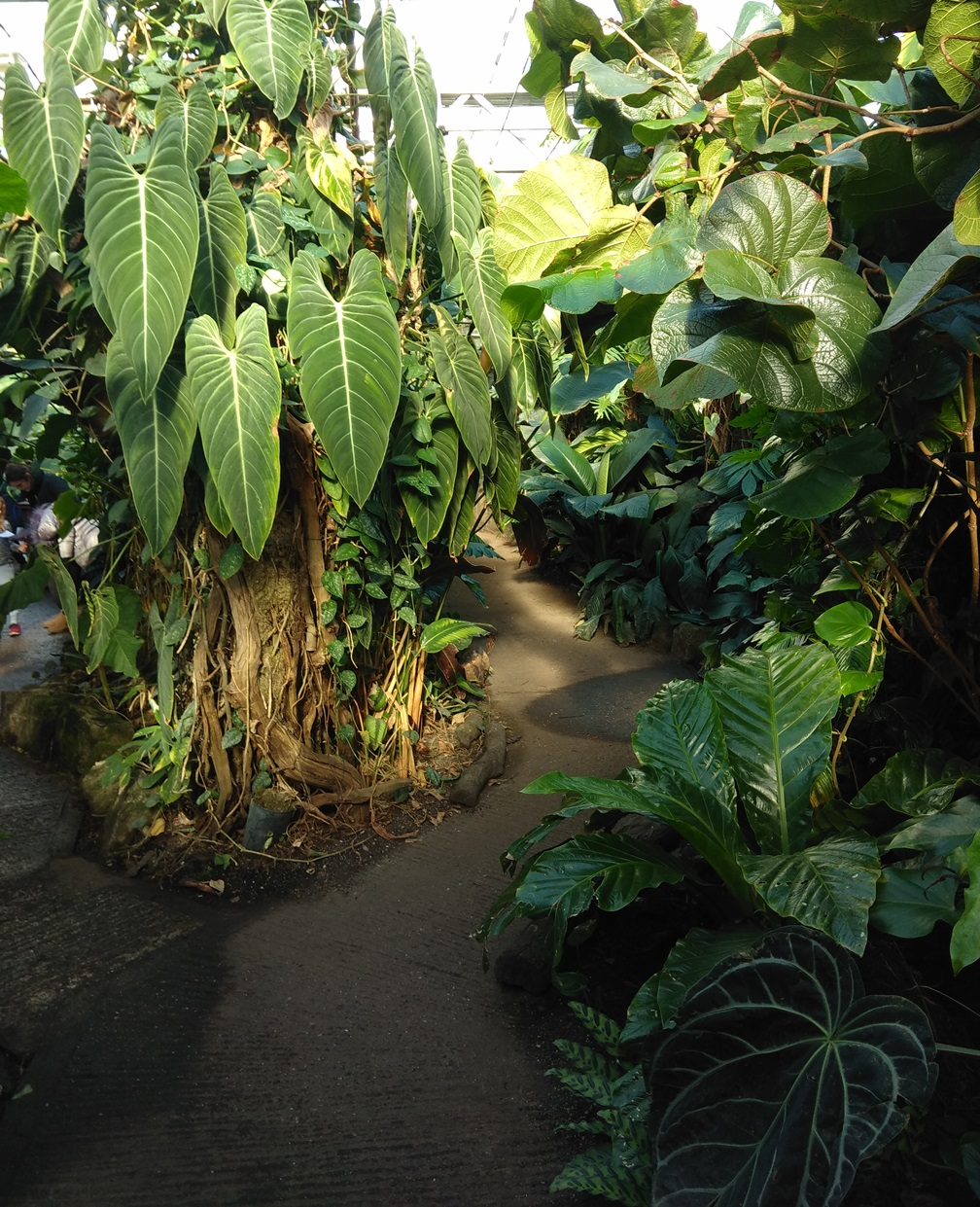
Lowlands Pathway

The visitor attraction consists of three glasshouses that adjoin each other; the flora and fauna in each glasshouse are representative of different layers or areas of tropical rainforests. The rainforest layers represented in the Amazonica and Lowlands glasshouses include the canopy, understory and forest floor layers. The Small Islands glasshouse exhibits shows life at the edge of an island rainforest, the exhibits in this glasshouse are being developed to highlight the issues and concerns faced by Small Island Developing States (SIDS) throughout the world.

The Human Impact Building opened in 2006 incorporating sustainable materials, Low Embodied Energy, passive/natural ventilation, passive solar gain and a small photovoltaic solar array.

There is also a gift shop, café, outdoor adventure-themed children’s playground, and a picnic area with a rainforest theme.

== Exhibits ==
- Dwarf Caiman exhibit – Completed in July 2020, the exhibit is home to one male and one female dwarf caimans.
- Orchid Cloud Forest exhibit – Completed in January 2020, the exhibit features 100 orchid species and other plants from Central and South America.
- Littoral Zone project – Completed in October 2018, this project saw the introduction of plants in Small Islands often found at or just above the high water mark, these, together with the mangroves exhibit, represent the Littoral Zone.
- Bromeliads exhibit – Opened in August 2018, the concept of the exhibit is bromeliads growing on or around a fallen tree.
- Toucan exhibit – Rebuilt in July 2018, this exhibit is home to a channel-billed toucan and a male Azara's agouti.
- Sustainable Futures exhibit – Opened in January 2018, this exhibit consists of interactive displays that include a look at Climate Drawdown.
- Snakes exhibit – Rebuilt in February 2017, this exhibit is home to two emerald tree boas, and a carpet python.
- Small Islands exhibit – Built in August 2016, this exhibit is home to a green iguana, mudskippers, various tropical fish and mangroves
- Armadillo exhibit – Built in 2014, this exhibit is home to a six-banded armadillo.
- Goeldi's Monkeys exhibit – Rebuilt and relocated in 2014, this exhibit is home to two Goeldi's monkeys.
- Fischer's Turacao exhibit – Built in 2010, this exhibit is home to a pair of Fischer's turacos.

== Animals ==
- Blue poison dart frog
- Carpet python
- Channel-billed toucan
- Dwarf caiman
- Emerald tree boa
- Fischer's turaco
- Goeldi's monkey
- Green iguana
- Home's hinge-back tortoise
- Linne's two-toed sloth
- Madagascar hissing cockroach
- Philippines water monitor
- Pygmy marmoset
- Roul Roul partridge
- Six banded armadillo
- Yellow-knobbed curassow
- Ocellate river stingray

== Plants ==
The Plant Collection at The Living Rainforest contains some of the most attractive species of the many tropical plant families such as bananas, bromeliads, calatheas, cinnamon, ficus, gingers, hoyas and orchids. However the highlights of the collection are the Aroids and the Philippine Jade Vine (seasonal). Plants of particular interest include;

- Anthurium clavigerum
- Anthurium crystallinum
- Anthurium magnificum
- Austrocylindropuntia subulata
- Black Anthurium
- Breadfruit
- Giant fern
- Giant taro
- Hoya bhutanica
- Jade bine
- Myriocarpa stipitata
- King Anthurium
- Philodendron melanochrysum
- Philodendron melinonii
- Pitcher plants
- Screw pine
- Silk floss tree
- Travellers palm
- Typhonodorum lindleyanum
- Cocoa tree

== Gallery ==
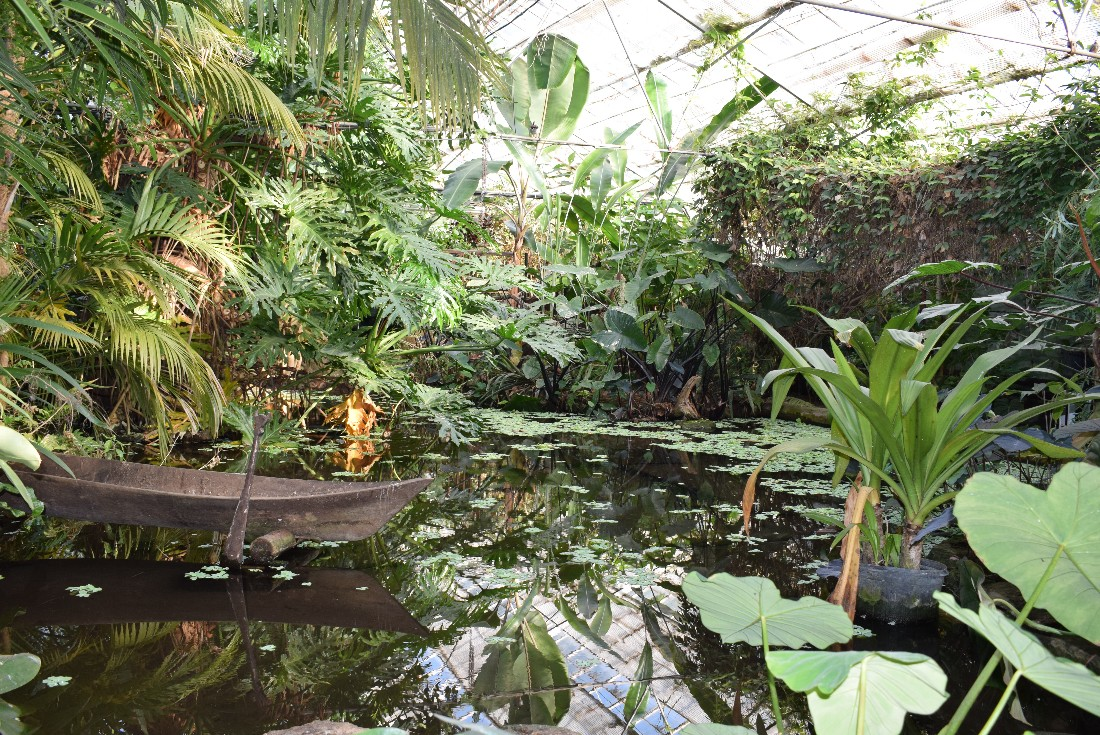
Amazonica Main Pond (North)

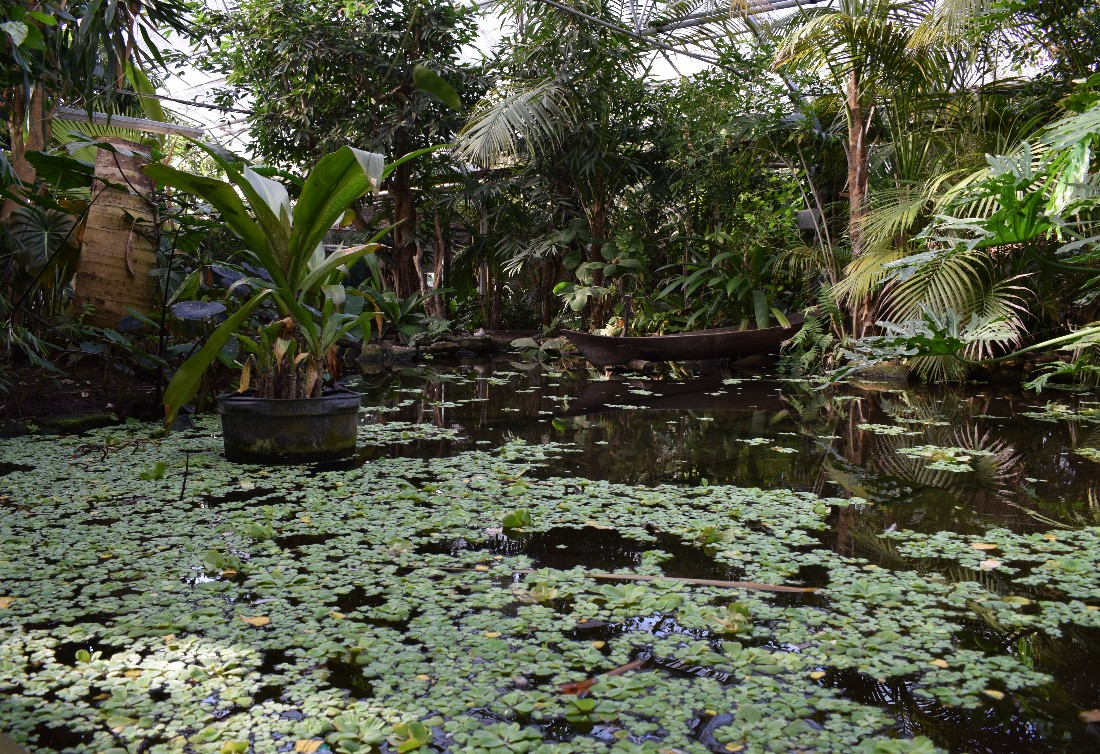
Amazonica Main Pond (East)

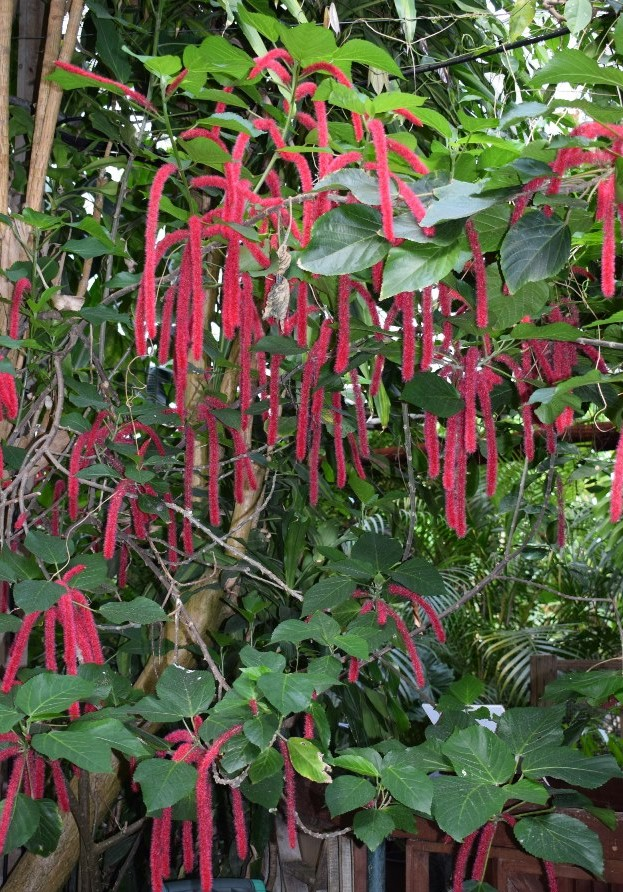
Acalypha hispida

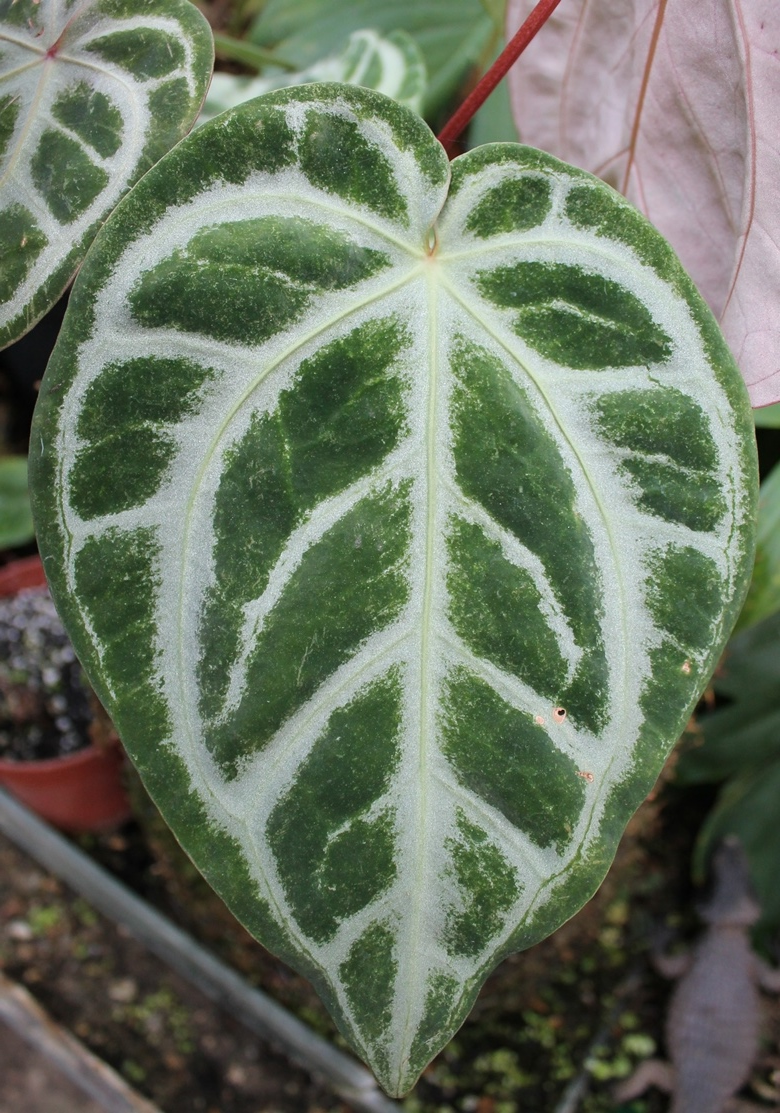
Anthurium crystallinum

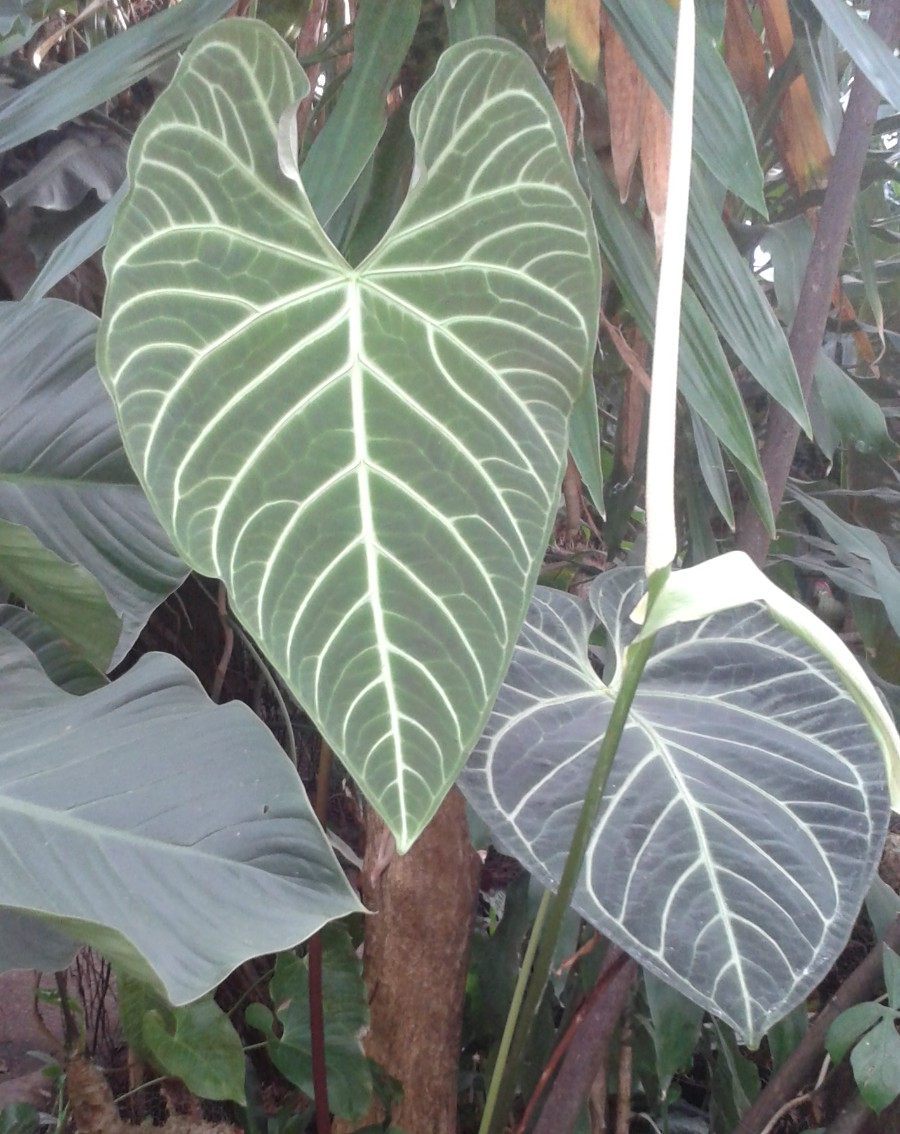
Anthurium regale

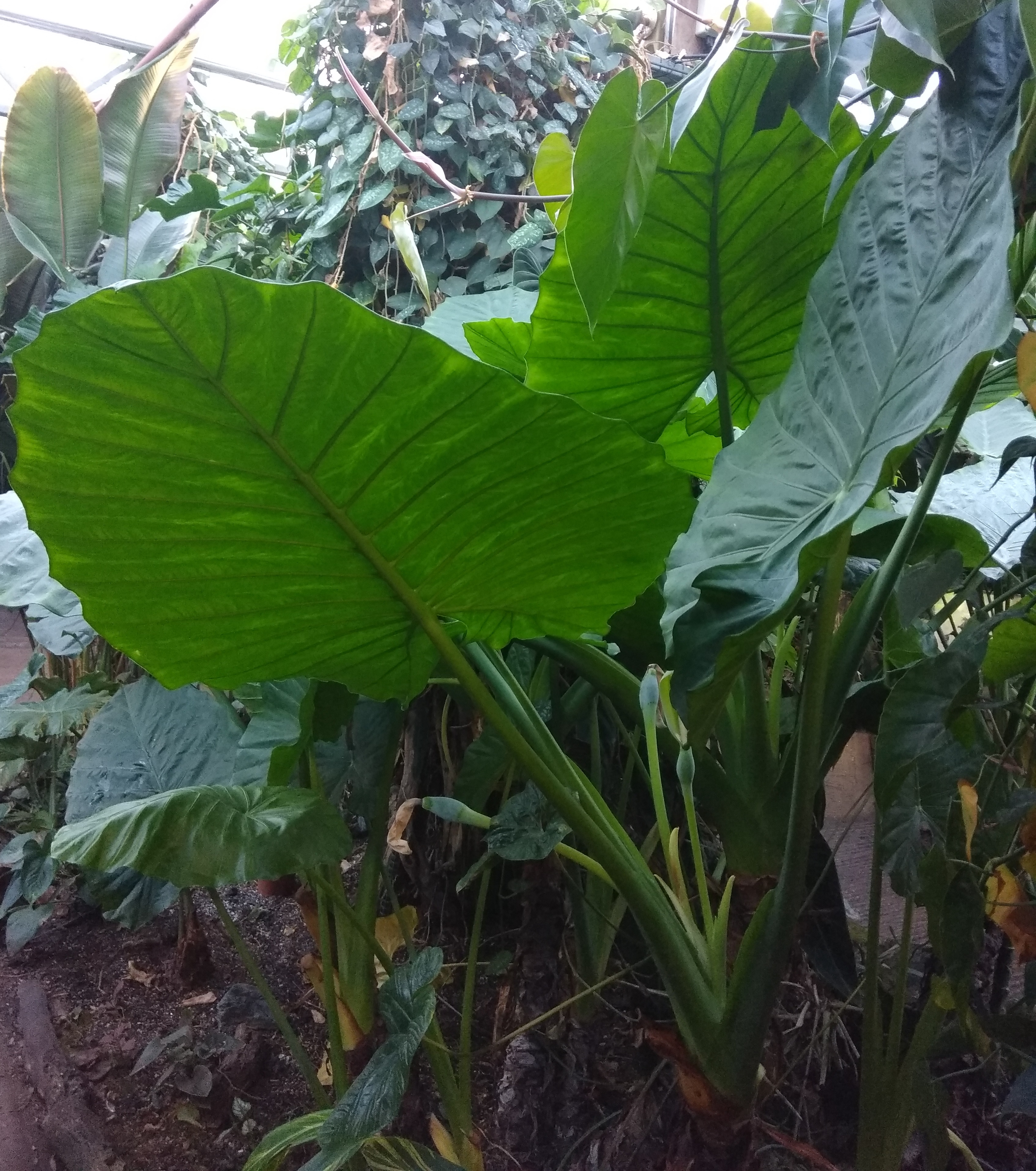
Alocasia calidora

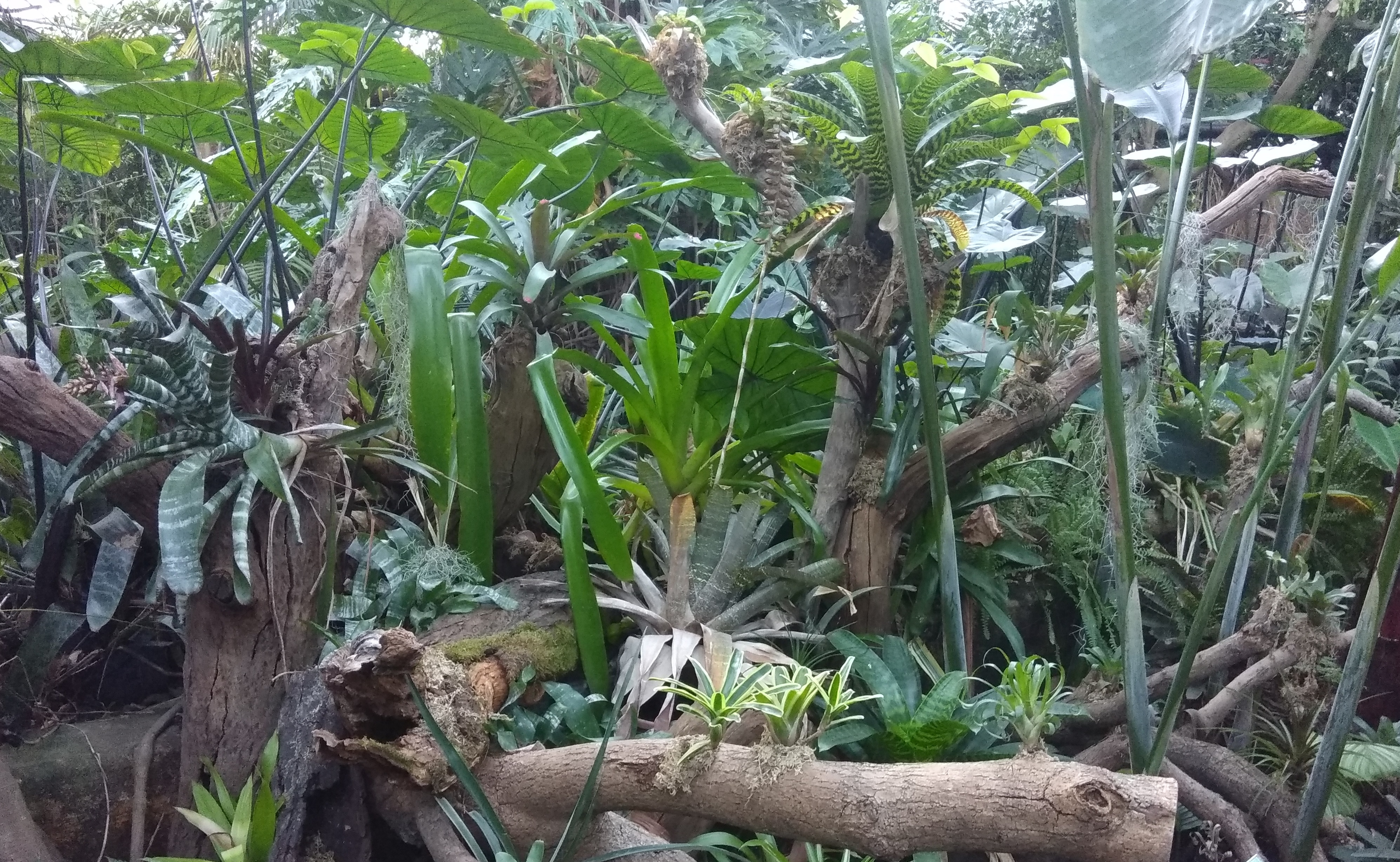
Bromeliad exhibit

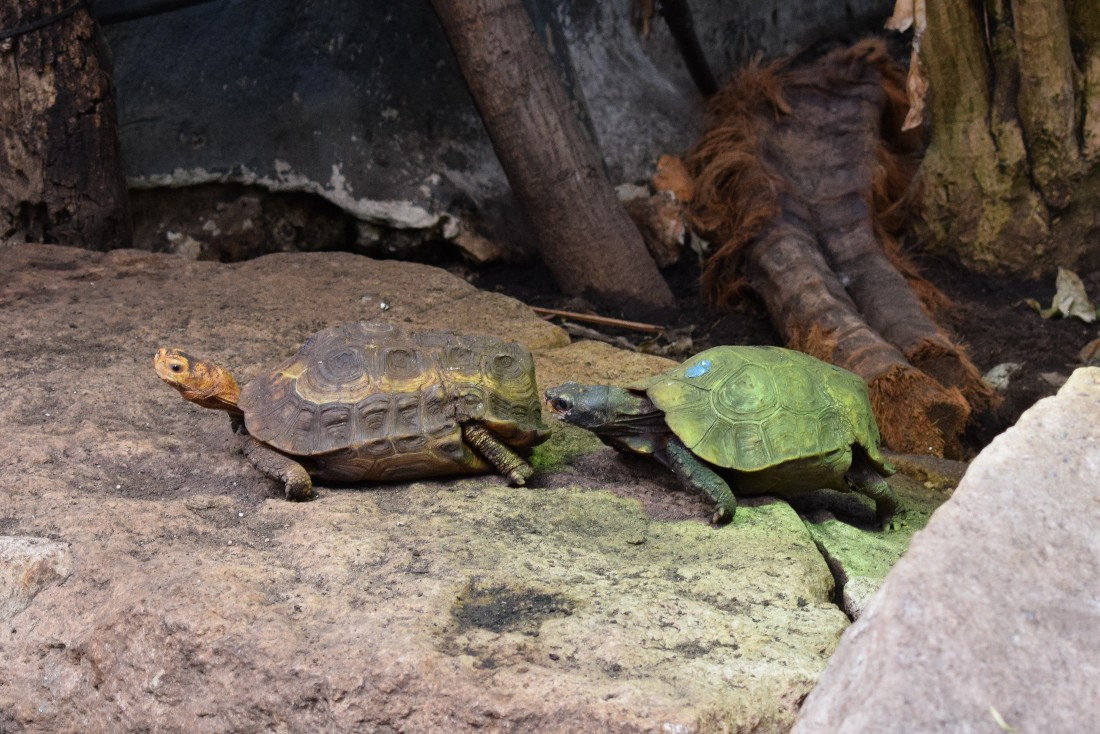
Home's Hinge-Back Tortoise

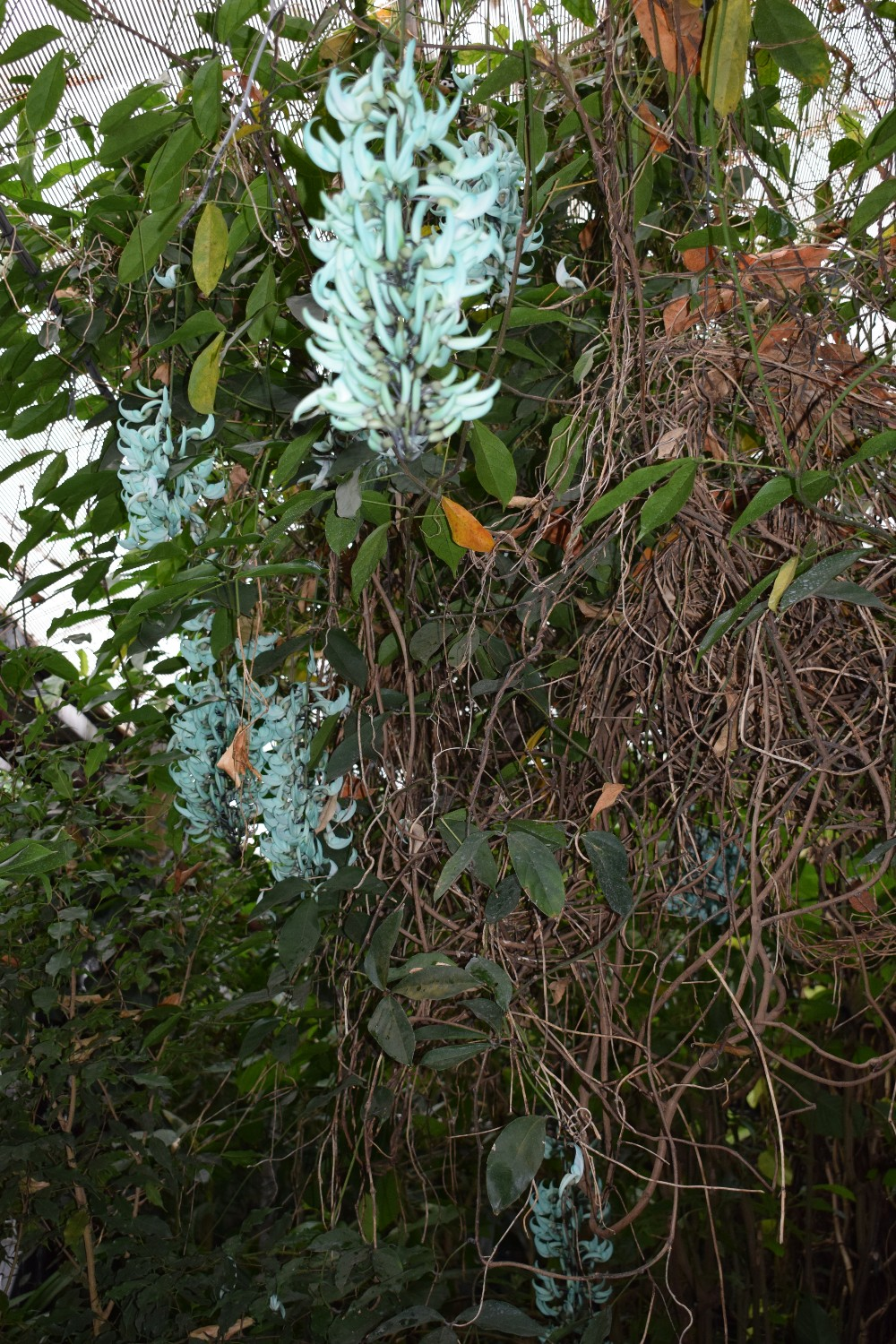
Jade Vine

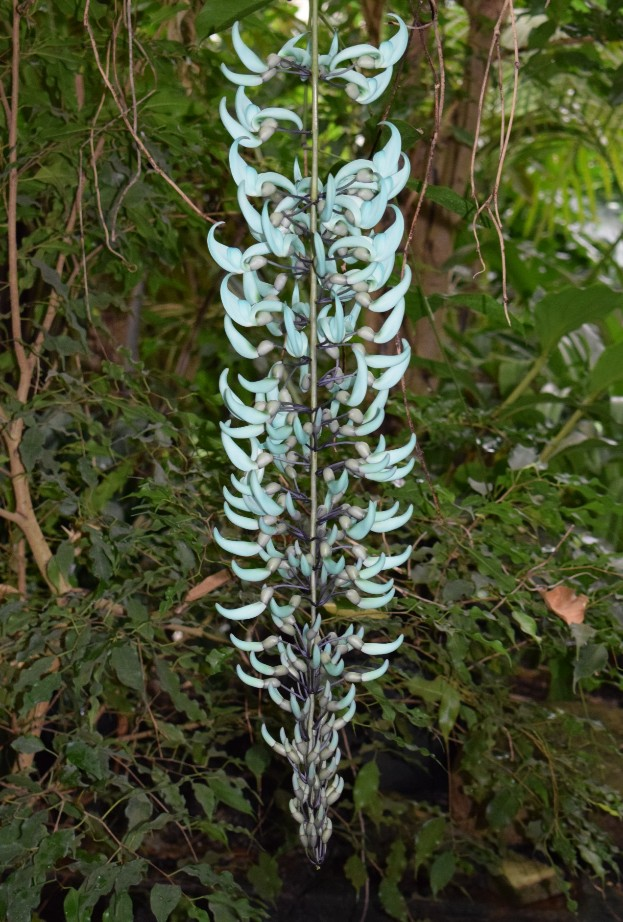
Jade Vine

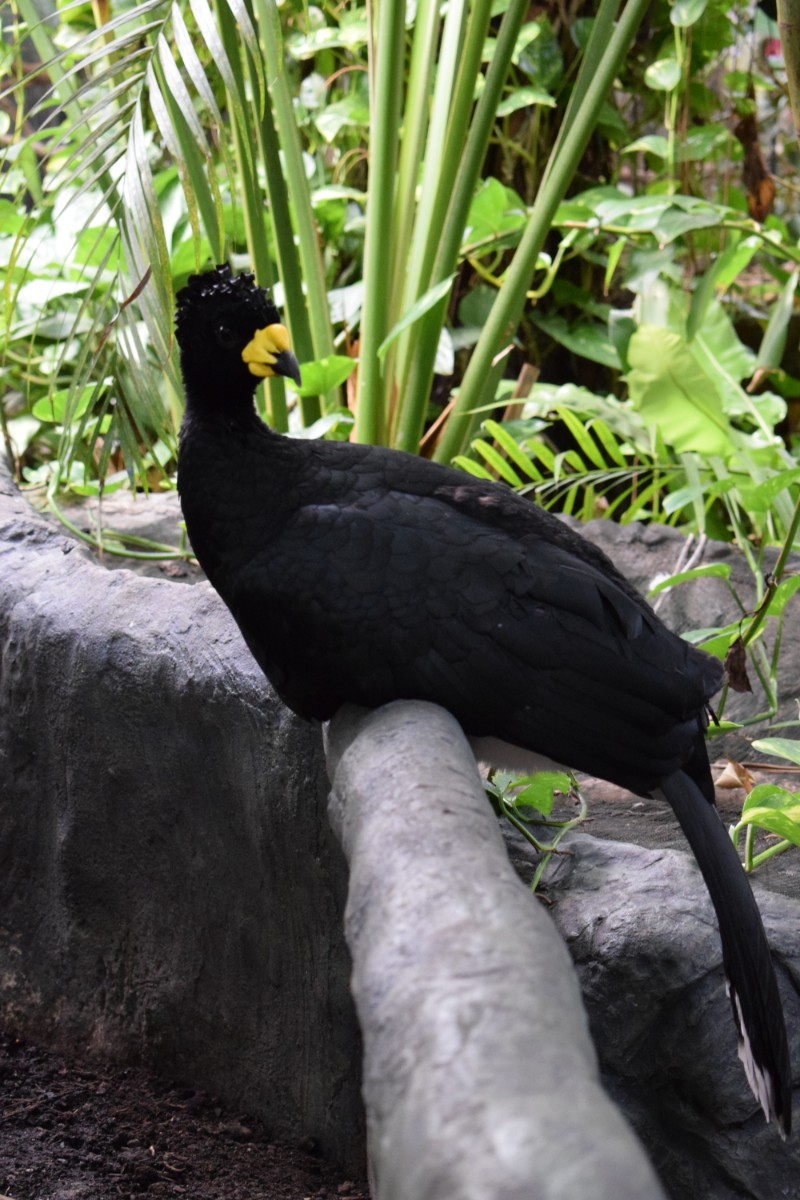
Yellow-knobbed Curassow

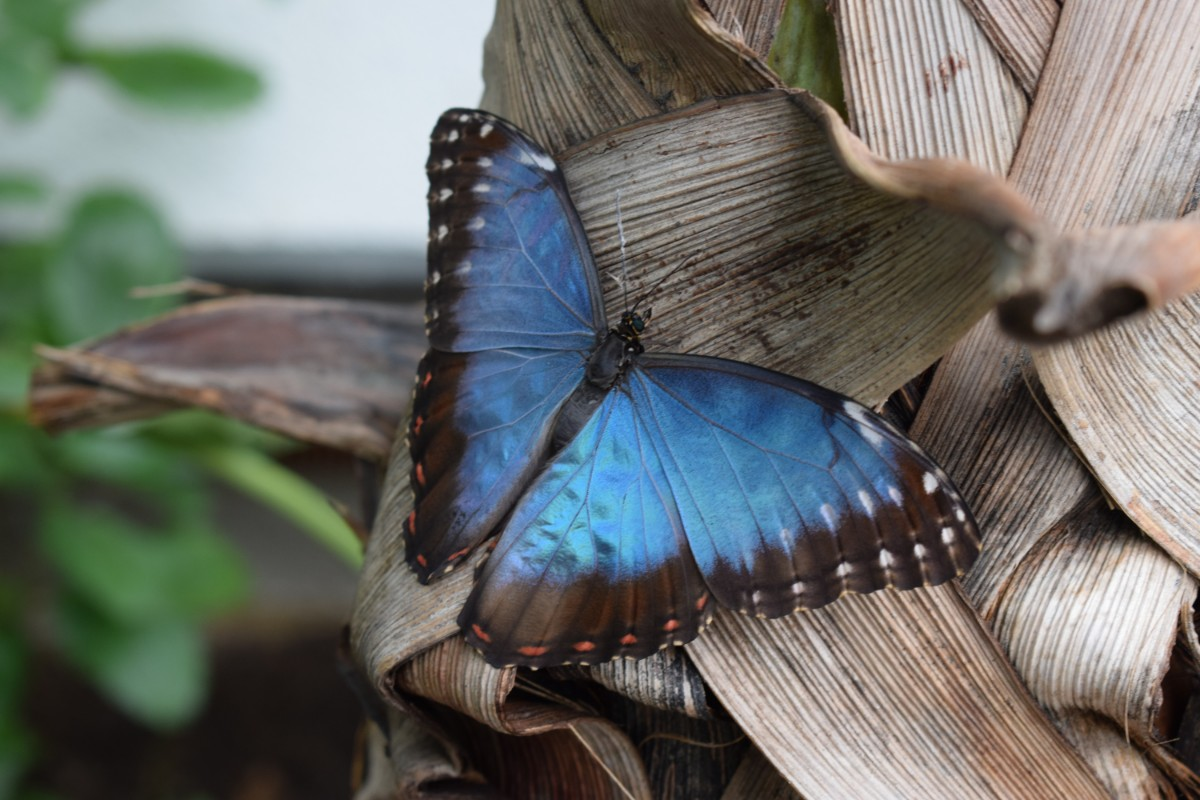
Blue Morpho

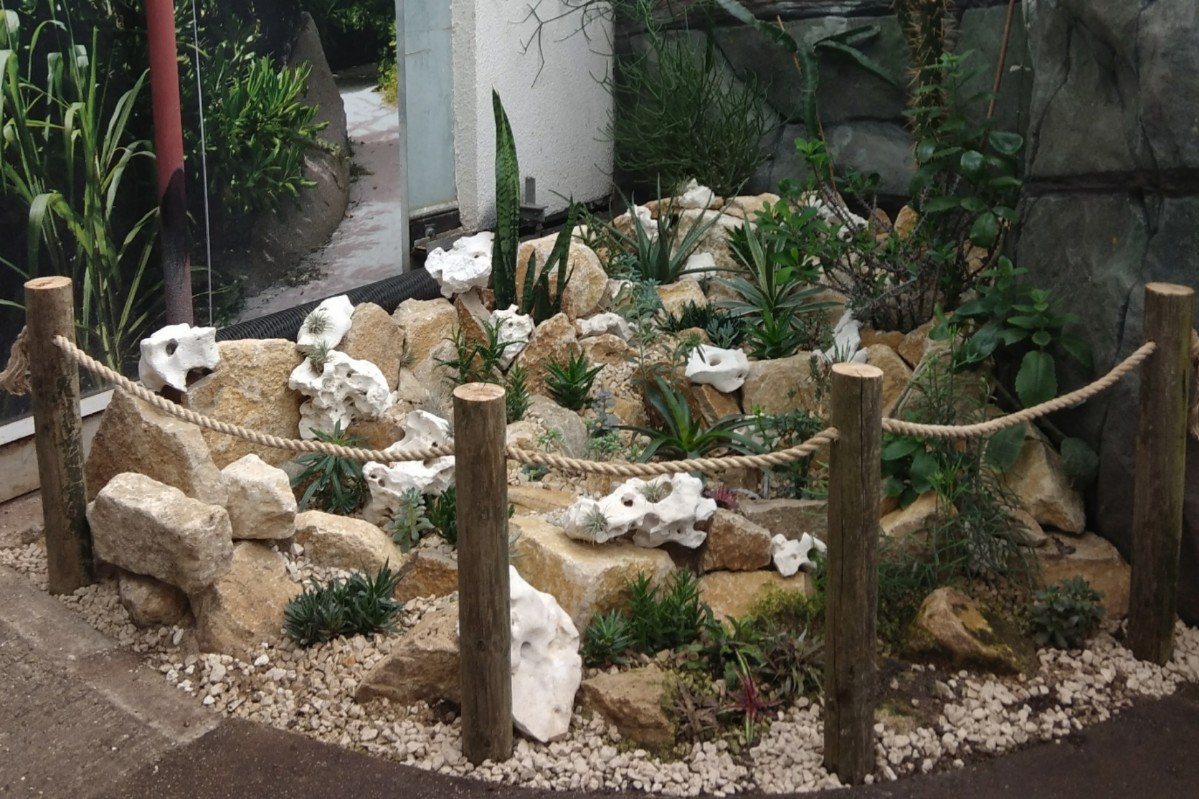
succulents in Small Islands
