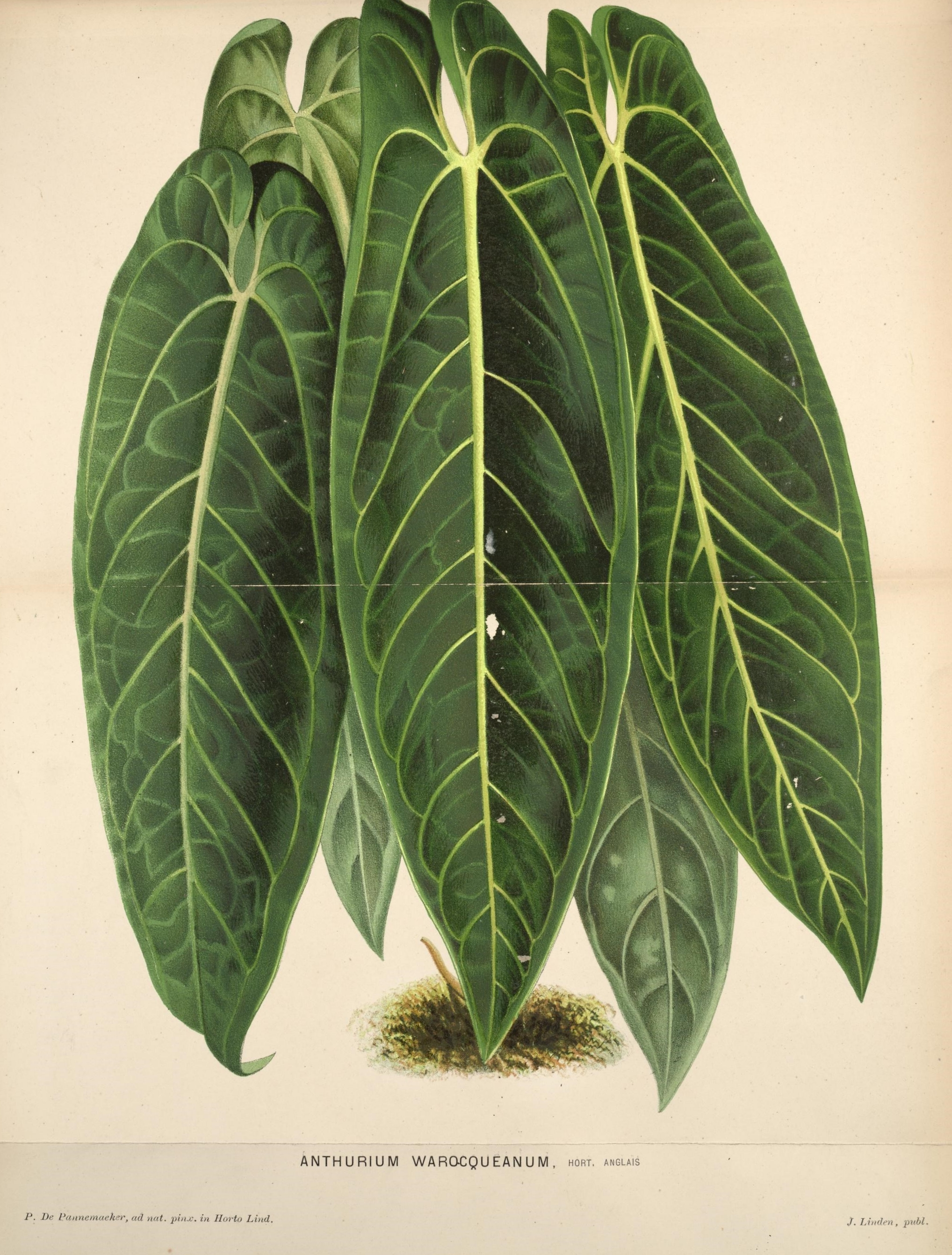
- 1880 illustration from L'Illustration horticole

Conservation status
- Least Concern (IUCN 3.1)

Scientific classification
- Kingdom: Plantae
- Clade: Tracheophytes
- Clade: Angiosperms
- Clade: Monocots
- Order: Alismatales
- Family: Araceae
- Genus: Anthurium
- Species: A. warocqueanum

Binomial name
- Anthurium warocqueanum T.Moore

= Anthurium warocqueanum =

Species of flowering plant

Anthurium warocqueanum is a species of flowering plant in the family Araceae. It is sometimes referred to by the common name Queen Anthurium. It is endemic to Colombia. It grows in more temperate climates, as a greenhouse specimen, or houseplant for its ornamental foliage.

== Description ==
Anthurium warocqueanum is a member species within Cardiolonchium—the so-called "velvet-leaved" Anthuriums, as they have a covering of tiny, flattened short "hairs" with a texture similar to that of velvet. Fellow velvet-leaf species include some of the most popular and famous plants today, such as A. crystallinum, A. regale, and A. magnificum. Queen Anthuriums grow as epiphytic creepers in the rainforests of Colombia, between 400–1,200 metres (1,300–3,900 ft) in elevation. The leaves range from light-green to very dark greenish-black, and can mature to 3–4 feet (0.9–1.2 m) long and 15 inches (38 cm) wide. It has a green spathe and spadix, and produces red berries.

== History and horticulture ==
Named for the Belgian industrialist and horticulturalist Arthur Warocqué (1835–1880), the queen Anthurium was first collected from Colombia in 1874 by Gustav Wallis (along with Anthurium veitchii) during his time working for Veitch Nurseries. Long sought after for its foliage, Anthurium warocqueanum is well known for being difficult to care for, requiring high humidity, indirect light, and well-draining soil.
