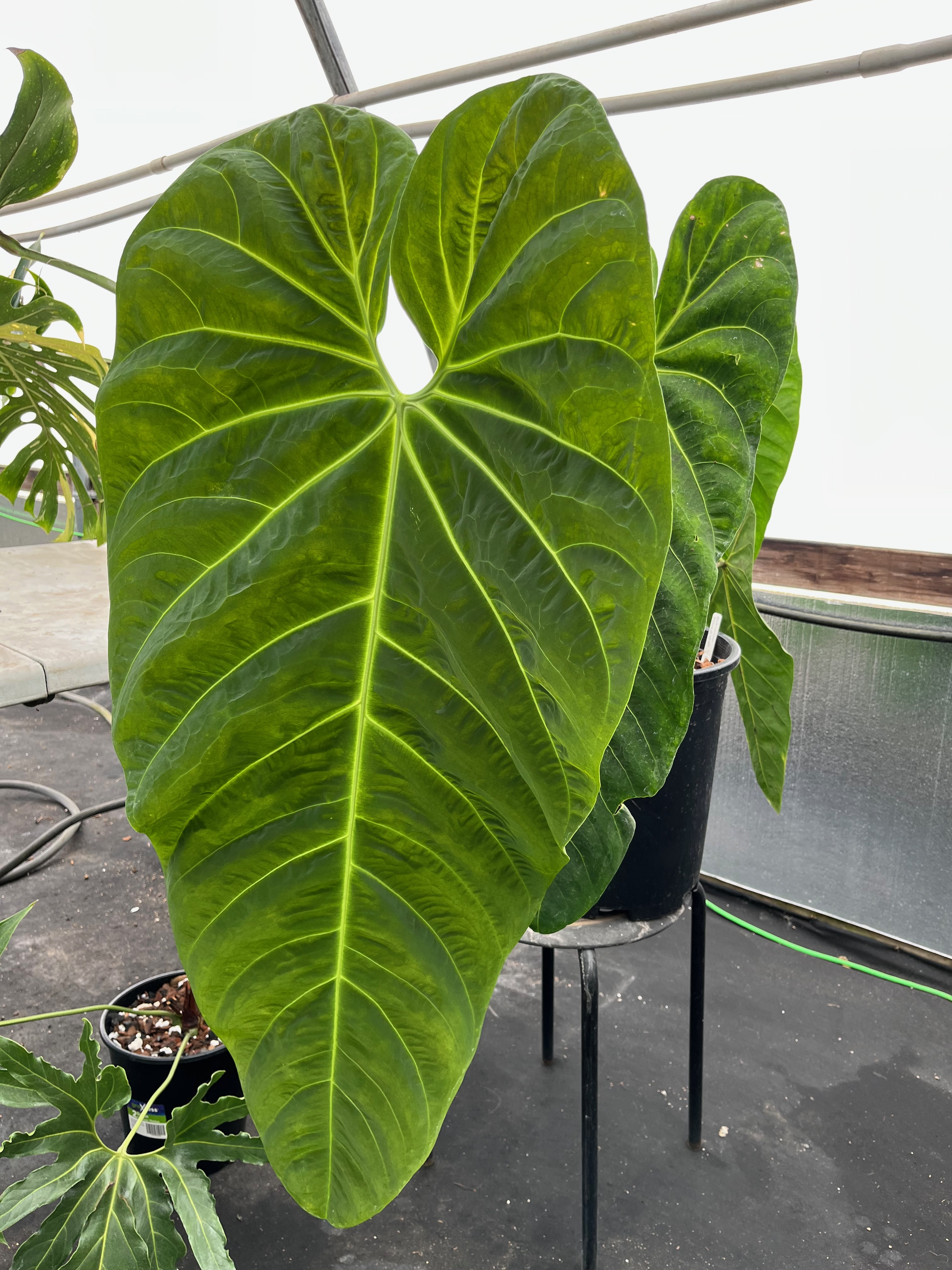

Scientific classification
- Kingdom: Plantae
- Clade: Tracheophytes
- Clade: Angiosperms
- Clade: Monocots
- Order: Alismatales
- Family: Araceae
- Genus: Anthurium
- Species: A. marmoratum

Binomial name
- Anthurium marmoratum Sodiro

= Anthurium marmoratum =

Species of plant

Anthurium marmoratum is a species of plant in the genus Anthurium native to western Colombia and Ecuador. It is a member of the section Cardiolonchium, or the velvet-leaved Anthuriums, along with A. papillilaminum, A. regale, A. crystallinum, and others. It is one of many species used by curanderos in South America to treat snakebite.
