= Hoya angustifolia =

Hoya angustifolia can refer to:

- Hoya angustifolia Elmer, a synonym of Hoya kentiana C.M.Burton
- Hoya angustifolia Traill, a synonym of Hoya verticillata (Vahl) G.Don var. verticillata
