= Edema (plants) =

Edema, a condition in plants

Edema symptoms in plants

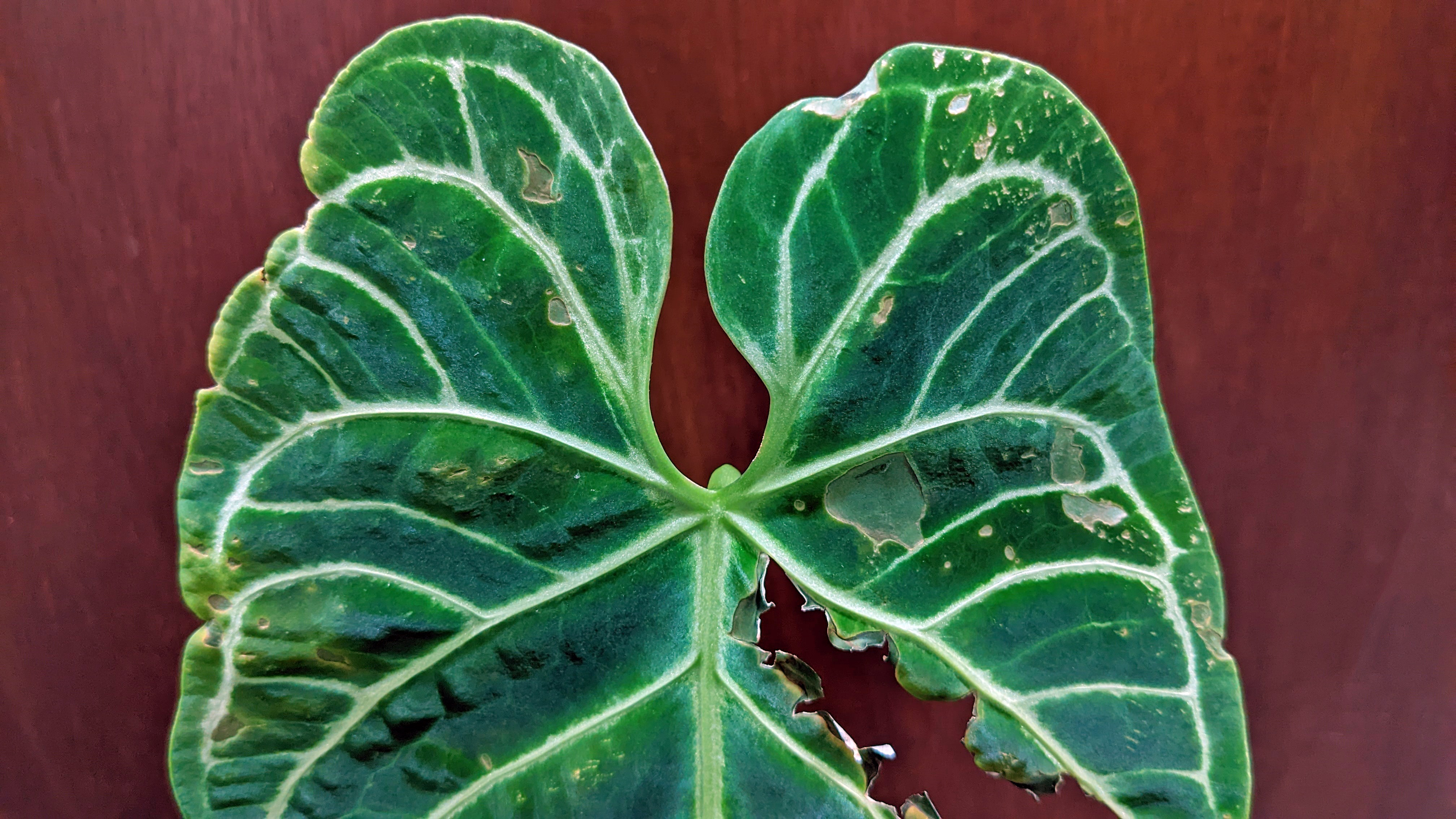
Edema showing indentations on the top side of Anthurium regale leaf

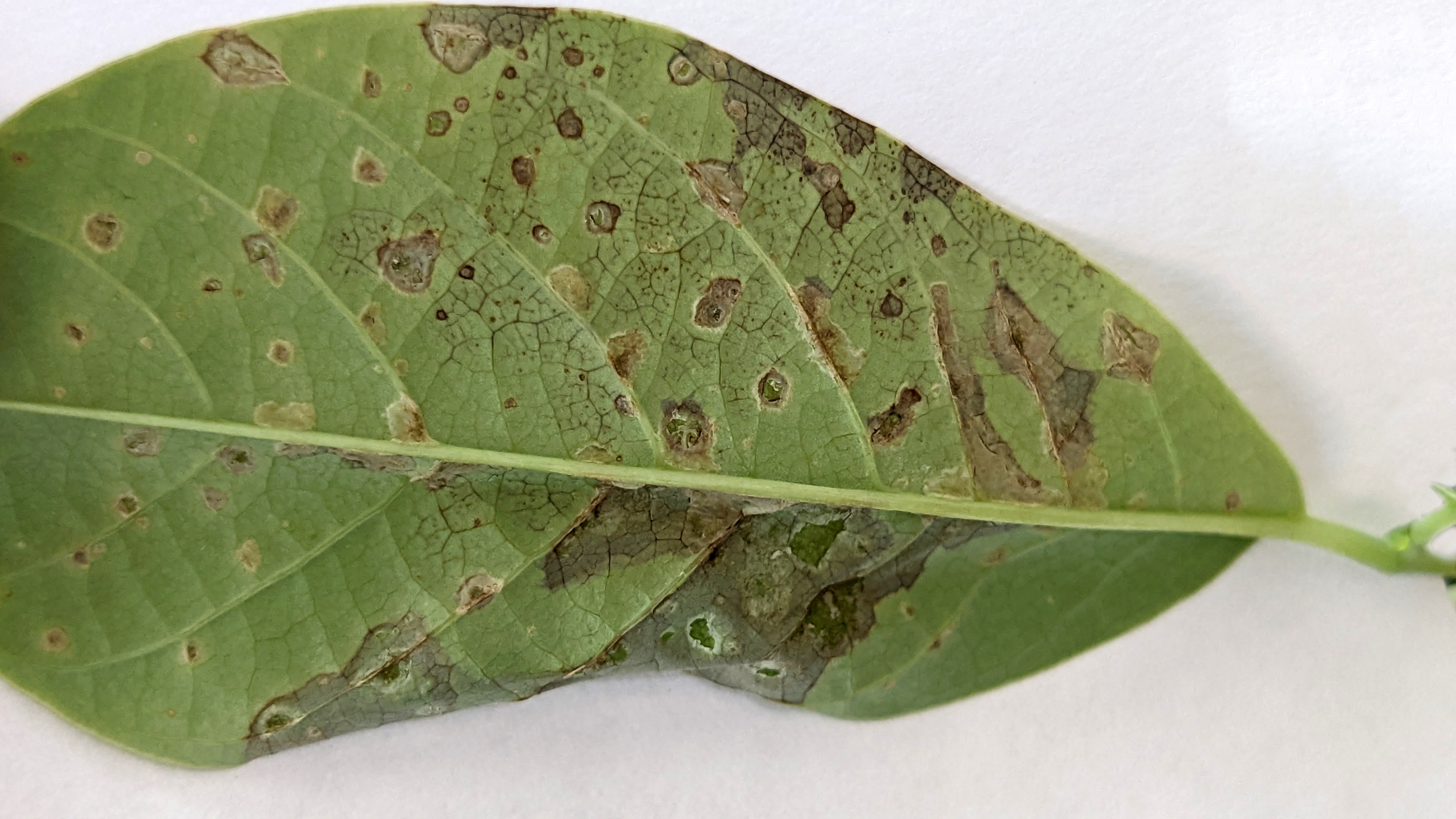
Edema on underside of Annona macroprophyllata leaf

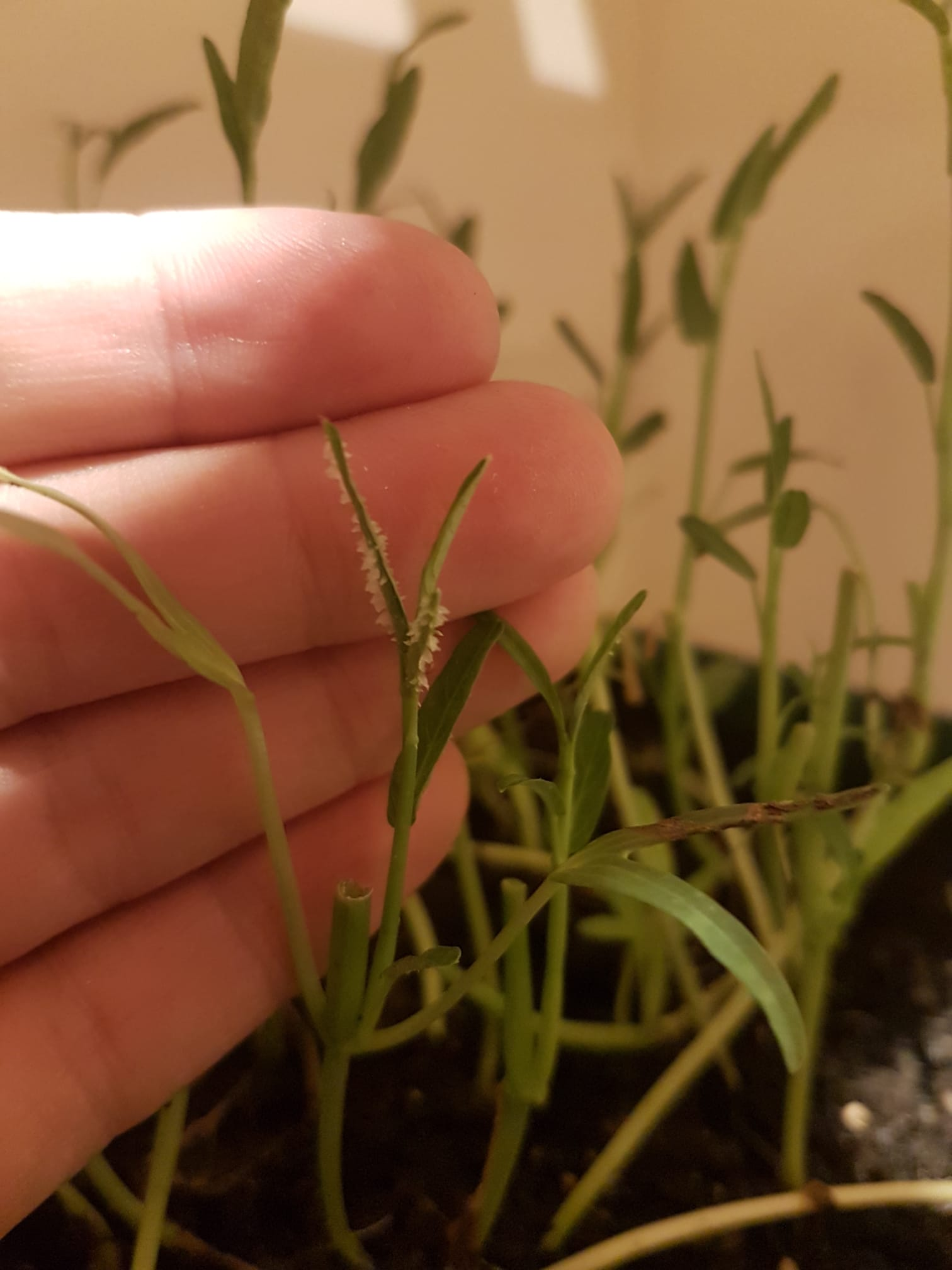
A case of edema occurring on a water spinach (ipomoea aquatica) seedling showing corky growths and white crusty eruptions

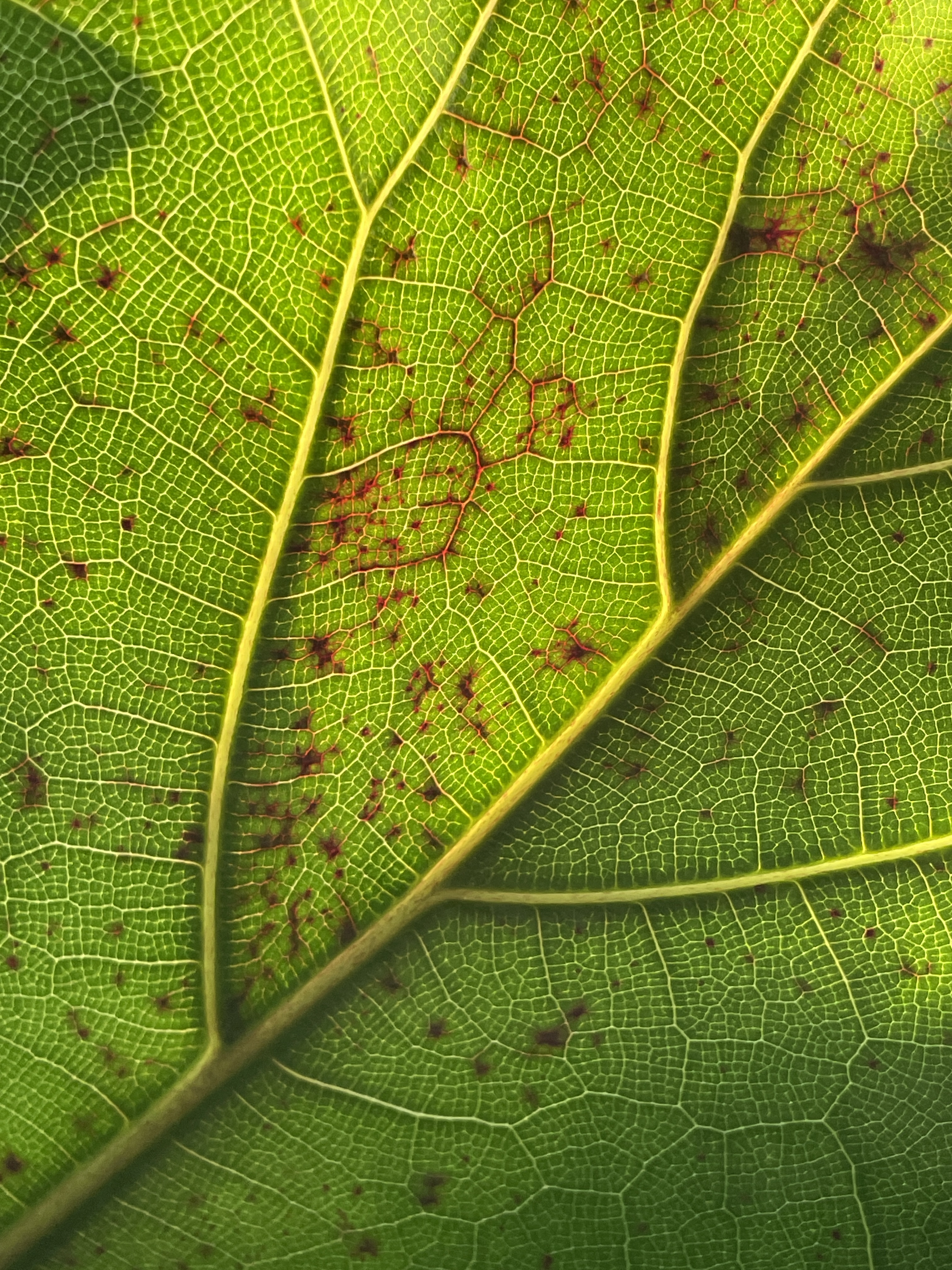
Edema showing as burst red capillaries on a Ficus lyrata leaf

Edema (also spelled oedema, and named from the analogous disorder in humans and other animals) is a disorder in plants caused by the build-up of water in plant tissues faster than the leaves can transpire. The excess fluid bursts the cell membranes, which can appear as blistery growths, red spots, or small white 'crystals'.

== Symptoms ==
Edema causes the appearance of growths, mainly on the underside of leaves, and can also cause indentations on the top side of leaves. The growths can take a different appearance depending on the plant species, but can often take the form of needle like hairs, blisters, corky growths and white crusty eruptions. Susceptibility to edema varies by plant species but almost any broad-leaved plant can be affected. In severely affected plants the growths can also appear on the stems and cause leaves to turn yellow and drop off, leaves can also become distorted. If the conditions causing edema are prolonged then the plant can become spindly and have stunted growth.

Edema can often be confused with a variety of other plant conditions, such as powdery mildew or other mould, pests, viruses or nutrient crystals.

== Causes ==
- Overwatering
- Excessive humidity
- Warm soil and cool air conditions, particularly when in combination with high humidity and overly moist soil
- Poor air circulation
- Overzealous removal of foliage or shoots
- Occasionally, a reaction to chemicals
- Improper nutrient levels, particularly low potassium and calcium

== Treatment ==
A number of changes to the growing environment can all contribute to the improvement of edema symptoms. These include:

- Improvement of air circulation
- Reduction of air temperature
- Reduction of humidity
- Taking care to not wet the leaves when watering
- Reduce watering if soil is water-logged, while also taking care not to under-water
- Using a well drained growing medium
- Addition of nutrients including potassium nitrate and calcium
- Increasing light intensity
- Spacing out plants to reduce overcrowding

== Prognosis ==
Minor cases are unlikely to significantly harm the plant. If adequately treated by improving conditions, new growth will not be affected, however the growths that occurred on leaves during the episode of edema will remain present indefinitely.

Severe cases can cause stunted growth, a spindly appearance, and yellow leaves which can eventually fall off of the plant.

The disorder is not infectious and if edema is the only problem, then the plants are safe to handle and the parts of the plant which would usually be edible will remain safe to eat. However, care should be taken to ensure that other problems, such as mould or pests have not been mistaken for edema.
