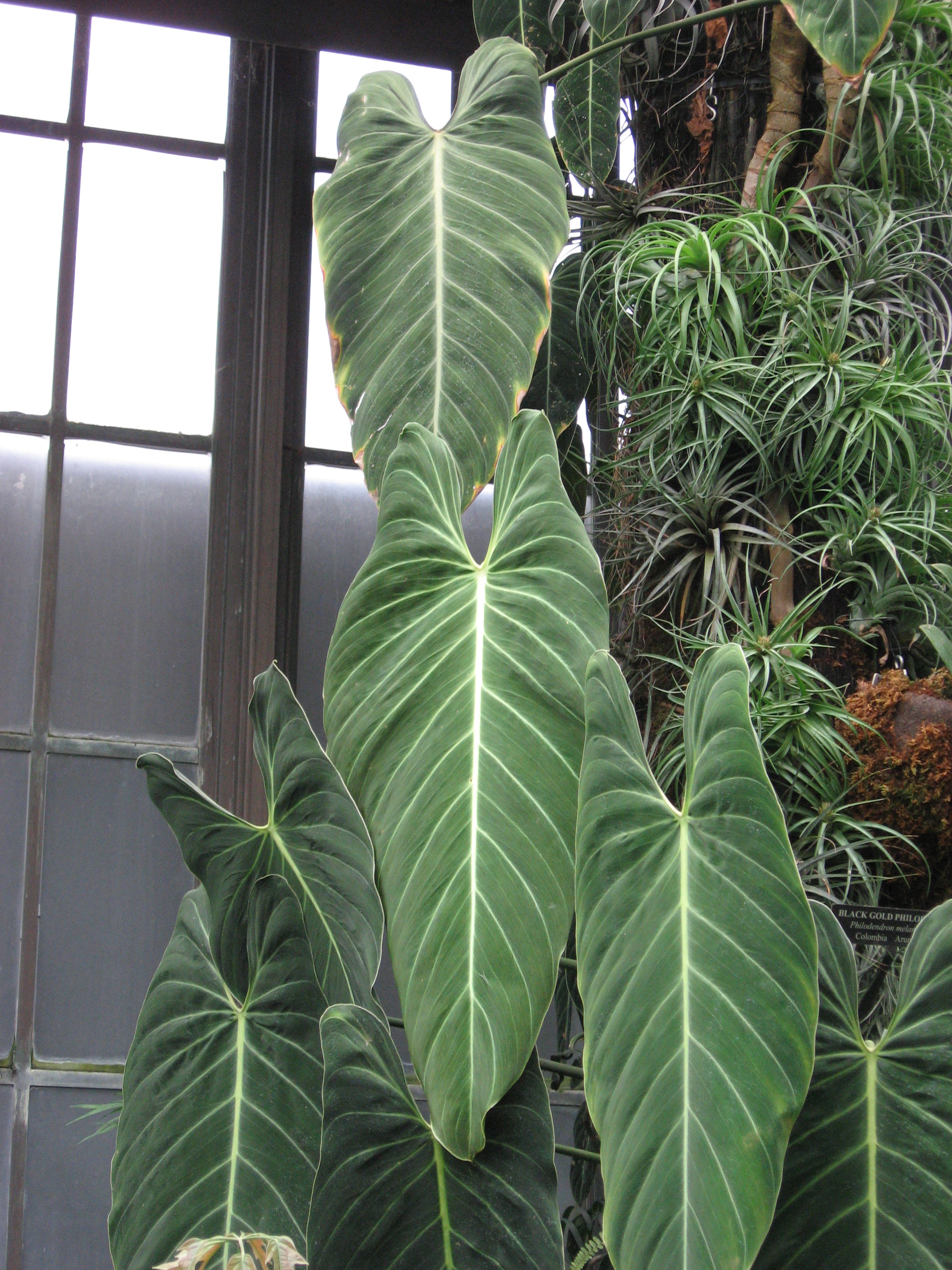

Scientific classification
- Kingdom: Plantae
- Clade: Tracheophytes
- Clade: Angiosperms
- Clade: Monocots
- Order: Alismatales
- Family: Araceae
- Genus: Philodendron
- Species: P. melanochrysum

Binomial name
- Philodendron melanochrysum Linden & André

Synonyms
- Philodendron andreanum Devansaye

= Philodendron melanochrysum =

Species of plant

Philodendron melanochrysum is a species of climbing aroid in the family Araceae. It is endemic to Colombia, growing at approximately 500m above sea level in the provinces of Chocó and Antioquia, and widely cultivated elsewhere as an ornamental houseplant.

The name suffix "melanochrysum" means "black gold," and refers to the golden sheen that can be observed on the dark leaves of the mature plant when they are in direct sunlight. It has been in cultivation outside of South America since 1886, exhibited to Europeans via Veitch Nurseries by Messrs Veitch & Son under the synonym Philodendron andreanum as follows:

A striking Aroid, first discovered by M. Andre, of Paris, and subsequently introduced by us direct from New Granada; it is by far the finest species of Philodendron for decorative purposes ever brought under cultivation. Its stately foliage when fully developed may be compared, for size and effectiveness, with that of Anthurium veitchii and Anthurium warocqueanum.

The cordiform-lanceolate leaves are deflected vertically from a robust erect footstalk, and attain a length of four to five feet. When first expanded on the young plant they are of a decided scarlet tinge shaded with brown, when a little older they become a bronzy red-brown before finally changing to the normal bright velvety green of the mature leaves. Through all these changes the colors are relieved and enhanced by the white midrib and nerves that branch from it.

We received the award of a First Class Certificate for this plant at the Royal Horticultural Society's Show at Liverpool, in June, 1886, under the name of Philodendron grandidens, where it formed one of the principal attractions of the group of plants exhibited by us. We also received a Certificate of Merit for it from the Royal Botanic Society two years previous under the same name.

The species has heart-shaped leaves that are typically 25 cm long, but can grow much longer in ideal conditions. Emerging leaves have a copper-gold velvety sheen, but when established become blackish-green with pale green veins. When growing them as a houseplant, placing them on a moss pole and maintaining high humidity ensures ideal, large leaf development. Philodendron melanochrysum may be susceptible to a variety of pests, in particular spider mites.

== See also ==
- List of Philodendron species
