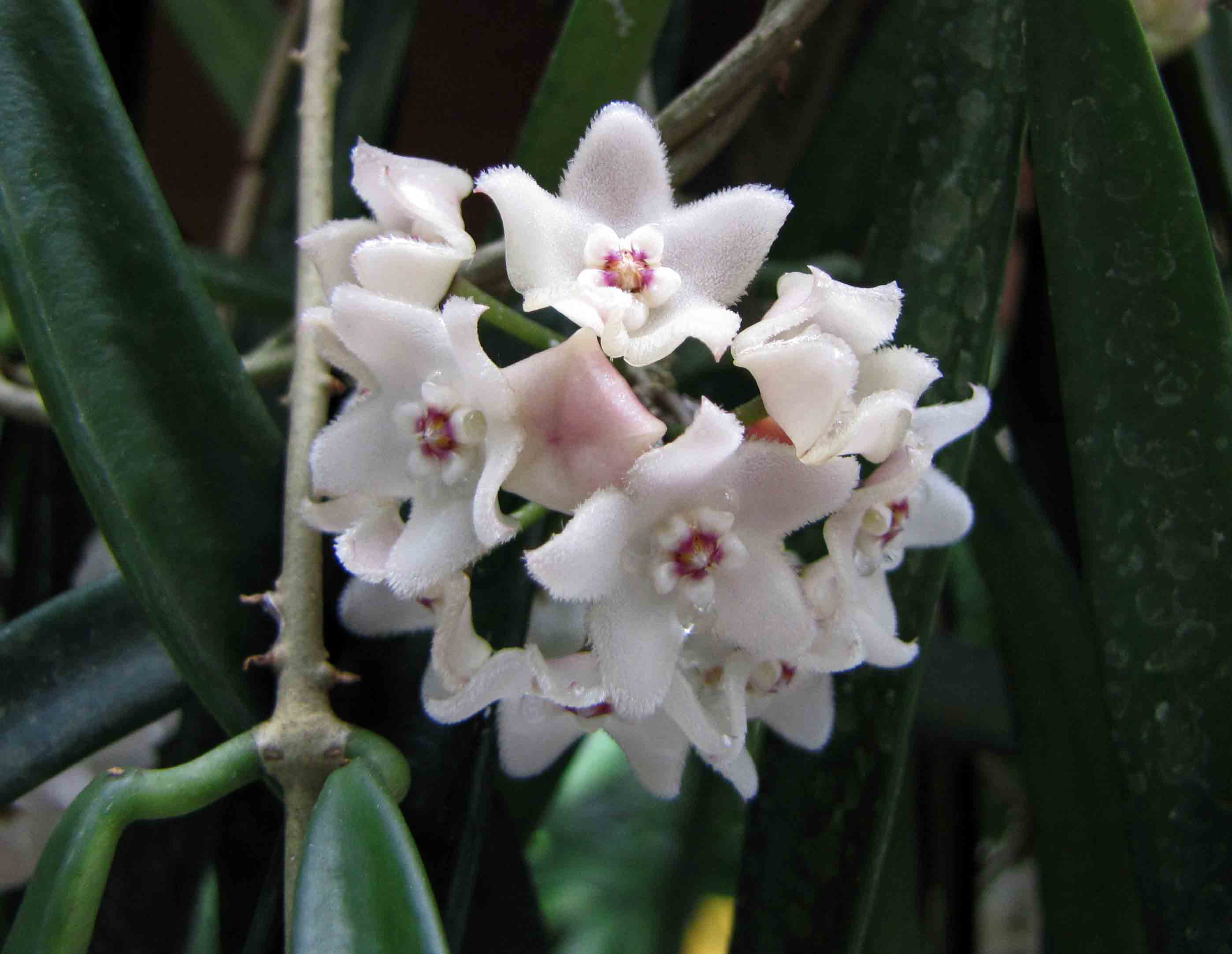
- Flowers of Hoya shepherdii at the Warsaw University Botanic Garden

Scientific classification
- Kingdom: Plantae
- Clade: Tracheophytes
- Clade: Angiosperms
- Clade: Eudicots
- Clade: Asterids
- Order: Gentianales
- Family: Apocynaceae
- Genus: Hoya
- Species: H. shepherdii

Binomial name
- Hoya shepherdii Govaerts

= Hoya shepherdii =

Species of plant

Hoya shepherdii is a species of flowering plant in the genus Hoya native to the eastern Himalayas and Assam. It is known for its long, slender foliage that superficially resembles a green bean, somewhat similar to Hoya kentiana and Hoya wayetii.

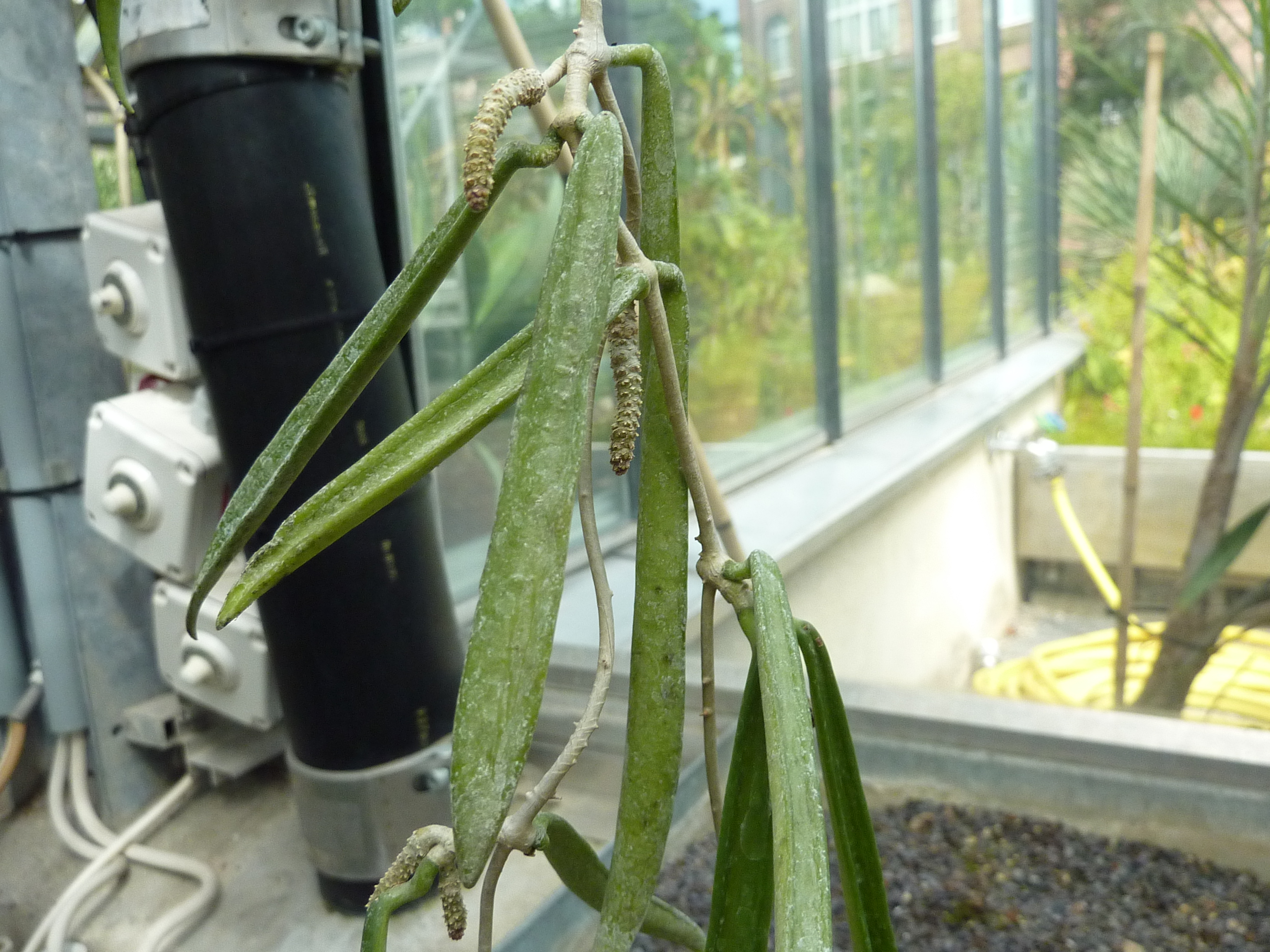
Foliage
