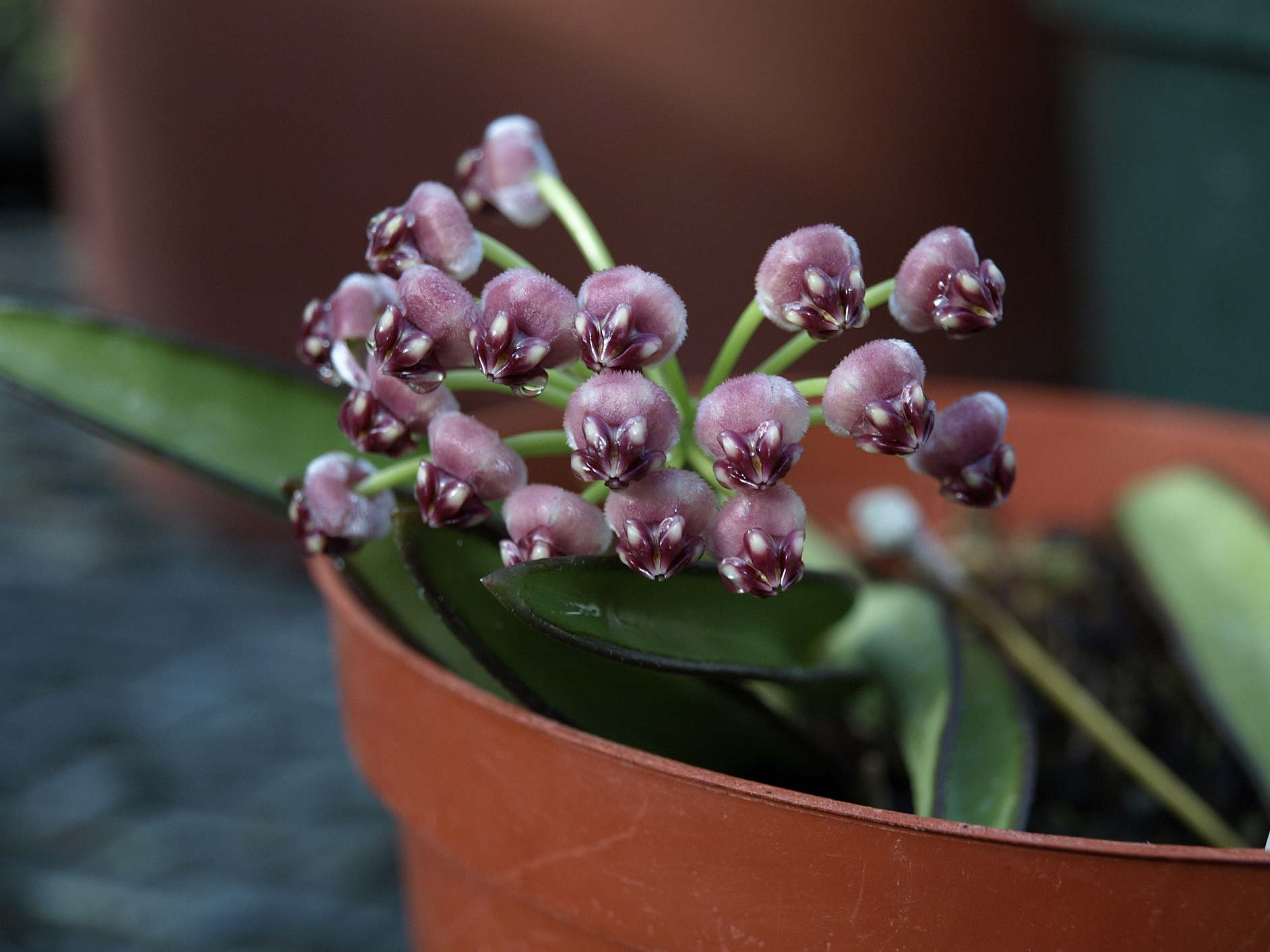
- Hoya wayteii flowers, grown in the greenhouse at Florida International University

Scientific classification
- Kingdom: Plantae
- Clade: Tracheophytes
- Clade: Angiosperms
- Clade: Eudicots
- Clade: Asterids
- Order: Gentianales
- Family: Apocynaceae
- Genus: Hoya
- Species: H. wayetii

Binomial name
- Hoya wayetii Kloppenb.

= Hoya wayetii =

Species of plant

Hoya wayetii is a species of flowering plant in the genus Hoya native to the Philippines.

== Description ==
Sometimes confused with Hoya kentiana or Hoya shepherdii, it has long, slender foliage that often has a red margin when exposed to sufficient sun. Like many others in its genus, it has a vining growth habit.
