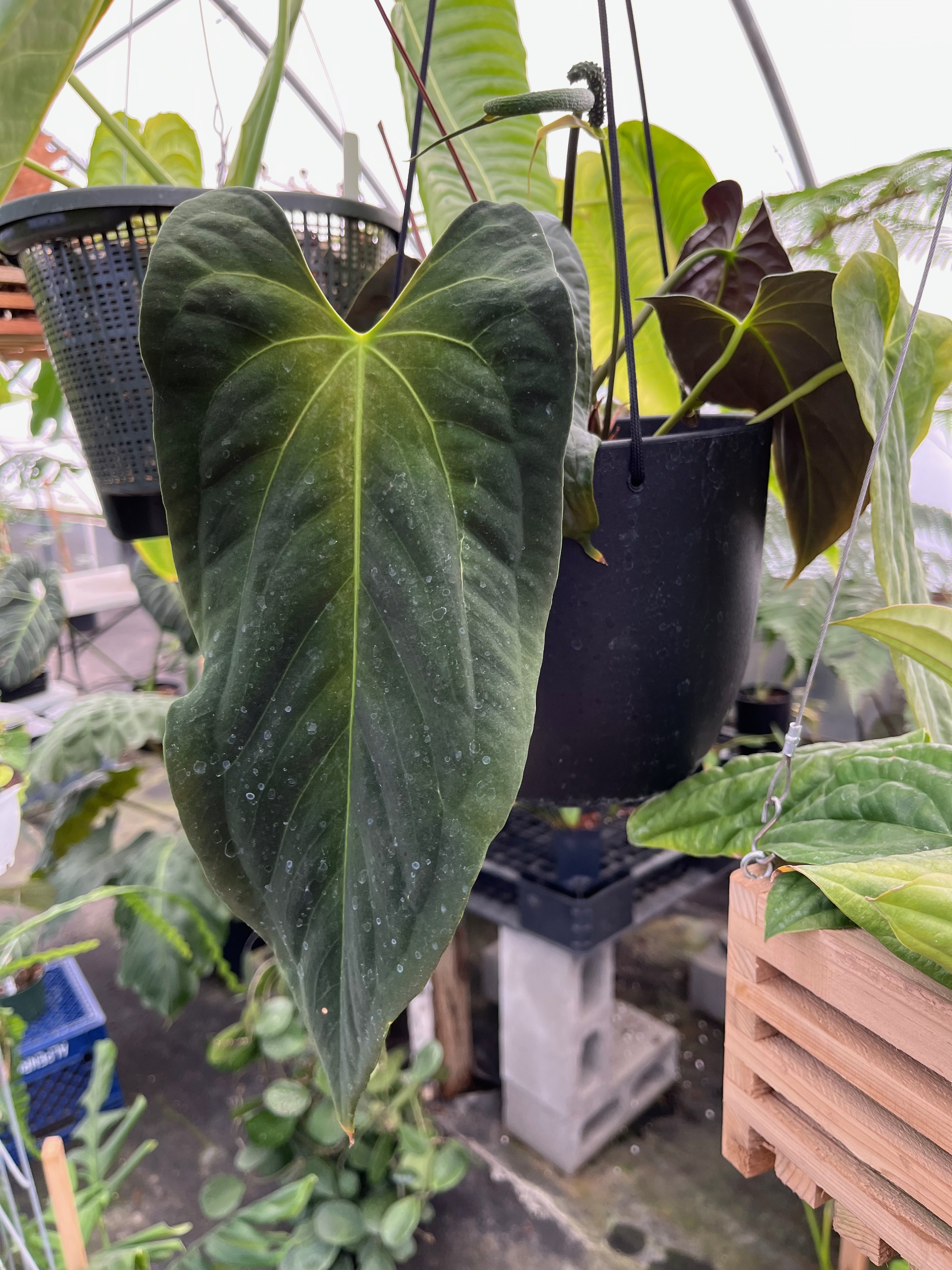
- A. papillilaminum being grown in a greenhouse

Scientific classification
- Kingdom: Plantae
- Clade: Tracheophytes
- Clade: Angiosperms
- Clade: Monocots
- Order: Alismatales
- Family: Araceae
- Genus: Anthurium
- Species: A. papillilaminum

Binomial name
- Anthurium papillilaminum Croat

= Anthurium papillilaminum =

Species of plant

Anthurium papillilaminum is a species of plant in the genus Anthurium native to Panama. A. papillilaminum grows terrestrially and has very dark green cordate leaves on short stems. Its native range is very limited, with the species endemic to only the coasts of Colón Province and Darién Province up to 100 meters (330 ft) above sea level. A member of the section Cardiolonchium, it is closely related to other velvet-leaved Anthuriums, though it does not have silver veins on the leaves like Anthurium crystallinum.

== History ==
A. papillilaminum was described by Thomas Croat in his A revision of the genus Anthurium (Araceae) of Mexico and Central America, published in 1986. The holotype is accessioned in the herbarium of the Missouri Botanical Garden.
