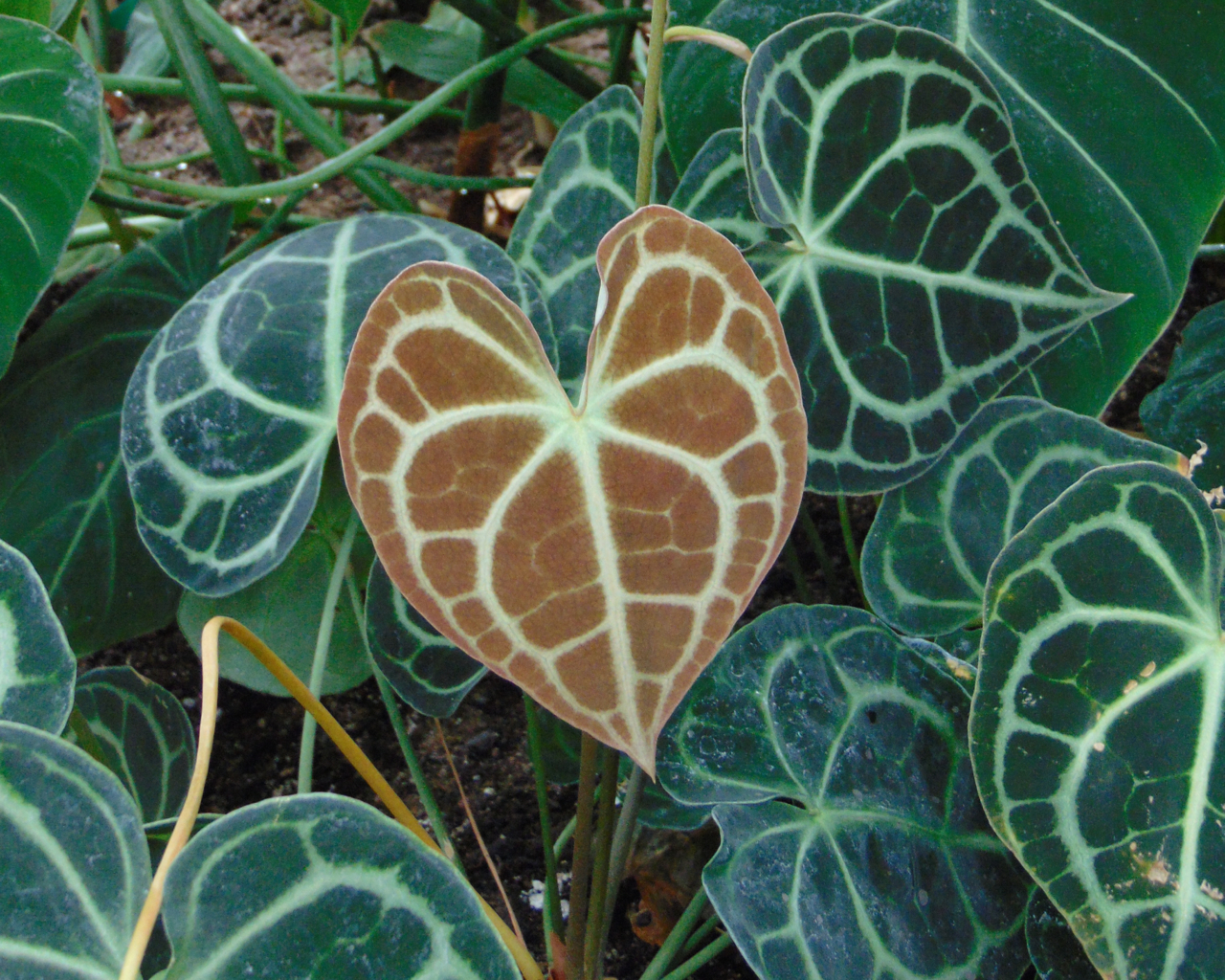

Scientific classification
- Kingdom: Plantae
- Clade: Tracheophytes
- Clade: Angiosperms
- Clade: Monocots
- Order: Alismatales
- Family: Araceae
- Genus: Anthurium
- Species: A. clarinervium

Binomial name
- Anthurium clarinervium Matuda

= Anthurium clarinervium =

Species of flowering plant

Anthurium clarinervium is a species of flowering plant in the family Araceae native to Chiapas, Mexico. The Anthurium genus is known to contain approximately 1,000 species, resulting in one of the most diverse Central American tropical plant genera.

== Description ==
A. clarinervium is a deep forest green colored plant with a velvety leaf surface, with reticulate venation which is an uncommon venation pattern for a monocot. The veins vary between ivory and light green in color and are usually 1 cm in width. It has ovate, deeply-lobed leaves, resembling a love heart, with whitish veins, atop stems that are 1–2 cm thick. It grows naturally as an epiphyte. A. clarinervium produces orange berries containing numerous seeds and reproduces via sexual reproduction. This species has been unofficially placed in the category of Esqueleto herbs (Esqueleto is Spanish for skeleton), as the veins of the leaves resemble a ribcage. It is similar in appearance to and may be confused with Anthurium crystallinum.

== Distribution ==
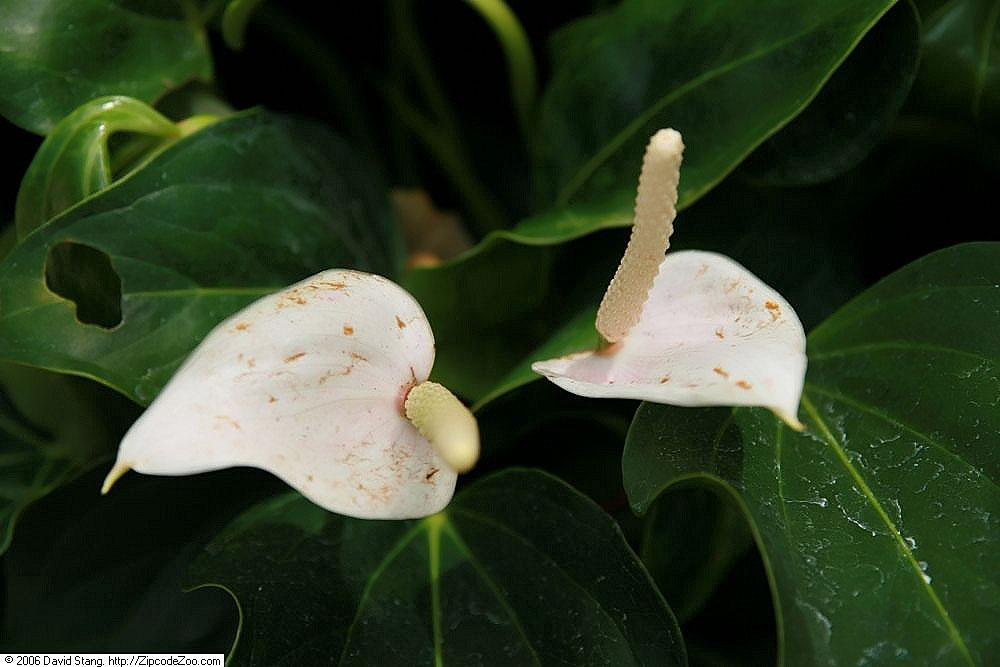
Anthurium clarinervium spadix

Anthurium clarinervium tends to grow in wet disturbed forests or elevated cloudy environments. It is found naturally in Mexico. Anthurium clarinervium is an aroid perennial that flourishes in shaded regions of Mexico’s limestone ledges.

== History ==
A. clarinervium was first discovered in the 1950s in a small region of southern Mexico, growing at an elevation of 2,500–3,800 feet (760–1,160 m) It was found in a karstic rainforest region in soil containing limestone. This type of Anthurium is found thriving off other plant's nutrients through water absorption from other plants. A. clarinervium also absorbs different nutrients from leaves and debris from the rain.

== Cultivation ==
Although it grows naturally in tropical climates, many people find it to have attractive qualities, resulting in a high demand as a house plant. This plant exists in both a horticultural environment and in a tropical, natural environment. People enjoy the look of this species because it can bloom for several months and because of its unique foliage. Anthuriums can be challenging as houseplants because it is not easy to match the conditions of their natural environment in houses. But because an Anthurium is an epiphyte, they can survive many different habitats that are not similar to their normal humid rainforest environment.

Anthurium clarinervium occurs in Chiapas, Mexico

Bright, indirect sunlight is required for this plant. It prefers temperatures from low 70 °F (21 °C) to low 80 °F (27 °C), and humidity at 50% or higher, optimally 75-85%. The plant do not do well in small amounts of light, and veins can then lose saturation. It also does not do well in direct sunlight, which may cause burns on foliage. Modest fertilization is necessary for this plant to flourish. Aerated and loose soil is desired, with moderate levels of moisture. A. clarinervium will struggle to grow in thick clay soil, with possible root rot. Soil pH between 5.5 and 6.8 is ideal.

== Toxicity ==
Anthurium clarinervium is poisonous to both humans and common pets upon ingestion. Toxic harm results from the presence of calcium oxalate crystals in the leaves which can cause improper mineral absorption and inflammation of the lining of the digestive tract. Ingesting this plant can cause drooling, nausea, trouble swallowing or breathing, diarrhea, and pain in the mouth and throat. Remedies include removing all parts of the plant, and rinsing out mouth with either milk or water. The calcium in the crystals and milk will bind together and reduce pain.

== Diseases ==
The genus Anthurium is susceptible to multiple types of bacterial and fungal diseases.

=== Bacterial diseases ===
- Bacterial blight (Xanthomonas axonopodis pv. dieffenbachiae)- Forms easily visible water-logged lesions along the leaf. Leaves also begin to yellow and necrosis occurs. Bacteria enters via pores or wounds such as rips, tears, or punctures.
- Bacterial wilt (Ralstonia solanacearum)- Typical wilting symptoms are observable with this disease. Plant exhibits leaf yellowing and stem browning. Vascular system allows swift spread of disease. Ooze or slime may leak out of wound of infected plant.

=== Fungal diseases ===
- Rhizoctonia root rot (Rhizoctonia solani) – Stems, typically young ones, become water-logged and droop due to the increased weight. The root system is also attacked.
- Phytophthora/Pythium (Phytophthora nicotianae var. parasitica and Pythium splendens) – Both fungi are considered oomycetes, otherwise known as water molds, and attack the root system. Wilting, chlorosis, and root dieback are all common symptoms.
- Black nose disease (Colletotrichum gloeosporioides) – As the name suggests, the floral spadix forms black spots, which rapidly grow and may result in spadix death.

== Sources ==
- Aroid.org description
