= Hoya bhutanica =

Conservation status
- Endangered (IUCN 3.1)

Scientific classification
- Kingdom: Plantae
- Clade: Embryophytes
- Clade: Tracheophytes
- Clade: Angiosperms
- Clade: Eudicots
- Clade: Asterids
- Order: Gentianales
- Family: Apocynaceae
- Genus: Hoya
- Species: H. bhutanica

Binomial name
- Hoya bhutanica Grierson & D.G.Long

Epiphyte from Bhutan

Hoya bhutanica is a species of epiphytic climbing shrub endemic to Bhutan. It is currently classified as endangered in the IUCN Red List.

== Description ==
It is similar to Hoya parasitica (which is now regarded as included within Hoya verticillata). The leaves are up to 15 cm long, fleshy, elliptic to narrowly so in shape, with acuminate apex. The leaf base is cuneate with three nerves at the base. Flowers are about 2 cm across, with white lobes and a purple centre. It is an extensive glabrous creeper with slender stems to 5 metres.

== Range ==
Hoya bhutanica is currently known only from Bhutan.

== Habitat ==
It is an epiphyte on trees in dense forest. It is mainly found in the wet tropical biome.

== Etymology ==
The species epithet was given from Bhutan, the name of the country where the holotype of this species was found by the southern border with India near Hatisar (Hati Sahar), now called Gelephu. That specimen was found on the 17th of March 1949 at 450 metres altitude.
