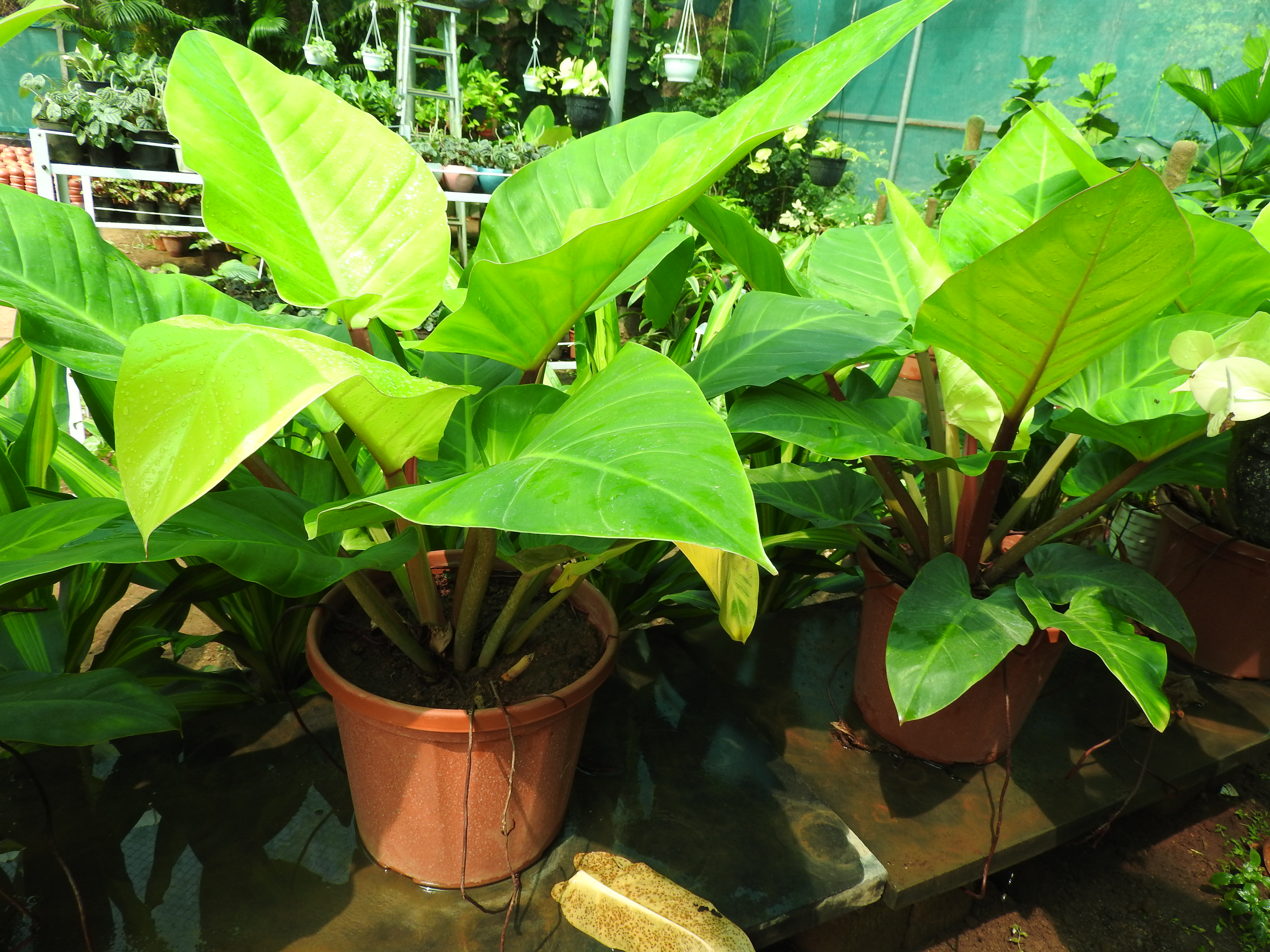
- Potted specimens
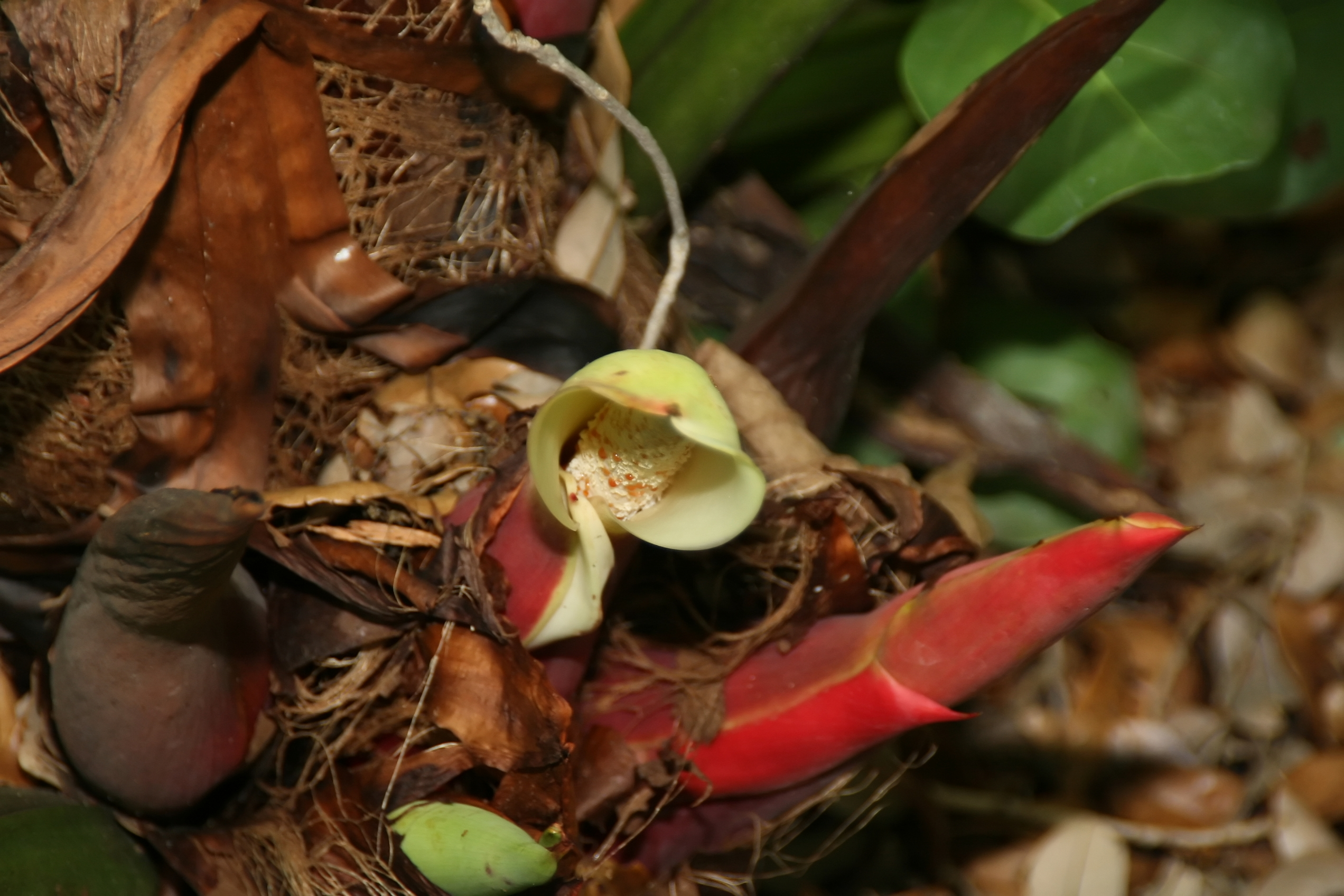
- Flowers emerge at base

Scientific classification
- Kingdom: Plantae
- Clade: Tracheophytes
- Clade: Angiosperms
- Clade: Monocots
- Order: Alismatales
- Family: Araceae
- Genus: Philodendron
- Species: P. melinonii

Binomial name
- Philodendron melinonii Brongn. ex Regel

= Philodendron melinonii =

Species of plant

Philodendron melinonii is a species of flowering plant in the family Araceae, native to wet tropical forests of northern South America. A hemiepiphyte with thermogenic flowers, it is typically found just below the canopy.
