= Hoya nicholsoniae =

Scientific classification
- Kingdom: Plantae
- Clade: Embryophytes
- Clade: Tracheophytes
- Clade: Angiosperms
- Clade: Eudicots
- Clade: Asterids
- Order: Gentianales
- Family: Apocynaceae
- Genus: Hoya
- Species: H. nicholsoniae

Binomial name
- Hoya nicholsoniae F.Muell.

Species of plant

Hoya nicholsoniae is a species of Hoya native to New Caledonia, New Guinea, Queensland, Samoa and the Solomon Islands.

== Taxonomy ==
In Australia, there are specimens known as Hoya pottsii, which Plants of the World Online (POWO) considers to be a synonym of H. verticillata, though POWO does not list Australia as part of the range of H. verticillata. Those Australian plants had been known as Hoya nicholsoniae before being renamed as H. pottsii. Mark Randal considered that the plants identified as Australian H. pottsii should still be regarded as H. nicholsoniae, a species that POWO does accept as native to Queensland, Australia.

== See also ==
- List of Hoya species
