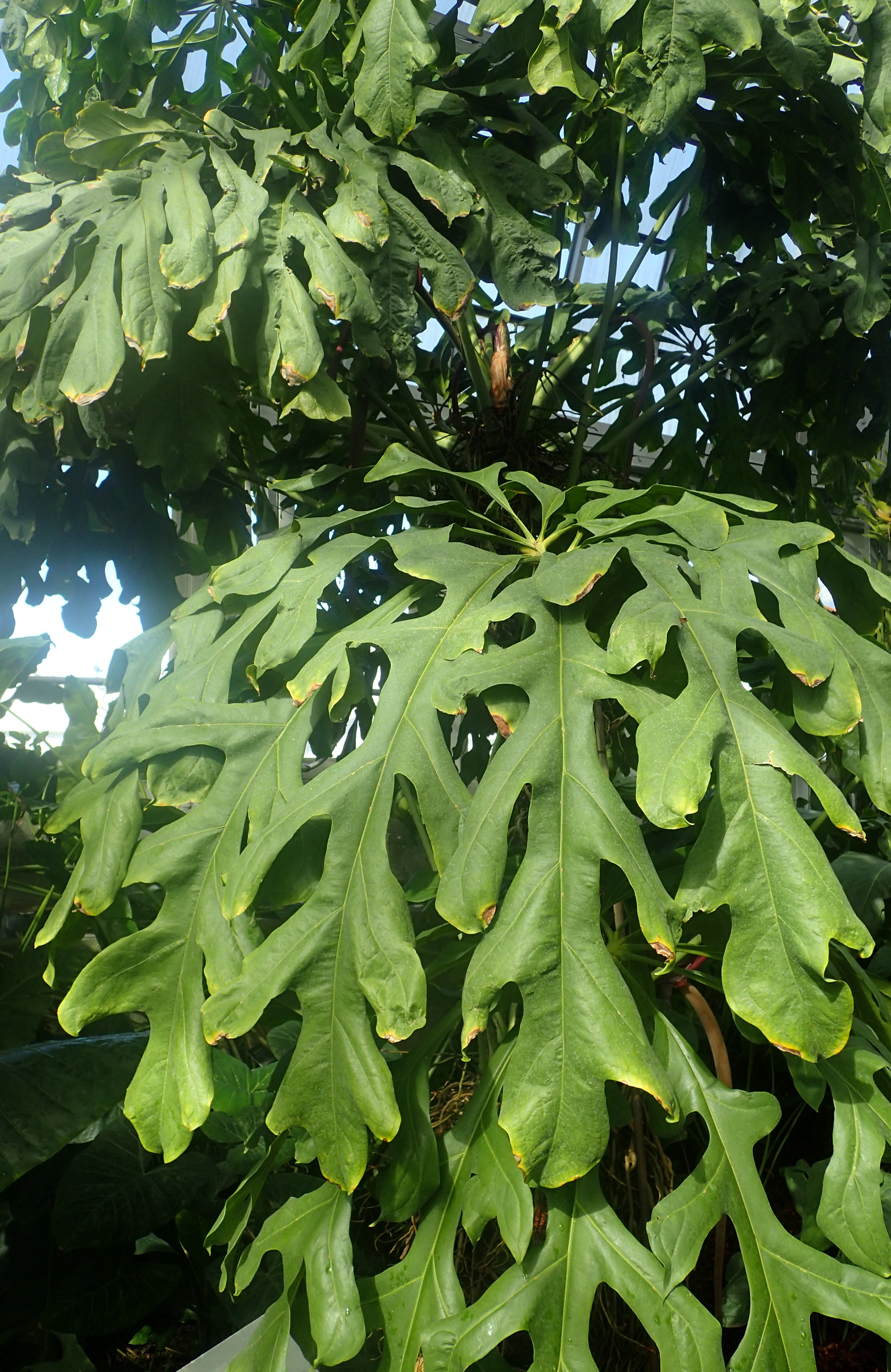
- A. clavigerum growing at the Garfield Park Conservatory

Scientific classification
- Kingdom: Plantae
- Clade: Tracheophytes
- Clade: Angiosperms
- Clade: Monocots
- Order: Alismatales
- Family: Araceae
- Genus: Anthurium
- Species: A. clavigerum

Binomial name
- Anthurium clavigerum Poepp.

= Anthurium clavigerum =

Species of plant

Anthurium clavigerum is a species of plant in the genus Anthurium. Native to Central and South America, it ranges from Honduras to central and western Brazil. This epiphyte has distinctive leaves that are deeply lobed and sometimes sinuous edges. The main stem can be several meters long and the palmate leaves can be 2 meters (6 ft 7 in) across, giving it the largest foliage of any Anthurium in Central America.
