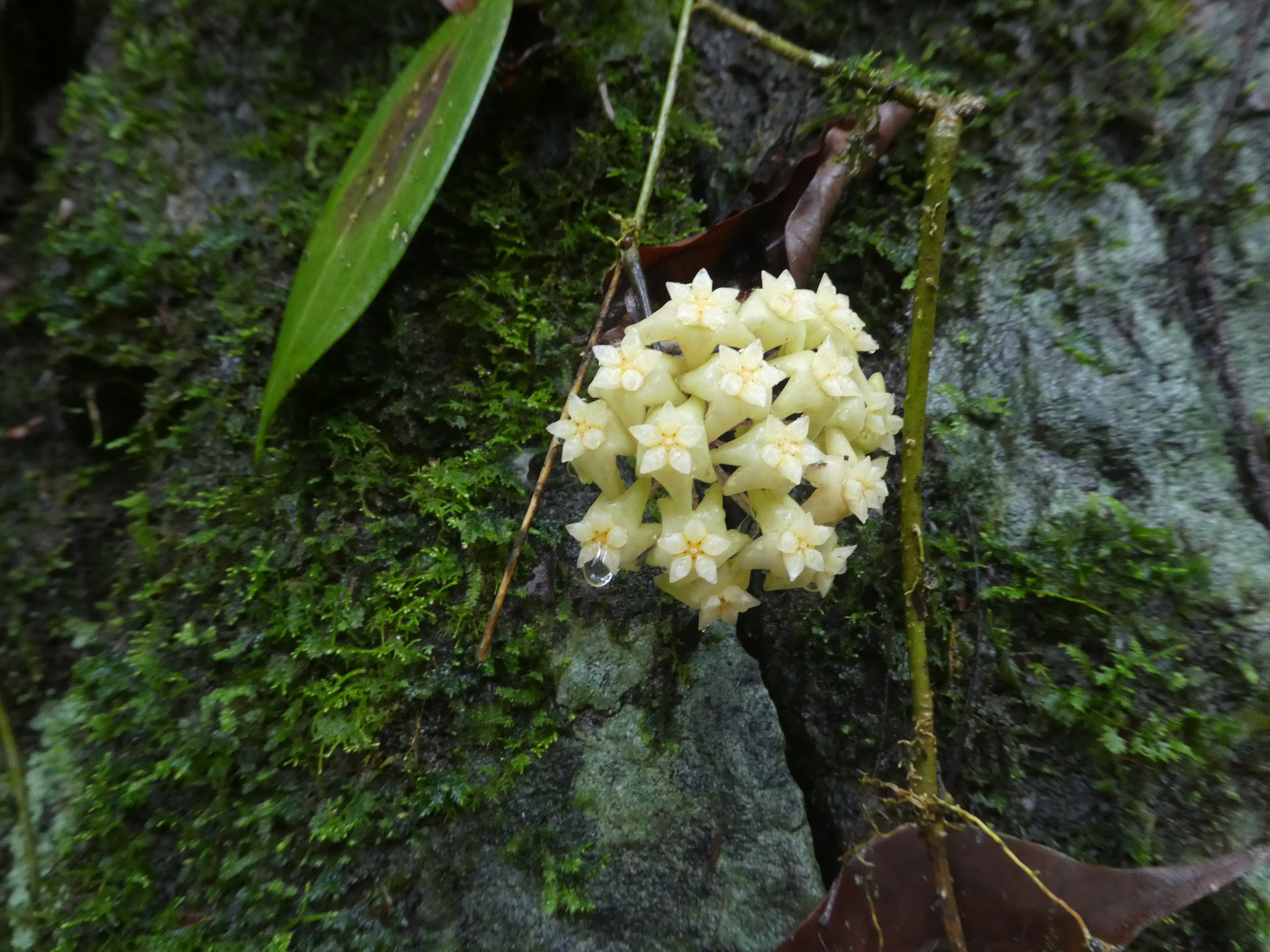
- In flower at Crystal Cascades near Cairns, Queensland

Conservation status
- Least Concern (NCA)

Scientific classification
- Kingdom: Plantae
- Clade: Embryophytes
- Clade: Tracheophytes
- Clade: Angiosperms
- Clade: Eudicots
- Clade: Asterids
- Order: Gentianales
- Family: Apocynaceae
- Genus: Hoya
- Species: H. verticillata

Binomial name
- Hoya verticillata (Vahl) G.Don

= Hoya verticillata =

Claret hoya

Species of flowering plant

Hoya verticillata, commonly known as claret hoya, is a species of climber in the oleander and frangipani family Apocynaceae. It is found from India to southern China, through southeast Asia to Indonesia and the Philippines. Called "Palu-lobboi" in Bangladesh.

== Description ==
This plant is a root climber but may also twine around objects, and all parts exude a white sap when broken. Leaves are arranged in opposite pairs and have 3 or 5 veins. Flowers are produced in racemes but appear to be in umbels.

== Taxonomy ==
In Australia, there are specimens known as Hoya pottsii, which Plants of the World Online (POWO) considers to be a synonym of H. verticillata, though POWO does not list Australia as part of the range of H. verticillata. Those Australian plants had been known as Hoya nicholsoniae F.Muell. before being renamed as H. pottsii. Mark Randal considered that the plants identified as Australian H. pottsii should still be regarded as H. nicholsoniae, a species that POWO does accept as native to Queensland, Australia.

=== Infraspecies ===
As of August 2026, POWO accepts the following three varieties:

- Hoya verticillata var. citrina (Ridl.) Veldkamp
- Hoya verticillata var. hendersonii (Kiew) Kloppenb.
- Hoya verticillata var. verticillata

=== Synonyms ===
- For H. verticillata
  - Sperlingia verticillata Vahl
- For H. v. var. citrina
  - Hoya acuta var. citrina (Ridl.) D.H.Kent
  - Hoya citrina Ridl.
  - Hoya parasitica var. citrina (Ridl.) Rintz
- For H. v. var. hendersonii
  - Hoya parasitica var. hendersonii Kiew
- For H. v. var. verticillata
  - Asclepias parasitica Wall. ex Hornem.
  - Hoya acuta Haw.
  - Hoya amoena Bakh.f.
  - Hoya amoena subsp. bogorensis T.Green & Ridl.
  - Hoya angustifolia Traill
  - Hoya balansae Costantin
  - Hoya bawanglingensis Shao Y.He & P.T.Li
  - Hoya cochinchinensis (Lour.) Schult.
  - Hoya globiflora Ridl.
  - Hoya hellwigii Warb. ex K.Schum. & Lauterb., nom. nud. (not properly described in a publication)
  - Hoya hookeriana Wight
  - Hoya nicobarica R.Br. ex J.Traill
  - Hoya obscurinervia Merr.
  - Hoya opposita (Vahl) G.Don
  - Hoya pallida Lindl.
  - Hoya parasitica (Wall. ex Hornem.) Wight
  - Hoya parasitica var. geoffrayi Costantin
  - Hoya parasitica var. spirei Costantin
  - Hoya pottsii Lindl.
  - Hoya pottsii var. angustifolia (Traill) Tsiang & P.T.Li
  - Hoya recurvula Ridl.
  - Hoya recurvula subsp. bokorensis Ridl. & Yap
  - Hoya ridleyi King & Gamble
  - Hoya trinervia Regel
  - Hoya trinervis Lindl.
  - Hoya ubudensis Ridl. & Yap
  - Hoya wibergiae Ridl.
  - Hoya wibergiae subsp. alba Ridl.
  - Schollia cochinchinensis (Lour.) J.Jacq.
  - Sperlingia opposita Vahl
  - Stapelia cochinchinensis Lour., nom. utique rej. (rejected outright)
  - Triplosperma cochinchinensis (Lour.) G.Don

== Conservation ==
Hoya pottsii is listed as least concern under the Queensland Government's Nature Conservation Act. As of 7 March 2025, it has not been assessed by the International Union for Conservation of Nature (IUCN).

== Uses ==
Parts of the plant are used for medicine in Bangladesh and India.
