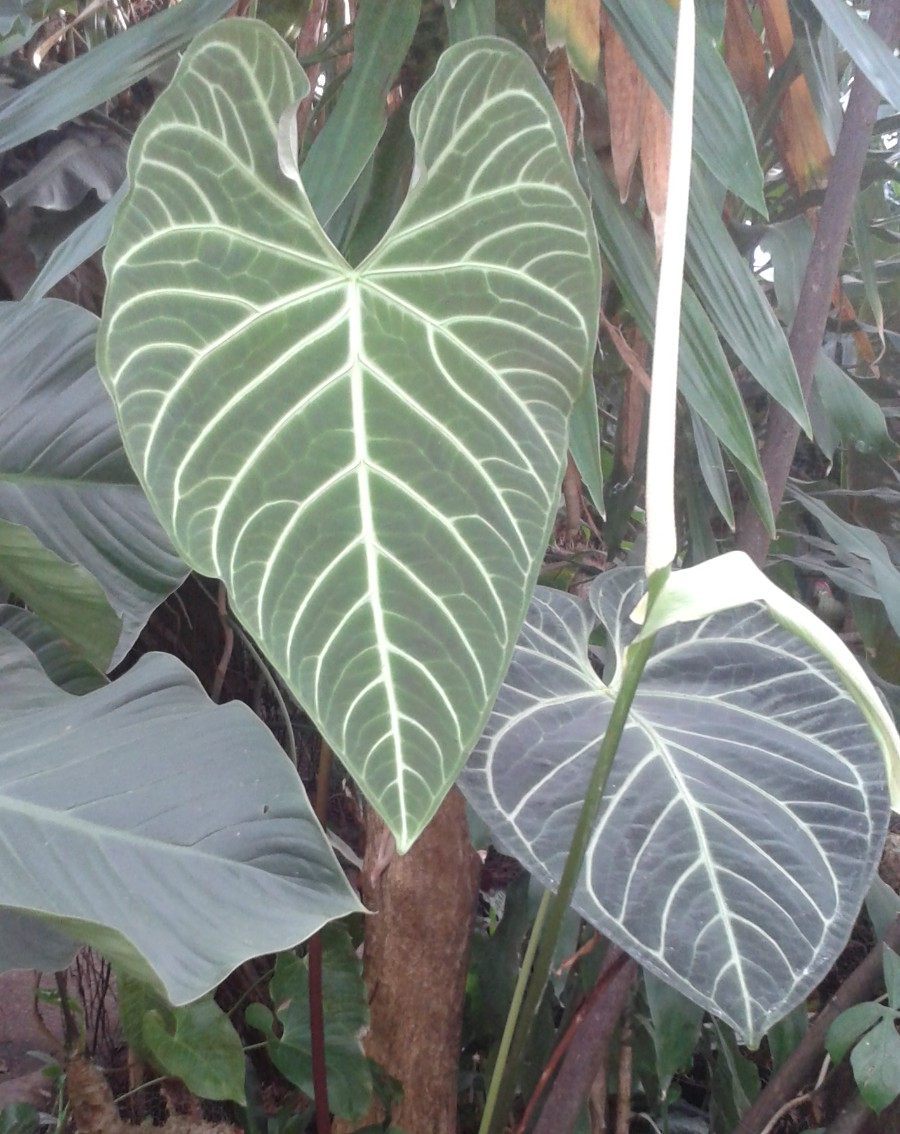
- A. regale (with white inflorescence slightly right of center), The Living Rainforest.
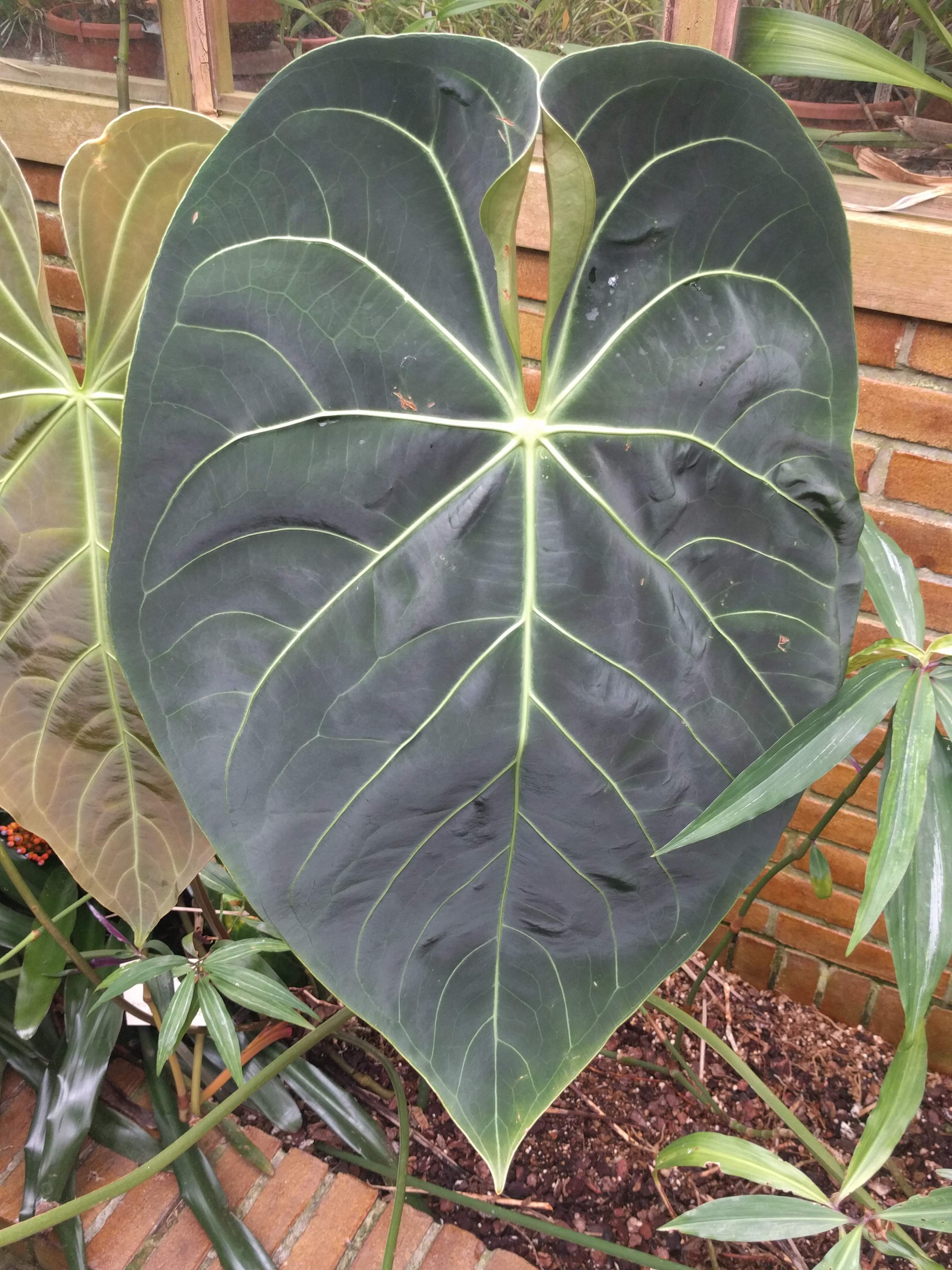
- Dark green specimen, Hortus Botanicus Leiden.

Scientific classification
- Kingdom: Plantae
- Clade: Tracheophytes
- Clade: Angiosperms
- Clade: Monocots
- Order: Alismatales
- Family: Araceae
- Genus: Anthurium
- Species: A. regale

Binomial name
- Anthurium regale Linden

= Anthurium regale =

Species of plant

Anthurium regale is a species of Anthurium (section Cardiolonchium), a genus of flowering aroid plant in the family Araceae. It was first described by Europeans in the 1866 edition of La Belgique Horticole, where it was noted to be first collected for the houseplant trade by Gustav Wallis during his time working for Jean Jules Linden. This impressive and sought-after Anthurium species is native to Peru, where it may be found near the Huallaga River valley, to the north of Tingo María and Juanjuí, in the regions of Huánuco and San Martín, respectively (with a number of specimens being described from the latter location). This species is found in forested areas, where it grows terrestrially, ranging from sea-level environments to cloud forests, up to about 243 meters (800 feet) in elevation. A. regale is often found in areas where the ambient humidity is consistently high, and where temperatures remain steadily between 15 °C (59°F) and 26.6 °C (80°F).

Anthurium regale is best known for its large, cordate leaves, which have a slight velvety texture and often display prominent white veining. Generally, mature leaves feature two to three distinct sizes of veins: one prominent, vertical white vein in the center, dividing the leaf in half; several smaller, lateral veins as offshoots; and several even smaller veins as further offshoots of those. Each lateral vein connects in a large "circle" around the leaf's edge, eventually all meeting at the leaf tip, where they connect with the dominant central vein.
