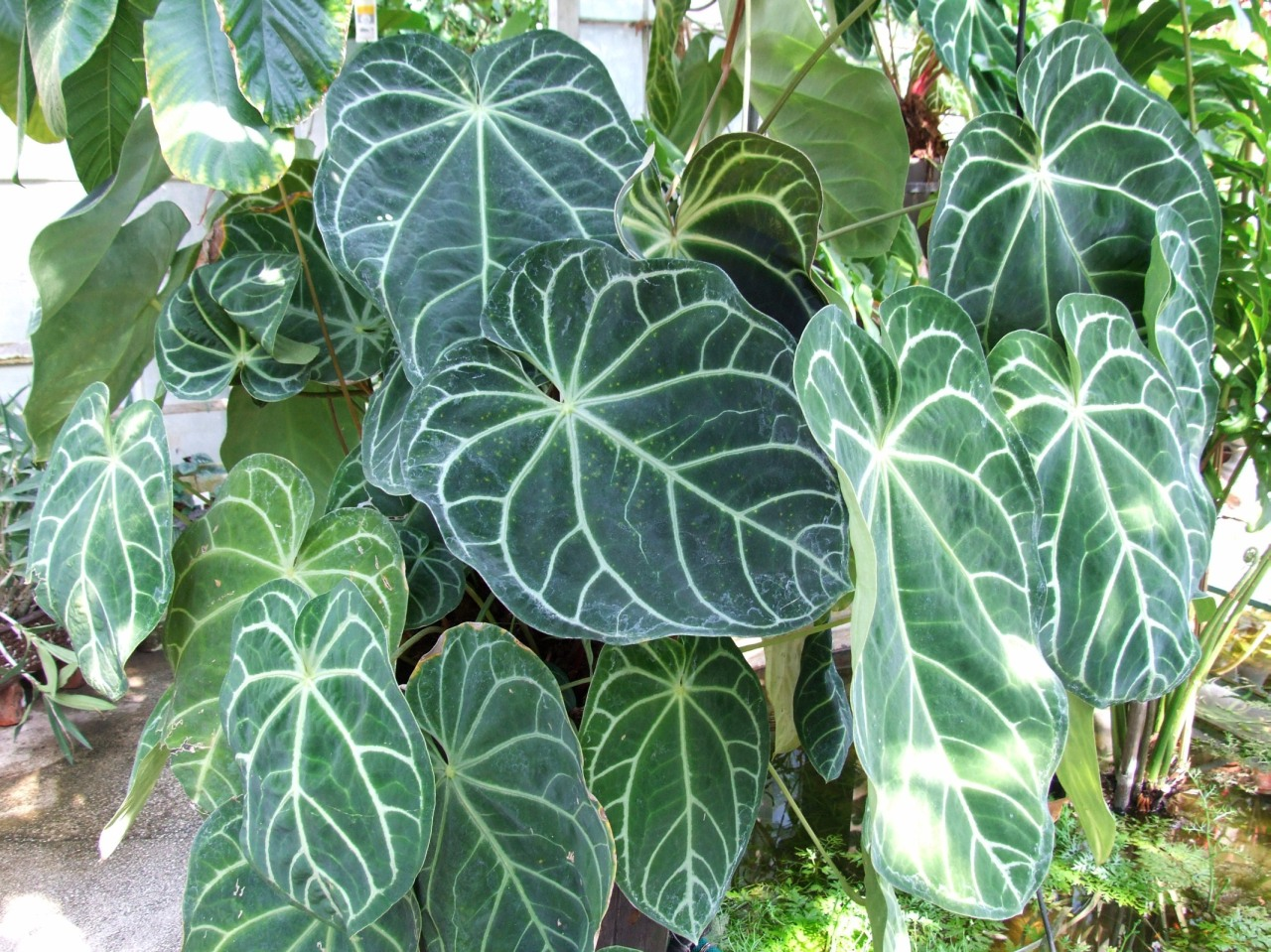

Conservation status
- Near Threatened (IUCN 3.1)

Scientific classification
- Kingdom: Plantae
- Clade: Tracheophytes
- Clade: Angiosperms
- Clade: Monocots
- Order: Alismatales
- Family: Araceae
- Genus: Anthurium
- Species: A. magnificum

Binomial name
- Anthurium magnificum Linden

Synonyms
- Anthurium sanderi Sander

= Anthurium magnificum =

Species of plant

Anthurium magnificum is a species of flowering plant in the family Araceae. It is endemic to Colombia. Closely resembling other Anthurium species like Anthurium crystallinum, it has large, cordate leaves with prominent veining and is primarily terrestrial. Plants of the true species can be distinguished primarily by their quadrangular petioles.
