= Hoya kentiana =

Scientific classification
- Kingdom: Plantae
- Clade: Tracheophytes
- Clade: Angiosperms
- Clade: Eudicots
- Clade: Asterids
- Order: Gentianales
- Family: Apocynaceae
- Genus: Hoya
- Species: H. kentiana

Binomial name
- Hoya kentiana C.M.Burton

Synonyms
- Hoya angustifolia Elmer; Hoya binuangensis Kloppenb.

Species of flowering plant

Hoya kentiana is a species of plants in the oleander and frangipani family Apocynaceae. It is native to the island of Luzon in the Philippines.
