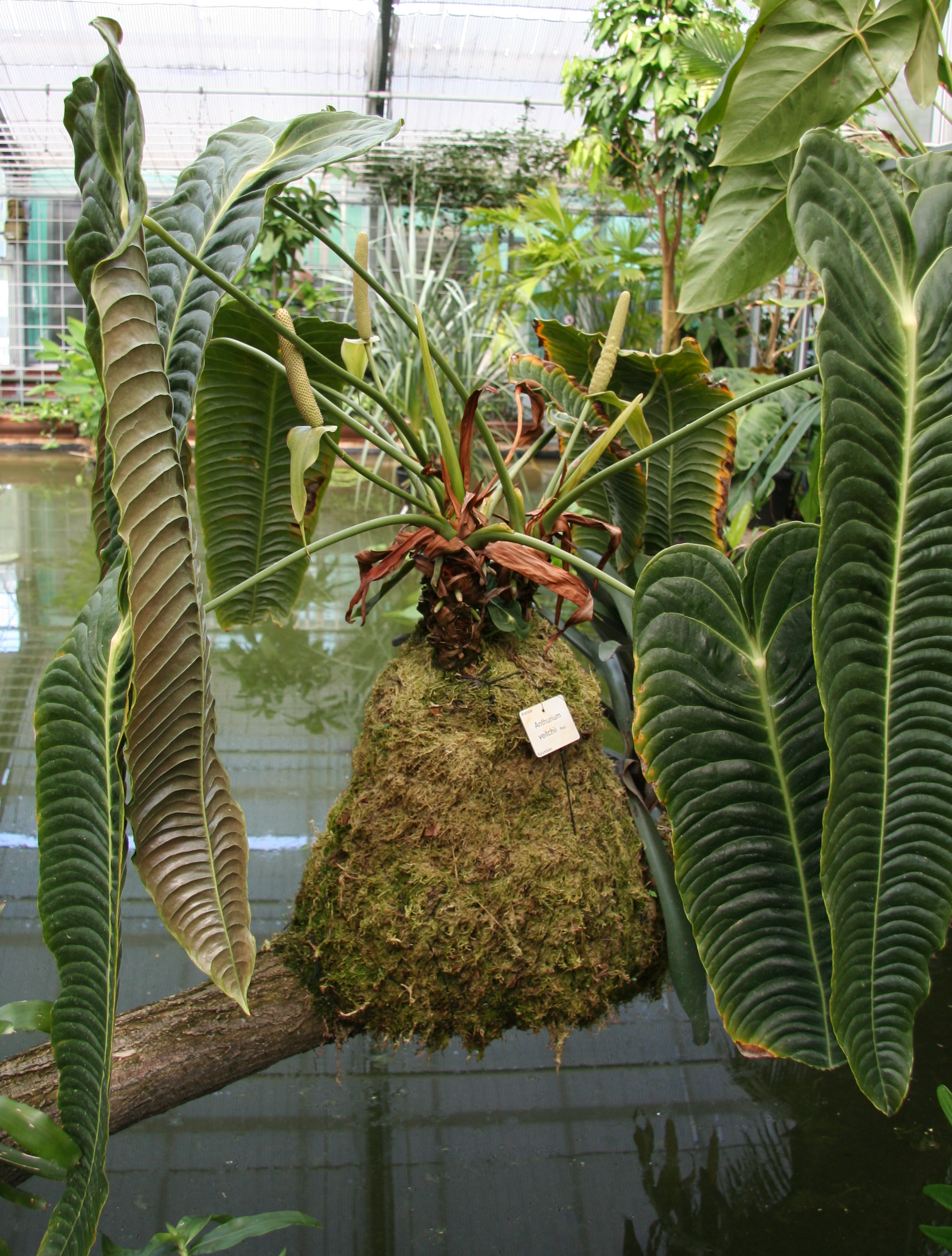
- Anthurium veitchii in the Dresden Botanical Garden

Scientific classification
- Kingdom: Plantae
- Clade: Tracheophytes
- Clade: Angiosperms
- Clade: Monocots
- Order: Alismatales
- Family: Araceae
- Genus: Anthurium
- Species: A. veitchii

Binomial name
- Anthurium veitchii Mast.

Synonyms
- Anthurium veitcheum Anon.; Anthurium veitchii var. acuminatum N.E.Br.

= Anthurium veitchii =

Species of flowering plant

Anthurium veitchii, the king anthurium, is a species of epiphytic flowering plant in the family Araceae. It is endemic to Colombia. It is grown in more temperate climates as a greenhouse or houseplant for its large, pendulous leaves that can be several feet long.

The Latin specific epithet veitchii refers to a longstanding group of plant nurseries based in Exeter, UK, originated by John Veitch.
