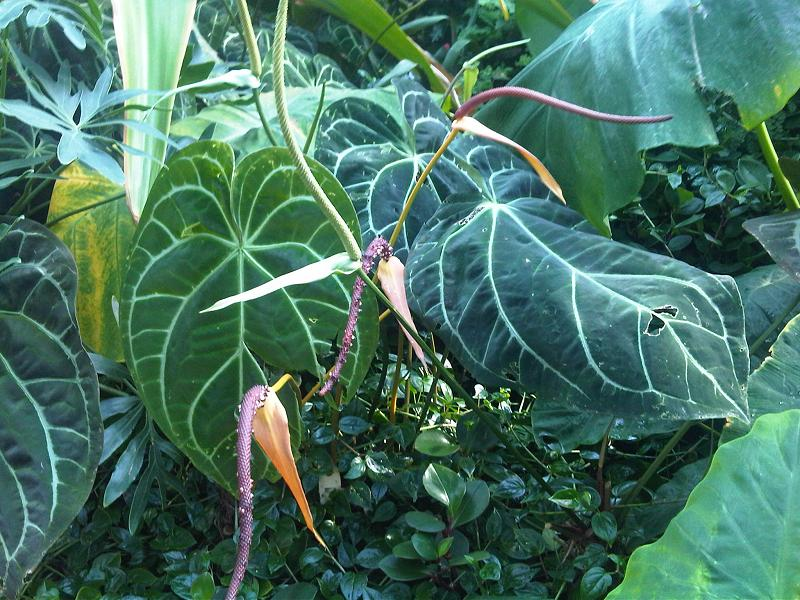

Scientific classification
- Kingdom: Plantae
- Clade: Tracheophytes
- Clade: Angiosperms
- Clade: Monocots
- Order: Alismatales
- Family: Araceae
- Genus: Anthurium
- Species: A. crystallinum

Binomial name
- Anthurium crystallinum Linden & André

Synonyms
- Anthurium crystallinum f. peltifolium Engl.; Anthurium killipianum L.Uribe

= Anthurium crystallinum =

Species of plant

Anthurium crystallinum is a species of flowering plant in the family Araceae, native to rainforest margins in Colombia and Panama. Growing to around 90 cm (35 in) tall and wide, A. crystallinum is an epiphytic perennial evergreen (in certain environments), known for its dark green and velvety-textured, heart-shaped leaves featuring prominent white veining, and somewhat resembles a smaller version of Anthurium magnificum. The inflorescence is a somewhat visually-undistinguished spathe with a pale green spadix (though ripening to red berries after pollination), appearing throughout the year.

== Cultivation ==
Requiring a minimum temperature of 16 °C (61 °F), in temperate regions, it is cultivated under glass, or indoors as a houseplant; it is even cultivated in a growroom or grow box (for young plantlets). A. crystallinum has gained the Royal Horticultural Society's Award of Garden Merit. The species is sometimes superficially confused with A. clarinervium and A. magnificum, both of which look rather similar, albeit differing in size and leaf presentation.

Today, A. crystallinum is widely bred, cultivated and hybridised, and has become fairly common on the plant market (albeit not generally in big-box stores or supermarkets that sell houseplants); high-quality, healthy plants are readily available online or from independent nurseries and growers. However, due to their somewhat delicate nature—when compared to other hardier species (such as A. andraeanum)—they are typically not recommended for novice gardeners.
