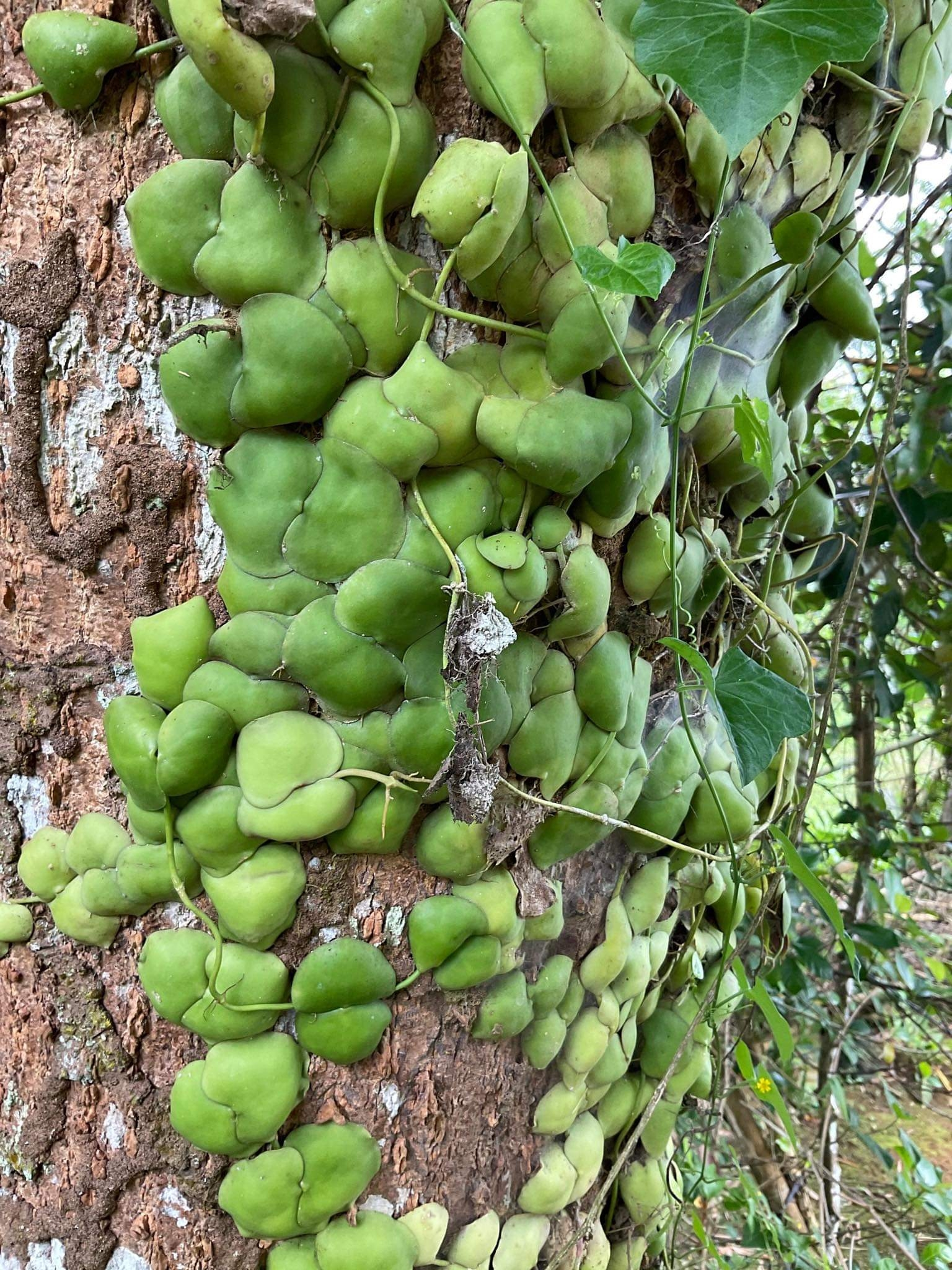

Scientific classification
- Kingdom: Plantae
- Clade: Tracheophytes
- Clade: Angiosperms
- Clade: Eudicots
- Clade: Asterids
- Order: Gentianales
- Family: Apocynaceae
- Genus: Dischidia
- Species: D. platyphylla

Binomial name
- Dischidia platyphylla Schltr.

= Dischidia platyphylla =

Species of plant

Dischidia platyphylla is a species of plant in the genus Dischidia native to the Philippines. Its name (platyphylla) refers to the flattened leaves, which as it climbs may cling in a shingle-like way to trees, similar to related species like Dischidia imbricata. These leaves are a form of domatia, which act as a shelter for ants in an example of mutualism with ants that is found in several species of Dischidia.
