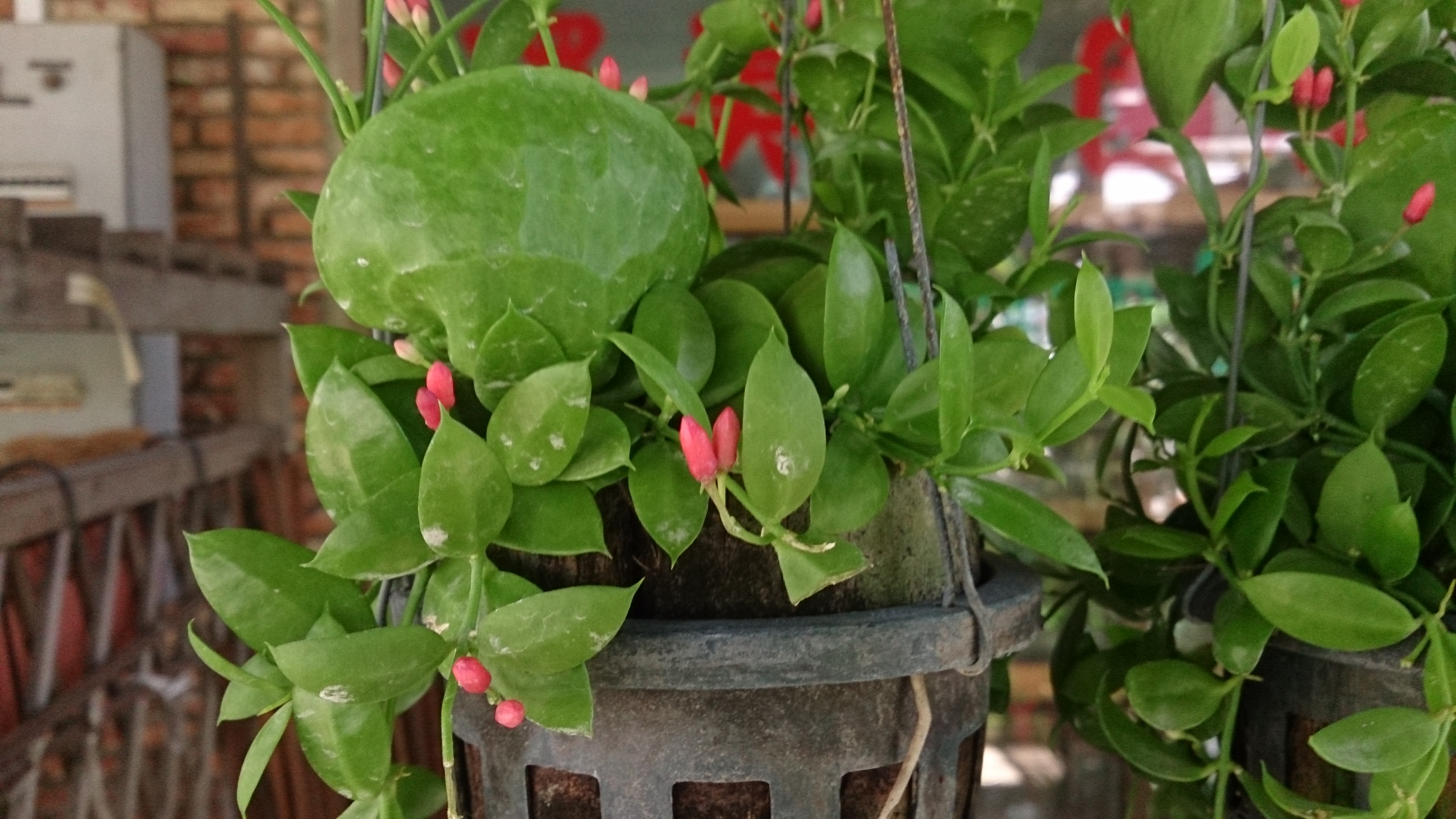
- In flower, and showing one of the hollow leaves

Scientific classification
- Kingdom: Plantae
- Clade: Tracheophytes
- Clade: Angiosperms
- Clade: Eudicots
- Clade: Asterids
- Order: Gentianales
- Family: Apocynaceae
- Genus: Dischidia
- Species: D. vidalii

Binomial name
- Dischidia vidalii Becc.

Synonyms
- Dischidia pectenoides H.Pearson

= Dischidia vidalii =

Species of flowering plant

Dischidia vidalii, commonly known as ant plant or kangaroo pocket, is a plant in the frangipani family Apocynaceae native to the Philippines. It is a climbing plant with clusters of pink or magenta flowers. Like some other species in the genus — e.g. Dischidia major — and in the related genus Hoya, this species has evolved a symbiotic relationship with ants. In addition to small, oval leaves the plant develops significantly larger, hollow leaves where additional roots grow, and these leaves are colonised by ants.
