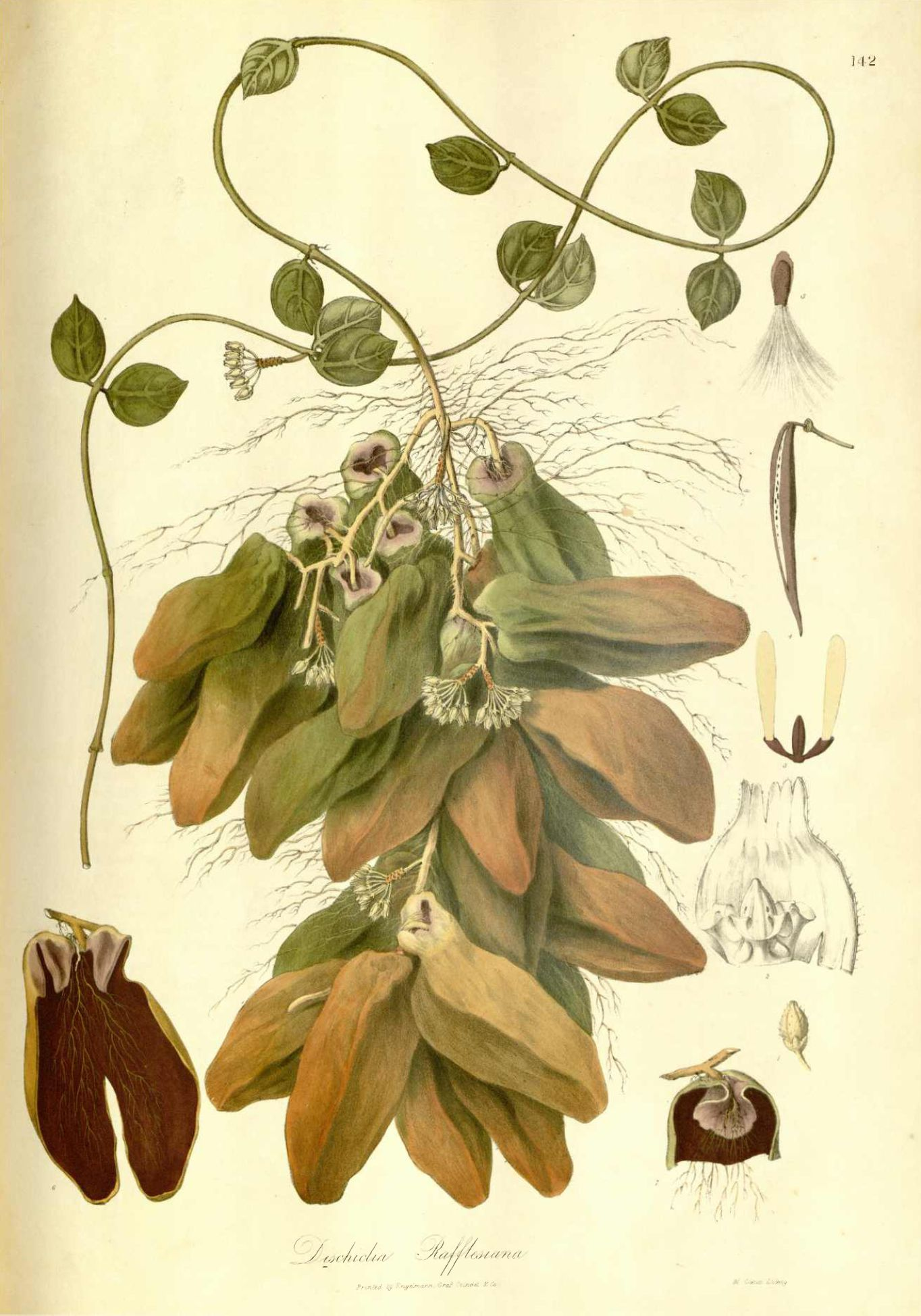
- Plate 142 from Plantae Asiaticae Rariores

Scientific classification
- Kingdom: Plantae
- Clade: Tracheophytes
- Clade: Angiosperms
- Clade: Eudicots
- Clade: Asterids
- Order: Gentianales
- Family: Apocynaceae
- Genus: Dischidia
- Species: D. major

Binomial name
- Dischidia major (Vahl) Merr.

= Dischidia major =

Species of epiphyte

Dischidia major (Synonym Dischidia rafflesiana), the Malayan urn vine, is a plant in the genus Dischidia. They carry modified leaves, offering accommodation to ants, including those of the family Dolichoderinae, (most commonly Iridomyrmex myrmecodiae) and in return gain some sustenance from increased carbon dioxide and nitrogen levels, and a degree of protection from noxious animals and plants. This mutualism trait, known as myrmecophily, is widespread across the plant world and clearly carries considerable benefits for both ants and plant.

Dischidia major is found in wet-tropical forests in Southeast Asia from Malaya east to northern Australia. It twines around the branches and trunks of trees, having a preference for those that are decaying. It produces both circular succulent leaves of about 2 cm diameter, and hollow, pouch-like 12 cm long leaves, reminiscent of the fruits of Araujia sericifera, a related species. These modified leaves, pitchers or ascidia, are purplish and richly dotted with stomata on the inner surface, and have an opening at the top end near the stalk. Organic debris and rainwater, possibly augmented by secreted fluids, accumulate in the cavity over the course of time, offering a source of nutrition which the plant uses by growing roots into the chamber. Dischidia astephana and D. parvifolia do not provide housing for resident ants, but have roots that penetrate decaying wood and humus, reaching into the ant nests and presumably obtaining nutrients from the ant waste there.

Dischidia major flowers are yellow striped with green, and arranged in few or many-flowered umbels. The fruit of D. major consists of the usual horn-shaped pair of follicles while the seed has a tuft of silky hairs at one end and includes an edible portion or elaiosome as incentive for ants to move the seed (myrmecochory) into nests inside the tree with an improved chance of germination and growth.

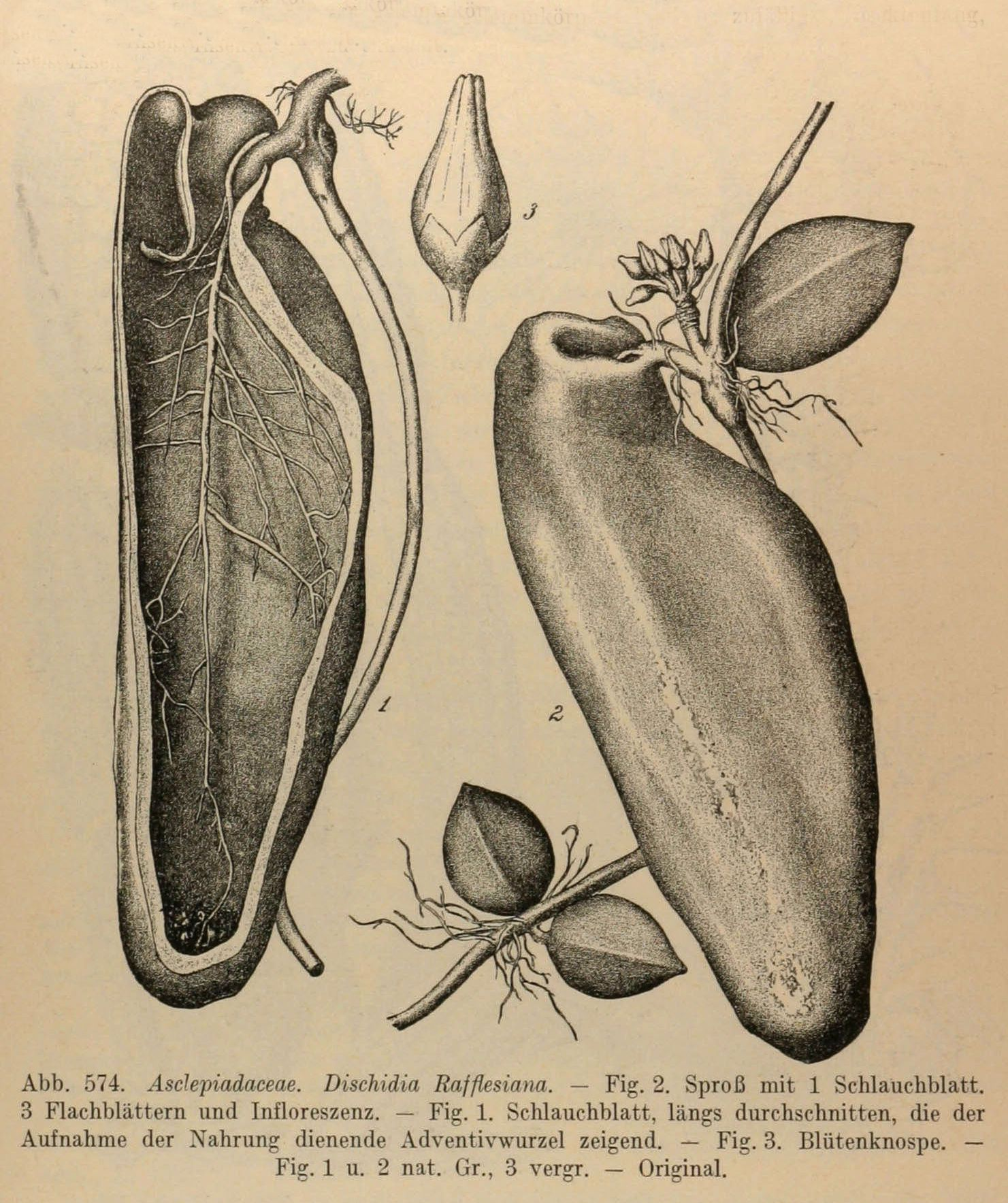
Plate from Richard Wettstein's Handbuch der Systematischen Botanik 1924

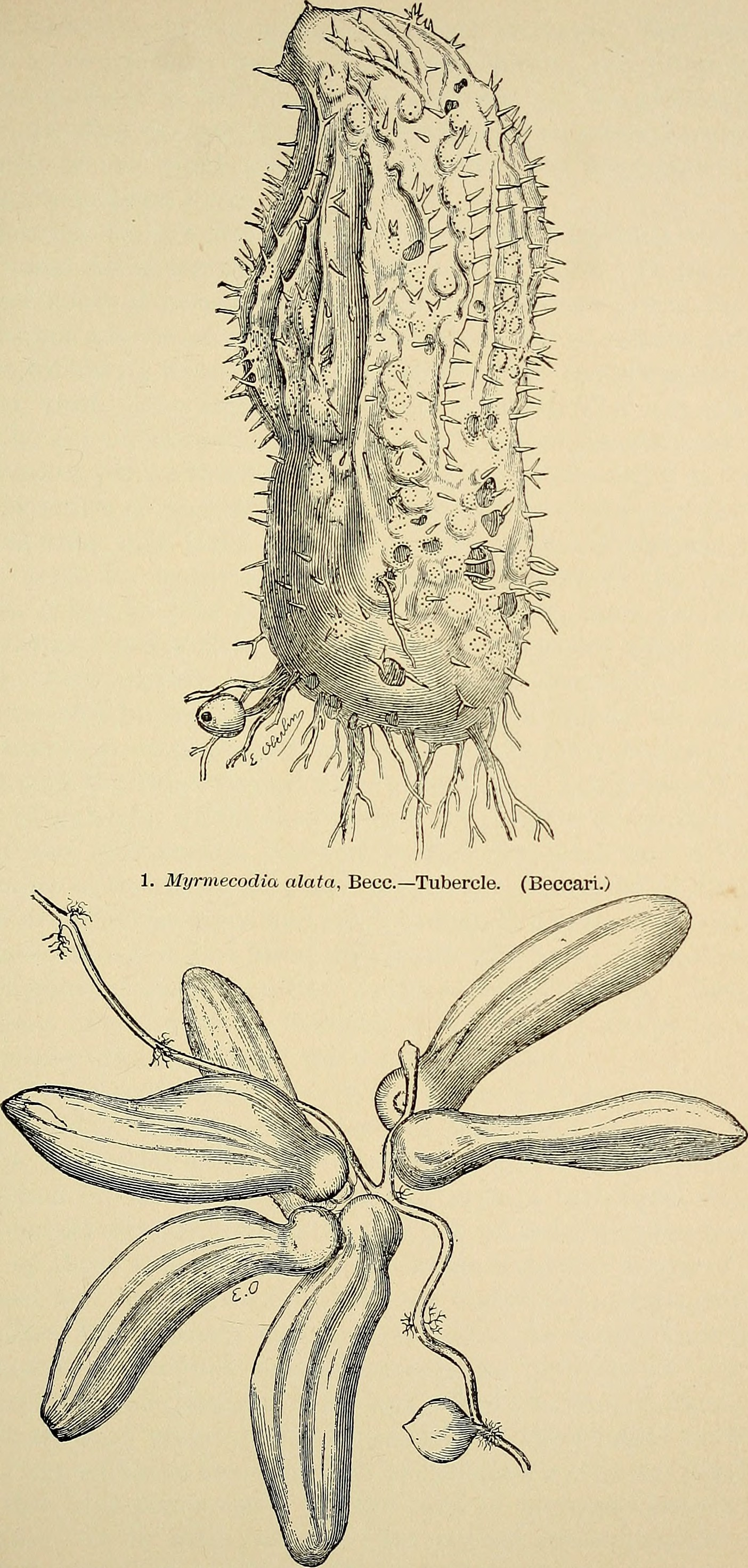
Plate from Smithsonian Institution report, 1896

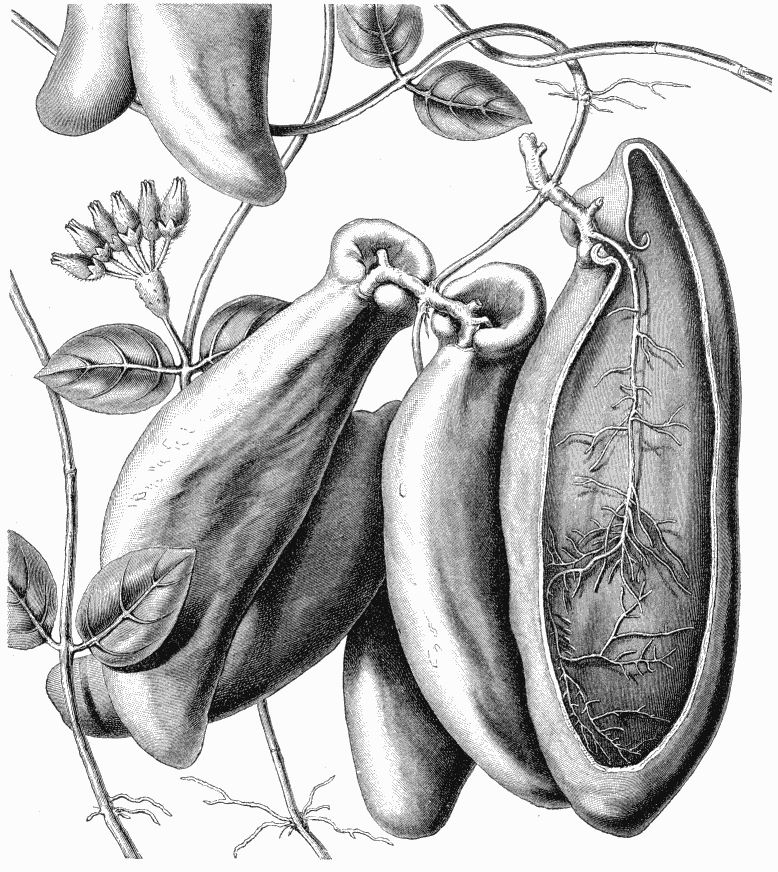
Plate from Anton Joseph Kerner von Marilaun, Adolf Hansen: Pflanzenleben

== Bibliography ==
- The Ecology and Evolution of Ant-Plant Interactions - Victor Rico-Gray & Paulo S. Oliveira (University of Chicago Press, 2007)
