= Dischidia diphylla =

Scientific classification
- Kingdom: Plantae
- Clade: Tracheophytes
- Clade: Angiosperms
- Clade: Eudicots
- Clade: Asterids
- Order: Gentianales
- Family: Apocynaceae
- Genus: Dischidia
- Species: D. diphylla

Binomial name
- Dischidia diphylla Elmer

Species of plant

Dischidia diphylla was described by Adolph Daniel Edward Elmer but never validly published since Elmer failed to include Latin diagnoses or descriptions for the species he described after 1934.

This species is known from the Philippines on Luzon Island. It is considered to be one of the ant plants and has large imbricate leaves. The flowers are yellow.
