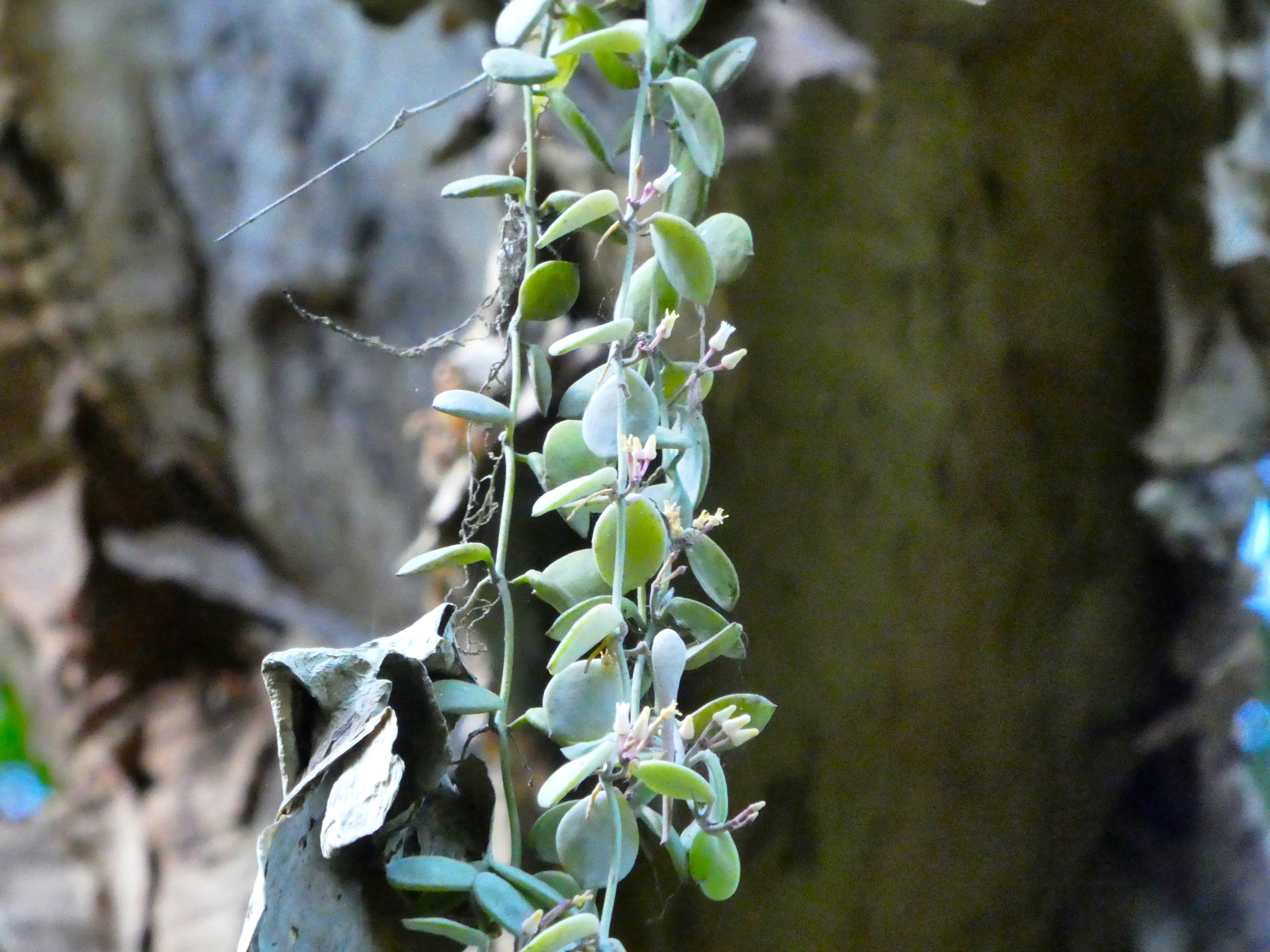
- Dischidia nummularia with flowers and buds

Scientific classification
- Kingdom: Plantae
- Clade: Tracheophytes
- Clade: Angiosperms
- Clade: Eudicots
- Clade: Asterids
- Order: Gentianales
- Family: Apocynaceae
- Subfamily: Asclepiadoideae
- Tribe: Marsdenieae
- Genus: Dischidia; R.Br.

Synonyms
- Collyris Vahl; Conchophyllum Blume; Dischidiopsis Schltr.; Dolichostegia Schltr.; Hoyella Ridl.; Leptostemma Blume; Oistonema Schltr.; Spathidolepis Schltr.

= Dischidia =

Genus of epiphytes

Dischidia is a genus of plants in the "dog-bane" family Apocynaceae, collectively known as the "milkweeds" (true perennial milkweeds in the Apocynaceae are found in the genus Asclepias). They are epiphytes, native to tropical areas of China, India as well as Bhutan’s southern borders, wherever minimal frost occurs. Additionally, they are known from most areas of Mainland Southeast Asia, including forested areas of Myanmar, Thailand, Vietnam, Cambodia, Laos, and some parts of Indonesia, Malaysia and Singapore. Several species are also native to Papua New Guinea, northeastern Australia, Mariana Islands and other Pacific islands.

== Description ==
=== Overview ===
Dischidia are closely related to their sister-genus Hoya, whose range they overlap in some regions. Unlike Hoya, the genus Dischidia is poorly-known and has not been studied as closely.

=== Ecology ===
Most Dischidia grow in arboreal ant nests, of various species, and several have developed a symbiotic relationship with the insects. The plants have even evolved modified leaves to provide the ants housing and/or storage, in exchange for pollination of their blooms. Of these symbiotic adaptations, there are two types of modification to the leaves:

==== Bullate leaves ====
Three species are known to have evolved bullate leaves (hollow, bulbous structures housing the plant's root); Dischidia complex Griff, Dischidia major (Vahl) Merr. and Dischidia vidalii Becc. Both produce normal leaves (cordate in shape) in addition to the bullate ones. These bullate leaves are formed when the outer margins of a leaf stop growing, while the center of the leaf continues to grow. As time progresses, the leaf margins curl under (to close the gap), which creates a small hole.

==== Imbricate leaves ====
A number of species develop imbricate leaves, which adhere tightly to the growing surface. The underside of the leaf has a space which is filled with roots, and that the ants take advantage of, such as Dischidia major, Dischidia astephana, Dischidia imbricata and Dischidia platyphylla, including many more. Plants with this type of growth habit are referred to as shingling plants, as their leaves will tend to overlap in a row as they climb up a tree, wall, or rock face, giving the appearance of tiles or roof shingles. This adaptation is evident in many other plant species, especially in the family Araceae, including Monstera dubia, some species of Epipremnum, Rhaphidophora hayi, R. cryptantha, and Scindapsus. Other clear examples of shingling can be found with the growth habits of English ivy, Marcgravia, and Ficus pumila (creeping fig).

== Cultivation ==
A few of the species are in widespread cultivation, and can be kept as houseplants in temperate regions, or in protected conditions. At some point, between the years 2015–2020, a few species and cultivars became known via the houseplant trade, especially D. ovata, D. nummularia, and D. oiantha, along with several more. Awareness of the genus, as well as its overall popularity, has steadily increased among tropical plant growers and enthusiasts.

== Species ==
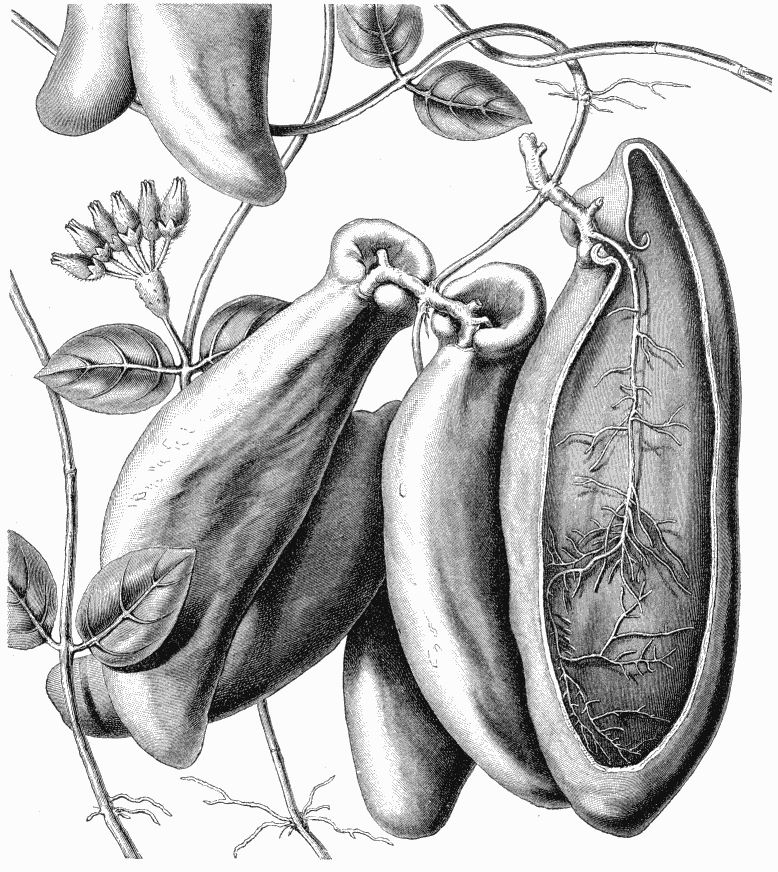
D. major illustration from Pflanzenleben by Anton Kerner von Marilaun, 1913

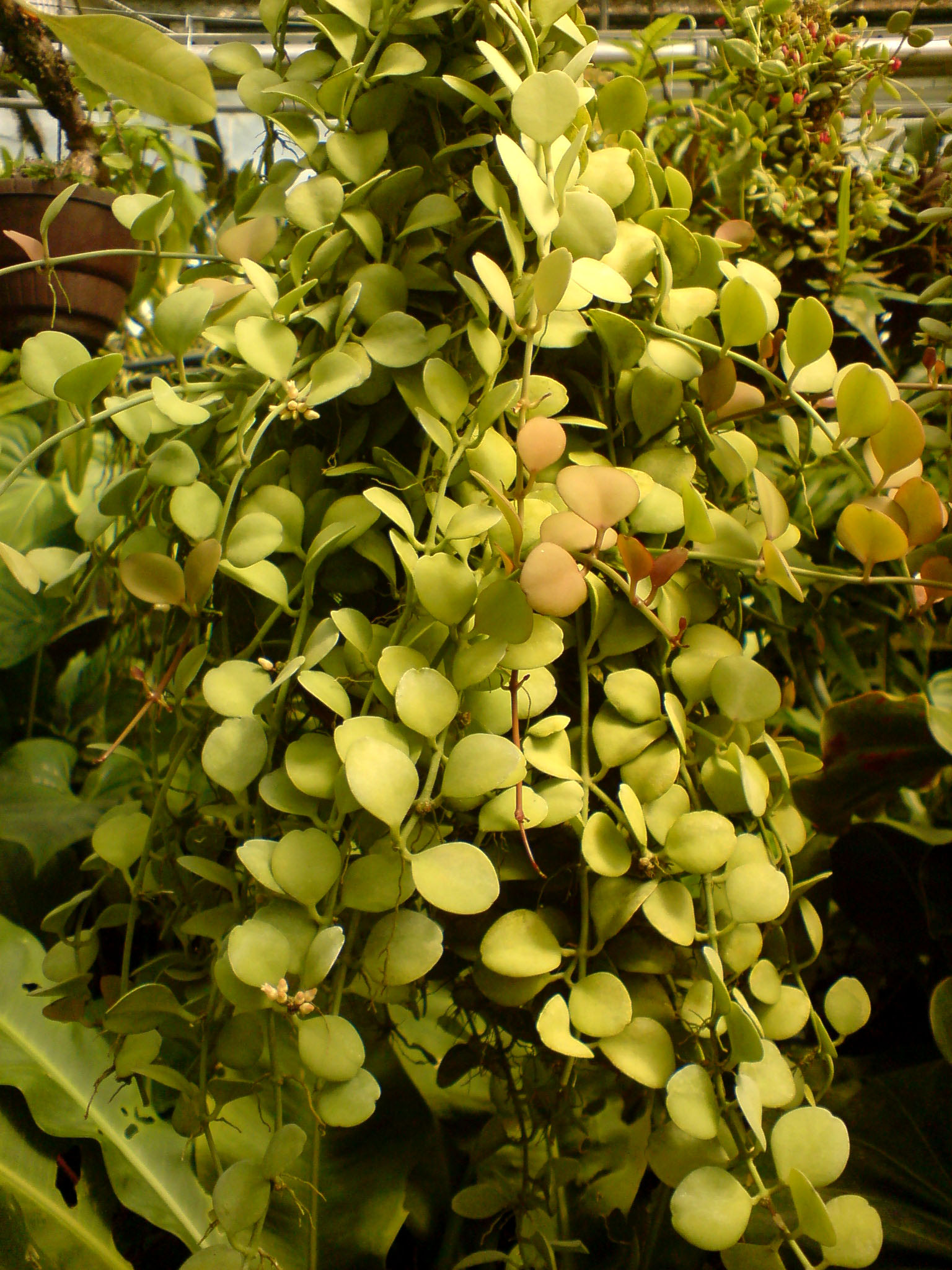
D. bengalensis, Göttingen

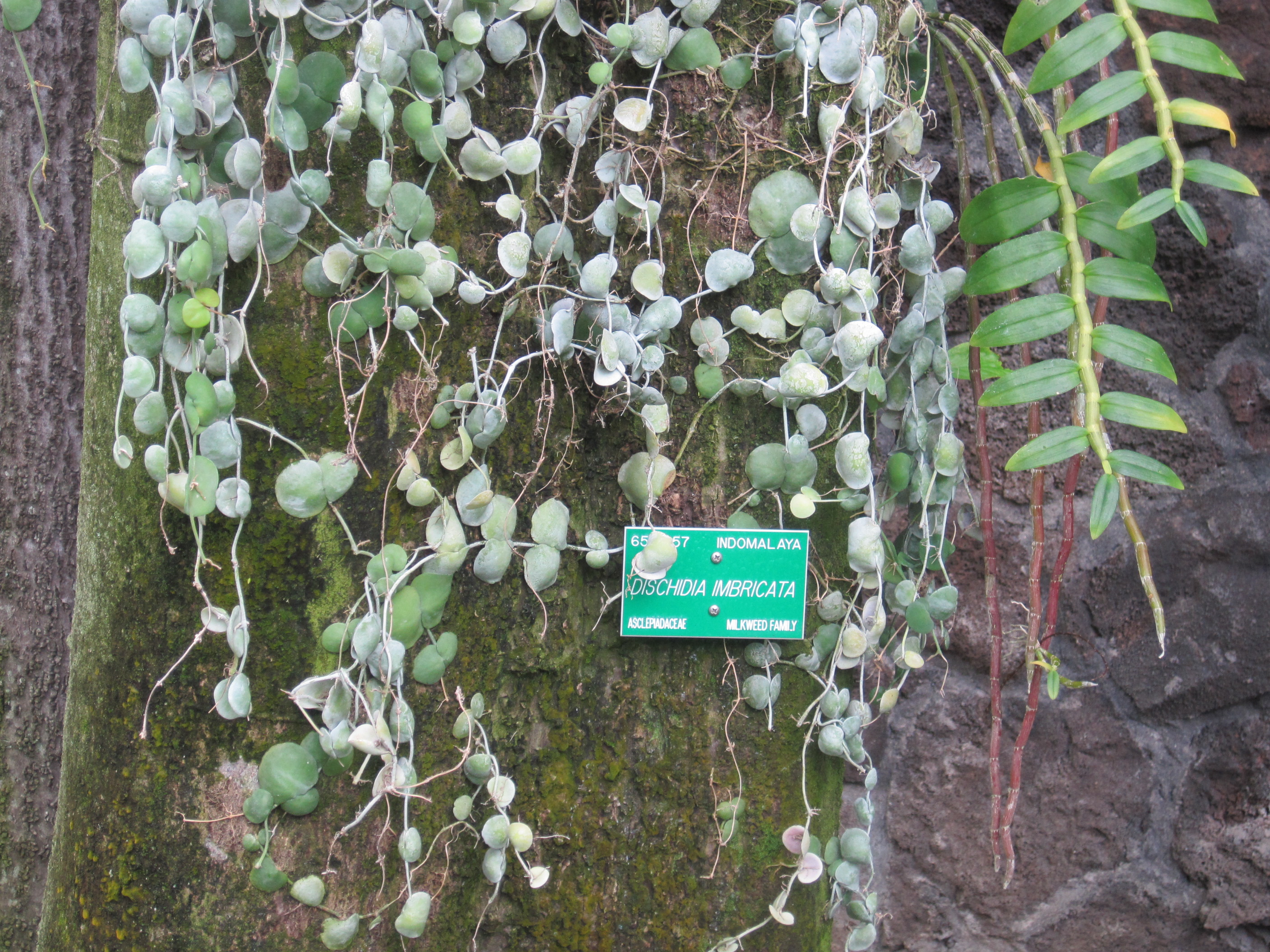
D. imbricata on Millettia pinnata at Foster Botanical Garden, Honolulu

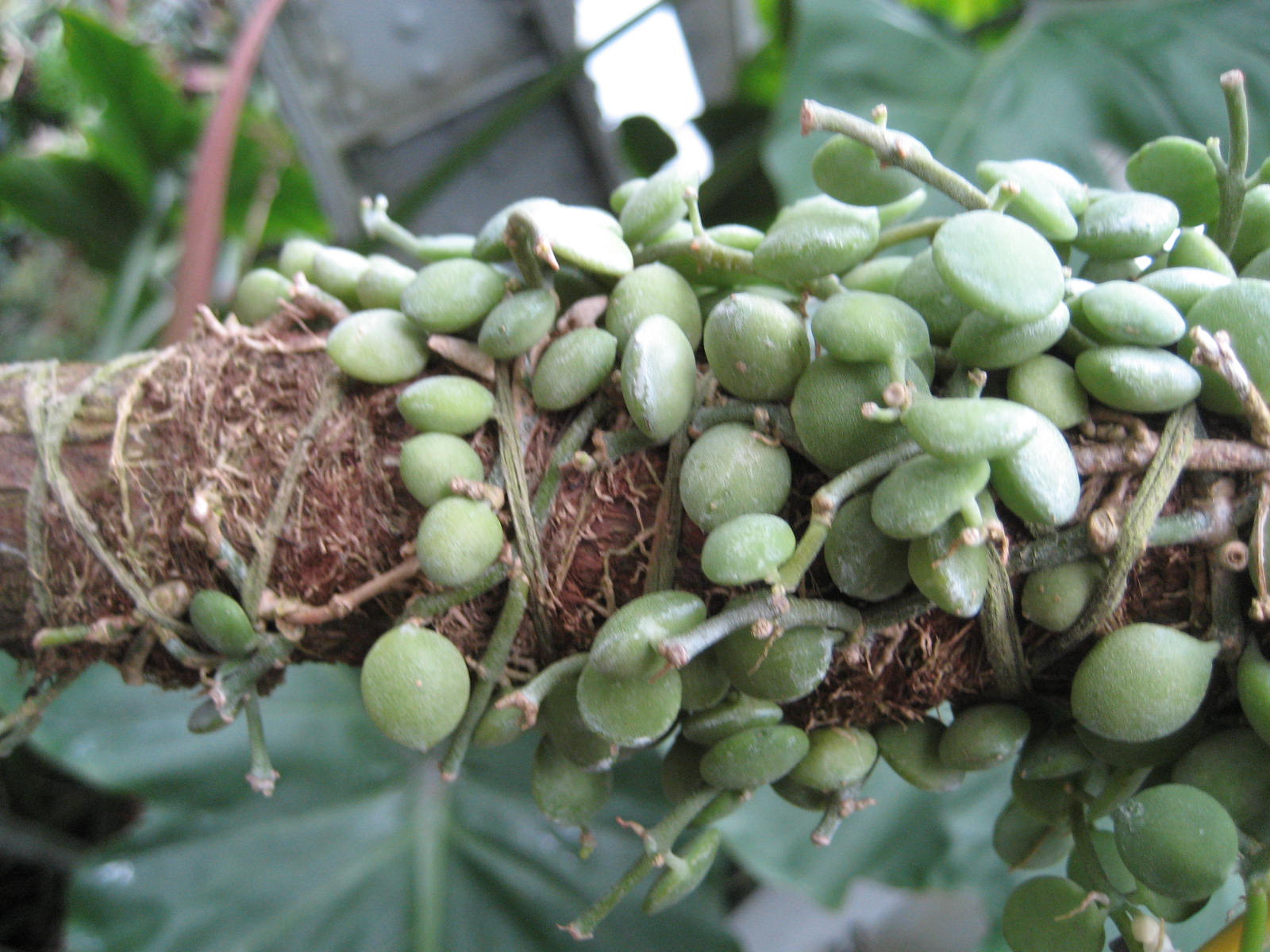
D. nummularia habitus, Berlin

The following is an alphabetical listing of the 128 species in this genus that are accepted by Plants of the World Online as of February 2025.

- Dischidia aberrans Schltr.
- Dischidia acuminata Costantin
- Dischidia acutifolia Maingay ex Hook.f.
- Dischidia albida Griff.
- Dischidia albiflora Griff.
- Dischidia alternans Schltr.
- Dischidia amphorantha K.Schum. & Lauterb.
- Dischidia angustifolia Miq.
- Dischidia antennifera Becc.
- Dischidia argentii Arshed, J.R.Callado & Tandang
- Dischidia asperifolia Schltr.
- Dischidia astephana Scort. ex King & Gamble
- Dischidia atropurpurea Schltr.
- Dischidia bengalensis Colebr.
- Dischidia bisetulosa O.Schwartz
- Dischidia boholensis (Schltr.) Livsh.
- Dischidia calva Kerr
- Dischidia carinata (Schltr.) Arshed, Agoo & Rodda
- Dischidia chinensis Champ. ex Benth.
- Dischidia cleistantha Livsh.
- Dischidia clemensiae Schltr.
- Dischidia cochleata Blume
- Dischidia collyris Wall.
- Dischidia cominsii Hemsl.
- Dischidia complex Griff.
- Dischidia cornuta Livsh.
- Dischidia crassifolia Zipp. ex Schltr.
- Dischidia crassula Schltr.
- Dischidia cyclophylla Schltr.
- Dischidia cylindrica W.W.Sm.
- Dischidia dasyphylla Schltr.
- Dischidia deschampsii King & Gamble
- Dischidia digitiformis Becc.
- Dischidia dohtii T.B.Tran & Livsh.
- Dischidia dolichantha Schltr.
- Dischidia elmeri Schltr.
- Dischidia ericiflora Becc.
- Dischidia formosana Maxim.
- Dischidia fruticulosa Ridl.
- Dischidia galactantha K.Schum.
- Dischidia gibbifera Schltr.
- Dischidia glabrata Arshed & Tandang
- Dischidia griffithii Hook.f.
- Dischidia hahliana Volkens
- Dischidia hirsuta (Blume) Decne.
- Dischidia hollrungii Warb. ex K.Schum. & Lauterb.
- Dischidia hoyella Omlor
- Dischidia imbricata (Blume) Steud.
- Dischidia immortalis Guillaumin
- Dischidia incrassata (Schltr.) Arshed, Agoo & Rodda
- Dischidia indragirensis Schltr.
- Dischidia insularis Schltr.
- Dischidia kerrii Kidyoo & Suddee
- Dischidia khasiana Hook.f.
- Dischidia kutchinensis Becc.
- Dischidia lanceolata (Blume) Decne.
- Dischidia lancifolia Merr.
- Dischidia latifolia (Blume) Decne.
- Dischidia lauterbachii K.Schum.
- Dischidia listerophora Schltr.
- Dischidia litoralis Schltr.
- Dischidia longe-pedunculata Ridl.
- Dischidia longiflora Becc.
- Dischidia longifolia Becc.
- Dischidia luzonica (Schltr.) Arshed, Agoo & Rodda
- Dischidia major (Vahl) Merr.
- Dischidia mariae (Schltr.) Arshed, Agoo & Rodda
- Dischidia maxima Koord.
- Dischidia melanesica Fosberg
- Dischidia meleagridiflora O.Schwartz
- Dischidia merrillii Schltr.
- Dischidia micholitzii N.E.Br.
- Dischidia micrantha Becc.
- Dischidia milnei Hemsl.
- Dischidia neurophylla Lauterb. & K.Schum.
- Dischidia nicobarica Didr.
- Dischidia nummularia R.Br.
- Dischidia oblongata Arshed, Agoo & Rodda
- Dischidia obovata Decne.
- Dischidia oiantha Schltr.
- Dischidia ovata Benth.
- Dischidia oxyphylla Miq.
- Dischidia papuana Warb.
- Dischidia parasita (Blanco) Arshed, Agoo & Rodda
- Dischidia parvifolia Ridl.
- Dischidia peltata Blume
- Dischidia phuphanensis Chatan & Promprom
- Dischidia picta Blume
- Dischidia platyphylla Schltr.
- Dischidia polilloensis Kloppenb.
- Dischidia polyphylla Ridl.
- Dischidia puberula Decne.
- Dischidia pubescens Ridl.
- Dischidia punctata (Blume) Decne.
- Dischidia purpurea Merr.
- Dischidia quinquangularis Schltr.
- Dischidia reniformis Schltr.
- Dischidia retusa Becc.
- Dischidia rhodantha Ridl.
- Dischidia rimicola Kerr
- Dischidia rosea Schltr.
- Dischidia roseoflavida Schltr.
- Dischidia rostrata Arshed, Agoo & Rodda
- Dischidia rumphii Miq.
- Dischidia ruscifolia Decne. ex Becc.
- Dischidia saccata Warb.
- Dischidia sagittata (Blume) Decne.
- Dischidia sarasinorum Warb.
- Dischidia scortechinii King & Gamble
- Dischidia singularis Craib
- Dischidia soronensis Becc.
- Dischidia spironema Turcz.
- Dischidia squamulosa Becc.
- Dischidia striata Schltr.
- Dischidia subulata Warb.
- Dischidia superba Rintz
- Dischidia thaithongiae Kidyoo
- Dischidia thongphaphumensis Samsungnoen, Kidyoo & A.Kidyoo
- Dischidia tjidadapensis Bakh.f.
- Dischidia tomentella Ridl.
- Dischidia tonkinensis Costantin
- Dischidia tonsuensis T.Green & Kloppenb.
- Dischidia torricellensis (Schltr.) P.I.Forst.
- Dischidia tricholoba Kerr
- Dischidia trichostemma Schltr.
- Dischidia truncata (Blume) Decne.
- Dischidia vadosa Rintz
- Dischidia vidalii Becc.

Species moved to other genera

1. Dischidia chinghungensis, syn of Hoya chinghungensis
2. Dischidia yunnanensis, syn of Biondia yunnanensis

Species with Nomen nudum

1. Dischidia diphylla Elmer
