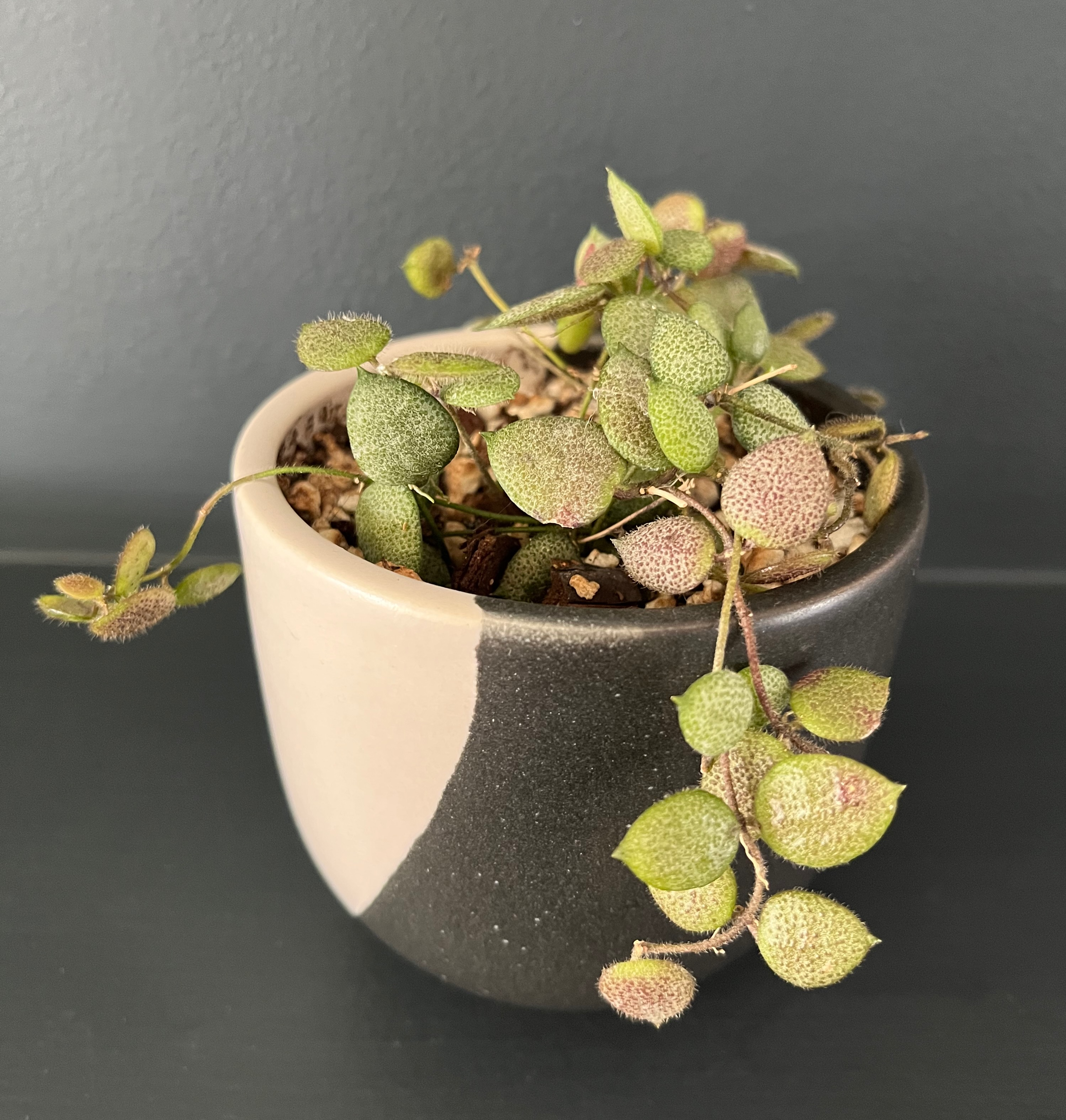
- Dischidia hirsuta grown as a houseplant

Scientific classification
- Kingdom: Plantae
- Clade: Tracheophytes
- Clade: Angiosperms
- Clade: Eudicots
- Clade: Asterids
- Order: Gentianales
- Family: Apocynaceae
- Genus: Dischidia
- Species: D. hirsuta

Binomial name
- Dischidia hirsuta (Blume) Decne.

= Dischidia hirsuta =

Species of plant

Dischidia hirsuta is a species of plant in the genus Dischidia. It is widely distributed in Southeast Asia from Thailand through Vietnam, Indonesia, the Philippines and continuing to the Solomon Islands. It grows as an epiphyte and its name refers to its often hirsute foliage covered in fine hairs, though the species has variable foliage and flowers throughout its range. Its succulent leaves may be lanceolate to more rounded, and are sometimes covered with red spots. The flowers range from pale yellow to dark red.

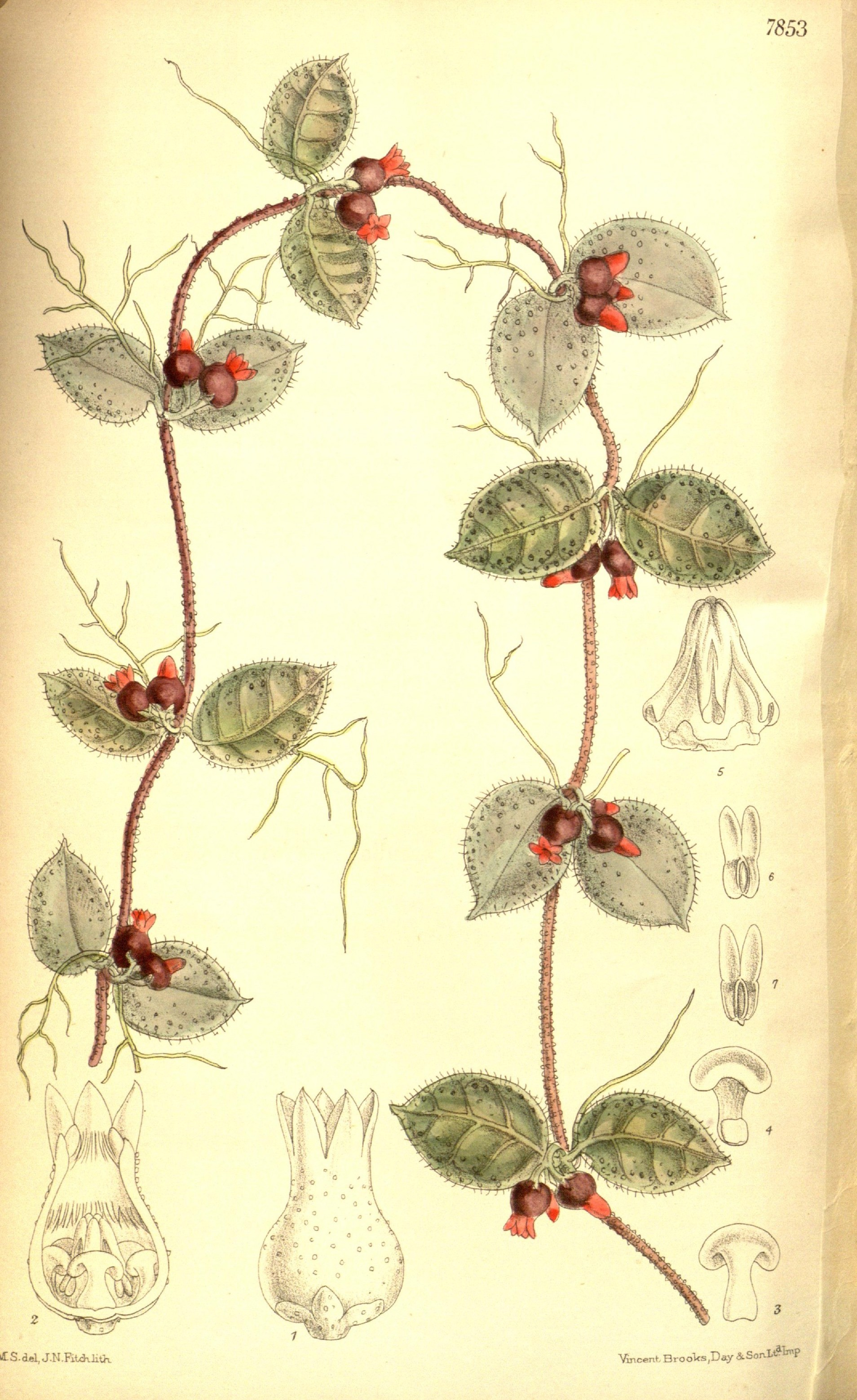
1902 illustration in Curtis's Botanical Magazine,
