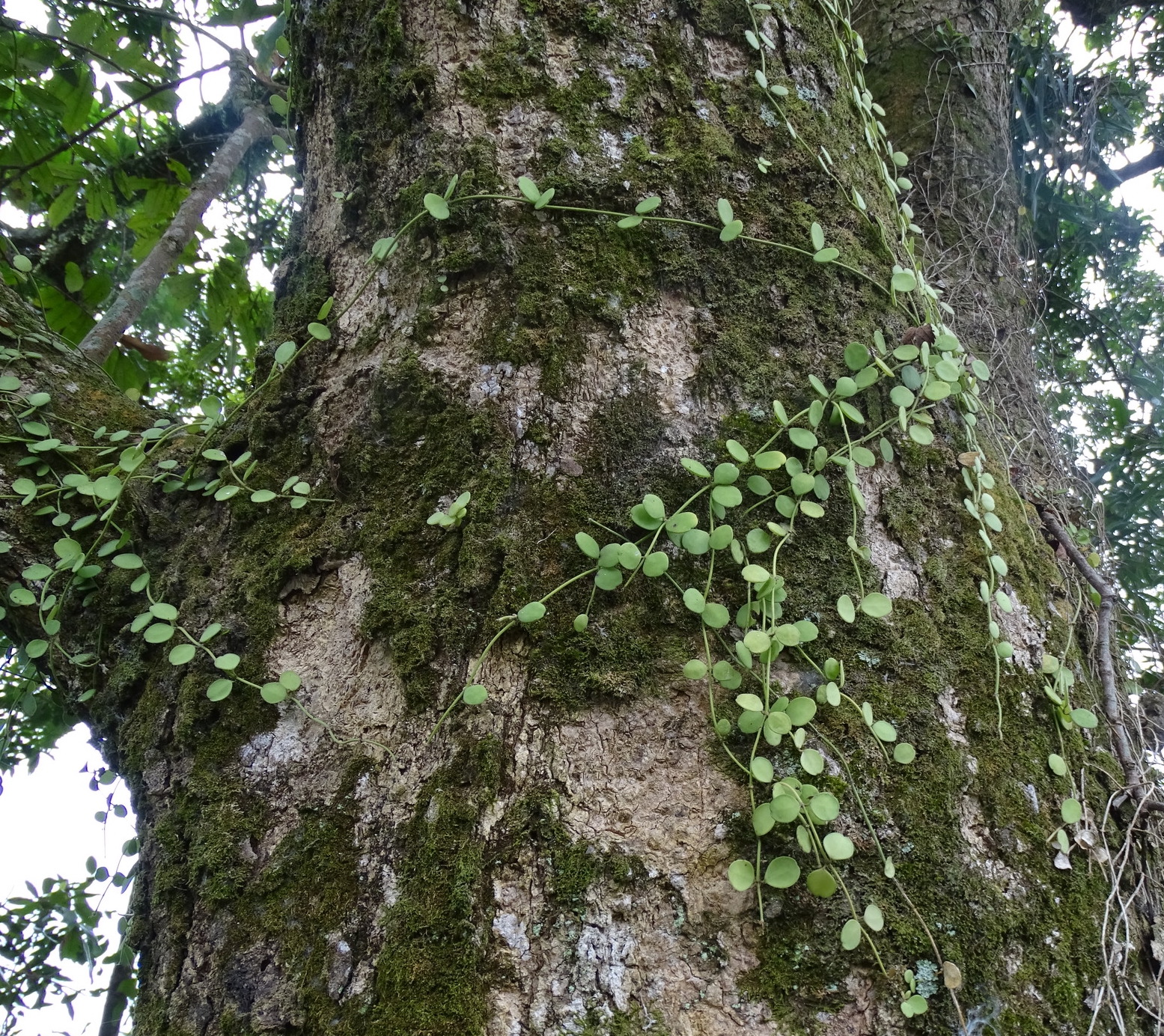

Scientific classification
- Kingdom: Plantae
- Clade: Embryophytes
- Clade: Tracheophytes
- Clade: Spermatophytes
- Clade: Angiosperms
- Clade: Eudicots
- Clade: Asterids
- Order: Gentianales
- Family: Apocynaceae
- Genus: Dischidia
- Species: D. formosana

Binomial name
- Dischidia formosana Maxim.

= Dischidia formosana =

Species of plant

Dischidia formosana is a species of flowering plant in the family Apocynaceae. It is native to Taiwan and the Japanese chain of Ryukyu Islands that stretch southwest from Kyushu to Taiwan. Like other Dischidia it has a climbing growth habit, producing smooth, round leaves and tiny white flowers. Though not particularly rare in Taiwan, the species is on the Japanese Red List as a critically endangered plant.
