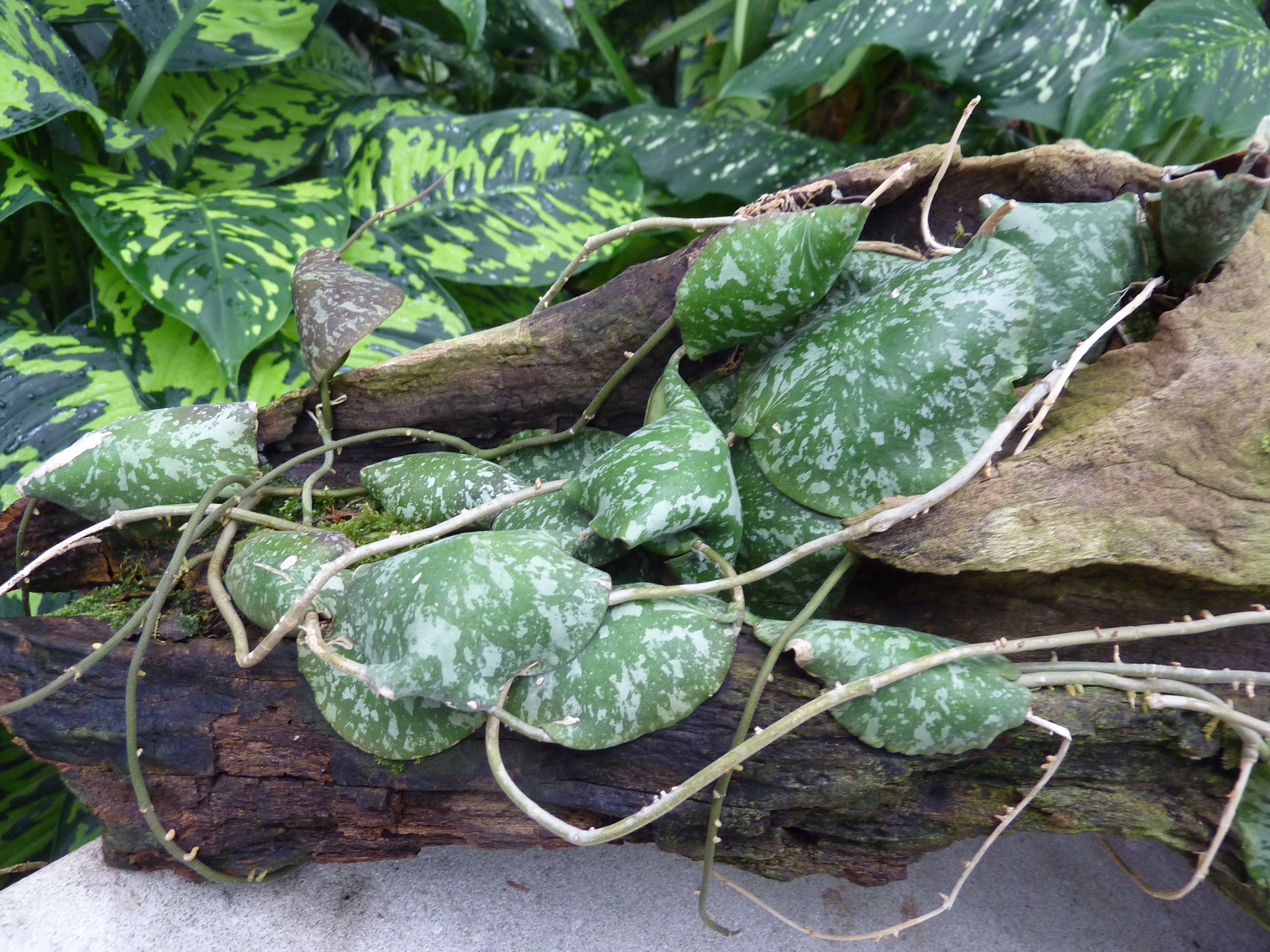

Scientific classification
- Kingdom: Plantae
- Clade: Tracheophytes
- Clade: Angiosperms
- Clade: Eudicots
- Clade: Asterids
- Order: Gentianales
- Family: Apocynaceae
- Genus: Hoya
- Species: H. imbricata

Binomial name
- Hoya imbricata Decne.

= Hoya imbricata =

Species of plant

Hoya imbricata is a species of plant in the genus Hoya native to the Philippines and the Indonesian island of Sulawesi.

== Description ==
The species is unusual for its large, decorative, mottled green and purple dome-shaped leaves of some 25 centimetres (9.8 in) in diameter, which offer shelter to ant colonies.

The succulent leaves are like upturned dinner plates, convex on the outer surface and concave on the inner, hugging the tree-trunk on which the plant grows, and overlapping or imbricate in the fashion of roof tiles. While other species of Hoya and the related genus Dischidia grow in a similar habit, Hoya imbricata is also unusual in having only one leaf per internode.
