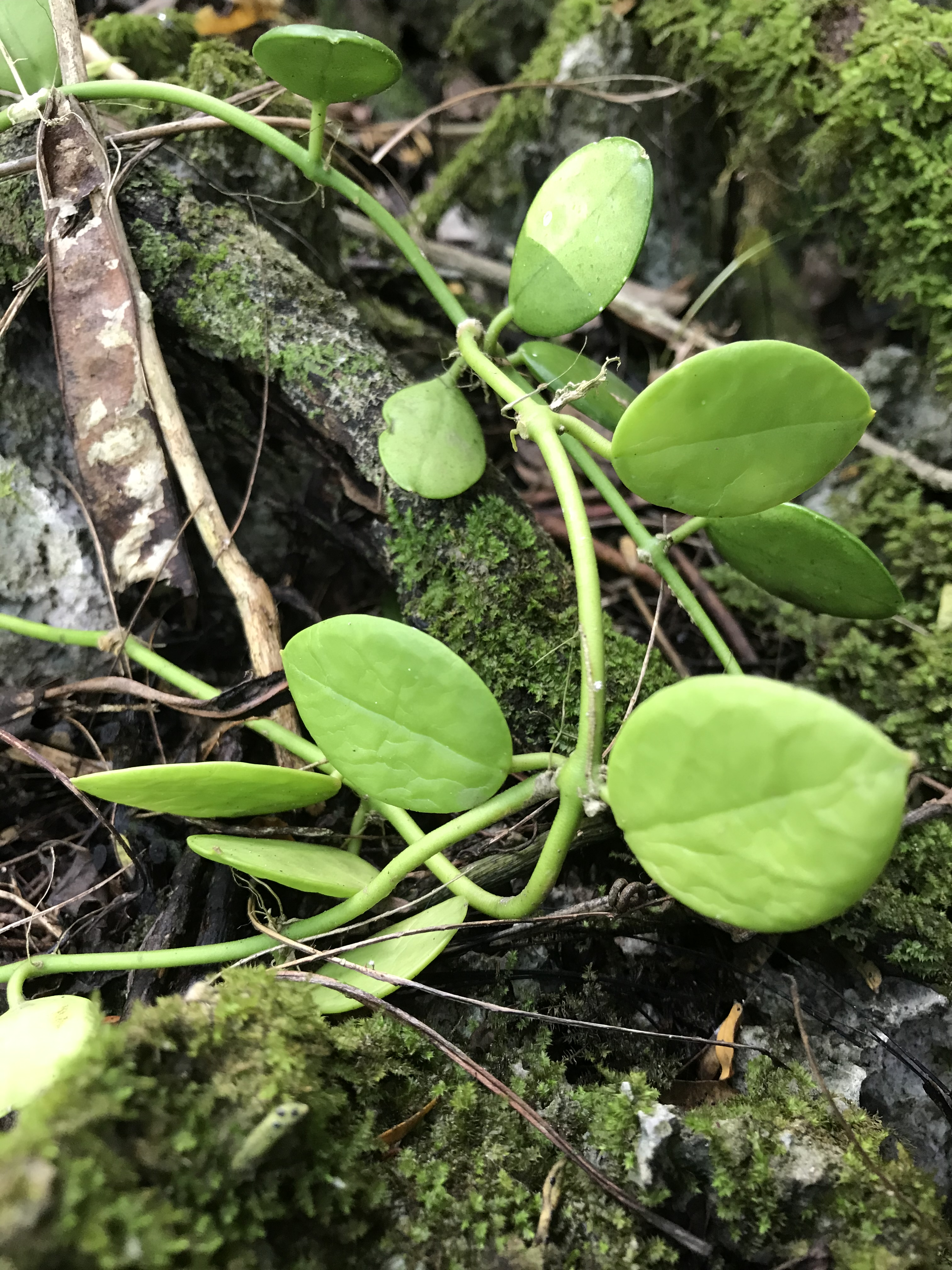

Scientific classification
- Kingdom: Plantae
- Clade: Tracheophytes
- Clade: Angiosperms
- Clade: Eudicots
- Clade: Asterids
- Order: Gentianales
- Family: Apocynaceae
- Genus: Dischidia
- Species: D. puberula

Binomial name
- Dischidia puberula Decne.

= Dischidia puberula =

Species of plant of the Pacific islands

Dischidia puberula is a climbing epiphytic subshrub in the Asclepiadaceae (milkweed) family that is endemic to the Mariana Islands of Guam, Rota and Saipan. There is no known common name.

== History ==
Dischidia puberula was first collected for scientific analysis by French botanist Charles Gaudichaud-Beaupré during the Freycinet expedition to the Mariana Islands in 1819. Gaudichaud mentioned in his botanical survey an unnamed Dischidia species growing up trees on Guam, although he recorded no indigenous name for the plant. Gaudichaud's specimens are housed in the Geneva Herbarium and the holotype is in Paris. Gaudichaud may have mistaken the plant for Dischidia bengalensis. In 1844, the Swiss botanist Augustin Pyramus de Candolle first described the species in the scientific literature based on the specimen from Paris and provided the name of French botanist Joseph Decaisne as the authority.

== Description ==
Detailed descriptions of the species have been made by de Candolle, Safford, and Fosberg. Dischidia puberula as a yellow-green creeper festooning tree trunks, including coconut. Upper branches spread and hang from their host. Stems are warty with soft hairs and rooting at nodes. Leaves are connected in an opposite arrangement on the stem by a short petiole (1-2.2 cm). Leaves are thick, fleshy, and oval-elliptic with acute angle at the tip. Flowers are on a very short peduncle in 2s or 3s; flowers are small, urn-shaped, fleshy, pilose, somewhat glaucous, yellowish or greenish yellow, with a pale orange corolla below, and yellowish lobes within. De Candolle, in the original description, described flowers having 2 or 3 petals, whereas William Safford noted petals and calyxes of 5, with obtuse divisions. Stamens of 5 are connate. Anthers have a membranous tip with 1 pollen mass in each cell. Pendulous coronal processes are adnate to the stamens, erect, and split above. De Candolle found the corolla to be similar to the Southeast Asian Dischidia punctata, but with Dischidia puberula having hairs. Stone (1970) commented that the fruits had never been observed, although Shiokemuri has posted images of the elongated spike-like fruit of Dischidia puberula from 2019. The plant exudes copious milky sap, consistent with other milkweeds. Merrill (1914) and Glassman (1949) make only passing reference to the plant, and it was not mentioned in Costion's checklist of Micronesian endemic plants.

Leaf tissue from preserved specimens was sampled for chemical analysis by Eliot Smith and Edward Straw in 2023.

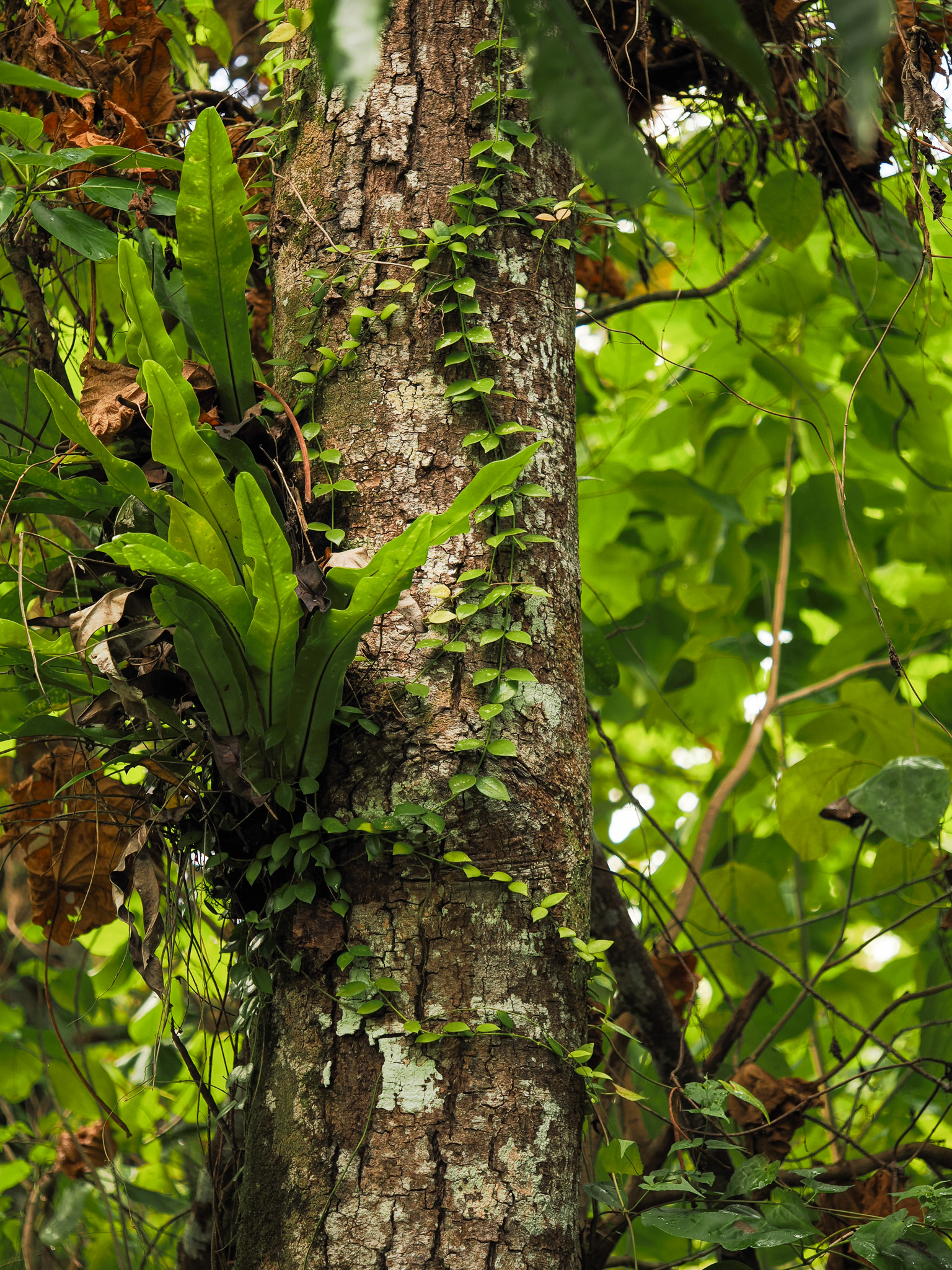
Epiphytic habit of Dischidia puberula with roots secured to host tree (Macaranga thompsonii).

== Distribution and conservation status ==
The University of Guam Herbarium records Dischidia puberula as being native to Guam, Rota and Saipan. The species has been observed most commonly on Guam, in both the northern limestone plateau and volcanic south. P. Moore found it to be common in the limestone forests of Guam as of 1980. It has also been observed on Rota, southwest of the Taga Quarry. In 2006, Tatyana Livshultz from the Arnold Arboretum at Harvard University identified two herbarium specimens collected from Vonikoro (Solomon Island) as Dischidia puberula (rather than the Solomon Island endemic Dischidia cominsii); the flowers from these specimens were described as red with yellow petal tips, or pink petals with white tips. However, as of 2025, Plants of the World Online still lists Dischidia puberula as being endemic only to the Mariana Islands. The IUCN has not yet assessed the species for conservation status.

== Gallery ==
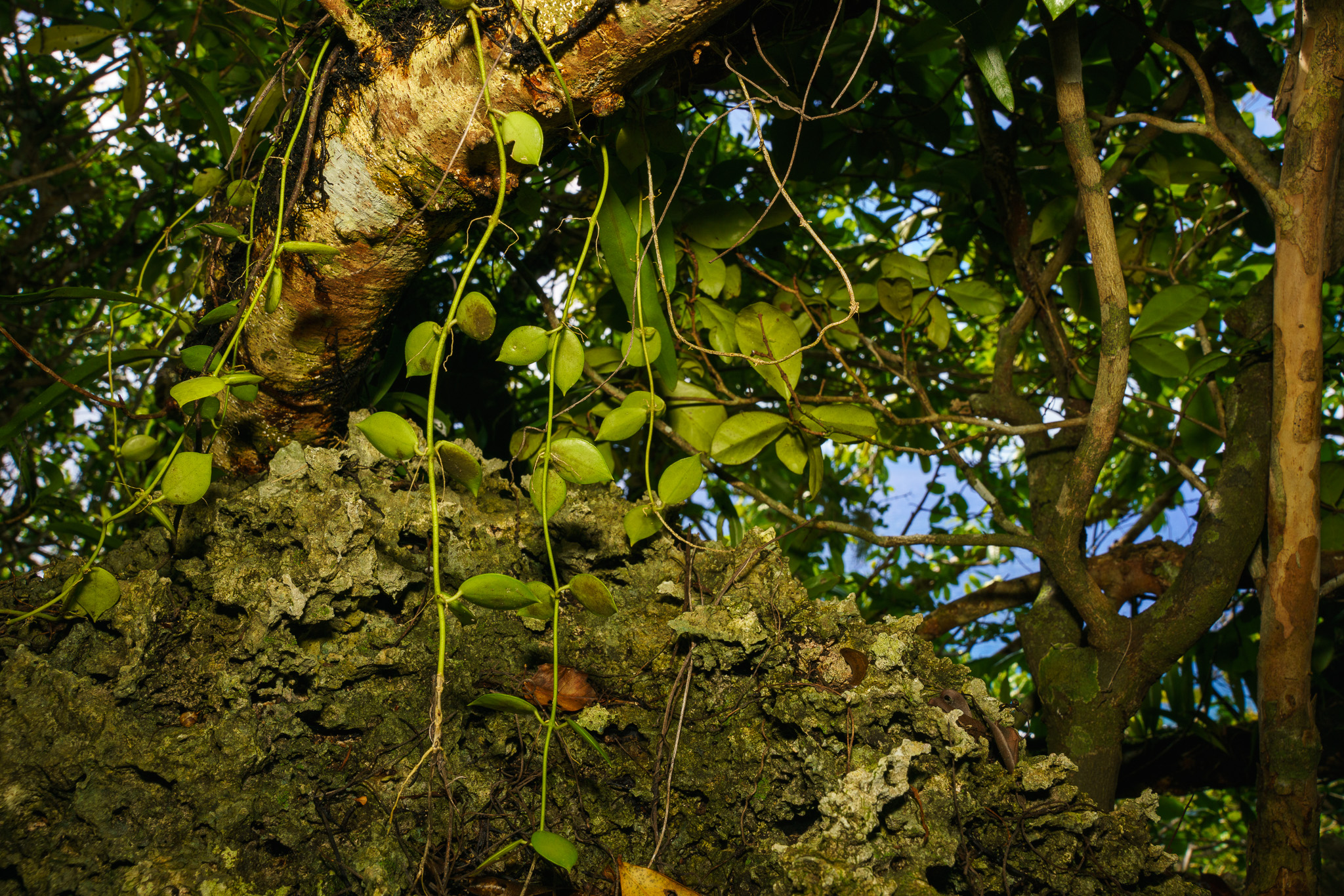
Epiphytic growth habit of Dischidia puberula observed in northern Guam.

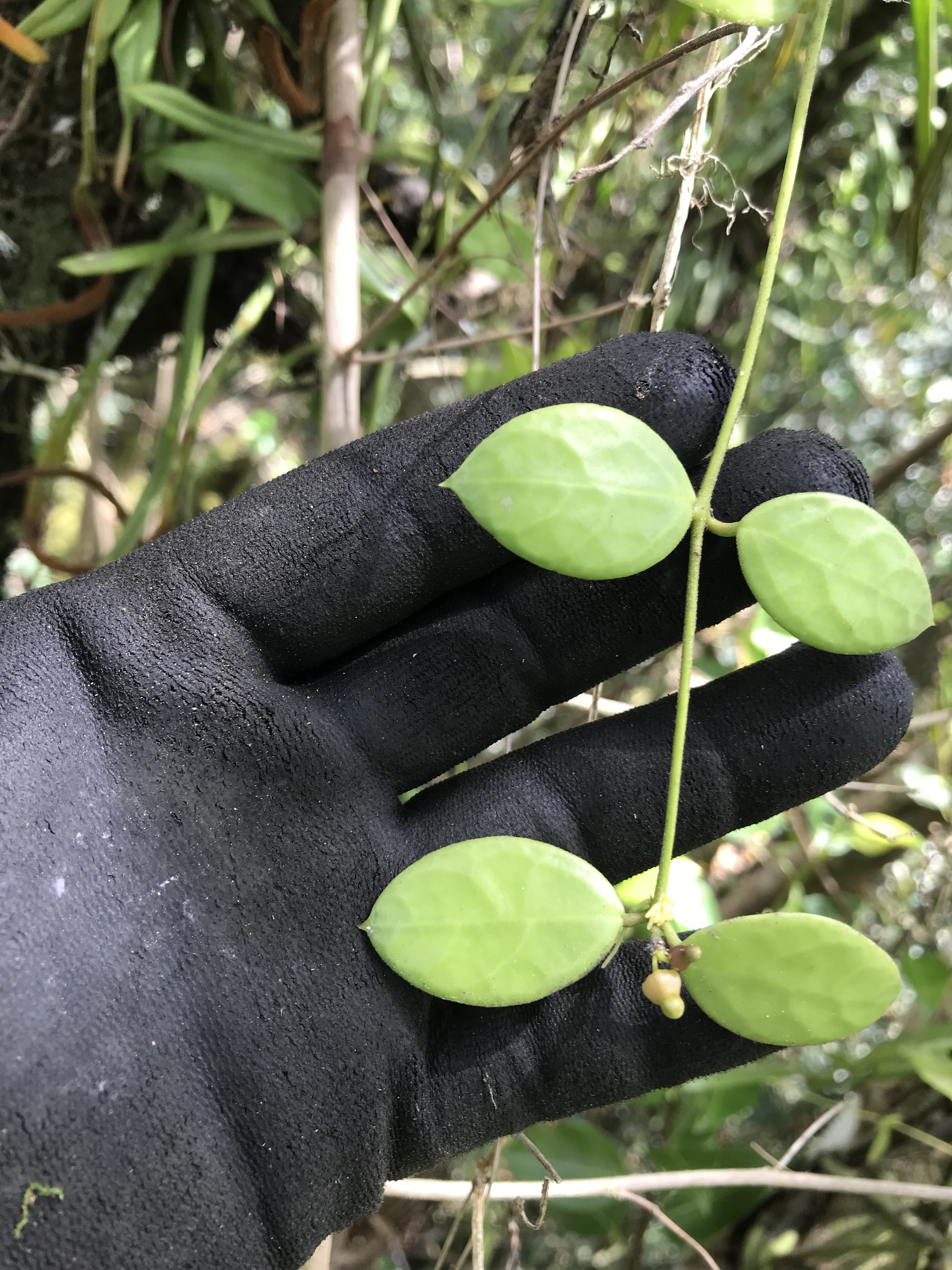
Opposite leaf arrangement. Guam.

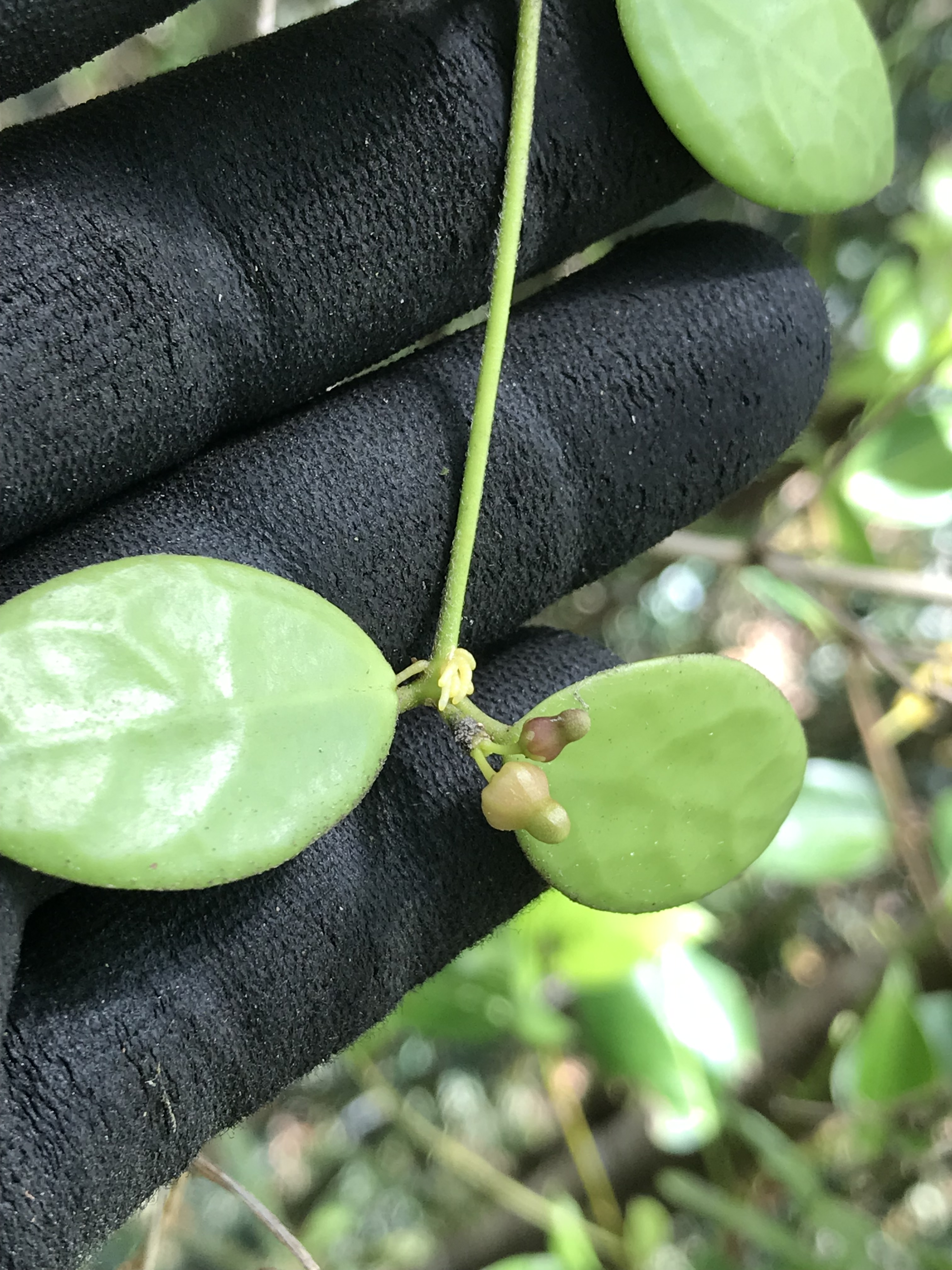
Flower buds of Dischidia puberula. Guam.

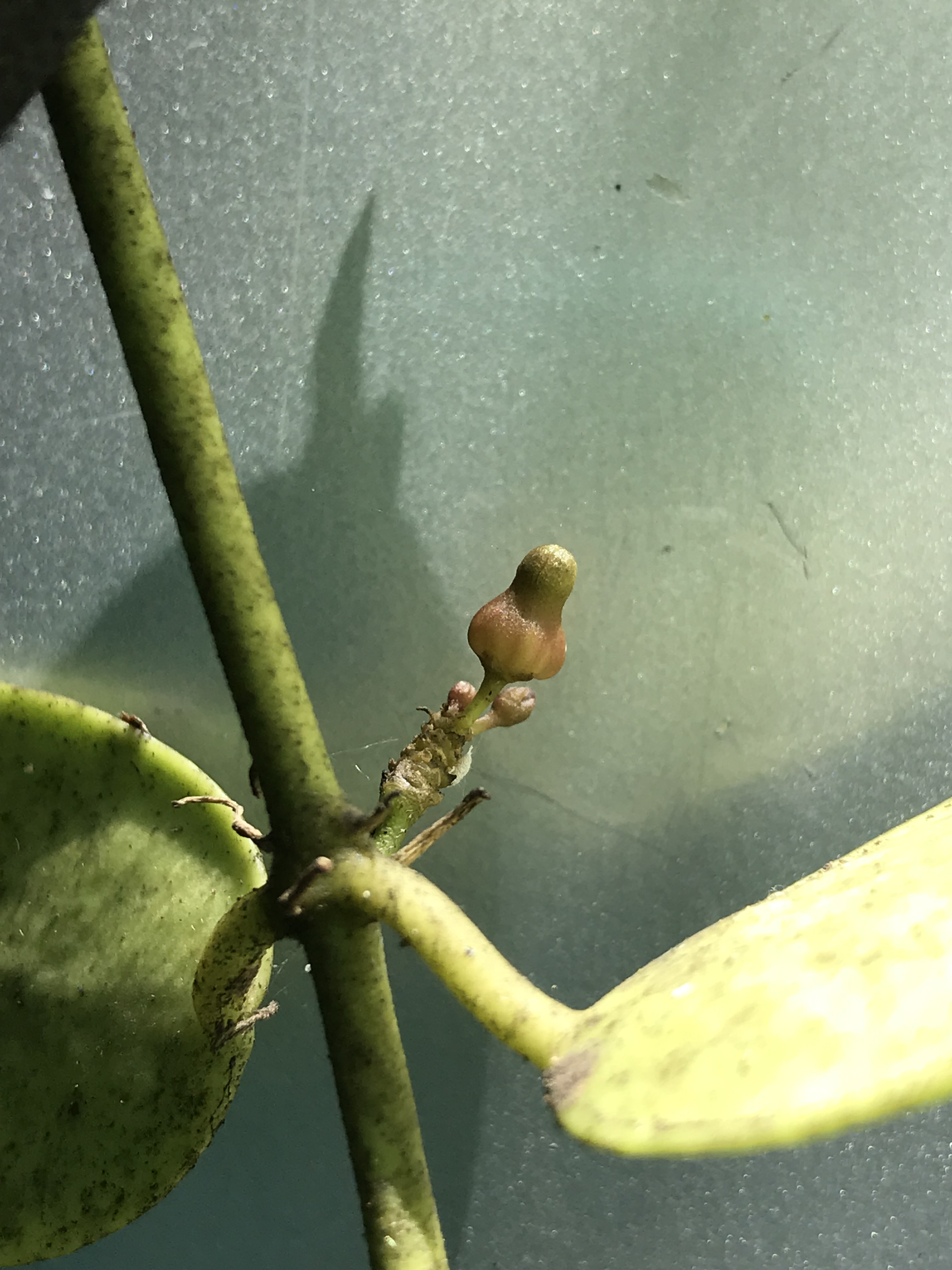
Flower buds. Guam

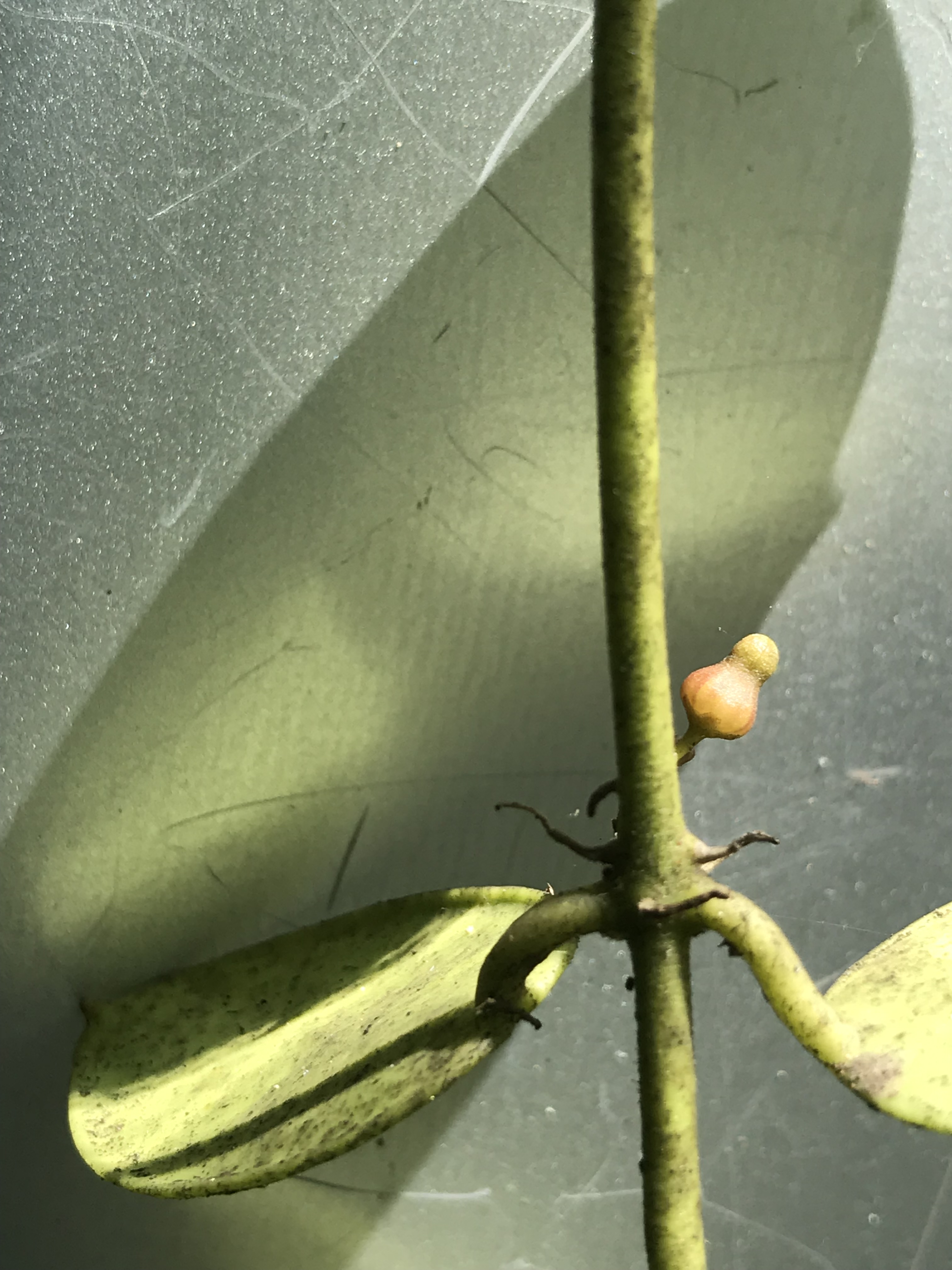
Flower bud of Dischidia puberula and roots from node. Guam

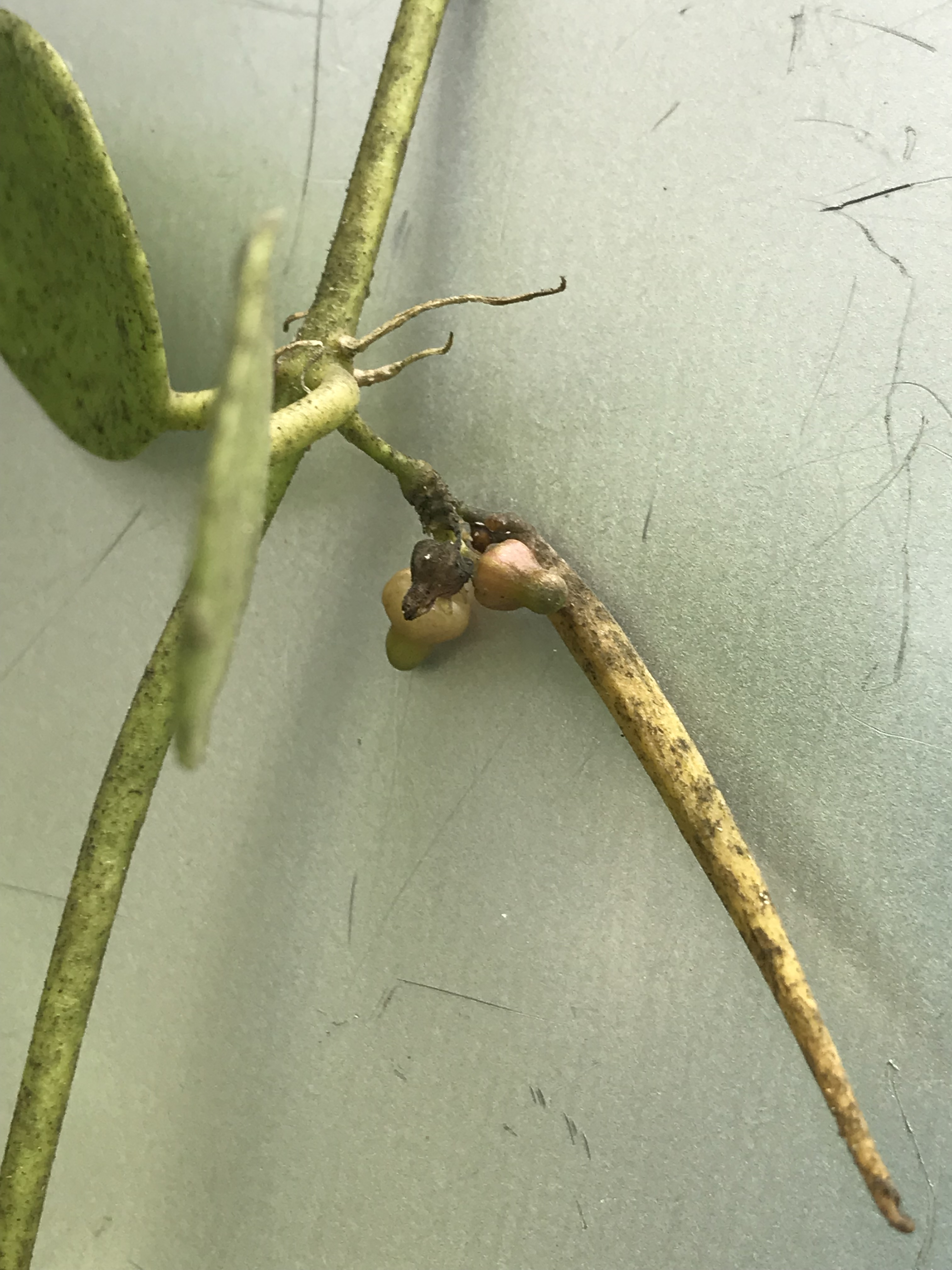
Flower buds and mature seed pod (elongated brown spike) of Dischidia puberula. Guam.
