= Dischidia tonkinensis =

Scientific classification
- Kingdom: Plantae
- Clade: Embryophytes
- Clade: Tracheophytes
- Clade: Spermatophytes
- Clade: Angiosperms
- Clade: Eudicots
- Clade: Asterids
- Order: Gentianales
- Family: Apocynaceae
- Genus: Dischidia
- Species: D. tonkinensis

Binomial name
- Dischidia tonkinensis Costantin

Synonyms
- Dischidia esquirolii (H.Lév.) Tsiang

Species of plant

Dischidia tonkinensis is an epiphytic plant in the genus Dischidia. It is distributed mainly in the south China provinces of Yunnan, Guangxi, and Guizhou, at altitudes of 300 to 1,200 m above sea level. It normally grows in mountain forests and on rocks. Dischidia esquirolii is a synonym. It has not been cultivated.

The whole plant is used in Chinese medicine to relieve skin itching, to treat eye disease, and to cure furuncle and acariasis.
