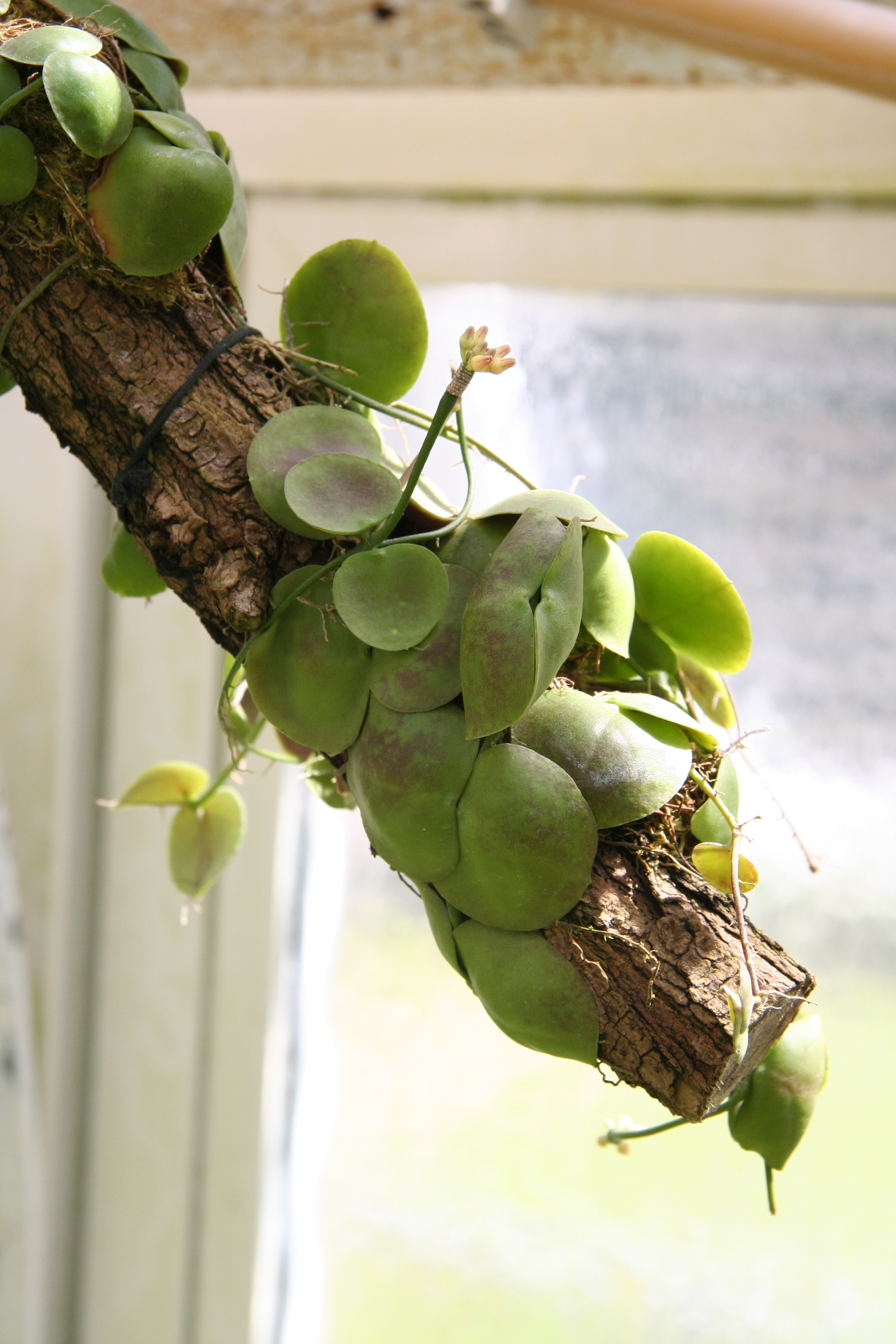
- D. imbricata. at the Berlin Botanical Garden and Botanical Museum

Scientific classification
- Kingdom: Plantae
- Clade: Tracheophytes
- Clade: Angiosperms
- Clade: Eudicots
- Clade: Asterids
- Order: Gentianales
- Family: Apocynaceae
- Genus: Dischidia
- Species: D. imbricata

Binomial name
- Dischidia imbricata Blume

Synonyms
- Dischidia depressa

= Dischidia imbricata =

Species of plant

Dischidia imbricata is a plant in the genus Dischidia native to Southeast Asia from Vietnam to Borneo and Java. Like Hoya imbricata, Dischidia imbricata is a shingling plant that, as it grows epiphytically, clings closely to the host plant and may even have leaves that are completely flat like roof shingles.
