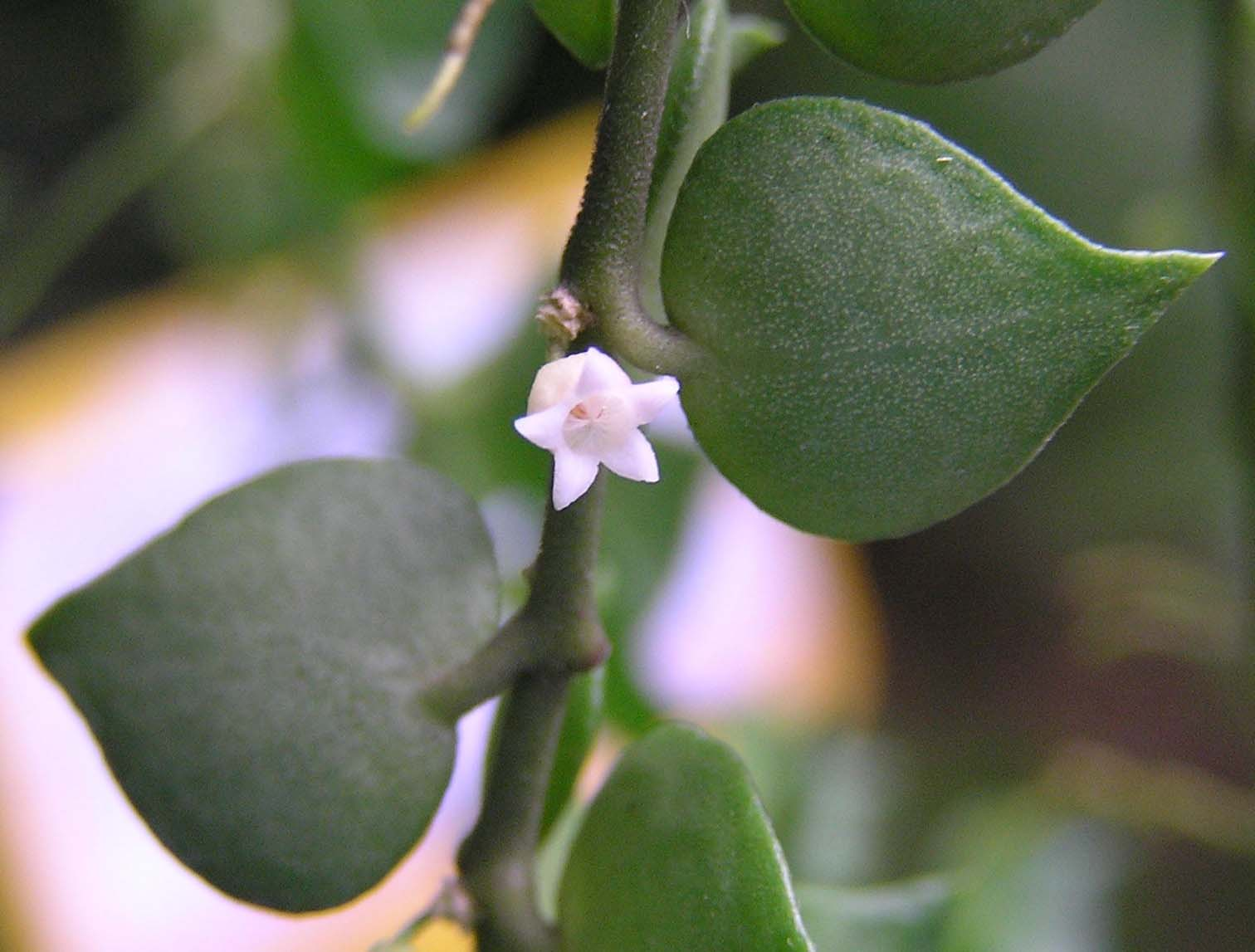
- Dischidia ruscifolia at the Hong Kong Zoological and Botanical Gardens

Scientific classification
- Kingdom: Plantae
- Clade: Tracheophytes
- Clade: Angiosperms
- Clade: Eudicots
- Clade: Asterids
- Order: Gentianales
- Family: Apocynaceae
- Genus: Dischidia
- Species: D. ruscifolia

Binomial name
- Dischidia ruscifolia Decne. ex Becc.

Synonyms
- Dischidia myrtillus Schltr.

= Dischidia ruscifolia =

Species of plant

Dischidia ruscifolia, also known as million hearts, is an epiphytic plant native to the Philippines.

== Description ==
This decorative plant comprises stiff, slender green shoots that grow to 3.3 feet in length before taking root at the tip and continuing, which are densely decorated in pairs of stiff, succulent, heart-shaped leaves; hence the name "Million Hearts". Many tiny white flowers appear on the internodes and remain for long periods of time. The plant looks graceful in a hanging pot, but is found in dense clumps and clusters on overhead tree branches in its habitat.

== Cultivation ==
Dischidia ruscifolia is very easily propagated from cuttings and will survive a wide range of treatment from a gardener.
