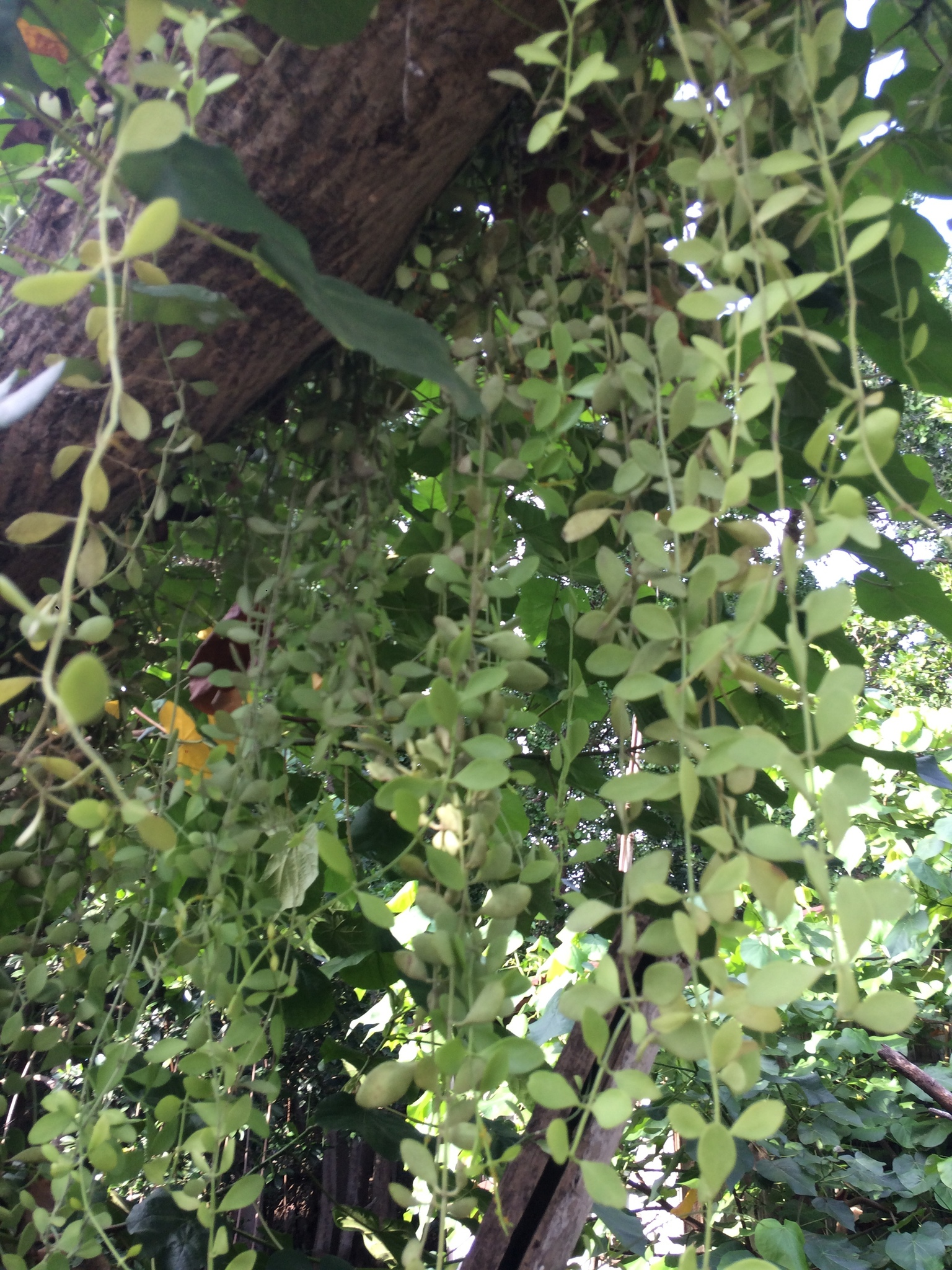

Scientific classification
- Kingdom: Plantae
- Clade: Tracheophytes
- Clade: Angiosperms
- Clade: Eudicots
- Clade: Asterids
- Order: Gentianales
- Family: Apocynaceae
- Genus: Dischidia
- Species: D. oiantha

Binomial name
- Dischidia oiantha Schltr.

= Dischidia oiantha =

Species of plant

Dischidia oiantha is an epiphytic climbing plant in the genus Dischidia native to the Philippines. The foliage of this species is elliptic and has a pendant growth habit. There is also a variety with a variegated leaf margin.
