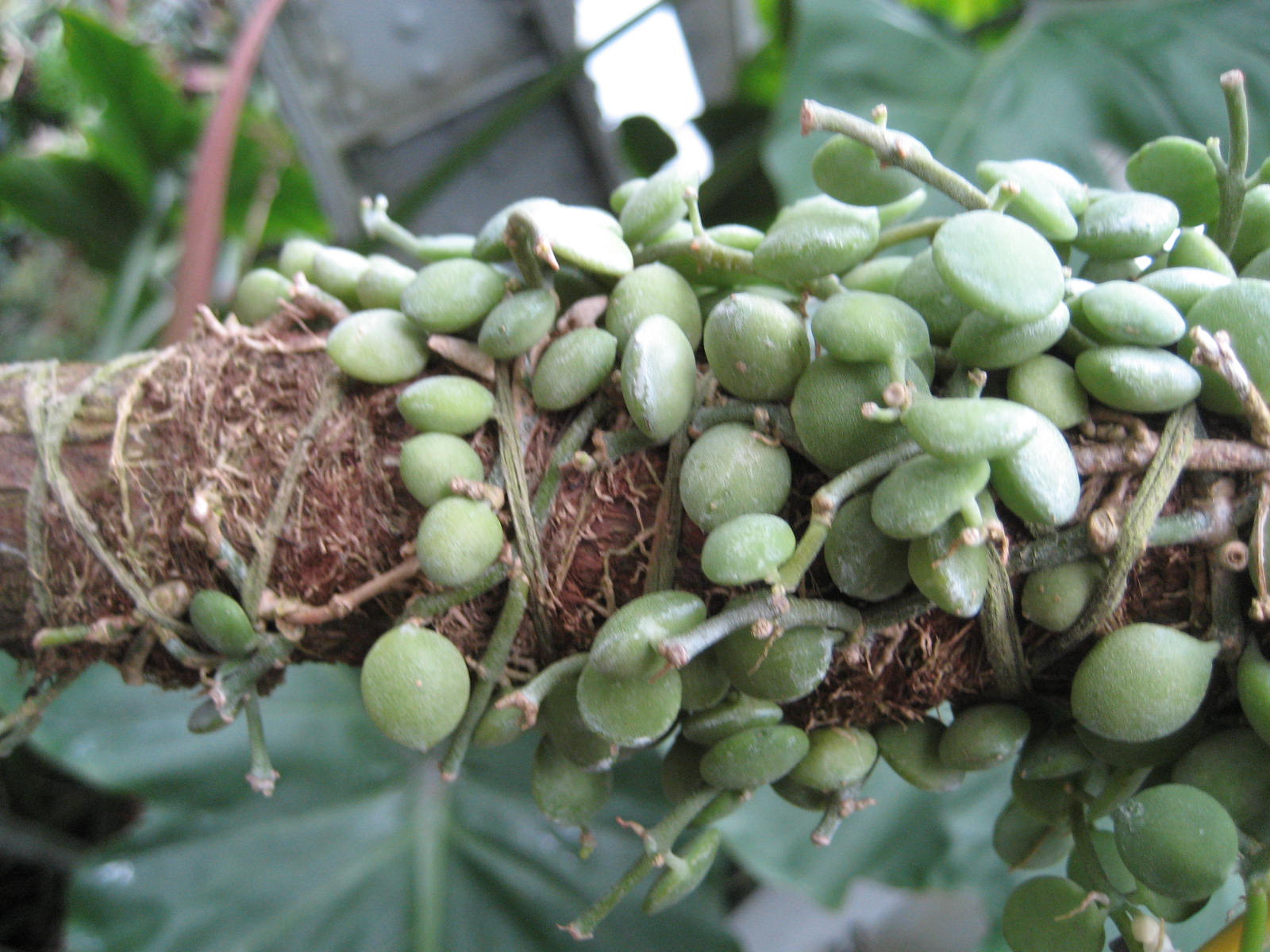
- Dischidia nummularia growing on a tree trunk

Scientific classification
- Kingdom: Plantae
- Clade: Tracheophytes
- Clade: Angiosperms
- Clade: Eudicots
- Clade: Asterids
- Order: Gentianales
- Family: Apocynaceae
- Genus: Dischidia
- Species: D. nummularia

Binomial name
- Dischidia nummularia R.Br.

= Dischidia nummularia =

Species of plant

Dischidia nummularia is an epiphytic climbing plant that belongs to the genus Dischidia. It has tiny, opposite lens-shaped leaves, and is frequently seen on the trunks of trees. In the wild it is found in India, China, Indonesia, Laos, Thailand, Vietnam, Myanmar, Malaysia, and Australia. It is commonly referred to as string-of-nickels or button orchid.

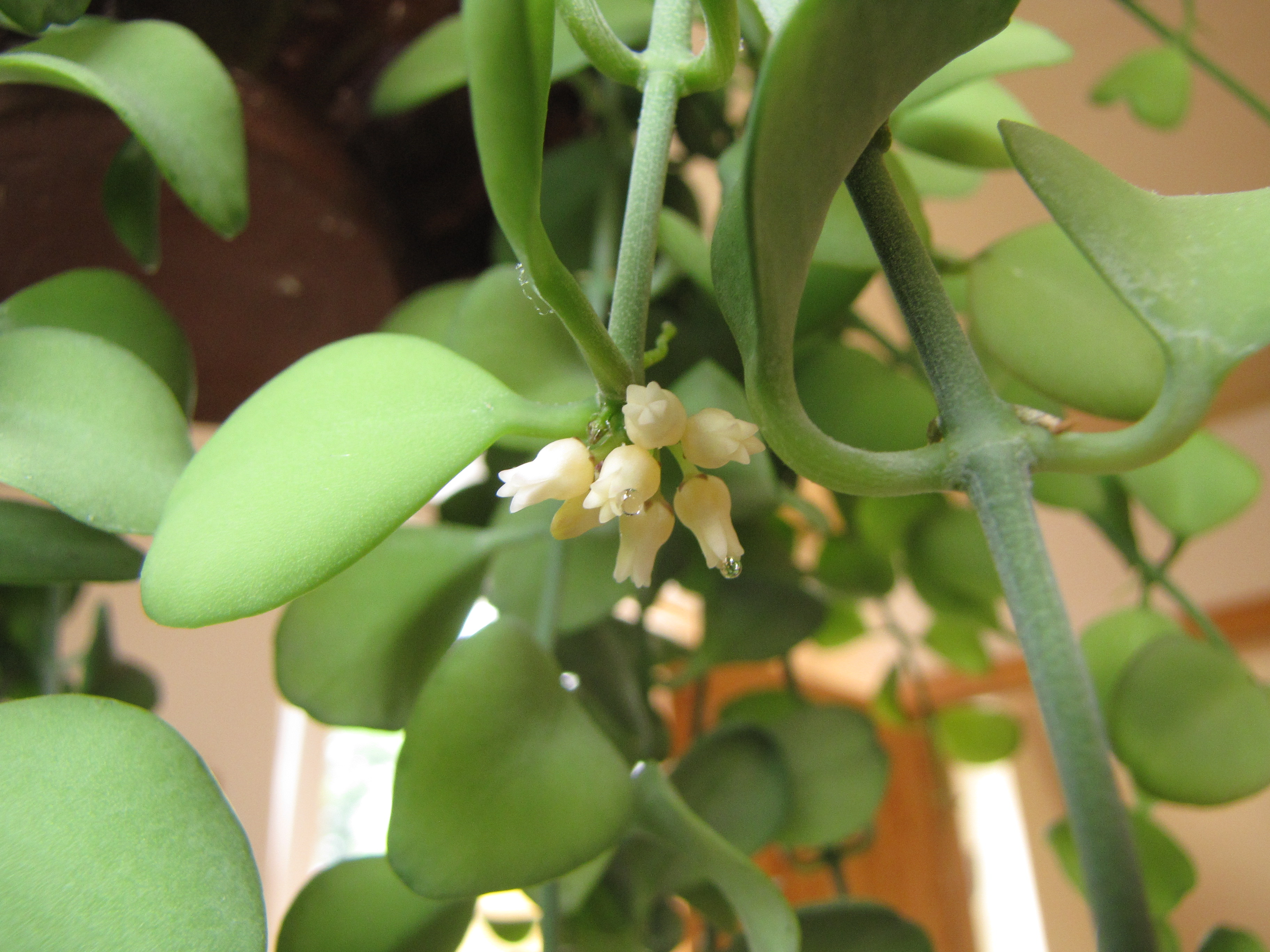
Dischidia nummularia flowers
