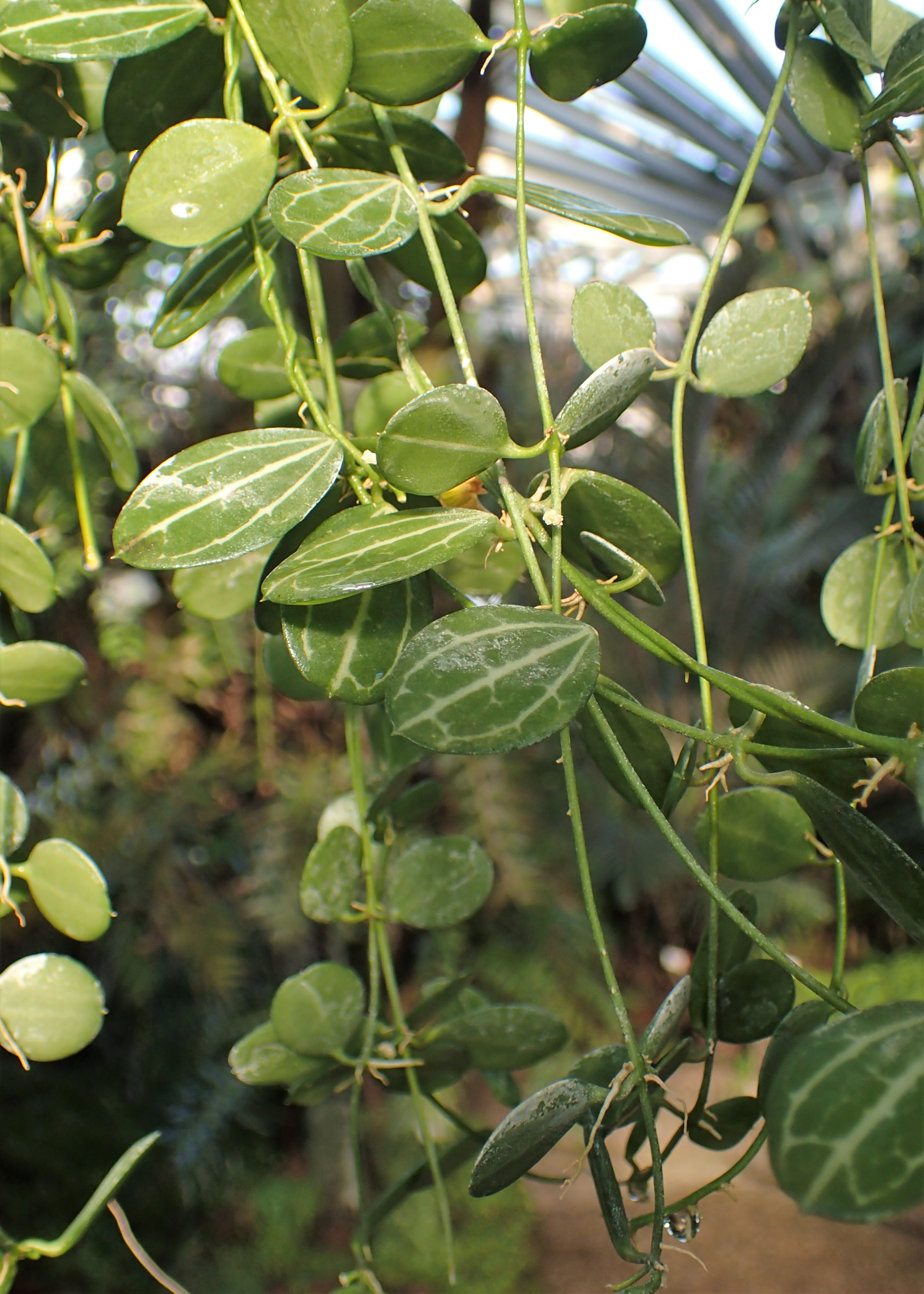
- Cultivated at the Berlin Botanical Garden and Botanical Museum

Conservation status
- Least Concern (NCA)

Scientific classification
- Kingdom: Plantae
- Clade: Embryophytes
- Clade: Tracheophytes
- Clade: Spermatophytes
- Clade: Angiosperms
- Clade: Eudicots
- Clade: Asterids
- Order: Gentianales
- Family: Apocynaceae
- Genus: Dischidia
- Species: D. ovata

Binomial name
- Dischidia ovata Benth.

= Dischidia ovata =

Species of plant

Dischidia ovata, commonly called watermelon dischidia (pronounced /dɪsˈkɪdiə/), is a small vine in the frangipani and hoya family Apocynaceae, native to New Guinea and Cape York Peninsula, Australia. The species name ovata refers to its ovate leaves, its common name refers to the leaf venation that resembles a watermelon rind. The species is succulent and grows as an epiphytic or lithophytic vine in a variety of habitats.

== Taxonomy ==
This species was first described in 1843 by the English botanist George Bentham. His description was based on plant material collected by R.B. Hinds in New Guinea and forwarded to the botanist in England. It was published in the London Journal of Botany
