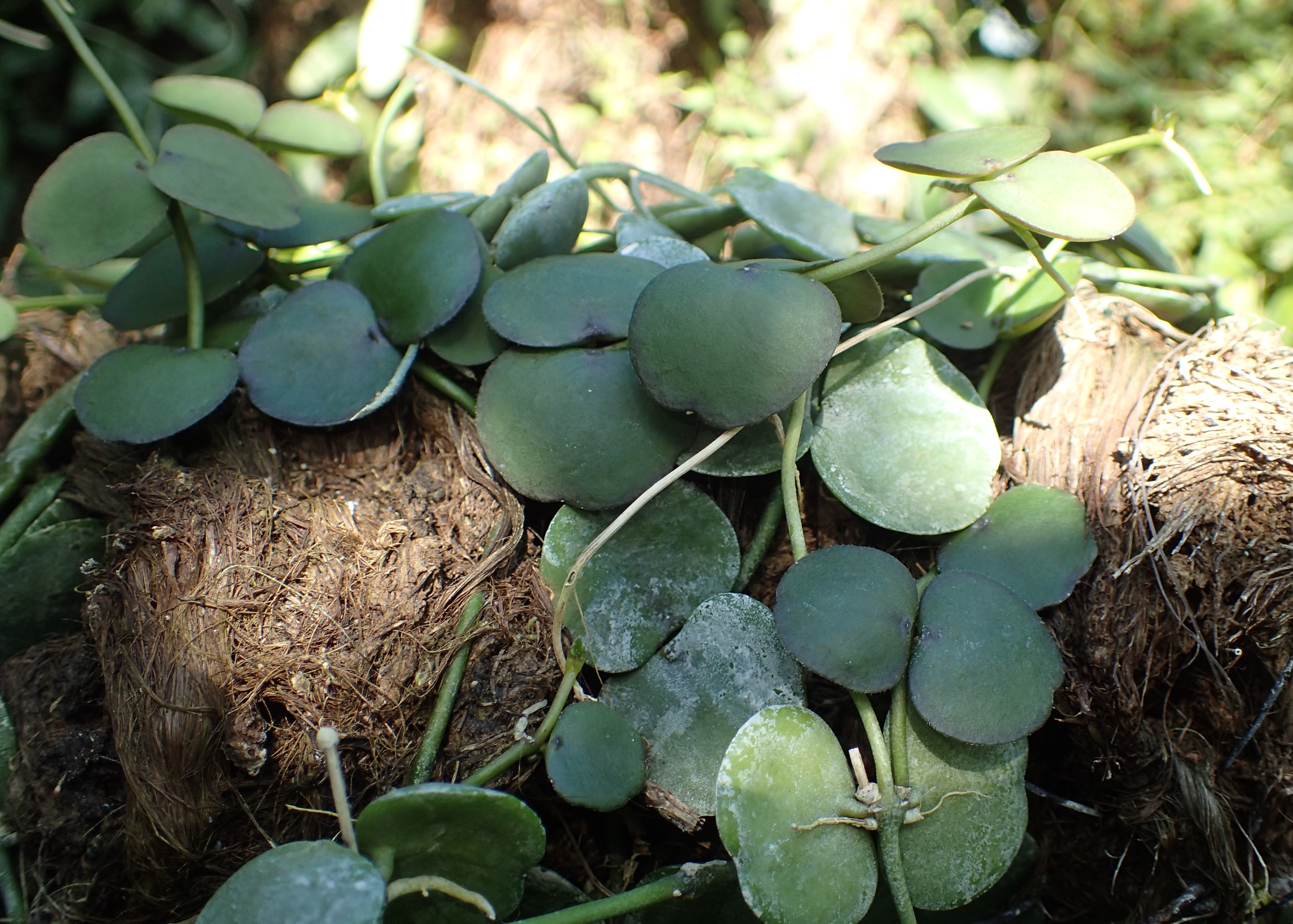
- D. astephana growing in a botanical garden

Scientific classification
- Kingdom: Plantae
- Clade: Tracheophytes
- Clade: Angiosperms
- Clade: Eudicots
- Clade: Asterids
- Order: Gentianales
- Family: Apocynaceae
- Genus: Dischidia
- Species: D. astephana

Binomial name
- Dischidia astephana Scort. ex King & Gamble

Synonyms
- Conchophyllum angulatum Schltr.

= Dischidia astephana =

Species of plant

Dischidia astephana is a species of plant in the genus Dischidia native to Peninsular Malaysia and Borneo. A vining epiphyte that can cover an entire tree branch in dense leaves, it is often found growing near other Dischidia including D. albida, D. parvifolia, and D. vadosa. Its leaves are shaped like flat rings or domes, some of which will be tightly appressed to the surface of the tree where it grows. It lives symbiotically with ants of the Crematogaster genus on trees, with the roots growing inside ant nests and using debris for nutrients.
