= Hoya chinghungensis =

Scientific classification
- Kingdom: Plantae
- Clade: Tracheophytes
- Clade: Angiosperms
- Clade: Eudicots
- Clade: Asterids
- Order: Gentianales
- Family: Apocynaceae
- Genus: Hoya
- Species: H. chinghungensis

Binomial name
- Hoya chinghungensis (Y.Tsiang & P.T.Li) M.G.Gilbert, P.T.Li & W.D.Stevens

Species of plant

Hoya chinghungensis is a species of Hoya native to China and Indo-China.

== See also ==
- List of Hoya species
