= Hoya blashernaezii subsp. valmayoriana =

Scientific classification
- Kingdom: Plantae
- Clade: Tracheophytes
- Clade: Angiosperms
- Clade: Eudicots
- Clade: Asterids
- Order: Gentianales
- Family: Apocynaceae
- Genus: Hoya
- Species: H. blashernaezii
- Subspecies: H. b. subsp. valmayoriana

Trinomial name
- Hoya blashernaezii subsp. valmayoriana (Kloppenb., Guevarra & Carandang) Kloppenb., Guevarra & Carandang

Synonyms
- Hoya valmayoriana Kloppenb., Guevarra & Carandang

Subspecies of plant

Hoya blashernaezii subsp. valmayoriana is a subspecies of porcelainflower or wax plant (genus Hoya) endemic to the Philippines. An asclepiad subspecies of flowering plant in the dogbane family Apocynaceae, it was first described in 2012 by Kloppenburg et al. as Hoya valmayoriana, and in 2014 reduced by the same authors to a subspecies of Hoya blashernaezii. The corolla of its flower is peach-colored. Originally, this species was collected together with seven other hoyas in October 1988 by David M. Cummings (collection number DMC 1622), ¾ kilometer north of Lake Bulusan, Sorsogon Province, the Philippines, in dense forest along the roadside. This was the same location as Hoya davidcummingii.

== Etymology ==
The subspecific epithet in the infraspecific name, valmayoriana, honors Helen Valmayor, a retired professor of the Department of Horticulture, University of the Philippines Los Baños, Laguna, the Philippines.
