= Hoya blashernaezii =

Scientific classification
- Kingdom: Plantae
- Clade: Tracheophytes
- Clade: Angiosperms
- Clade: Eudicots
- Clade: Asterids
- Order: Gentianales
- Family: Apocynaceae
- Subfamily: Asclepiadoideae
- Tribe: Marsdenieae
- Genus: Hoya
- Species: H. blashernaezii

Binomial name
- Hoya blashernaezii Kloppenb.

Species of plant

Hoya blashernaezii is a species of flowering plant in the family Apocynaceae, endemic to the Philippines. It was first described in 1999.

== Taxonomy ==
Hoya blashernaezii was first described by Robert Dale Kloppenburg in 1999.

As of November 2023, Plants of the World Online accepted five subspecies:

- Hoya blashernaezii subsp. aurantiaca Kloppenb. & G.Mend.
- Hoya blashernaezii subsp. blashernaezii
- Hoya blashernaezii subsp. siariae (Kloppenb.) Kloppenb.
- Hoya blashernaezii subsp. truncata Kloppenb. & G.Mend.
- Hoya blashernaezii subsp. valmayoriana (Kloppenb., Guevarra & Carandang) Kloppenb., Guevarra & Carandang

Hoya blashernaezii subsp. valmayoriana was first described in 2012 as the species Hoya valmayoriana. In 2014, the same authors reduced it to a subspecies of Hoya blashernaezii.
