= List of Anthurium species =

This is a list of Anthurium species, a superdiverse genus of flowering plants from the arum family (Araceae). There are known to be at least 1,000 described species.

== A ==
- Anthurium abajoense Croat & Zuluaga
- Anthurium acanthospadix Croat & Oberle
- Anthurium acaule (Jacq.) Schott
- Anthurium acebeyae Croat
- Anthurium achupallense Croat
- Anthurium aciculare Croat
- Anthurium aciforme Croat & Delannay
- Anthurium acutangulum Engl.
- Anthurium acutibacca Croat & M.M.Mora
- Anthurium acutifolium Engl.
- Anthurium acutissimum Engl.
- Anthurium acutum N.E.Br.
- Anthurium aduncum Schott
- Anthurium affine Schott
- Anthurium agnatum Schott
- Anthurium alatipedunculatum Croat & R.A.Baker
- Anthurium alatum Engl.
- Anthurium albertiae Croat & D.C.Bay
- Anthurium albidum Sodiro
- Anthurium albispadix (Croat & J.Rodr.) Croat & O.Ortiz
- Anthurium albispatha Sodiro
- Anthurium albovirescens Sodiro
- Anthurium alcatrazense Nadruz & Cath.
- Anthurium alcogolloi Croat
- Anthurium alegriasense Engl.
- Anthurium alfaroi Croat
- Anthurium algentryi Croat
- Anthurium alluriquinense Croat
- Anthurium alstonii Croat
- Anthurium altaverapazense Croat & Hormell
- Anthurium alticola Croat
- Anthurium altobueyense Croat
- Anthurium alturaense Croat
- Anthurium alvinii Croat & O.Ortiz
- Anthurium amargalense Croat & M.M.Mora
- Anthurium ameliae Nadruz & Cath.
- Anthurium amistadense Croat
- Anthurium amnicola Dressler
- Anthurium amoenum Kunth & C.D.Bouché
- Anthurium anceps Sodiro
- Anthurium anchicayense Croat
- Anthurium ancuashii Croat & Carlsen
- Anthurium andicola Liebm.
- Anthurium andinum Engl.
- Anthurium andraeanum Linden ex André
- Anthurium andreslovinense Matuda
- Anthurium angelopolisense Croat
- Anthurium angosturense Engl.
- Anthurium angustatum (Kunth) Kunth
- Anthurium angustifolium Theófilo & Sakur.
- Anthurium angustilaminatum Engl.
- Anthurium angustilobum Croat
- Anthurium angustisectum Engl.
- Anthurium angustispadix Croat & R.A.Baker
- Anthurium annularum O.Ortiz, Croat & Baldini
- Anthurium anorianum Croat
- Anthurium antioquiense Engl.
- Anthurium antonioanum Croat
- Anthurium antrophyoides Killip
- Anthurium apanui Croat
- Anthurium apaporanum R.E.Schult.
- Anthurium apiaense Croat
- Anthurium arandae Croat & O.Ortiz
- Anthurium arbelaezii Croat
- Anthurium archilae Croat
- Anthurium arcuatum (Croat) O.Ortiz & Croat
- Anthurium arenasense Croat & D.C.Bay
- Anthurium Argyrophyllum, Nadruz, Magno & Theófilo
- Anthurium argyrostachyum Sodiro
- Anthurium aripoense N.E.Br.
- Anthurium arisaemoides Madison
- Anthurium aristatum Sodiro
- Anthurium armbrusteri Croat
- Anthurium armeniense Croat
- Anthurium aroense G.S.Bunting
- Anthurium aromoense Croat
- Anthurium arusiense Croat & M.M.Mora
- Anthurium asplundii Croat
- Anthurium atamainii Croat
- Anthurium atramentarium Croat & Oberle
- Anthurium atroguttatum Croat
- Anthurium atropurpureum R.E.Schult. & Maguire
- Anthurium atrovinosum Temponi, Hammes & Nadruz
- Anthurium atroviride Sodiro
- Anthurium augustinum K.Koch & Lauche
- Anthurium aureum Engl.
- Anthurium auritum Sodiro
- Anthurium austin-smithii Croat & R.A.Baker
- Anthurium aylwardianum Croat

== B ==
- Anthurium baguense Croat
- Anthurium bakeri Hook.f.
- Anthurium balaoanum Engl.
- Anthurium baldinii Croat & O.Ortiz
- Anthurium balslevii Croat & J.Rodr.
- Anthurium banderasense Croat
- Anthurium bantanum Croat & J.Deal
- Anthurium barbacoasense Engl.
- Anthurium barclayanum Engl.
- Anthurium barreranum Croat & D.C.Bay
- Anthurium barrieri Croat, Scherber. & G.Ferry
- Anthurium barryi Croat
- Anthurium basirotundum Croat
- Anthurium batistae Croat, O.Ortiz & Baldini
- Anthurium bayae Croat
- Anthurium becerrae Croat
- Anthurium beckii Croat & Acebey
- Anthurium bellum Schott
- Anthurium beltianum Standl. & L.O.Williams
- Anthurium benavidesiae Croat
- Anthurium benktsparrei Croat
- Anthurium bernalii Croat
- Anthurium bernardii Croat
- Anthurium berriozabalense Matuda
- Anthurium berryi G.S.Bunting
- Anthurium besseae Croat
- Anthurium betanianum Croat
- Anthurium betsyae Croat
- Anthurium bicordoense Croat
- Anthurium bimarginatum Sodiro
- Anthurium binotii Linden ex Regel
- Anthurium birdseyanum Croat
- Anthurium bittneri Grayum
- Anthurium blanquitense Croat
- Anthurium bocainense Cath. & Nadruz
- Anthurium boekei Croat
- Anthurium bogneri Croat
- Anthurium bogotense Schott
- Anthurium bonplandii G.S.Bunting
- Anthurium boosianum Croat & G.Ferry
- Anthurium boudetii Nadruz
- Anthurium boylei Croat
- Anthurium brachypodum Sodiro
- Anthurium bradeanum Croat & Grayum
- Anthurium bragae Nadruz
- Anthurium bredemeyeri Schott
- Anthurium brenesii Croat & R.A.Baker
- Anthurium brent-berlinii Croat
- Anthurium breviapiculum Croat
- Anthurium brevipedunculatum Madison
- Anthurium brevipes Sodiro
- Anthurium breviscapum Kunth
- Anthurium brevispadix Croat
- Anthurium brigadeiroense Nadruz, Hammes & Temponi
- Anthurium brittonianum Sodiro
- Anthurium bromelicola Mayo & L.P.Félix
- Anthurium brownii Mast.
- Anthurium bruxellense Croat
- Anthurium bucayanum Croat
- Anthurium buchtienii K.Krause
- Anthurium buganum Engl.
- Anthurium bullianum Engl.
- Anthurium bullosum Sodiro
- Anthurium burgeri Croat & R.A.Baker
- Anthurium bushii Croat
- Anthurium bustamanteae Croat, E.Freire, Bleiweiss & Sorn.Mol.

== C ==
- Anthurium cabrerense Engl.
- Anthurium cabuyalense Croat & J.Rodr.
- Anthurium cachabianum Sodiro
- Anthurium cachoeirense Theófilo & Sakur.
- Anthurium cainarachense Engl.
- Anthurium caldodsonii Croat
- Anthurium calimense Croat & D.C.Bay
- Anthurium callejasii Croat
- Anthurium caloveboranum Croat
- Anthurium campii Croat
- Anthurium camposii Sodiro
- Anthurium canaliculatum Sodiro
- Anthurium candolleanum Sodiro
- Anthurium caparaoense Temponi, Camelo & Nadruz
- Anthurium caperatum Croat & R.A.Baker
- Anthurium caraboboense Croat
- Anthurium caramantae Engl.
- Anthurium carchiense Croat
- Anthurium cardenasii Croat
- Anthurium carinatum Engl.
- Anthurium caripense G.S.Bunting
- Anthurium carlablackiae Croat & O.Ortiz
- Anthurium carmenense Croat
- Anthurium carneospadix Engl.
- Anthurium carnosum Croat & R.A.Baker
- Anthurium carpishense Croat
- Anthurium carrasquillanum Croat & O.Ortiz
- Anthurium cartiense Croat
- Anthurium cartilagineum (Desf.) Kunth
- Anthurium cascajalense Croat
- Anthurium castillomontii Croat, Vannini & Hormell
- Anthurium cataniapoense Croat
- Anthurium caucanum Engl.
- Anthurium caucavallense Croat
- Anthurium caulorrhizum Sodiro
- Anthurium ceratiinum Diels
- Anthurium ceronii Croat
- Anthurium cerrateae Croat & Lingán
- Anthurium cerrobaulense Matuda
- Anthurium cerrocampanense Croat
- Anthurium cerrofrioense Croat & O.Ortiz
- Anthurium cerropelonense Matuda
- Anthurium cerropirrense Croat
- Anthurium cerrosantiagoense Croat & O.Ortiz
- Anthurium chacoense Croat
- Anthurium chamberlainii Mast.
- Anthurium chamulense Matuda
- Anthurium chequitavense Croat
- Anthurium chiapasense Standl.
- Anthurium chimborazense Croat & Carlsen
- Anthurium chinchipense Croat & Lingán
- Anthurium chinimense Croat
- Anthurium chiriquense Standl.
- Anthurium chocoense Croat
- Anthurium chorense Engl.
- Anthurium chorranum Croat
- Anthurium christeliae Croat & O.Ortiz
- Anthurium chromostachyum Croat
- Anthurium chrysolithos Croat & Oberle
- Anthurium chucantiense O.Ortiz, Croat & Baldini
- Anthurium chuchubiense Croat
- Anthurium chucunesense Croat
- Anthurium churchilliorum Croat
- Anthurium churutense Croat & Cornejo
- Anthurium cinereopetiolatum Croat
- Anthurium cipoense Temponi
- Anthurium circinatum Croat
- Anthurium cirinoi Croat
- Anthurium citrifolium Sodiro
- Anthurium clarinervium Matuda
- Anthurium clarkei Croat
- Anthurium clathratum Sodiro
- Anthurium clavatum Croat & R.A.Baker
- Anthurium clavigerum Poepp.
- Anthurium cleistanthum G.M.Barroso
- Anthurium clewellii Croat & O.Ortiz
- Anthurium clidemioides Standl.
- Anthurium cobbiae Croat & Delannay
- Anthurium coclense Croat
- Anthurium cocornaense Croat
- Anthurium coerulescens Engl.
- Anthurium cogolloanum Croat & M.M.Mora
- Anthurium coicoyanense Croat & Ávila Blomb.
- Anthurium coleomischum Gilli
- Anthurium coleorrhiza Croat & D.C.Bay
- Anthurium collettianum Croat
- Anthurium collinsii Croat
- Anthurium colonchense Croat & Cornejo
- Anthurium colonense Croat
- Anthurium colonicum K.Krause
- Anthurium coloradense Croat
- Anthurium combeimense Croat & Oyuela
- Anthurium comtum Schott
- Anthurium concinnatum Schott
- Anthurium concolor K.Krause
- Anthurium conjunctum K.Krause
- Anthurium consimile Schott
- Anthurium consobrinum Schott
- Anthurium conspicuum Sodiro
- Anthurium constrictum Croat & Carlsen
- Anthurium conterminum Sodiro
- Anthurium copense O.Ortiz, M.Cedeño & Croat
- Anthurium corallinum Poepp.
- Anthurium cordatotriangulum Matuda
- Anthurium cordatum (L.) Schott
- Anthurium cordiforme Sodiro
- Anthurium cordobense Croat & D.C.Bay
- Anthurium cordulatum Sodiro
- Anthurium coriaceum G.Don
- Anthurium coripatense N.E.Br. ex Engl.
- Anthurium cornejoi Croat
- Anthurium correae Croat
- Anthurium corrugatum Sodiro
- Anthurium cotejense Croat
- Anthurium cotobrusii Croat & R.A.Baker
- Anthurium cowanii Croat
- Anthurium crassifolium N.E.Br.
- Anthurium crassilaminum Croat
- Anthurium crassinervium (Jacq.) Schott
- Anthurium crassiradix Croat
- Anthurium crassitepalum Croat
- Anthurium crassivenium Engl.
- Anthurium cremersii G.S.Bunting ex Croat
- Anthurium crenatum (L.) Kunth
- Anthurium croatii Madison
- Anthurium cronembergerae Nadruz & Temponi
- Anthurium crystallinum Linden & André
- Anthurium cuasicanum Croat
- Anthurium cubense Engl.
- Anthurium cucullispathum Croat
- Anthurium cultrifolium Schott
- Anthurium cupreonitens Engl.
- Anthurium cupreum Engl.
- Anthurium cupulispathum Croat & J.Rodr.
- Anthurium curicuriariense Croat
- Anthurium curtipedunculum Croat
- Anthurium curtispadix Croat
- Anthurium curvatum Sodiro
- Anthurium curvilaminum Croat
- Anthurium curvispadix Croat
- Anthurium cuspidatum Mast.
- Anthurium cuspidiferum Sodiro
- Anthurium cutucuense Madison
- Anthurium cuyabenoense Croat
- Anthurium cylindratum Croat & D.C.Bay
- Anthurium cymbiforme N.E.Br.
- Anthurium cymbispatha Sodiro

== D ==
- Anthurium dabeibaense Croat
- Anthurium daguense Engl.
- Anthurium dalmauii Croat
- Anthurium darcyi Croat
- Anthurium davidsei Croat
- Anthurium davidsoniae Standl.
- Anthurium debile Croat & D.C.Bay
- Anthurium debile-emarginatum Croat
- Anthurium debilipeltatum Croat
- Anthurium decipiens A.Hay & M.Cedeño
- Anthurium decurrens Poepp.
- Anthurium decursivum Croat
- Anthurium deflexum Engl.
- Anthurium delannayi Croat
- Anthurium deminutum Croat
- Anthurium dendrobates Sodiro
- Anthurium denudatum Engl.
- Anthurium diazii Croat
- Anthurium dichromum Croat
- Anthurium dichrophyllum Croat
- Anthurium digitatum (Jacq.) Schott
- Anthurium diversicaudex Croat
- Anthurium dolichocnemum Croat
- Anthurium dolichophyllum Sodiro
- Anthurium dolichostachyum Sodiro
- Anthurium dombeyanum Brongn. ex Engl.
- Anthurium dominicense Schott
- Anthurium donovaniae Croat
- Anthurium dorbayae Croat
- Anthurium draconopterum Sodiro
- Anthurium dressleri Croat
- Anthurium dukei Croat
- Anthurium durandii Engl.
- Anthurium dussii Engl.
- Anthurium dwyeri Croat
- Anthurium dylanii Croat

== E ==
- Anthurium ecuadorense Engl.
- Anthurium effusilobum Croat
- Anthurium effusispathum Croat
- Anthurium eggersii Engl.
- Anthurium eichleri Engl.
- Anthurium elisalevyae Croat
- Anthurium ellenbergii Delannay & Croat
- Anthurium elquincense Croat
- Anthurium emarginatum Baker
- Anthurium eminens Schott
- Anthurium ensifolium Bogner & E.G.Gonç.
- Anthurium ericae Diels
- Anthurium ernesti Engl.
- Anthurium erskinei Mayo
- Anthurium erythrospadix Nadruz, Camelo & Temponi
- Anthurium erythrospathaceum Nadruz & Theófilo
- Anthurium erythrostachyum Croat
- Anthurium esmeraldense Sodiro
- Anthurium espinae Croat
- Anthurium espiranzaense Croat & Zuluaga
- Anthurium eximium Engl.
- Anthurium expansum Gleason
- Anthurium exstipulatum Sodiro

== F ==
- Anthurium fasciale Sodiro
- Anthurium fatoense K.Krause
- Anthurium faustomirandae Pérez-Farr. & Croat
- Anthurium fendleri Schott
- Anthurium fernandezii Croat
- Anthurium filamatamaense Croat & O.Ortiz
- Anthurium filiforme Engl.
- Anthurium flavescens Poepp.
- Anthurium flavidum N.E.Br.
- Anthurium flavolineatum Sodiro
- Anthurium flavoviride Engl.
- Anthurium flexile Schott
- Anthurium fogdeniorum (Croat) O.Ortiz, M.Cedeño & Croat
- Anthurium folsomianum Croat
- Anthurium fontellanum Nadruz & Leoni
- Anthurium fontoides R.E.Schult.
- Anthurium foreroanum Croat
- Anthurium forgetii N.E.Br.
- Anthurium formosum Schott
- Anthurium fornicifolium Croat
- Anthurium fortunense Croat & O.Ortiz
- Anthurium fosteri Croat
- Anthurium fragae Nadruz
- Anthurium fragrans Croat & D.C.Bay
- Anthurium fragrantissimum Croat
- Anthurium fraseri Engl.
- Anthurium friedrichsthalii Schott
- Anthurium frontinoense Croat & Zuluaga
- Anthurium funiferum Klotzsch & H.Karst. ex Engl.
- Anthurium furcatum Sodiro
- Anthurium fuscopunctatum Sodiro
- Anthurium fusiforme Croat

== G ==
- Anthurium gaffurii Sodiro
- Anthurium galactospadix Croat
- Anthurium galeanoae Croat & M.M.Mora
- Anthurium galeottii K.Koch
- Anthurium galileanum Croat
- Anthurium gaskinii Croat
- Anthurium gaudichaudianum Kunth
- Anthurium gehrigeri Croat
- Anthurium geitnerianum A.Regel
- Anthurium gelpii Croat
- Anthurium genferryae Croat
- Anthurium geniculatum Sodiro
- Anthurium gentryi Croat
- Anthurium gerherrerae Croat
- Anthurium giganteum Engl.
- Anthurium ginesii Croat
- Anthurium giraldoi Croat
- Anthurium gladiifolium Schott
- Anthurium glanduligerum Engl.
- Anthurium glaucophyllum Sodiro
- Anthurium glaucospadix Croat
- Anthurium globosum Croat
- Anthurium gomesianum Nadruz
- Anthurium gonzalezii Croat
- Anthurium gracile (Rudge) Lindl.
- Anthurium gracililaminum Croat
- Anthurium gracilipedunculatum K.Krause
- Anthurium gracilispadix Croat
- Anthurium gracilistipum Croat
- Anthurium grande W.Bull
- Anthurium grandicataphyllum Croat & M.M.Mora
- Anthurium grandifolium (Jacq.) Kunth
- Anthurium granulineare Croat
- Anthurium grex-avium Madison
- Anthurium griseosessile Croat
- Anthurium gualeanum Engl.
- Anthurium guanacense Engl.
- Anthurium guanchezii G.S.Bunting
- Anthurium guanghuae Croat
- Anthurium guatemalense Croat, Cast.Mont & Vannini
- Anthurium guayaquilense Engl.
- Anthurium gustavii Regel
- Anthurium gymnopus Griseb.

== H ==
- Anthurium hacumense Engl.
- Anthurium hagsaterianum Haager
- Anthurium halmoorei Croat
- Anthurium haltonii Croat
- Anthurium hamiltonii Croat & Lingán
- Anthurium hammelii Croat
- Anthurium hannoniae Croat
- Anthurium harleyi T.A.Pontes & Mayo
- Anthurium harlingianum Croat
- Anthurium harrisii (Graham) G.Don
- Anthurium hartmanii Croat & O.Ortiz
- Anthurium hastifolium Sodiro
- Anthurium hatschbachii E.G.Gonç.
- Anthurium hayanum O.Ortiz & M.Cedeño
- Anthurium hebetatilaminum Croat & J.Rodr.
- Anthurium hebetatum Croat
- Anthurium hempeanum Croat
- Anthurium henryi Croat
- Anthurium herrerae Croat & P.Huang
- Anthurium herthae K.Krause
- Anthurium hieronymi Engl.
- Anthurium hinoideum Croat & D.C.Bay
- Anthurium hodgei Croat, M.M.Mora & Oberle
- Anthurium hoehnei K.Krause
- Anthurium hoffmannii Schott
- Anthurium holm-nielsenii Croat
- Anthurium holquinianum Croat & D.C.Bay
- Anthurium hookeri Kunth
- Anthurium hornitense Croat
- Anthurium horridum Croat
- Anthurium huacamayoense Croat
- Anthurium huallagense Engl.
- Anthurium huampamiense Croat
- Anthurium huanucense Engl.
- Anthurium huashikatii Croat
- Anthurium huautlense Matuda
- Anthurium huberi G.S.Bunting ex Croat
- Anthurium huixtlense Matuda
- Anthurium humboldtianum Kunth
- Anthurium humoense Croat
- Anthurium hutchisonii Croat
- Anthurium hygrophilum Engl.

== I ==
- Anthurium ianthinopodum (Engl.) Nadruz & Mayo
- Anthurium icanense G.M.Barroso
- Anthurium idimae Theófilo & Nadruz
- Anthurium idmense K.Krause
- Anthurium illepidum Schott
- Anthurium iltisii Croat
- Anthurium imazaense Croat
- Anthurium imperiale Miq. ex Schott
- Anthurium impolitoellipticum Croat
- Anthurium impolitum Croat
- Anthurium incomptum Madison
- Anthurium inconspicuum N.E.Br.
- Anthurium incurvatum Engl.
- Anthurium incurvum Engl.
- Anthurium infectorium R.E.Schult.
- Anthurium ingramii Croat
- Anthurium intactum Croat & O.Ortiz
- Anthurium intermedium Kunth
- Anthurium interruptum Sodiro
- Anthurium inzanum Engl.
- Anthurium ionanthum Croat
- Anthurium iramireziae G.S.Bunting
- Anthurium isidroense Croat & D.C.Bay
- Anthurium ixtlanense Diaz Jim., Pérez-Farr. & Croat

== J ==
- Anthurium jaimeanum Croat & Cerón
- Anthurium jaramilloi Croat & J.Rodr.
- Anthurium jefense Croat
- Anthurium jenmanii Engl.
- Anthurium jesusii Croat
- Anthurium jilekii Schott
- Anthurium jimenae Croat
- Anthurium joaquinense Croat & D.C.Bay
- Anthurium johnmackii Croat & Oberle
- Anthurium johnsoniae Croat
- Anthurium jorgemendietanum O.Ortiz, Croat & Baldini
- Anthurium josei Croat
- Anthurium juanguillermoi Croat
- Anthurium julianii G.S.Bunting
- Anthurium julospadix Sodiro
- Anthurium jureianum Cath. & Olaio

== K ==
- Anthurium kajekaii Croat
- Anthurium kallunkiae Croat
- Anthurium kamemotoanum Croat
- Anthurium kareniae Croat
- Anthurium karstenianum Engl.
- Anthurium kastelskii Schott
- Anthurium kayapii Croat
- Anthurium keatingii Croat
- Anthurium kinsingeriae Croat
- Anthurium kirkdukeorum O.Ortiz & Croat
- Anthurium knappiae Croat
- Anthurium krukovii Croat
- Anthurium kugkumasii Croat
- Anthurium kunayalense Croat & Vannini
- Anthurium kunthii Poepp.
- Anthurium kusuense Croat

== L ==
- Anthurium lacerdae Reitz
- Anthurium laciniosum Sodiro
- Anthurium lactifructum Croat
- Anthurium laevigatum Croat & O.Ortiz
- Anthurium laevum Croat & O.Ortiz
- Anthurium lakei Croat & P.Huang
- Anthurium laminense Croat
- Anthurium lancea Sodiro
- Anthurium lancetillense Croat
- Anthurium lancifolium Schott
- Anthurium langendoenii Croat & D.C.Bay
- Anthurium langsdorffii Schott
- Anthurium lanjouwii A.M.E.Jonker & Jonker
- Anthurium lasabanetaense Croat & O.Ortiz
- Anthurium latemarginatum Sodiro
- Anthurium latissimum Engl.
- Anthurium lautum Croat & D.C.Bay
- Anthurium lechlerianum Schott
- Anthurium lehmannii Engl.
- Anthurium lennartii Croat
- Anthurium lentii Croat & R.A.Baker
- Anthurium leonianum Sodiro
- Anthurium leonii E.G.Gonç.
- Anthurium leptocaule Croat
- Anthurium leptos Croat
- Anthurium leuconeurum Lem.
- Anthurium leveaui Croat
- Anthurium lezamae Matuda
- Anthurium libanoense Croat
- Anthurium licium Croat & Oberle
- Anthurium lievenii Regel ex Engl.
- Anthurium ligulare Croat
- Anthurium lilacinum G.S.Bunting
- Anthurium lilafructum Croat
- Anthurium limonense Grayum
- Anthurium lindenianum K.Koch & Augustin
- Anthurium lindmanianum Engl.
- Anthurium lineolatum Sodiro
- Anthurium linganii Croat
- Anthurium lingua Sodiro
- Anthurium linguifolium Engl.
- Anthurium llanense Croat
- Anthurium llewellynii Croat
- Anthurium lloense Sodiro
- Anthurium loefgrenii Engl.
- Anthurium lojtnantii Croat
- Anthurium longegeniculatum Engl.
- Anthurium longeinternodum Croat
- Anthurium longicaudatum Engl.
- Anthurium longicuspidatum Engl.
- Anthurium longifolium (Hoffm.) G.Don
- Anthurium longipeltatum Matuda
- Anthurium longipes N.E.Br.
- Anthurium longispadiceum K.Krause
- Anthurium longissimilobum Croat
- Anthurium longissimum Pittier
- Anthurium longistamineum Engl.
- Anthurium longistipitatum Croat
- Anthurium longiusculum Croat
- Anthurium loretense Croat
- Anthurium louisii Croat & R.A.Baker
- Anthurium lucens Standl.
- Anthurium lucidum Kunth
- Anthurium lucilanum Croat & O.Ortiz
- Anthurium lucioi Nadruz
- Anthurium lucorum Engl.
- Anthurium luschnathianum Kunth
- Anthurium luteospathum Croat
- Anthurium lutescens Engl.
- Anthurium luteynii Croat
- Anthurium lutheri Croat
- Anthurium luxurians Croat & R.N.Cirino
- Anthurium luzense Diaz Jim., Pérez-Farr. & Croat
- Anthurium lygrum Croat & D.C.Bay
- Anthurium lynniae Croat

== M ==
- Anthurium maasii Croat
- Anthurium macarenense R.E.Schult. & Idrobo
- Anthurium macbridei K.Krause
- Anthurium macdanielii Croat
- Anthurium machetioides Matuda
- Anthurium macleanii Schott
- Anthurium macphersonii Croat & Oberle
- Anthurium macrocephalum R.E.Schult.
- Anthurium macrolonchium Sodiro
- Anthurium macrophyllum (Sw.) Schott
- Anthurium macropodum E.G.Gonç.
- Anthurium macrospadix Lem.
- Anthurium macrourum Sodiro
- Anthurium maculosum Sodiro
- Anthurium macveaniae Croat
- Anthurium madisonianum Croat
- Anthurium magdae Croat & Lingán
- Anthurium magnificum Linden
- Anthurium magnifolium Croat & J.Rodr.
- Anthurium magrewii Croat
- Anthurium maguirei A.D.Hawkes
- Anthurium malagaense Croat & D.C.Bay
- Anthurium malianum Croat
- Anthurium manabianum Croat
- Anthurium mancuniense C.D.Adams
- Anthurium mansellii Croat
- Anthurium manuanum Croat
- Anthurium marcusianum Theófilo, L.Kollmann & Sakur.
- Anthurium marense K.Krause
- Anthurium margaricarpum Sodiro
- Anthurium marginellum Sodiro
- Anthurium marginervium Croat
- Anthurium mariae Croat & Lingán
- Anthurium maricense Nadruz & Mayo
- Anthurium marinoanum Croat
- Anthurium marleenianum Croat
- Anthurium marmoratum Sodiro
- Anthurium martae Croat & Castaño
- Anthurium martianum K.Koch & Kolb
- Anthurium martinellii Nadruz & Theófilo
- Anthurium masfense Sodiro
- Anthurium mateoi Croat & N.Altam.
- Anthurium mausethii Croat, O.Ortiz & Hormell
- Anthurium maximum (Desf.) Engl.
- Anthurium megapetiolatum E.G.Gonç.
- Anthurium melampyi Croat
- Anthurium melanochlorum Croat
- Anthurium melastomatis Croat
- Anthurium membranaceum Sodiro
- Anthurium mendietae Croat
- Anthurium merlei Croat
- Anthurium metallicum Linden ex Schott
- Anthurium miaziense Croat
- Anthurium michelii Guillaumin
- Anthurium microphyllum (Hook.) G.Don
- Anthurium microspadix Schott
- Anthurium mikeneei Croat
- Anthurium minarum Sakur. & Mayo
- Anthurium mindense Sodiro
- Anthurium miniatum Sodiro
- Anthurium minutipustulum Croat
- Anthurium miritiparanaense Croat & J.Watt
- Anthurium misturatum Croat
- Anthurium modicum Croat & Oberle
- Anthurium molaui Croat
- Anthurium molle E.G.Gonç. & J.G.Jardim
- Anthurium mongonense Croat
- Anthurium montanum Hemsl.
- Anthurium monteagudoi Croat & N.Altam.
- Anthurium monteazulense Croat, O.Ortiz & Baldini
- Anthurium monteverdense Croat & R.A.Baker
- Anthurium monticola Engl.
- Anthurium monzonense Engl.
- Anthurium moonenii Croat & E.G.Gonç.
- Anthurium morae Croat
- Anthurium morii Mayo & Haigh
- Anthurium moronense Croat & Carlsen
- Anthurium mostaceroi Croat
- Anthurium mourae Engl.
- Anthurium mucuri E.G.Gonç. & L.F.A.Paula
- Anthurium multinervium Engl.
- Anthurium multisulcatum Engl.
- Anthurium munchiquense Croat
- Anthurium myosuroides (Kunth) Endl.
- Anthurium myosurus Sodiro

== N ==
- Anthurium nakamurae Matuda
- Anthurium nangaritense Croat
- Anthurium nanum R.E.Schult.
- Anthurium napaeum Engl.
- Anthurium narae Nadruz, Camelo & Temponi
- Anthurium narinoense Croat
- Anthurium narvaezii Croat
- Anthurium navasii Sodiro
- Anthurium naviculare Cath. & Nadruz
- Anthurium nelsonii Croat
- Anthurium nemorale Sodiro
- Anthurium nemoricola R.E.Schult. & Maguire
- Anthurium nervatum Croat
- Anthurium nestorpazii Croat & P.Huang
- Anthurium ngabebuglense Croat & O.Ortiz
- Anthurium nicolasianum Engl.
- Anthurium nigrescens Engl.
- Anthurium nigropunctatum Croat & J.Rodr.
- Anthurium niqueanum Croat
- Anthurium nitens Sodiro
- Anthurium nitidulum Engl.
- Anthurium nitidum Benth.
- Anthurium nizandense Matuda
- Anthurium nomdiosense Croat & O.Ortiz
- Anthurium novencidoanum O.Ortiz & Croat
- Anthurium novitaense Croat
- Anthurium nubicola G.S.Bunting
- Anthurium nutibarense Croat
- Anthurium nymphaeifolium K.Koch & C.D.Bouché

== O ==
- Anthurium obliquatum Schott
- Anthurium obpyriforme Leimbeck
- Anthurium obscurinervium Croat
- Anthurium obtusatum Engl.
- Anthurium obtusifolium (W.T.Aiton) G.Don
- Anthurium obtusilobum Schott
- Anthurium obtusum (Engl.) Grayum
- Anthurium occidentale Sodiro
- Anthurium ochranthum K.Koch
- Anthurium ochreatum Sodiro
- Anthurium ocotepecense Matuda
- Anthurium oerstedianum Schott
- Anthurium oistophyllum O.Ortiz, Croat & Baldini
- Anthurium oreodoxa Sodiro
- Anthurium oreophilum Sodiro
- Anthurium organense Engl.
- Anthurium orientale Sodiro
- Anthurium orlandoi Croat
- Anthurium orlando-ortizii Croat
- Anthurium ottobuchtienii Croat
- Anthurium ottonis K.Krause
- Anthurium ovatifolium Engl.
- Anthurium ovidioi Croat
- Anthurium oxyanthum Croat & D.C.Bay
- Anthurium oxybelium Schott
- Anthurium oxycarpum Poepp.
- Anthurium oxyphyllum Sodiro
- Anthurium oxystachyum Croat
- Anthurium oyuelae Croat

== P ==
- Anthurium pachylaminum Croat
- Anthurium pachyspathum K.Krause
- Anthurium pageanum Croat
- Anthurium pahumense Cerón & Croat
- Anthurium palacioanum Croat
- Anthurium palenquense Croat
- Anthurium pallatangense Engl.
- Anthurium pallens Schott
- Anthurium pallidicaudex Croat & M.M.Mora
- Anthurium pallidiflorum Engl.
- Anthurium palmarense Croat
- Anthurium palmatum (L.) Schott
- Anthurium paloraense Croat
- Anthurium palosecense Croat & O.Ortiz
- Anthurium paludosum Engl.
- Anthurium panamense Croat
- Anthurium panduriforme Schott
- Anthurium pandurilaminum Croat
- Anthurium papillilaminum Croat
- Anthurium paradisicum G.S.Bunting
- Anthurium paraguasense Croat
- Anthurium paraguayense Engl.
- Anthurium parambae Sodiro
- Anthurium parasiticum (Vell.) Stellfeld
- Anthurium pariense G.S.Bunting
- Anthurium parvispathum Hemsl.
- Anthurium parvum N.E.Br.
- Anthurium pastasanum Diels
- Anthurium patens Croat
- Anthurium pauciflorum Croat
- Anthurium paucinerve Sodiro
- Anthurium payaminoense Croat & Lingán
- Anthurium pazii Croat
- Anthurium pedatoradiatum Schott
- Anthurium pedatum (Kunth) Endl. ex Kunth
- Anthurium pedrazae Croat & Zuluaga
- Anthurium pedunculare Sodiro
- Anthurium pellucidopunctatum Sodiro
- Anthurium peltatum Poepp.
- Anthurium peltigerum Sodiro
- Anthurium penae Croat
- Anthurium pendens Croat
- Anthurium pendulifolium N.E.Br.
- Anthurium pendulispadix Croat
- Anthurium penningtonii Croat
- Anthurium penonomense Croat
- Anthurium pentaphyllum (Aubl.) G.Don
- Anthurium perijanum G.S.Bunting
- Anthurium perviride Croat & D.C.Bay
- Anthurium pescadilloense Croat
- Anthurium petiolicarinatum Nadruz, Mantovani & Carlsen
- Anthurium petrophilum K.Krause
- Anthurium phyllobaris Croat & D.C.Bay
- Anthurium picadoae O.Ortiz & Croat
- Anthurium pichinchae Engl.
- Anthurium pichindense Croat
- Anthurium pilonense Reitz
- Anthurium pinkleyi Croat & Carlsen
- Anthurium pirottae Sodiro
- Anthurium pirrense Croat
- Anthurium pittieri Engl.
- Anthurium piurensis Croat & Lingán
- Anthurium planadense Croat
- Anthurium plantagineum Sodiro
- Anthurium platyglossum Sodiro
- Anthurium platyrhizum Croat
- Anthurium plowmanii Croat
- Anthurium plurisulcatum Sodiro
- Anthurium pluviaticum R.E.Schult.
- Anthurium podophyllum (Cham. & Schltdl.) Kunth
- Anthurium pohlianum Engl.
- Anthurium poloense Croat
- Anthurium polydactylum Madison
- Anthurium polynervium Temponi & Nadruz
- Anthurium polyneuron Sodiro
- Anthurium polyphlebium Sodiro
- Anthurium polyschistum R.E.Schult. & Idrobo
- Anthurium polystictum Sodiro
- Anthurium porcesitoense Croat
- Anthurium potarense Gleason
- Anthurium pradoense Croat
- Anthurium praealtum Sodiro
- Anthurium pranceanum Croat
- Anthurium prolatum Croat & R.A.Baker
- Anthurium prominens Engl.
- Anthurium promininerve Croat & M.M.Mora
- Anthurium protensum Schott
- Anthurium protrudens Croat
- Anthurium pseudonigrescens Croat
- Anthurium pseudospectabile Croat
- Anthurium pseudotalamancae Croat
- Anthurium psilostachyum Sodiro
- Anthurium ptarianum Steyerm.
- Anthurium ptenospathum Croat & O.Ortiz
- Anthurium puberulinervium Croat
- Anthurium puberulum Croat & Lingán
- Anthurium pucayacuense Croat
- Anthurium pucuroense O.Ortiz & Croat
- Anthurium pulcachense Croat
- Anthurium pulchellum Engl.
- Anthurium pulidoae Croat
- Anthurium pulverulentum Sodiro
- Anthurium punctatum N.E.Br.
- Anthurium punkuyocense Croat
- Anthurium purdieanum Schott
- Anthurium purpureospathum Croat
- Anthurium purpureum N.E.Br.

== Q ==
- Anthurium queirozianum Nadruz
- Anthurium quinindense Croat
- Anthurium quinonesiae Croat
- Anthurium quinquenervium (Kunth) Kunth
- Anthurium quinquesulcatum Sodiro
- Anthurium quipuscoae Croat

== R ==
- Anthurium radiatum Sodiro
- Anthurium radicans K.Koch & Haage
- Anthurium raimundii Mayo, Haigh & Nadruz
- Anthurium ramoncaracasii Stergios & Dorr
- Anthurium ramonense Engl. ex K.Krause
- Anthurium ramosense Croat
- Anthurium ramosii Croat
- Anthurium ranchoanum Engl.
- Anthurium raphaelense Croat & Delannay
- Anthurium ratonense Croat & O.Ortiz
- Anthurium ravenii Croat & R.A.Baker
- Anthurium recavum Croat
- Anthurium rectinervium Delannay & Croat
- Anthurium redolens Croat
- Anthurium reflexinervium Croat
- Anthurium regale Linden
- Anthurium remotigeniculatum Croat
- Anthurium remotum Croat & D.C.Bay
- Anthurium renteriae Croat
- Anthurium resectum Sodiro
- Anthurium restrepoae Croat
- Anthurium reticulatum Benth.
- Anthurium retiferum Standl. & Steyerm.
- Anthurium rhizophorum Sodiro
- Anthurium rhodorhizum Diels
- Anthurium ribeiroi Nadruz
- Anthurium ricaurtense Croat
- Anthurium rigidifolium Engl.
- Anthurium rimbachii Sodiro
- Anthurium rioacimense Nadruz & Rabelo
- Anthurium riocojimiesense Croat
- Anthurium riodocense Nadruz
- Anthurium riofrioi Sodiro
- Anthurium riograndicola Matuda
- Anthurium riojaense Croat
- Anthurium rionegrense Matuda
- Anthurium riparium Engl.
- Anthurium rivulare Sodiro
- Anthurium rociorojasiae Delannay & Croat
- Anthurium rodrigueziae Croat
- Anthurium rodvasquezii Croat
- Anthurium roezlii Regel
- Anthurium rojasiae Croat
- Anthurium roraimense N.E.Br.
- Anthurium roseonaviculare Croat & O.Ortiz
- Anthurium roseospadix Croat
- Anthurium rosselianum Croat
- Anthurium rotundatum Croat & Carlsen
- Anthurium rotundilobum Engl.
- Anthurium rotundistigmatum Croat
- Anthurium roubikii Croat
- Anthurium rubrifructum Croat
- Anthurium rubrivellus Croat & D.C.Bay
- Anthurium rugulosum Sodiro
- Anthurium rupestre Sodiro
- Anthurium rupicola Croat
- Anthurium rzedowskii Croat

== S ==
- Anthurium saccardoi Sodiro
- Anthurium sagawae Croat
- Anthurium sagittale Sodiro
- Anthurium sagittaria Linden ex Schott
- Anthurium sagittatum (Sims) G.Don
- Anthurium sagittellum Sodiro
- Anthurium sagrilloanum Theófilo & T.F.Sagrillo
- Anthurium sakuraguianum Nadruz & Temponi
- Anthurium salgarense Croat
- Anthurium salvadorense Croat
- Anthurium salvinii Hemsl.
- Anthurium samamaense Croat & Cornejo
- Anthurium sanctifidense Croat
- Anthurium sanguineum Engl.
- Anthurium sanjorgense Oyuela & Croat
- Anthurium santamariae Croat & O.Ortiz
- Anthurium santaritensis Nadruz & Croat
- Anthurium santiagoense Croat
- Anthurium sapense Croat
- Anthurium sarmentosum Engl.
- Anthurium sarukhanianum Croat & Haager
- Anthurium scaberulum Sodiro
- Anthurium scandens (Aubl.) Engl.
- Anthurium scherzerianum Schott
- Anthurium schlechtendalii Kunth
- Anthurium schottianum Croat & R.A.Baker
- Anthurium schunkei K.Krause
- Anthurium sebastianense Croat & Cerón
- Anthurium seibertii Croat & R.A.Baker
- Anthurium seleri Engl.
- Anthurium × selloanum K.Koch
- Anthurium sellowianum Kunth
- Anthurium septuplinervium Sodiro
- Anthurium shinumas Croat
- Anthurium siapidaarae Zuluaga & Sánchez-Taborda
- Anthurium siccisilvarum K.Krause
- Anthurium sidneyi Croat & Lingán
- Anthurium sierpense Croat
- Anthurium signatum K.Koch & L.Mathieu
- Anthurium silanchense Croat & J.Rodr.
- Anthurium silverstonei Croat & Oberle
- Anthurium silvicola Engl.
- Anthurium silvigaudens Standl. & Steyerm.
- Anthurium simonii Nadruz
- Anthurium simpsonii Croat
- Anthurium sinuatum Benth. ex Schott
- Anthurium siqueirae Nadruz
- Anthurium sixaolense Croat, Belt & O.Ortiz
- Anthurium smaragdinum G.S.Bunting
- Anthurium smithii Croat
- Anthurium sneidernii Croat
- Anthurium sodiroanum Engl.
- Anthurium soejartoi Croat & Oberle
- Anthurium solanoi Croat & O.Ortiz
- Anthurium solitarium Schott
- Anthurium solomonii Croat
- Anthurium sonaense Croat & O.Ortiz
- Anthurium soukupii Croat
- Anthurium sparreorum Croat
- Anthurium spathiphyllum N.E.Br.
- Anthurium spathulifolium Sodiro
- Anthurium spectabile Schott
- Anthurium splendidum W.Bull ex Rodigas
- Anthurium standleyi Croat & R.A.Baker
- Anthurium stephanii Croat & Acebey
- Anthurium stipitatum Benth.
- Anthurium straminopetiolum Croat
- Anthurium striatipes Sodiro
- Anthurium striatum K.Koch & L.Mathieu
- Anthurium striolatum Sodiro
- Anthurium stuebelii Engl.
- Anthurium subaequans Croat & Oberle
- Anthurium subcarinatum Engl.
- Anthurium subcaudatum Engl.
- Anthurium subcoerulescens Engl.
- Anthurium subcordatum Schott
- Anthurium subhastatum Schott
- Anthurium subovatum Matuda
- Anthurium subrotundum Croat
- Anthurium subsagittatum (Kunth) Kunth
- Anthurium subscriptum G.S.Bunting
- Anthurium subsignatum Schott
- Anthurium subtriangulare Engl.
- Anthurium subtrilobum Schott
- Anthurium subtruncatum Sodiro
- Anthurium subulatum N.E.Br.
- Anthurium sucrii G.M.Barroso
- Anthurium suethompsoniae Croat
- Anthurium suffusum Croat & O.Ortiz
- Anthurium sulcatum Engl.
- Anthurium superbum Madison
- Anthurium supianum Engl.
- Anthurium supraglandulum Croat
- Anthurium suramaense Croat
- Anthurium sylvestre S.Moore
- Anthurium sytsmae Croat

== T ==
- Anthurium tacarcunense Croat
- Anthurium tachiranum Croat
- Anthurium talamancae Engl.
- Anthurium talmonii Mayo & Haigh
- Anthurium tamaense G.S.Bunting
- Anthurium tarapotense Engl.
- Anthurium tatei G.S.Bunting
- Anthurium taylorianum Croat & O.Ortiz
- Anthurium teimosoanum E.G.Gonç. & J.G.Jardim
- Anthurium temponiae Nadruz & Theófilo
- Anthurium tenaense Croat
- Anthurium tenerum Engl.
- Anthurium tenuicaule Engl.
- Anthurium tenuifolium Engl.
- Anthurium tenuireticulum Croat & O.Ortiz
- Anthurium tenuispica Sodiro
- Anthurium teribense Croat
- Anthurium ternifolium Croat & Carlsen
- Anthurium terracola Croat
- Anthurium terryae Standl. & L.O.Williams
- Anthurium testaceum Croat & R.A.Baker
- Anthurium thompsoniae I.Arias
- Anthurium thrinax Madison
- Anthurium tifense Croat & O.Ortiz
- Anthurium tikunorum R.E.Schult.
- Anthurium tilaranense Standl.
- Anthurium timplowmanii Croat
- Anthurium titanium Standl. & Steyerm.
- Anthurium toisanense Croat
- Anthurium tolimense Engl.
- Anthurium tomasiae Cath. & Nadruz
- Anthurium tonduzii Engl.
- Anthurium tonianum Sodiro
- Anthurium torraense Croat
- Anthurium tortuosum Croat
- Anthurium totontepecense Croat
- Anthurium trangulohastatum Croat
- Anthurium treleasei Sodiro
- Anthurium tremulum Sodiro
- Anthurium trianae Engl.
- Anthurium triangulopetiolum Croat
- Anthurium tricarinatum Sodiro
- Anthurium triciafrankiae Croat
- Anthurium trifidum Oliv.
- Anthurium trilobum Lindl.
- Anthurium trinervium Kunth
- Anthurium triphyllum (Willd. ex Schult.) Brongn. ex Schott
- Anthurium trisectum Sodiro
- Anthurium trujilloi Croat
- Anthurium truncatulum Engl.
- Anthurium truncatum E.G.Gonç.
- Anthurium truncicola Engl.
- Anthurium tsamajainii Croat
- Anthurium tubualaense Croat & O.Ortiz
- Anthurium tunquii Croat
- Anthurium tutense Croat
- Anthurium tysonii Croat

== U ==
- Anthurium uasadiensis G.S.Bunting ex Croat
- Anthurium uleanum Engl.
- Anthurium umbraculum Sodiro
- Anthurium umbricola Engl.
- Anthurium umbrosum Liebm.
- Anthurium unense Nadruz & Cath.
- Anthurium upalaense Croat & R.A.Baker
- Anthurium urvilleanum Schott
- Anthurium utleyorum Croat & R.A.Baker

== V ==
- Anthurium valenzuelae Croat & N.Altam.
- Anthurium validifolium K.Krause
- Anthurium validinervium Engl.
- Anthurium vallense Croat
- Anthurium vanderknaapii Croat
- Anthurium variegatum Sodiro
- Anthurium variilobum Croat & M.M.Mora
- Anthurium vaupesianum Croat
- Anthurium veitchii Mast.
- Anthurium velutinum Engl.
- Anthurium venadoense Croat
- Anthurium venosum Griseb.
- Anthurium ventanasense Croat
- Anthurium verapazense Engl.
- Anthurium verrucosum Croat & D.C.Bay
- Anthurium versicolor Sodiro
- Anthurium vestitum Sodiro
- Anthurium victorii Nadruz & Cath.
- Anthurium vientense Croat
- Anthurium vinillense G.S.Bunting
- Anthurium viridescens Engl.
- Anthurium viridifusiforme Croat & O.Ortiz
- Anthurium viridispathum E.G.Gonç.
- Anthurium viridivinosum Theófilo & Sakur.
- Anthurium vittariifolium Engl.
- Anthurium vomeriforme Sodiro

== W ==
- Anthurium wagenerianum K.Koch & C.D.Bouché
- Anthurium wallisii Mast.
- Anthurium walujewii Regel
- Anthurium waramirezii Croat
- Anthurium warintsense Croat
- Anthurium warocqueanum T.Moore
- Anthurium watermaliense L.H.Bailey & Nash
- Anthurium wattii Croat & D.C.Bay
- Anthurium weberbaueri Engl.
- Anthurium wedelianum Croat
- Anthurium wendlingeri G.M.Barroso
- Anthurium werffii Croat
- Anthurium werneri Croat
- Anthurium whitmorei Croat & Lingán
- Anthurium willdenowii Kunth
- Anthurium willifordii Croat
- Anthurium wintersii Croat & D.C.Bay
- Anthurium wurdackii G.S.Bunting

== X ==
- Anthurium xanthoneurum G.S.Bunting
- Anthurium xanthophylloides G.M.Barroso

== Y ==
- Anthurium yamayakatense Croat
- Anthurium yanacochense Croat, C.Ulloa & E.Freire
- Anthurium yarumalense Engl.
- Anthurium yatacuense Croat
- Anthurium yetlense Matuda
- Anthurium yungasense Croat & Acebey
- Anthurium yurimaguense Engl. ex K.Krause
- Anthurium yutajense G.S.Bunting

== Z ==
- Anthurium zappiae Haigh, Nadruz & Mayo
- Anthurium zeneidae Nadruz
- Anthurium zuluagae Croat
