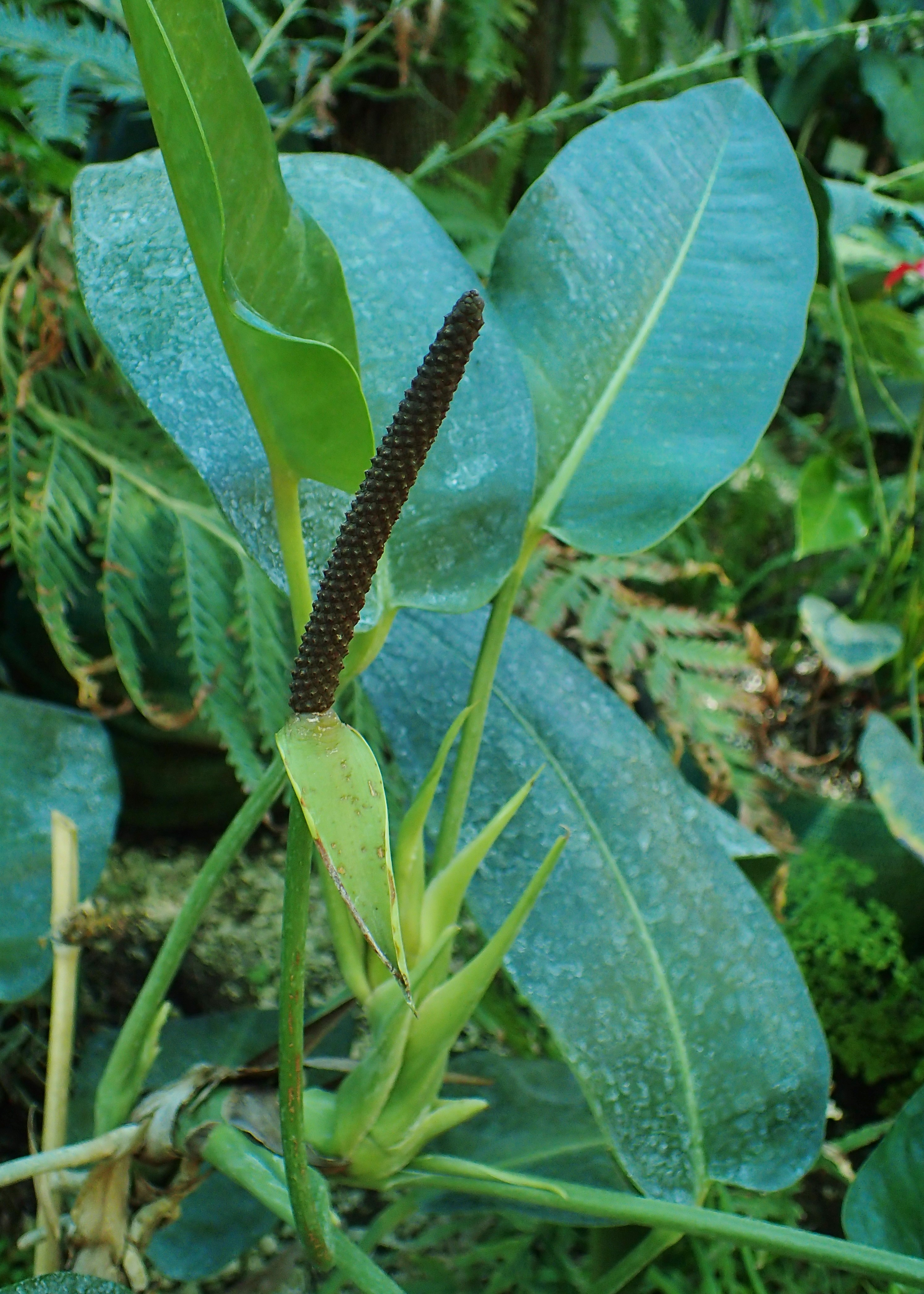

Scientific classification
- Kingdom: Plantae
- Clade: Tracheophytes
- Clade: Angiosperms
- Clade: Monocots
- Order: Alismatales
- Family: Araceae
- Genus: Anthurium
- Species: A. lucidum

Binomial name
- Anthurium lucidum Kunth.

= Anthurium lucidum =

Species of flowering plant

Anthurium lucidum is a species of Anthurium found in Rio de Janeiro, Brazil.
