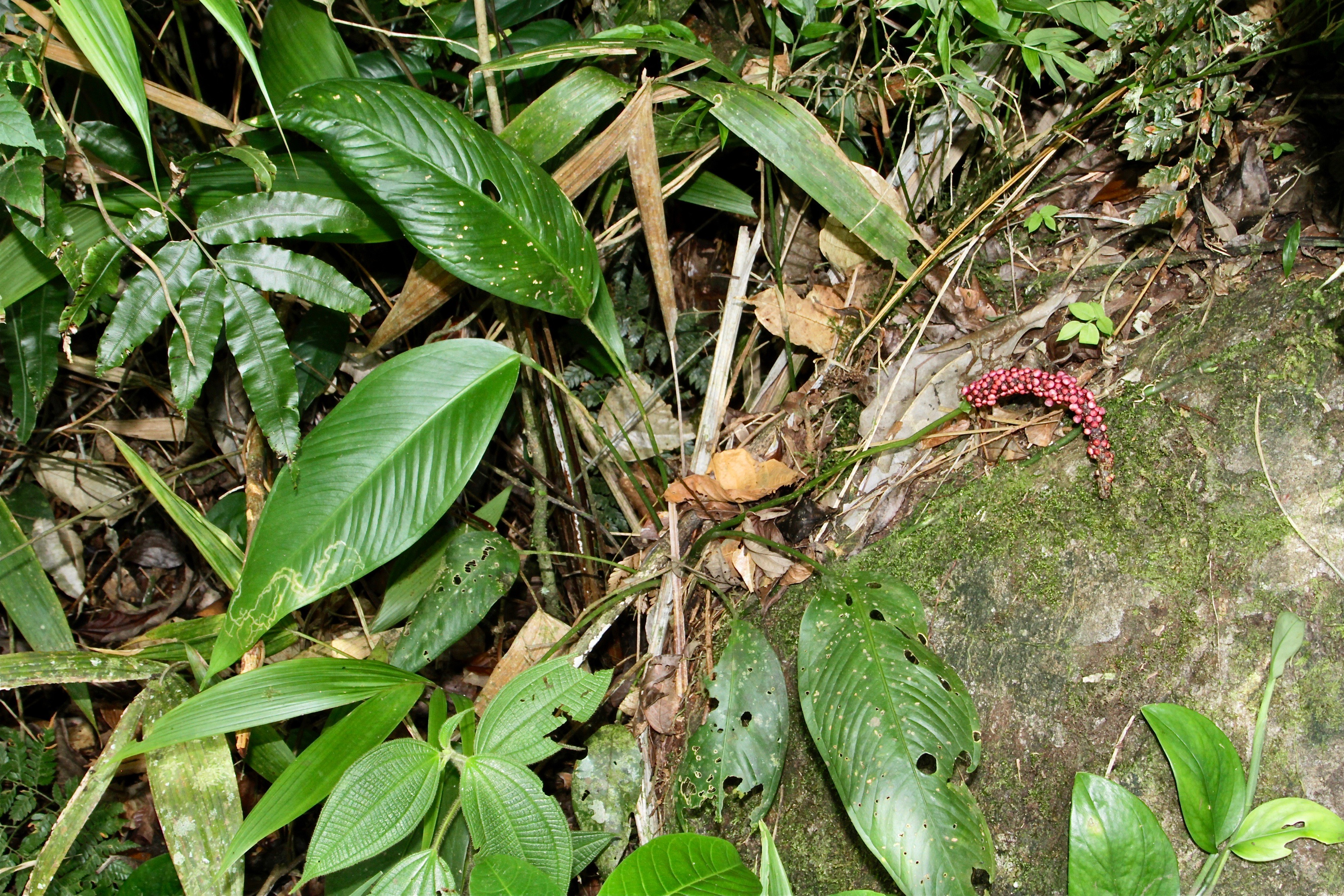

Scientific classification
- Kingdom: Plantae
- Clade: Tracheophytes
- Clade: Angiosperms
- Clade: Monocots
- Order: Alismatales
- Family: Araceae
- Genus: Anthurium
- Species: A. lancifolium

Binomial name
- Anthurium lancifolium Schott

= Anthurium lancifolium =

Species of flowering plant

Anthurium lancifolium is a species of Anthurium found from Costa Rica to Colombia.
