= Anthurium rhizophorum =

Conservation status
- Data Deficient (IUCN 3.1)

Scientific classification
- Kingdom: Plantae
- Clade: Tracheophytes
- Clade: Angiosperms
- Clade: Monocots
- Order: Alismatales
- Family: Araceae
- Genus: Anthurium
- Species: A. rhizophorum

Binomial name
- Anthurium rhizophorum Sodiro

Species of flowering plant

Anthurium rhizophorum is a species of plant in the family Araceae. It is endemic to Ecuador. Its natural habitat is subtropical or tropical moist lowland forests. It is threatened by habitat loss.
