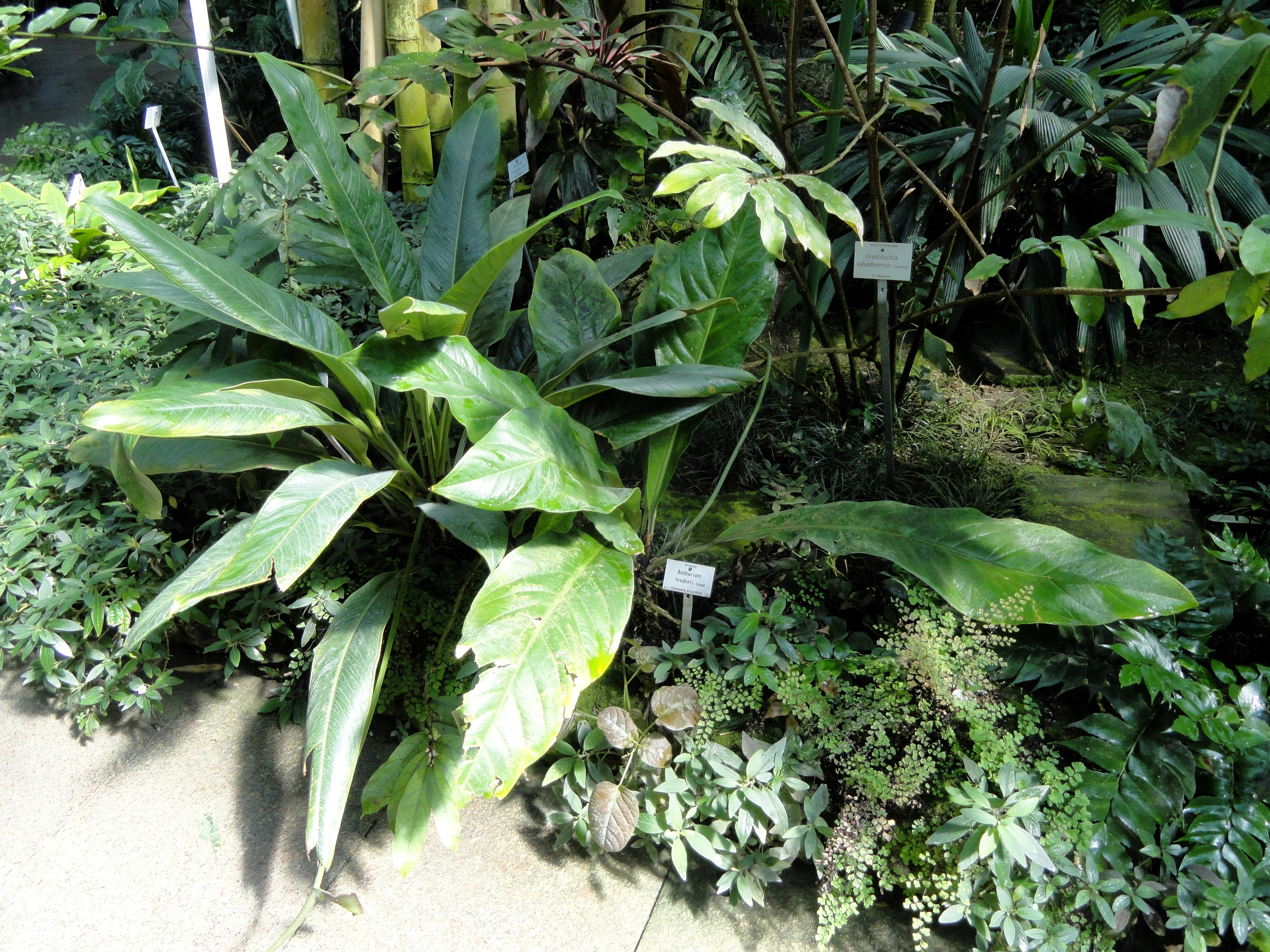

Scientific classification
- Kingdom: Plantae
- Clade: Tracheophytes
- Clade: Angiosperms
- Clade: Monocots
- Order: Alismatales
- Family: Araceae
- Genus: Anthurium
- Species: A. fendleri

Binomial name
- Anthurium fendleri Schott

= Anthurium fendleri =

Species of plant

Anthurium fendleri is a species of Anthurium found in Colombia, Panama, and Venezuela.
