= Anthurium spectabile =

Scientific classification
- Kingdom: Plantae
- Clade: Tracheophytes
- Clade: Angiosperms
- Clade: Monocots
- Order: Alismatales
- Family: Araceae
- Genus: Anthurium
- Species: A. spectabile

Binomial name
- Anthurium spectabile Schott

Species of plant

Anthurium spectabile is a large herbaceous rainforest plant in the family Araceae, native to Costa Rica. It is notable for its huge oblong-lanceolate leaf blade, or lamina, up to 1.5 m (4 ft 11 in) or more in length plus a petiole up to 50 cm (20 in) long.
