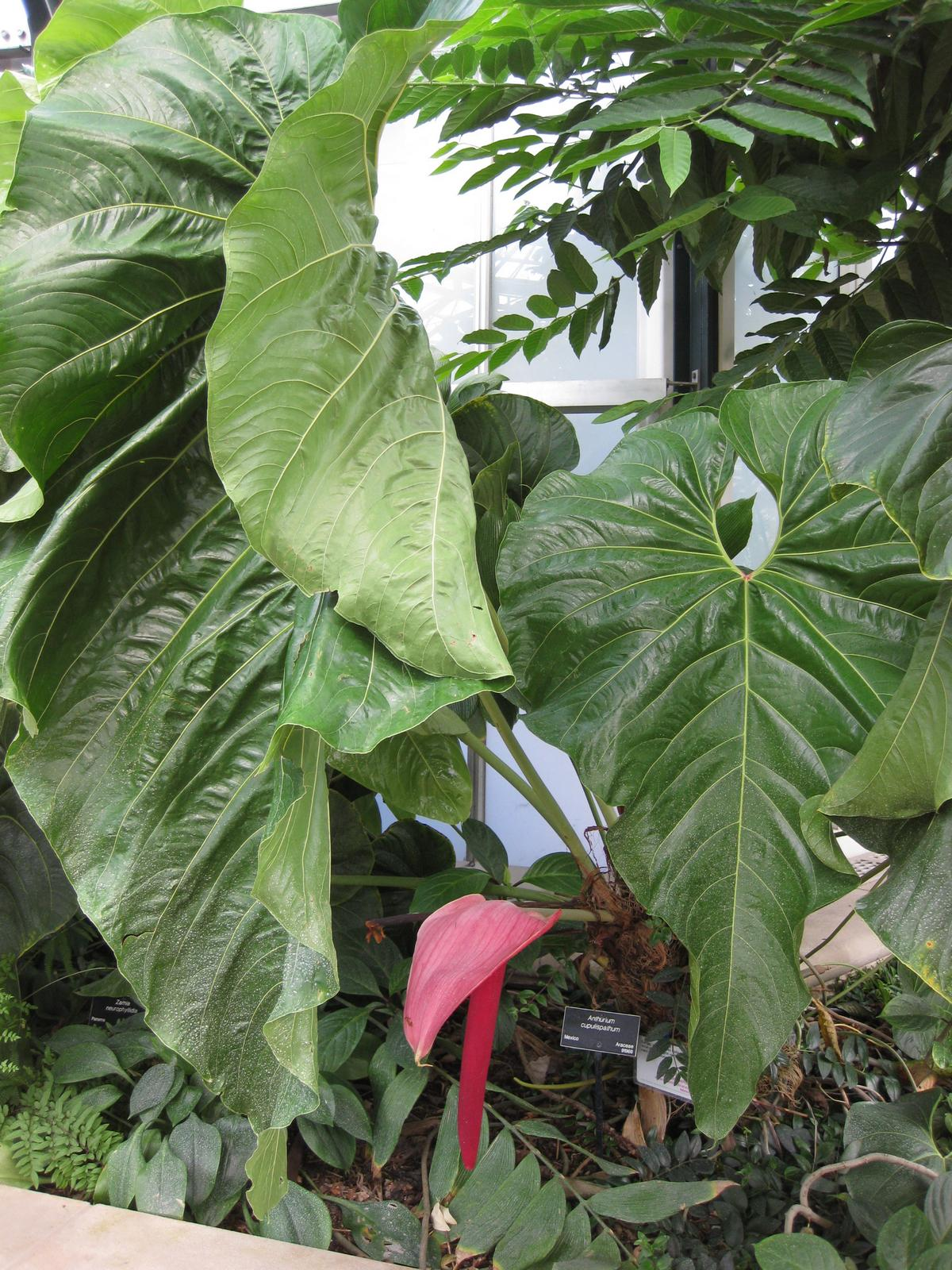

Scientific classification
- Kingdom: Plantae
- Clade: Tracheophytes
- Clade: Angiosperms
- Clade: Monocots
- Order: Alismatales
- Family: Araceae
- Genus: Anthurium
- Species: A. cupulispathum

Binomial name
- Anthurium cupulispathum Croat

= Anthurium cupulispathum =

Species of plant

Anthurium cupulispathum is a species of Anthurium found in Ecuador and Colombia at elevations of 600 to 3300 meters. A. cupulispathum is in section Belolonchium of the genus.
