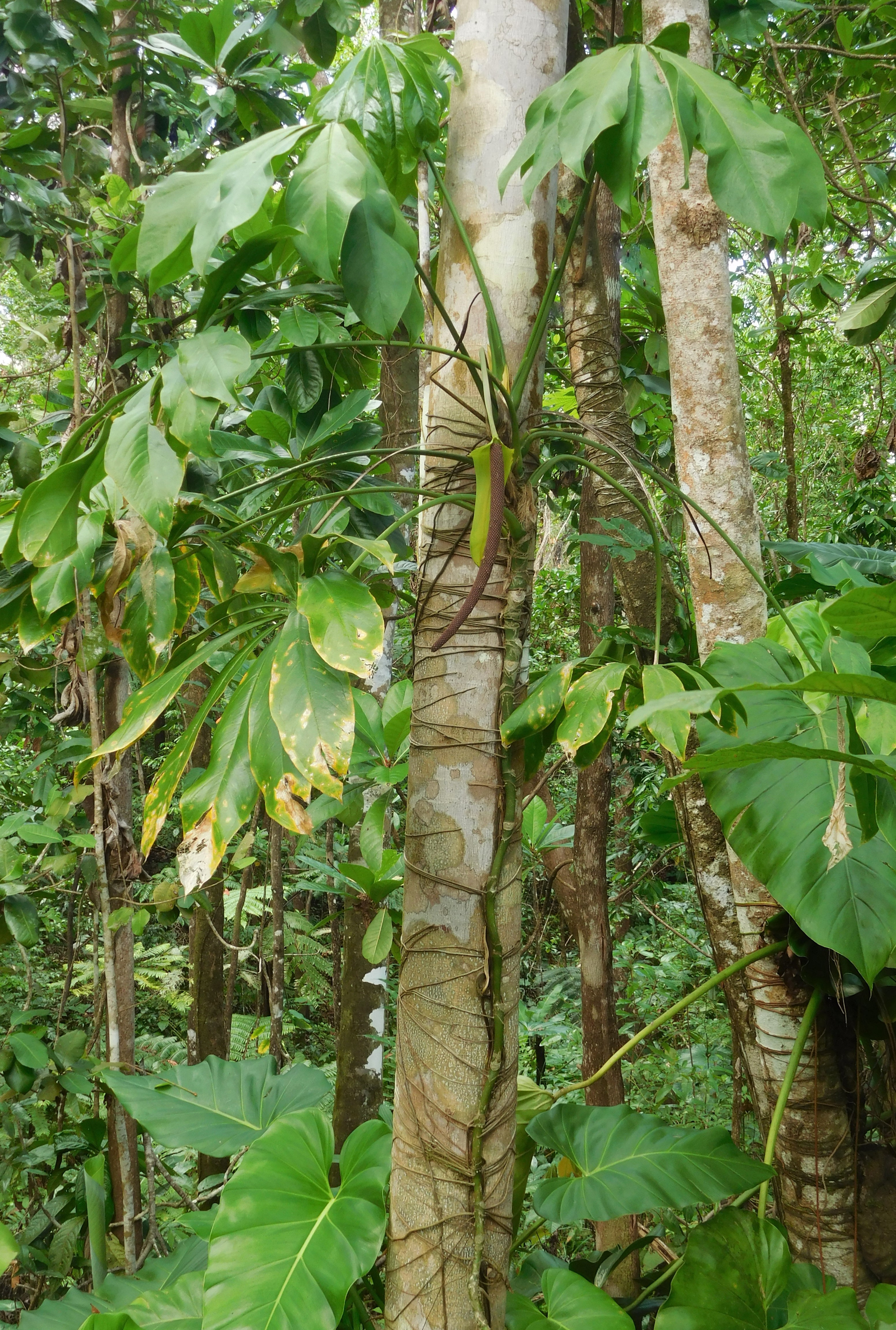

Scientific classification
- Kingdom: Plantae
- Clade: Tracheophytes
- Clade: Angiosperms
- Clade: Monocots
- Order: Alismatales
- Family: Araceae
- Genus: Anthurium
- Species: A. palmatum

Binomial name
- Anthurium palmatum (L.) Schott

= Anthurium palmatum =

Species of flowering plant

Anthurium palmatum is a species of Anthurium found in Colombia, Leeward Islands, and Windward Islands.
