= Anthurium hieronymi =

Conservation status
- Endangered (IUCN 3.1)

Scientific classification
- Kingdom: Plantae
- Clade: Tracheophytes
- Clade: Angiosperms
- Clade: Monocots
- Order: Alismatales
- Family: Araceae
- Genus: Anthurium
- Species: A. hieronymi

Binomial name
- Anthurium hieronymi Engl.

Species of flowering plant

Anthurium hieronymi is a species of plant in the arum family, Araceae. It is endemic to Ecuador. It is an epiphyte which grows in coastal forest habitat.
