= Anthurium gualeanum =

Conservation status
- Vulnerable (IUCN 3.1)

Scientific classification
- Kingdom: Plantae
- Clade: Tracheophytes
- Clade: Angiosperms
- Clade: Monocots
- Order: Alismatales
- Family: Araceae
- Genus: Anthurium
- Species: A. gualeanum

Binomial name
- Anthurium gualeanum Engl.

Synonyms
- Anthurium cochliodes Sodiro; Anthurium micromystrium Sodiro

Species of flowering plant

Anthurium gualeanum is a species of plant in the family Araceae. It is endemic to Ecuador. Its natural habitats are subtropical or tropical moist lowland forests and subtropical or tropical moist montane forests. It is threatened by habitat loss.
