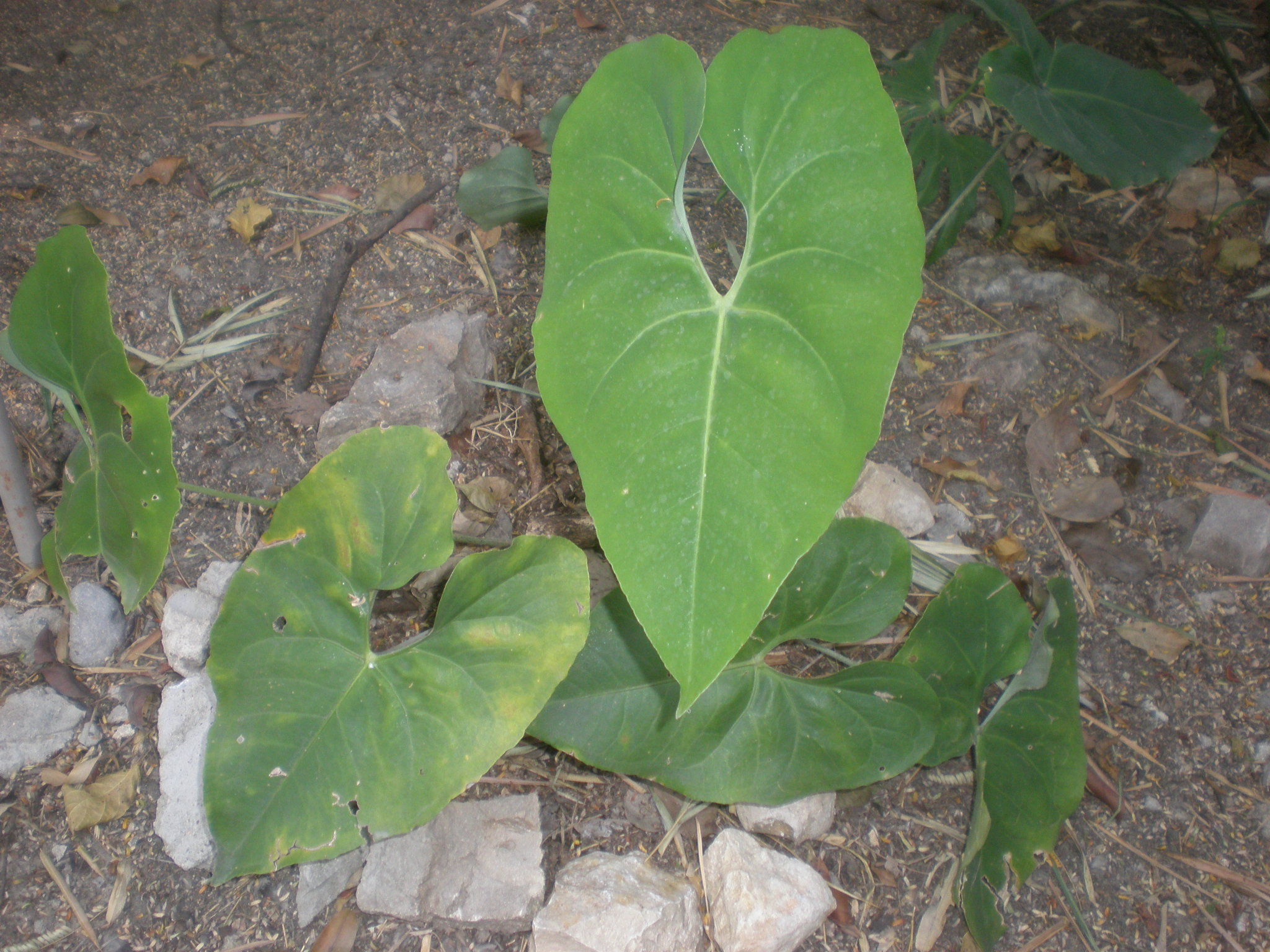

Scientific classification
- Kingdom: Plantae
- Clade: Tracheophytes
- Clade: Angiosperms
- Clade: Monocots
- Order: Alismatales
- Family: Araceae
- Genus: Anthurium
- Species: A. rionegrense

Binomial name
- Anthurium rionegrense Matuda

= Anthurium rionegrense =

Species of flowering plant

Anthurium rionegrense is a species of Anthurium found in Mexico.
