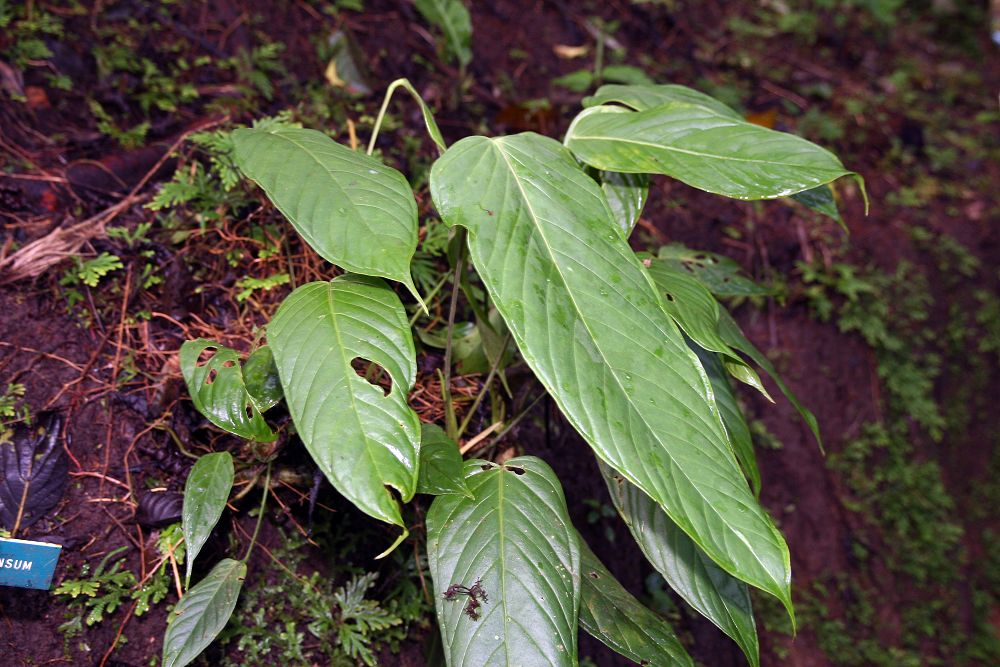

Scientific classification
- Kingdom: Plantae
- Clade: Tracheophytes
- Clade: Angiosperms
- Clade: Monocots
- Order: Alismatales
- Family: Araceae
- Genus: Anthurium
- Species: A. protensum

Binomial name
- Anthurium protensum Schott

= Anthurium protensum =

Species of plant

Anthurium protensum is a species of Anthurium found in Costa Rica.
