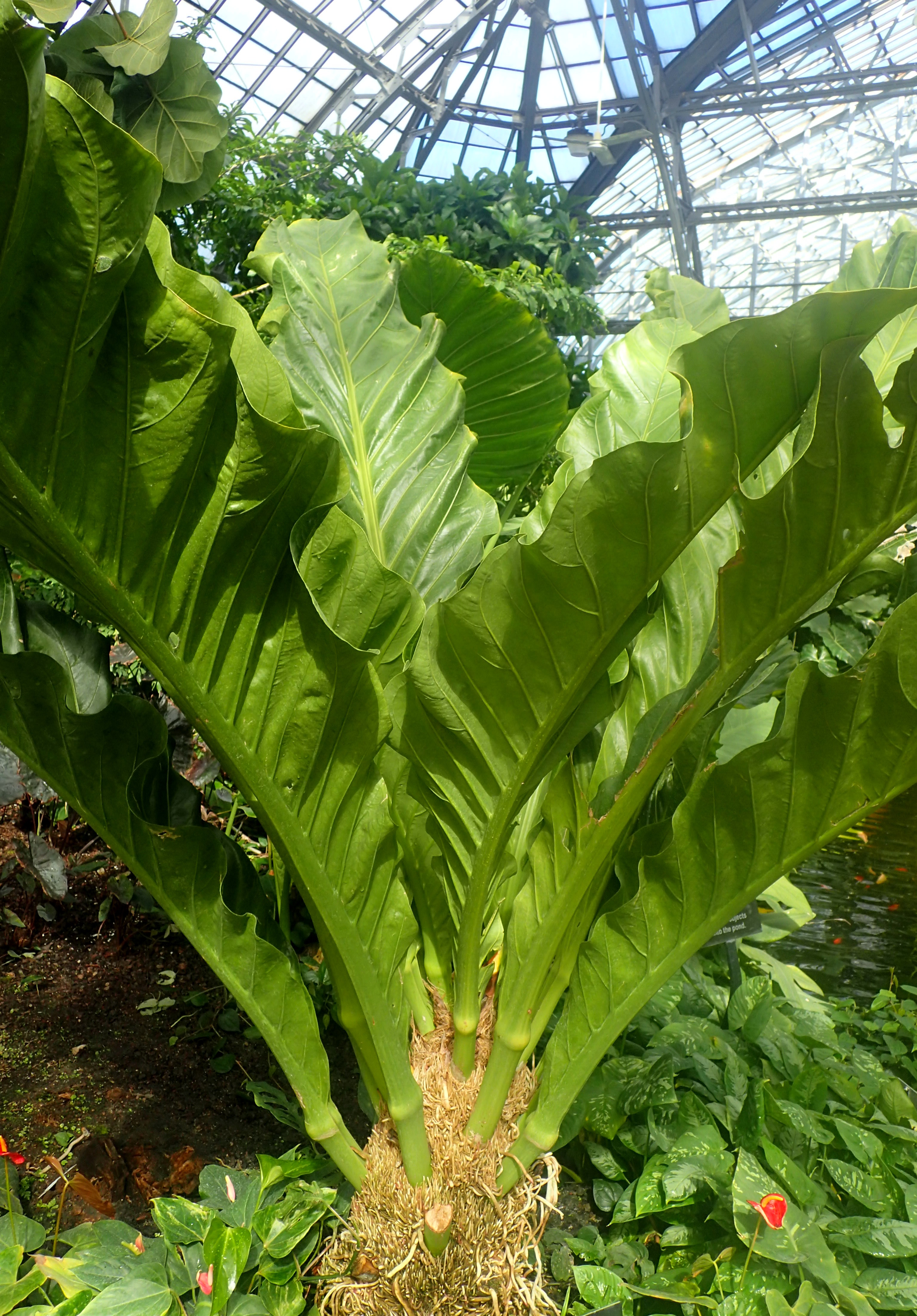

Scientific classification
- Kingdom: Plantae
- Clade: Tracheophytes
- Clade: Angiosperms
- Clade: Monocots
- Order: Alismatales
- Family: Araceae
- Genus: Anthurium
- Species: A. dombeyanum

Binomial name
- Anthurium dombeyanum Brongn. ex Engl.

= Anthurium dombeyanum =

Species of flowering plant

Anthurium dombeyanum is a species of Anthurium found in Ecuador and Peru.
