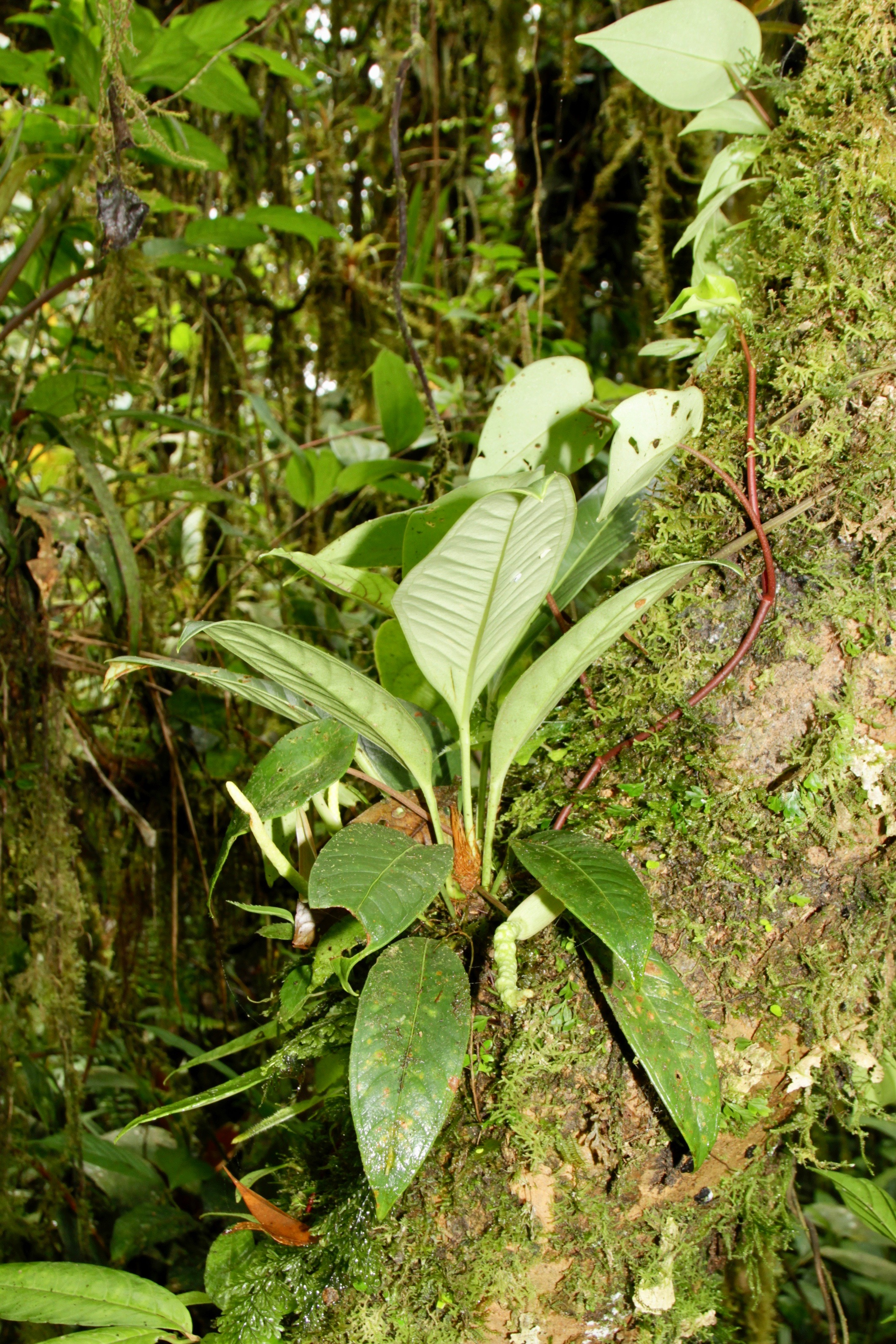
- Anthurium dwyeri growing in Panama

Scientific classification
- Kingdom: Plantae
- Clade: Tracheophytes
- Clade: Angiosperms
- Clade: Monocots
- Order: Alismatales
- Family: Araceae
- Genus: Anthurium
- Species: A. dwyeri

Binomial name
- Anthurium dwyeri Croat

= Anthurium dwyeri =

Species of plant

Anthurium dwyeri is a species of plant in the genus Anthurium native from Costa Rica to the Chocó Department of Colombia. Named in honor of the botanist Dr John D. Dwyer, it has no known close relatives but is a member of the section Porphyrochitonium. An epiphyte, it is most easily recognizable by its leathery, oblong to elliptical leaves that are 24–40 centimetres (9.4–15.7 in) long and grow on triangular stems.
