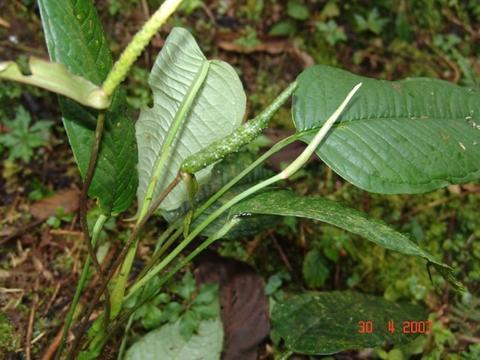

Scientific classification
- Kingdom: Plantae
- Clade: Tracheophytes
- Clade: Angiosperms
- Clade: Monocots
- Order: Alismatales
- Family: Araceae
- Genus: Anthurium
- Species: A. amoenum

Binomial name
- Anthurium amoenum Kunth & C.D.Bouché

= Anthurium amoenum =

Species of plant

Anthurium amoenum is a species of Anthurium found in Bolivia, Colombia, Ecuador, Peru, and Venezuela
