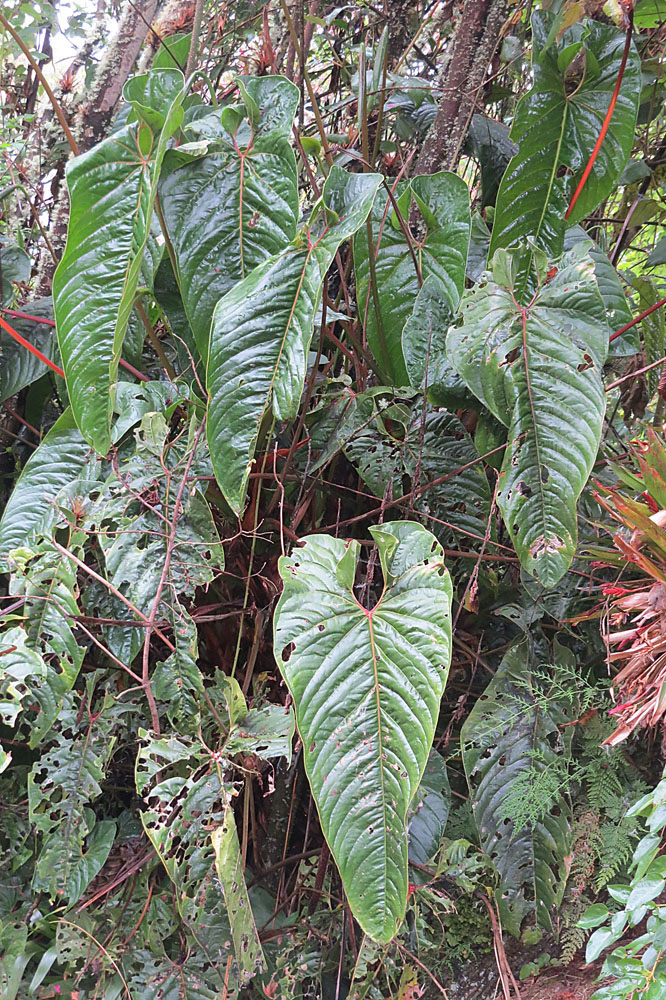

Scientific classification
- Kingdom: Plantae
- Clade: Tracheophytes
- Clade: Angiosperms
- Clade: Monocots
- Order: Alismatales
- Family: Araceae
- Genus: Anthurium
- Species: A. oxybelium

Binomial name
- Anthurium oxybelium Schott

= Anthurium oxybelium =

Species of flowering plant

Anthurium oxybelium is a species of Anthurium found in Colombia, Ecuador, and Peru.
