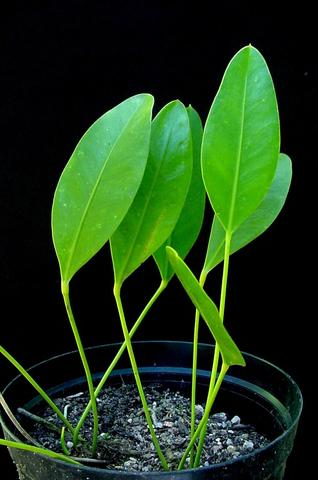

Scientific classification
- Kingdom: Plantae
- Clade: Tracheophytes
- Clade: Angiosperms
- Clade: Monocots
- Order: Alismatales
- Family: Araceae
- Genus: Anthurium
- Species: A. alcatrazense

Binomial name
- Anthurium alcatrazense Nadruz & Cath.

= Anthurium alcatrazense =

Species of plant

Anthurium alcatrazense is a species of Anthurium found in São Paulo, Brazil.
