= Anthurium ecuadorense =

Conservation status
- Vulnerable (IUCN 3.1)

Scientific classification
- Kingdom: Plantae
- Clade: Tracheophytes
- Clade: Angiosperms
- Clade: Monocots
- Order: Alismatales
- Family: Araceae
- Genus: Anthurium
- Species: A. ecuadorense

Binomial name
- Anthurium ecuadorense Engl.

Species of flowering plant

Anthurium ecuadorense is a species of plant in the family Araceae. It is endemic to Ecuador. Its natural habitat is subtropical or tropical moist montane forests. It is threatened by habitat loss. It is currently classified as Vulnerable.
