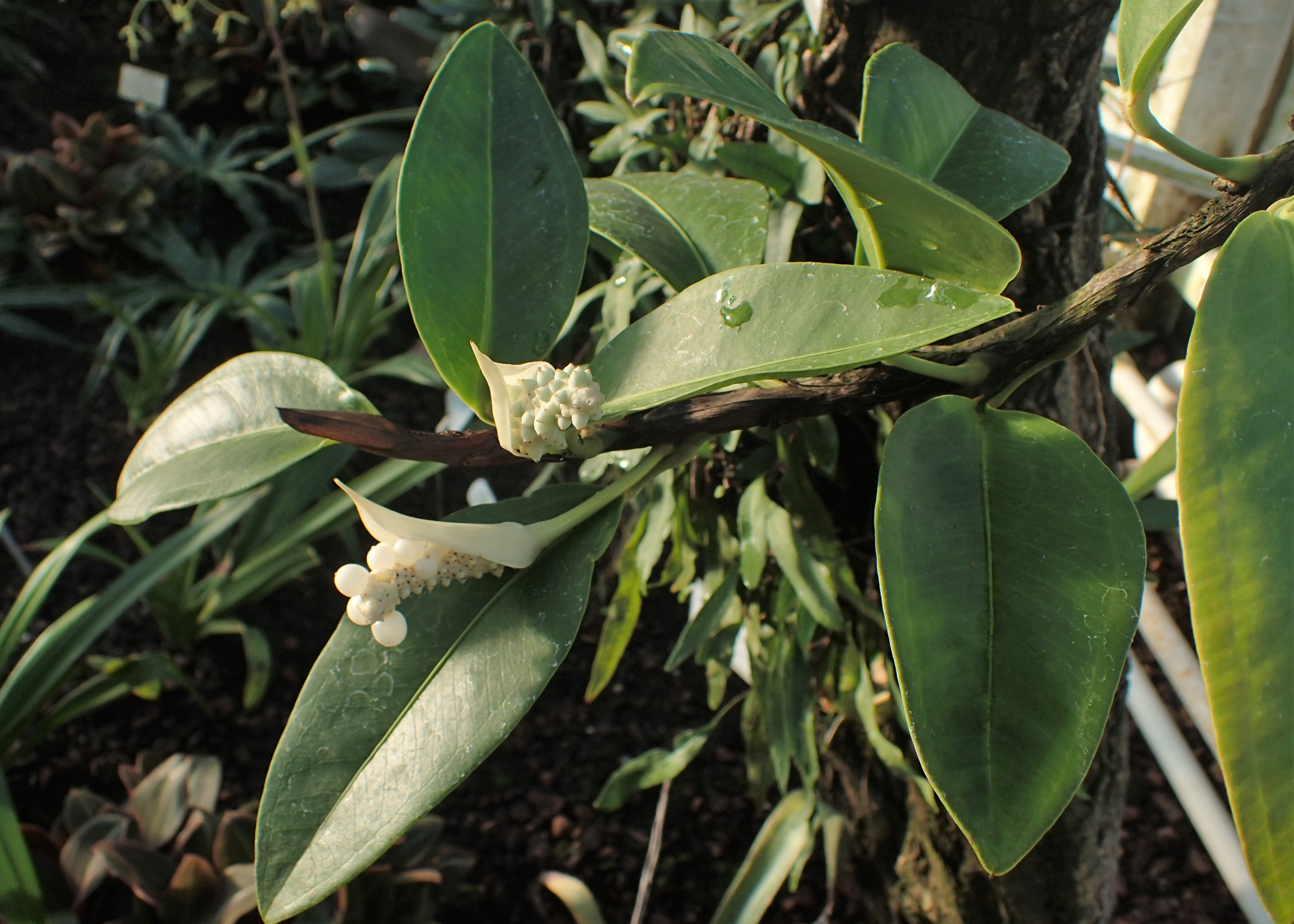

Scientific classification
- Kingdom: Plantae
- Clade: Tracheophytes
- Clade: Angiosperms
- Clade: Monocots
- Order: Alismatales
- Family: Araceae
- Genus: Anthurium
- Species: A. subsignatum

Binomial name
- Anthurium subsignatum Schott

= Anthurium subsignatum =

Species of flowering plant

Anthurium subsignatum is a species of Anthurium in Costa Rica and Nicaragua.
