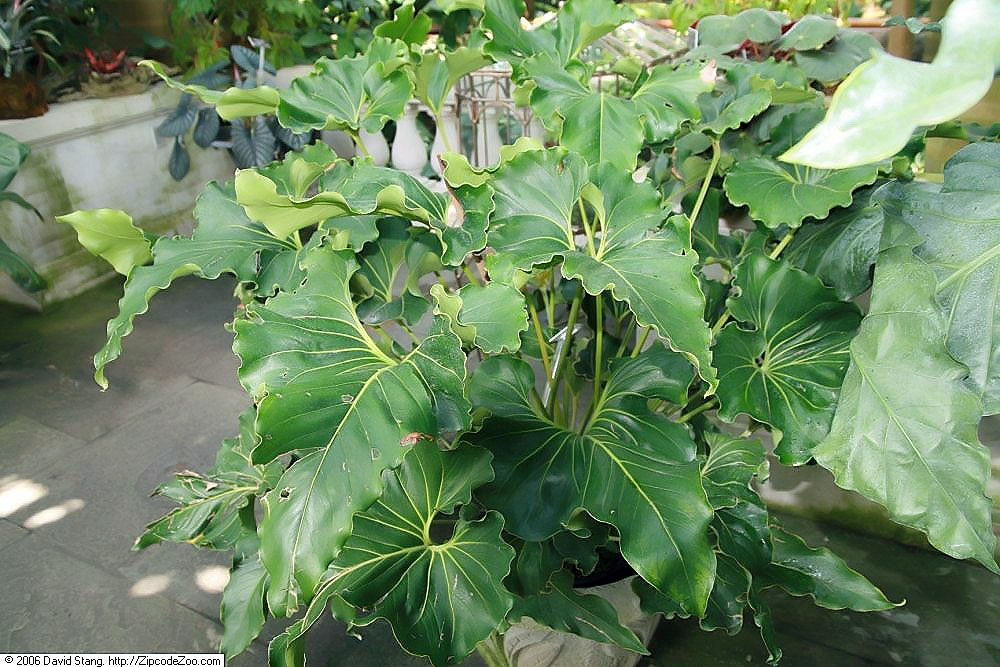

Scientific classification
- Kingdom: Plantae
- Clade: Tracheophytes
- Clade: Angiosperms
- Clade: Monocots
- Order: Alismatales
- Family: Araceae
- Genus: Anthurium
- Species: A. andicola

Binomial name
- Anthurium andicola Liebm.

= Anthurium andicola =

Species of plant

Anthurium andicola is a species of Anthurium found in Mexico
