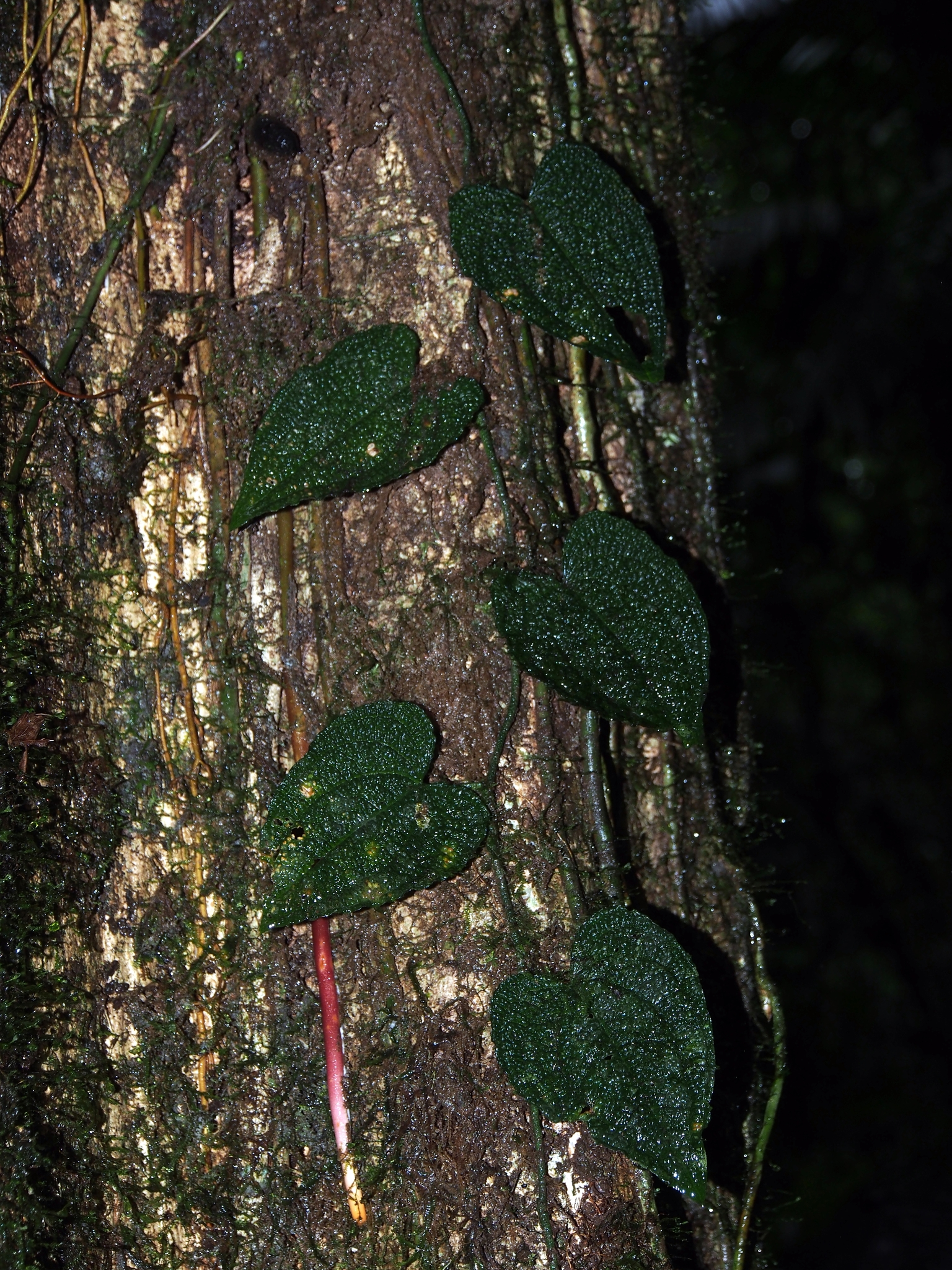
- A. Anthurium clidemioides growing in habitat in Costa Rica

Scientific classification
- Kingdom: Plantae
- Clade: Tracheophytes
- Clade: Angiosperms
- Clade: Monocots
- Order: Alismatales
- Family: Araceae
- Genus: Anthurium
- Species: A. clidemioides

Binomial name
- Anthurium clidemioides Standl.

= Anthurium clidemioides =

Species of plant

Anthurium clidemioides is a species of plant in the genus Anthurium native to Costa Rica, Panama, and Colombia. One of the more distinctive Anthuriums, it is a vining climber with almost stalkless, bullate leaves that can range from light to very dark green. Along with Anthurium flexile it is one of only two species in the genus that produces roots between nodes.

== Subspecies ==
A. clidemioides has two identified subspecies:

- Anthurium clidemioides subsp. clidemioides
- Anthurium clidemioides subsp. pacificum Croat & Grayum
