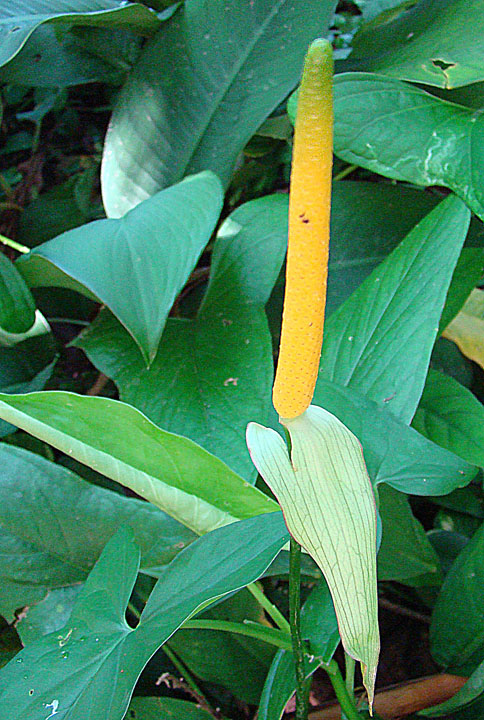

Scientific classification
- Kingdom: Plantae
- Clade: Tracheophytes
- Clade: Angiosperms
- Clade: Monocots
- Order: Alismatales
- Family: Araceae
- Genus: Anthurium
- Species: A. ochranthum

Binomial name
- Anthurium ochranthum

Synonyms
- Anthurium baileyi Standl.; Anthurium lapathifolium Schott; Anthurium pluricostatum Croat & R.A.Baker; Anthurium triangulum Engl.; Anthurium tsakianum Engl.

= Anthurium ochranthum =

Species of flowering plant

Anthurium ochranthum is a species of flowering plant in the family Araceae found from Honduras to Colombia.
