= Anthurium hastifolium =

Conservation status
- Data Deficient (IUCN 3.1)

Scientific classification
- Kingdom: Plantae
- Clade: Tracheophytes
- Clade: Angiosperms
- Clade: Monocots
- Order: Alismatales
- Family: Araceae
- Genus: Anthurium
- Species: A. hastifolium

Binomial name
- Anthurium hastifolium Sodiro

Species of flowering plant

Anthurium hastifolium is a species of plant in the family Araceae. It is endemic to Ecuador, in South America. Its natural habitat is subtropical or tropical moist montane forests. Anthurium hastifolium is threatened by habitat loss.
