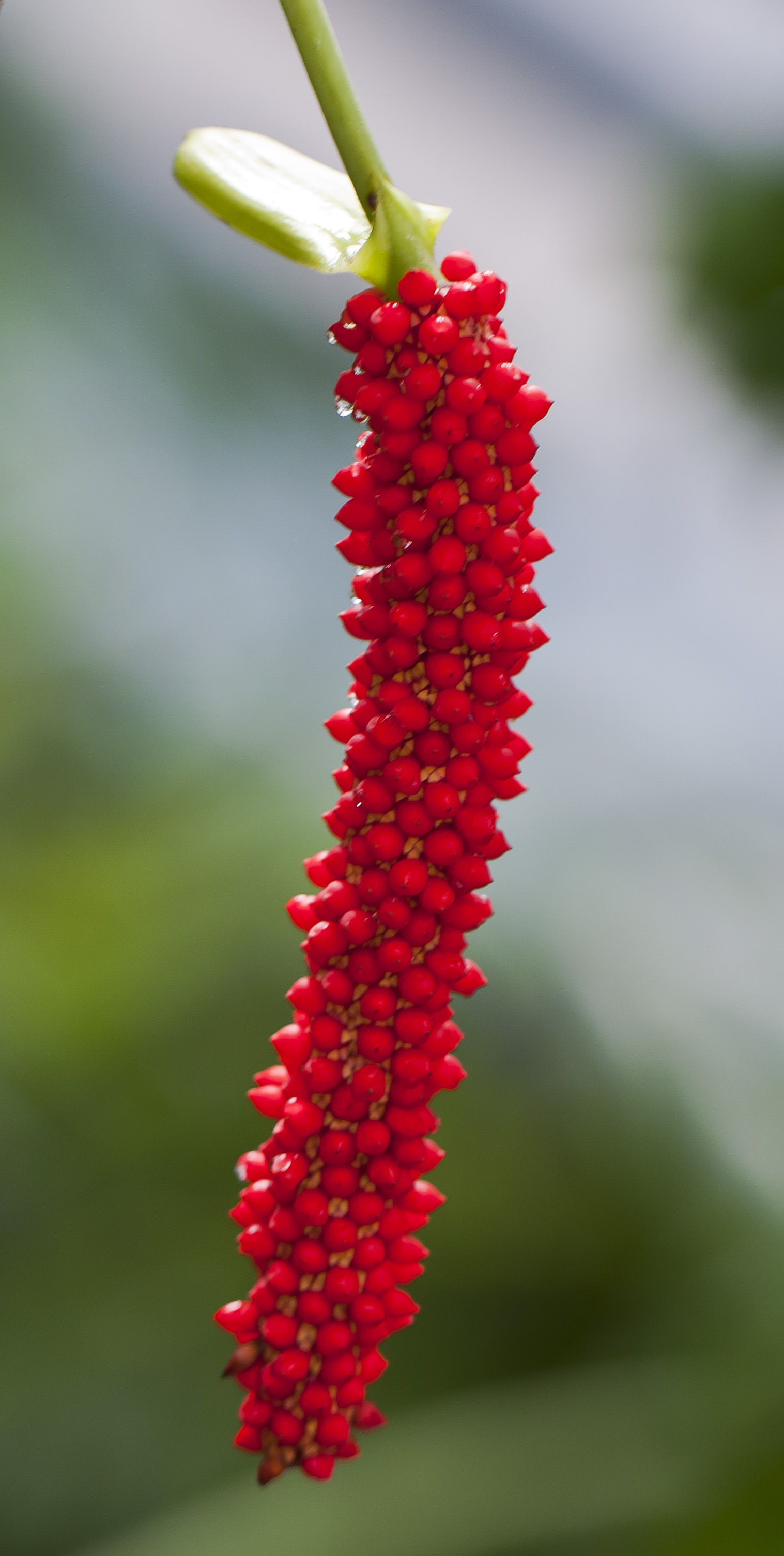
- Inflorescence
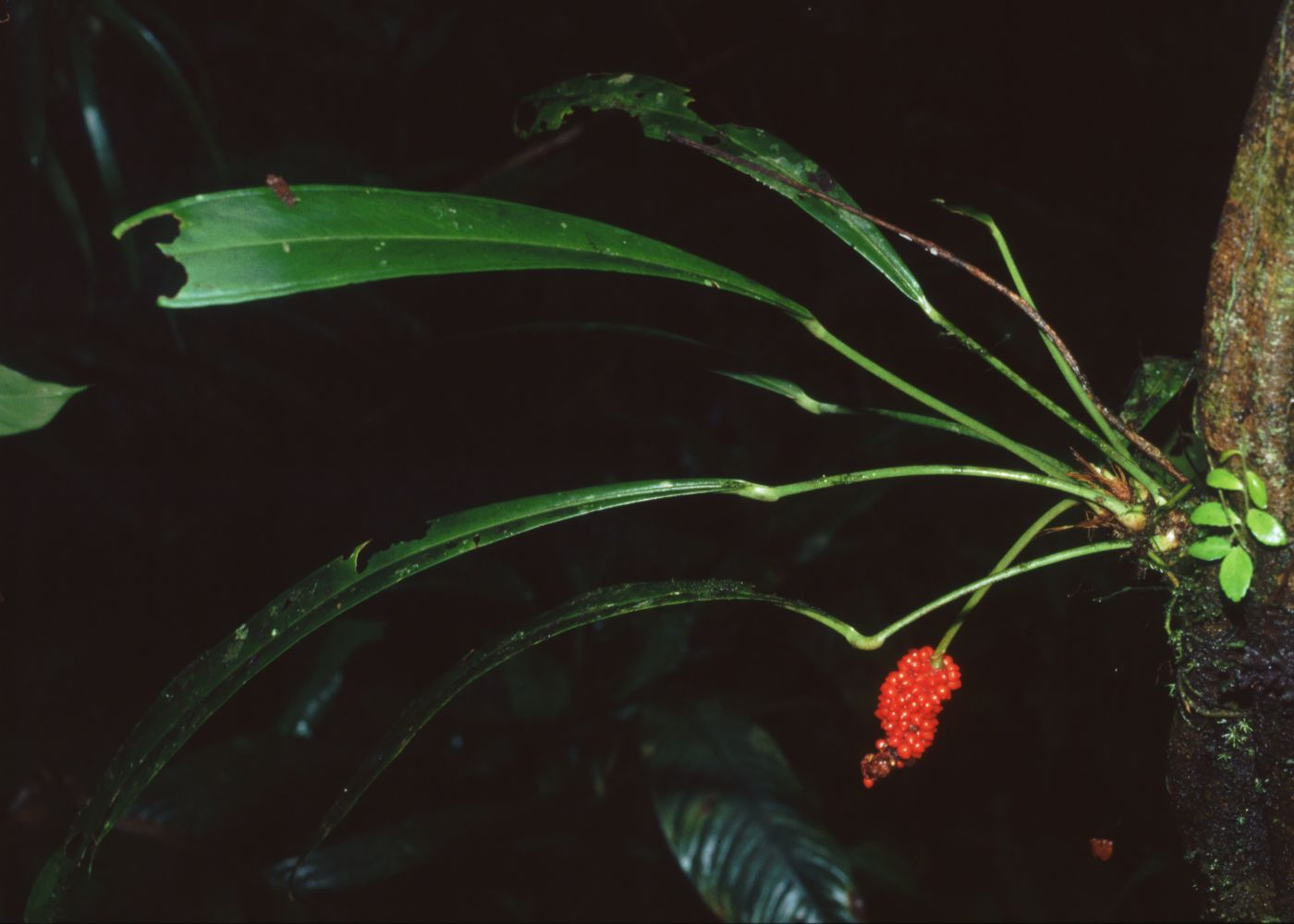
- In the wild in Costa Rica

Scientific classification
- Kingdom: Plantae
- Clade: Embryophytes
- Clade: Tracheophytes
- Clade: Angiosperms
- Clade: Monocots
- Order: Alismatales
- Family: Araceae
- Genus: Anthurium
- Species: A. bakeri

Binomial name
- Anthurium bakeri Hook.f.

Synonyms
- Anthurium angelorum G.S.Bunting; Anthurium turrialbense Engl.

= Anthurium bakeri =

Species of flowering plant

Anthurium bakeri is a species of flowering plant in the family Araceae, found from Chiapas in Mexico through Central America and on to northwestern South America. A semi‑epiphyte with strappy leaves and bright red flowers, it is occasionally sold as a houseplant.
