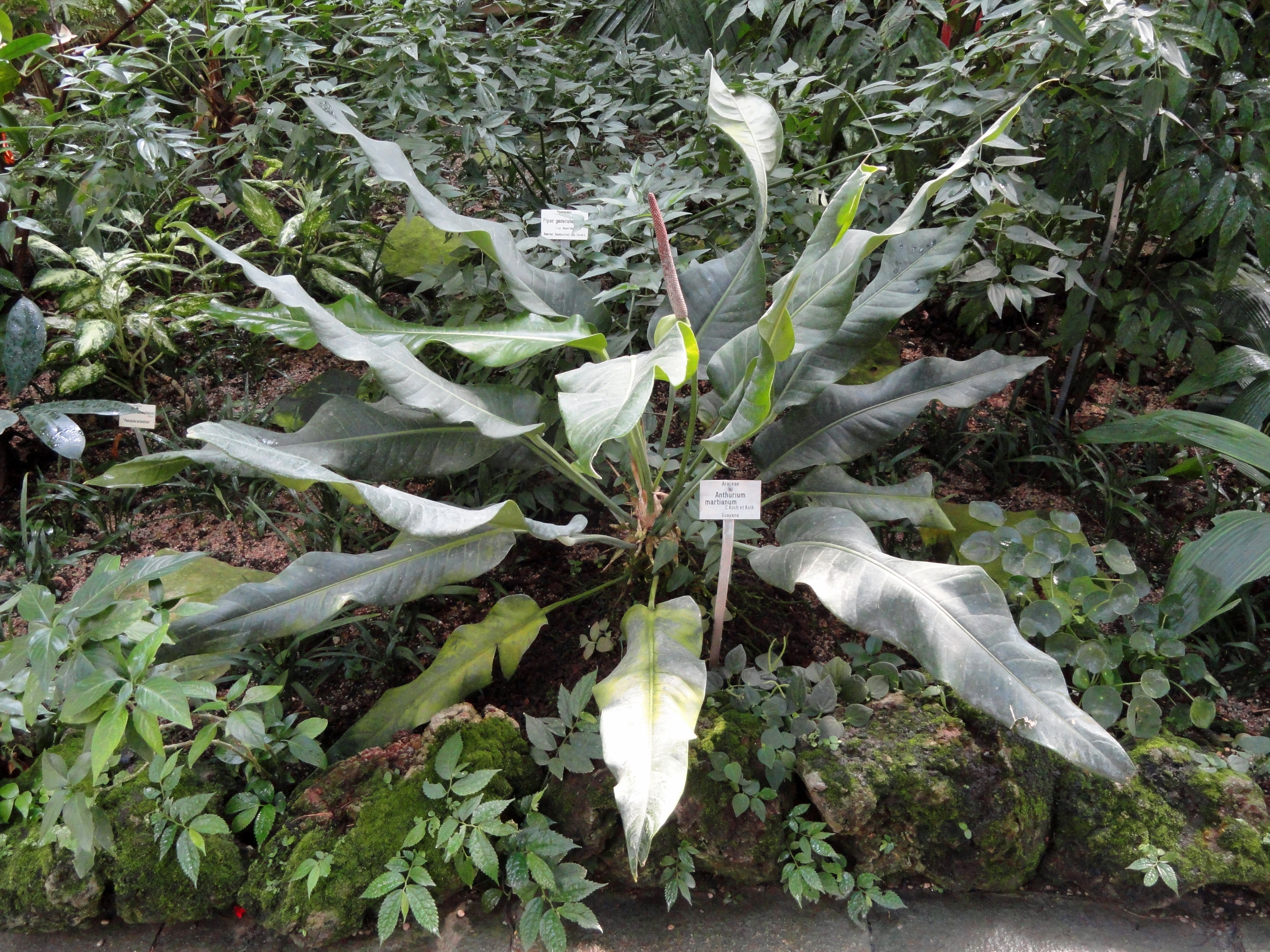

Scientific classification
- Kingdom: Plantae
- Clade: Tracheophytes
- Clade: Angiosperms
- Clade: Monocots
- Order: Alismatales
- Family: Araceae
- Genus: Anthurium
- Species: A. martianum

Binomial name
- Anthurium martianum K.Koch & Kolb

= Anthurium martianum =

Species of flowering plant

Anthurium martianum is a species of Anthurium found in Guyana to Suriname.
