= Anthurium subcoerulescens =

Conservation status
- Vulnerable (IUCN 3.1)

Scientific classification
- Kingdom: Plantae
- Clade: Tracheophytes
- Clade: Angiosperms
- Clade: Monocots
- Order: Alismatales
- Family: Araceae
- Genus: Anthurium
- Species: A. subcoerulescens

Binomial name
- Anthurium subcoerulescens Engl.

Species of flowering plant

Anthurium subcoerulescens is a species of plant in the family Araceae endemic to Ecuador but threatened by habitat loss. Its natural habitats are subtropical or tropical moist lowland forests and subtropical or tropical moist montane forests.
