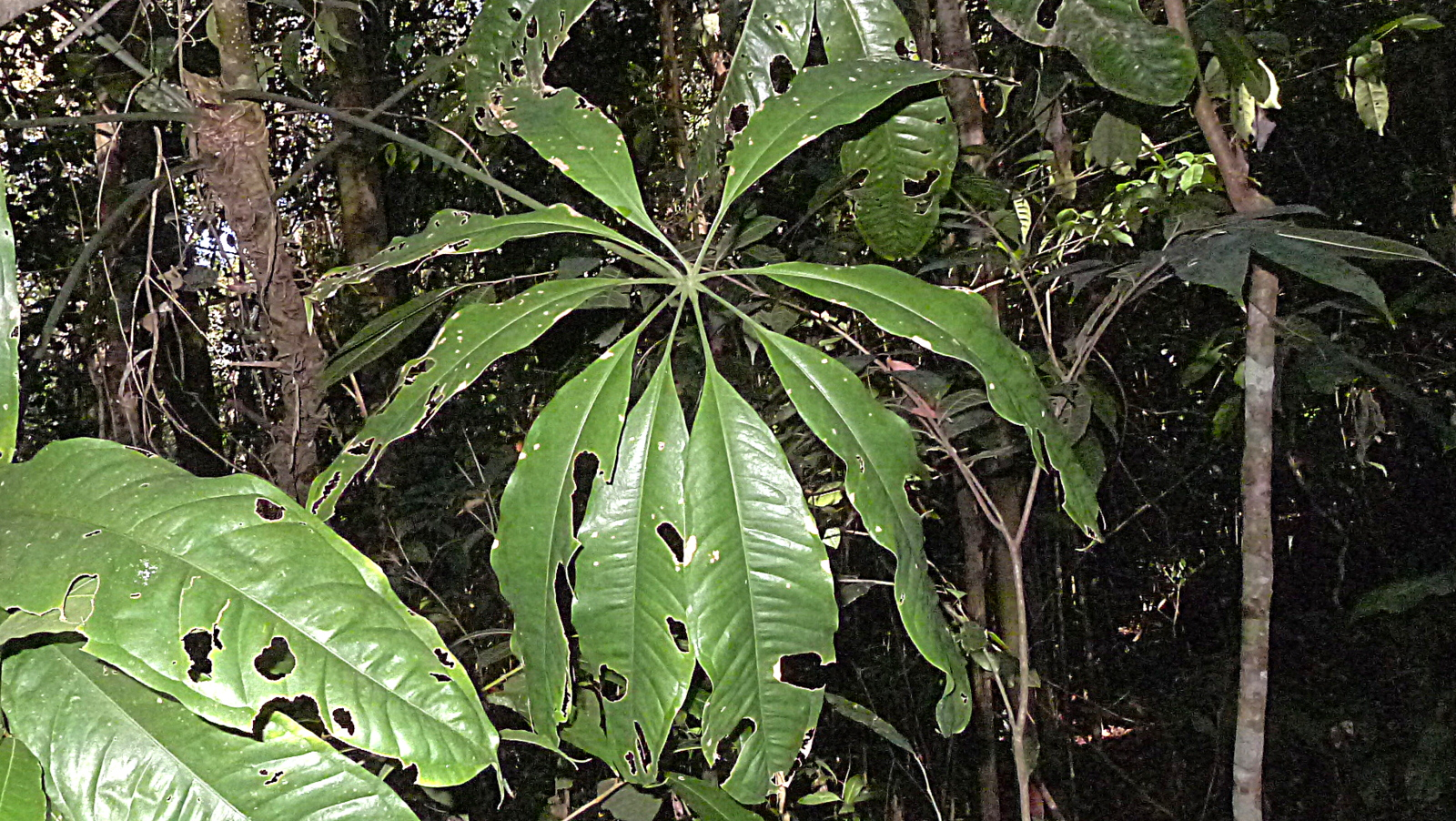

Scientific classification
- Kingdom: Plantae
- Clade: Tracheophytes
- Clade: Angiosperms
- Clade: Monocots
- Order: Alismatales
- Family: Araceae
- Genus: Anthurium
- Species: A. pentaphyllum

Binomial name
- Anthurium pentaphyllum (Aubl.) G.Don

= Anthurium pentaphyllum =

Species of flowering plant

Anthurium pentaphyllum is a species of Anthurium found in Belize, Bolivia, Brazil, Colombia, Costa Rica, Ecuador, French Guiana, Guatemala, Guyana, Honduras, Mexico, Nicaragua, Panamá, Suriname, Trinidad-Tobago, and Venezuela
