= Anthurium manabianum =

Conservation status
- Vulnerable (IUCN 3.1)

Scientific classification
- Kingdom: Plantae
- Clade: Tracheophytes
- Clade: Angiosperms
- Clade: Monocots
- Order: Alismatales
- Family: Araceae
- Genus: Anthurium
- Species: A. manabianum

Binomial name
- Anthurium manabianum Croat

Species of flowering plant

Anthurium manabianum is a species of plant in the family Araceae. It is endemic to Ecuador. Its natural habitat is subtropical or tropical dry forests. It is threatened by habitat loss although efforts are now being made to prevent this.
