= Flamingo lily =

Flamingo lily is a common name for several species of Anthurium with large red spathes.

Flamingo lily may refer to:

- Anthurium andraeanum
- Anthurium scherzerianum
Plants called flamingo lily
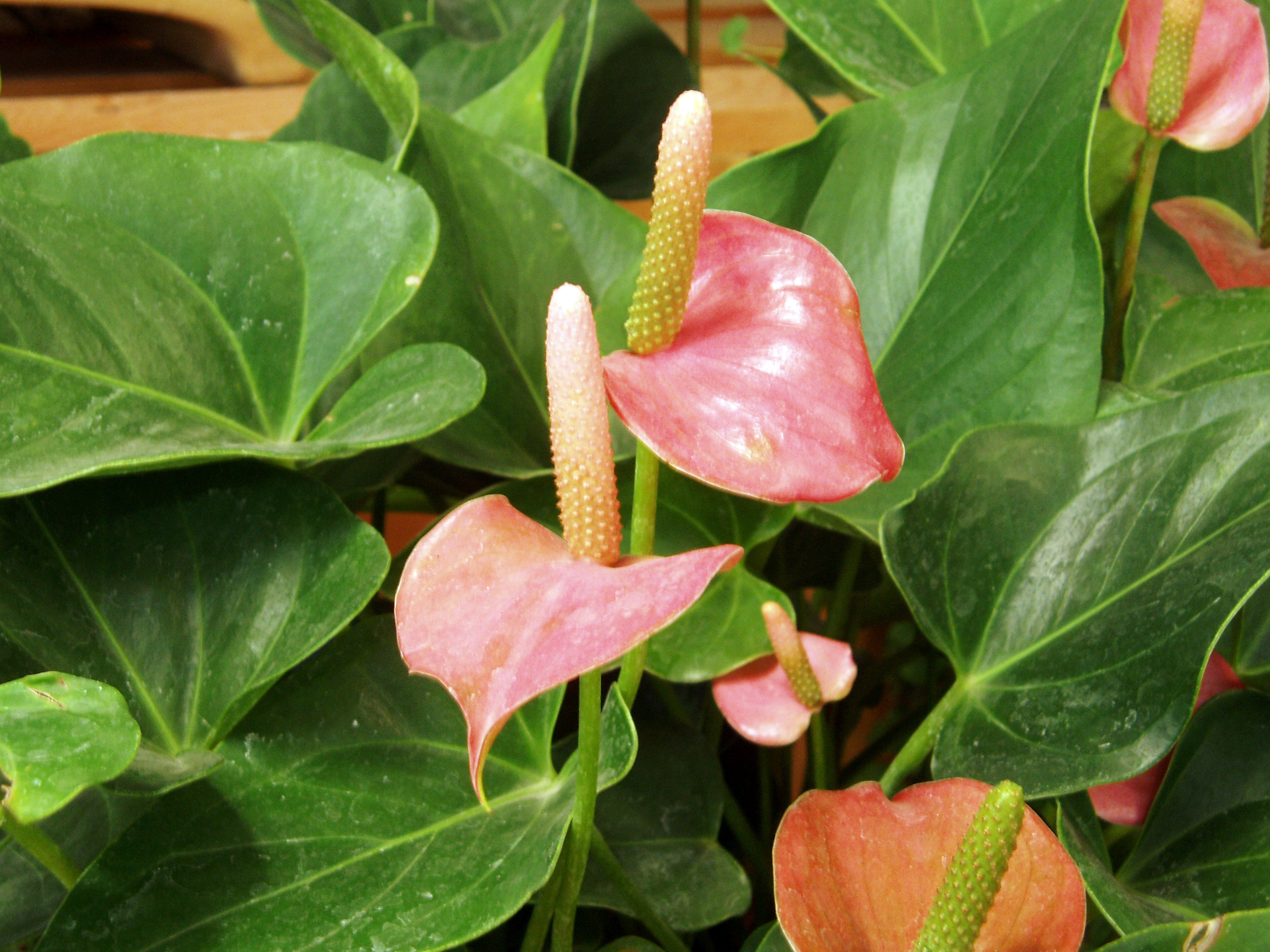
Anthurium andraeanum

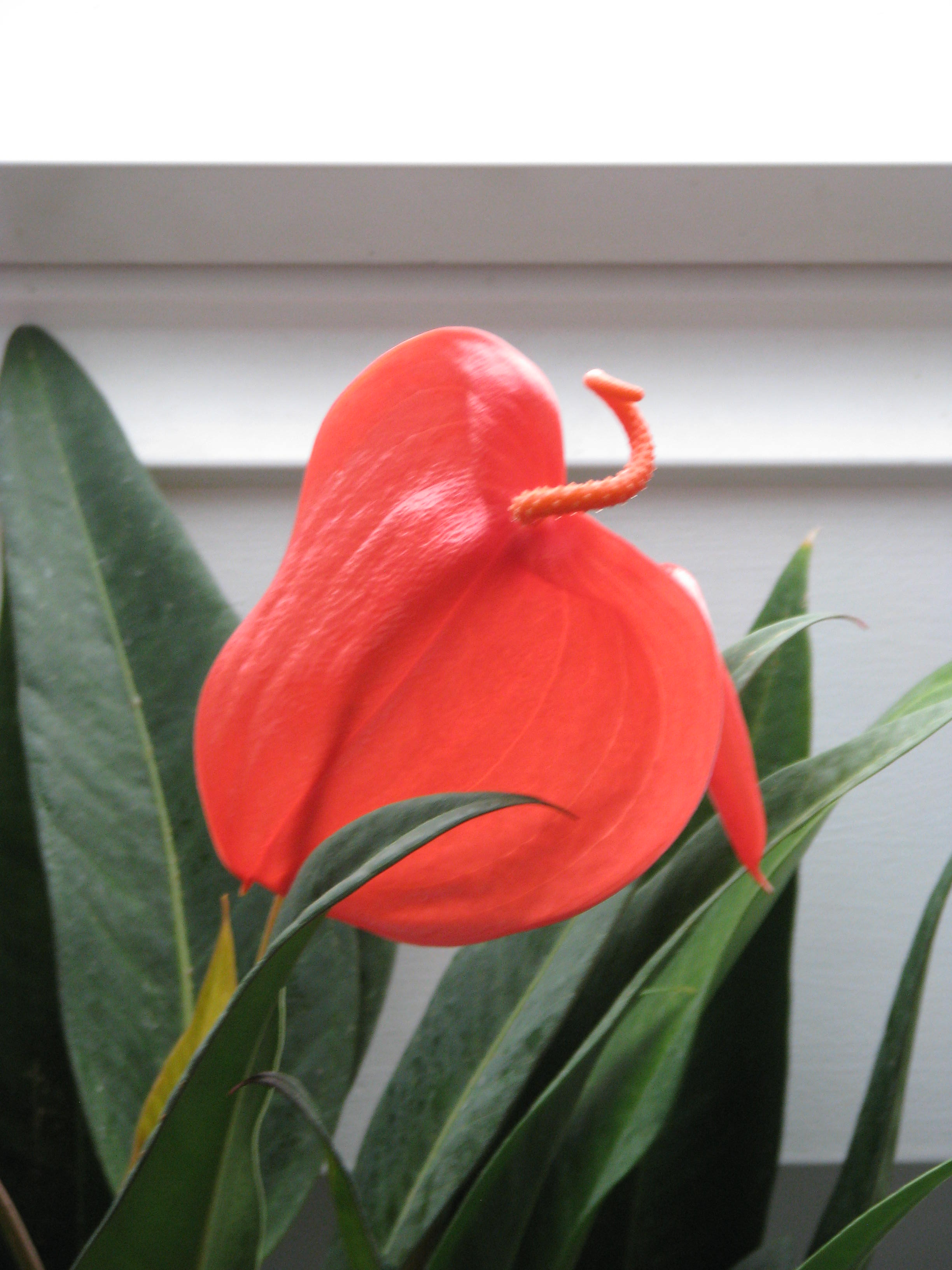
Anthurium scherzerianum
