= Painter's palette =

Painter's palette may refer to:

- Palette (painting), the original sense of the phrase, a rigid, flat surface on which a painter arranges and mixes paints
- The Painter's Palette, a 2003 album by Italian metal band Ephel Duath
- Any of several species of Anthurium, a flowering plant genus in the arum family, including:
  - Anthurium andraeanum, commonly called painter's palette or flamingo flower, the most common referent of these names
  - Anthurium scherzerianum, also commonly called painter's palette or flamingo flower
- A cultivar of Persicaria virginiana, a plant in the knotweed family
- A cultivar of Begonia rex, a plant in the begonia family
