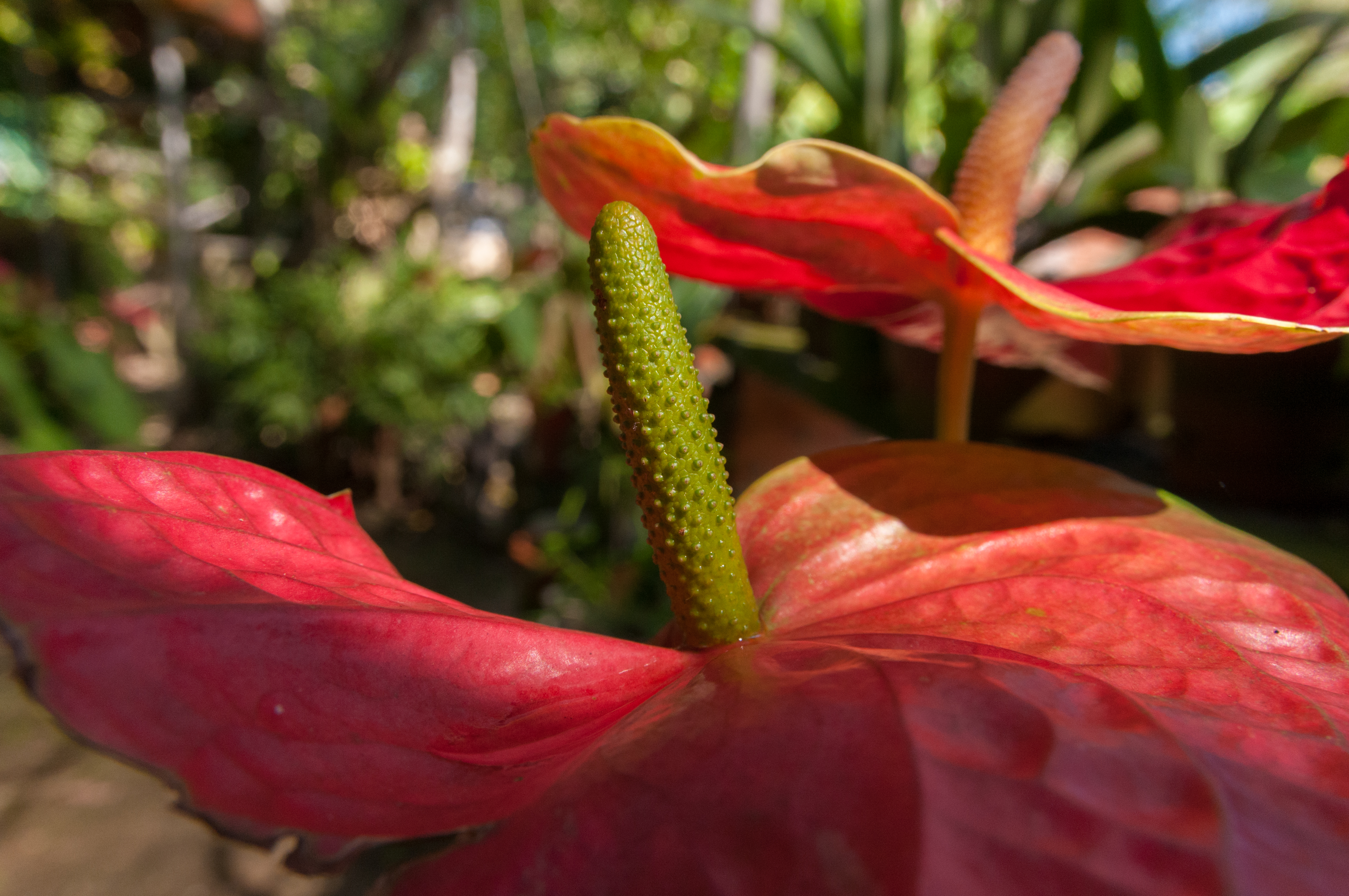

Scientific classification
- Kingdom: Plantae
- Clade: Tracheophytes
- Clade: Angiosperms
- Clade: Monocots
- Order: Alismatales
- Family: Araceae
- Genus: Anthurium
- Species: A. crassinervium

Binomial name
- Anthurium crassinervium (Jacq.) Schott

= Anthurium crassinervium =

Species of flowering plant

Anthurium crassinervium is a species of flowering plant in the family Araceae, native to Venezuela and Colombia in South America, and some Caribbean islands (the Netherlands Antilles, the southwest Caribbean and the Venezuelan Antilles). It was first described by Nikolaus Joseph von Jacquin in 1791 as Pothos crassinervius and transferred to Anthurium in 1829 by Heinrich Wilhelm Schott.
