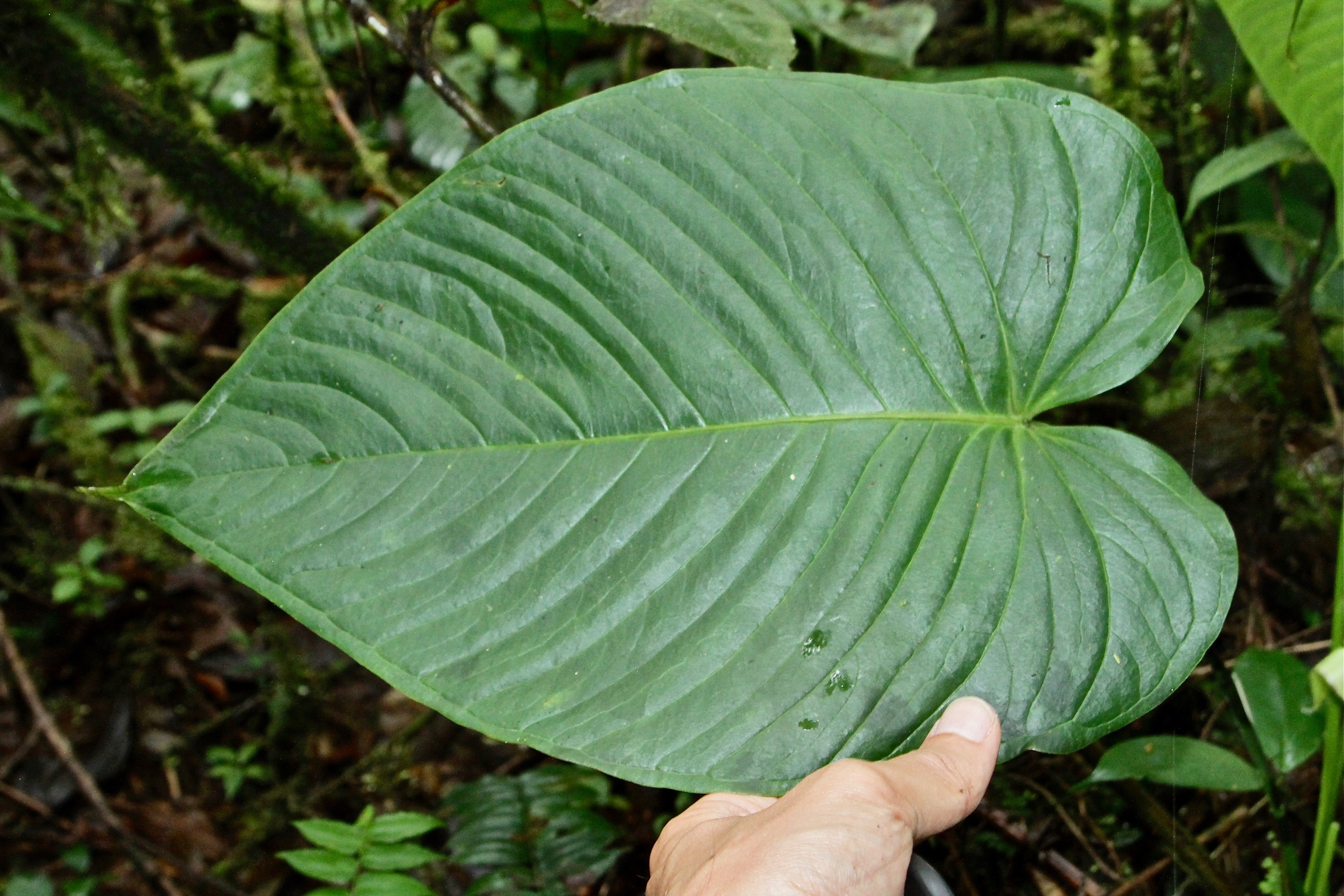
- Anthurium coloradense growing in habitat in Panama

Scientific classification
- Kingdom: Plantae
- Clade: Tracheophytes
- Clade: Angiosperms
- Clade: Monocots
- Order: Alismatales
- Family: Araceae
- Genus: Anthurium
- Species: A. coloradense

Binomial name
- Anthurium coloradense Croat

= Anthurium coloradense =

Species of plant

Anthurium coloradense is a species of plant in the genus Anthurium native to Panama. A member of the section Polyneurium, this terrestrial shrub is most recognizable by its thin, veined leaves and its yellow-green spadix. Its foliage is very similar to other Panamanian species such as Anthurium caperatum, Anthurium santamariae and Anthurium cerrosantiagoense but may be distinguished by details such as the grooves in its stems and the pattern of veining, with the collective vein (running along its leaf margin) growing from the third vein in a leaf.
