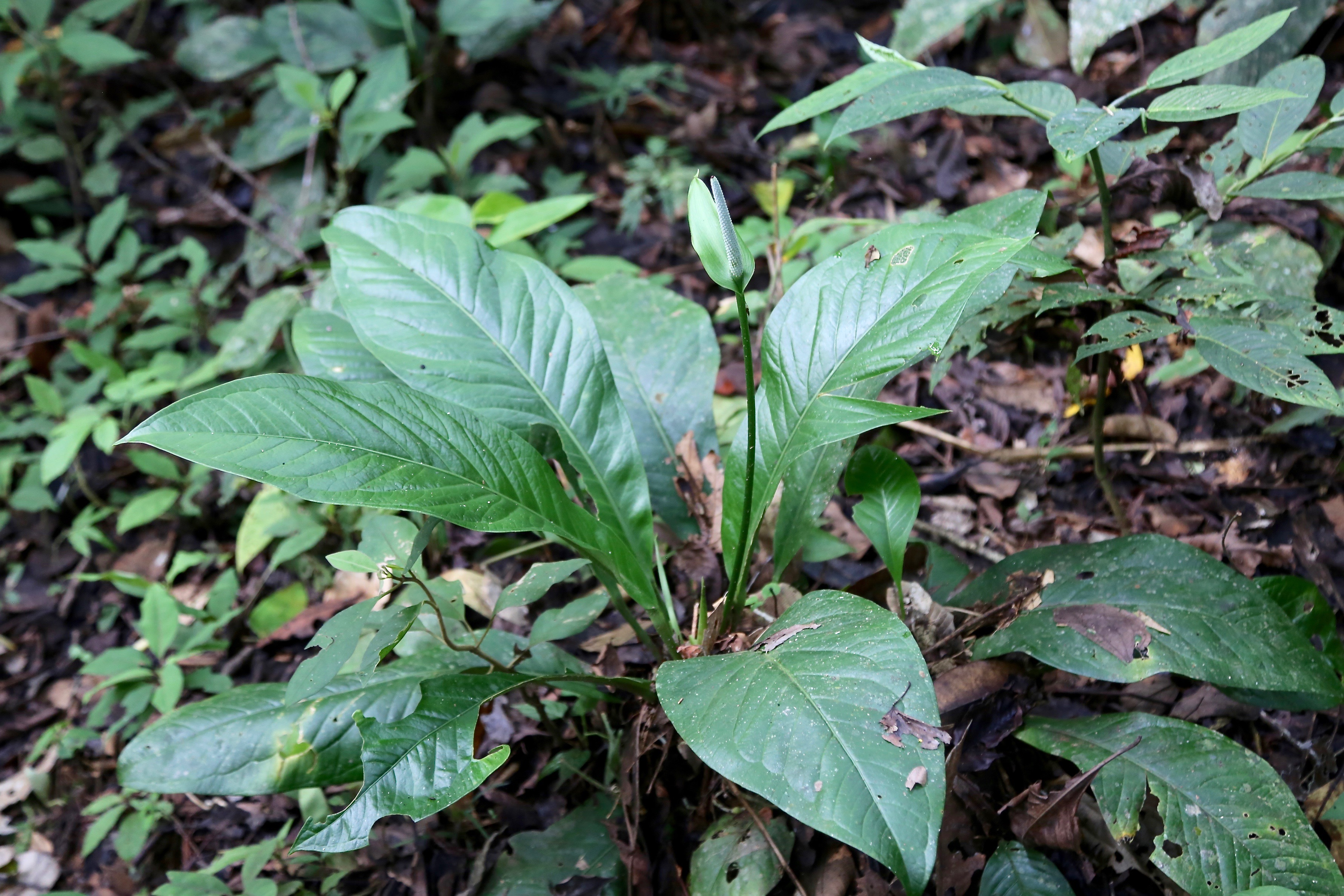
- Anthurium oxycarpum growing in Ecuador

Scientific classification
- Kingdom: Plantae
- Clade: Tracheophytes
- Clade: Angiosperms
- Clade: Monocots
- Order: Alismatales
- Family: Araceae
- Genus: Anthurium
- Species: A. oxycarpum

Binomial name
- Anthurium oxycarpum Poepp.

Synonyms
- Anthurium strictum

= Anthurium oxycarpum =

Species of plant

Anthurium oxycarpum is a species of flowering plant in the genus Anthurium. It can be found in Central and South America from southeast Colombia to Bolivia and northern Brazil. One of the "birds nest" Anthurium species, it grows terrestrially. In its native land, the dried leaves–which smell fragrantly like vanilla and musk when dried–are sometimes smoked or used as snuff.
