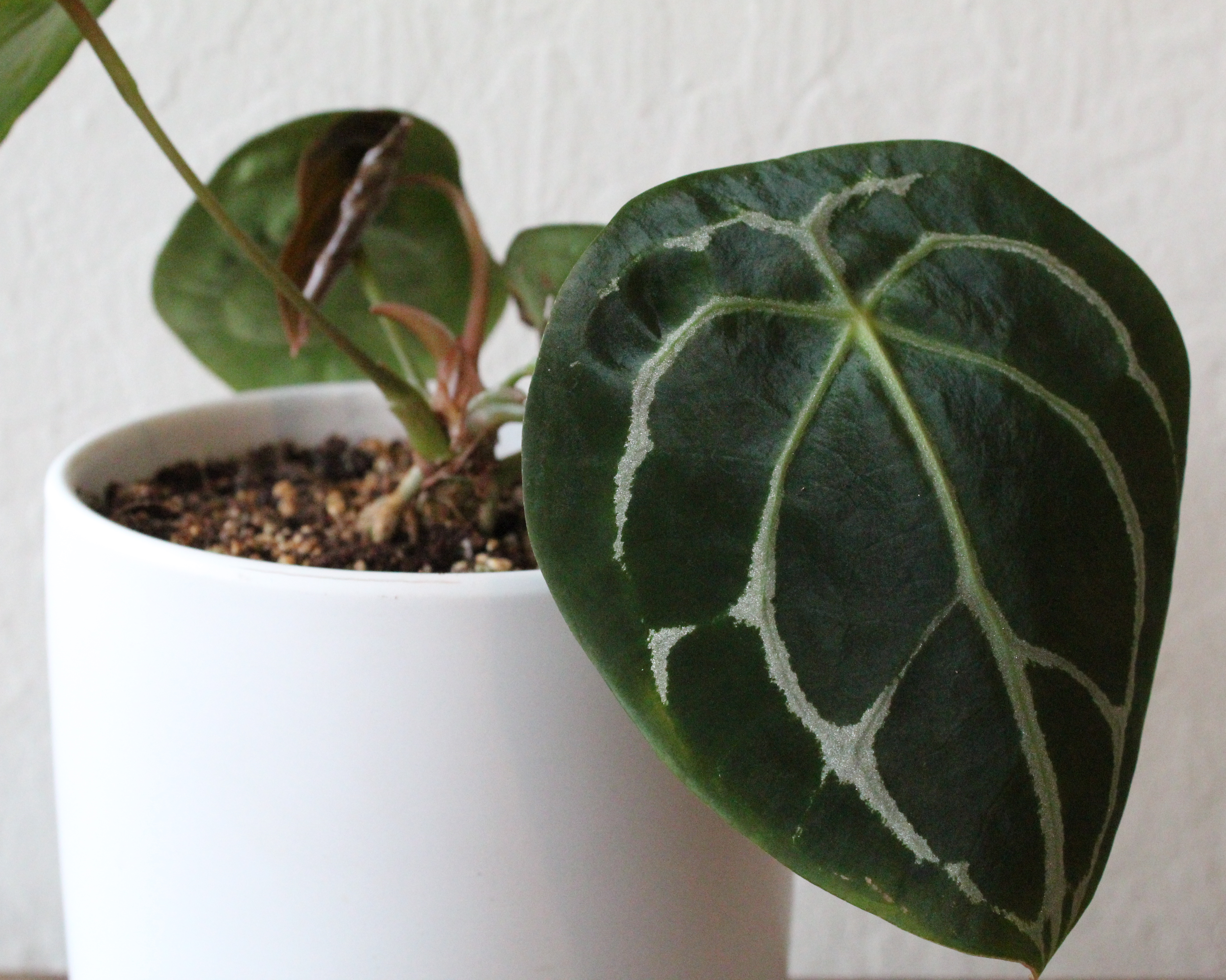
- A. forgetii potted as a houseplant

Scientific classification
- Kingdom: Plantae
- Clade: Tracheophytes
- Clade: Angiosperms
- Clade: Monocots
- Order: Alismatales
- Family: Araceae
- Genus: Anthurium
- Species: A. forgetii

Binomial name
- Anthurium forgetii N.E.Br.

= Anthurium forgetii =

Species of flowering plant

Anthurium forgetii is a species of plant in the genus Anthurium native to Colombia. Kept in cultivation for its round leaves that lack a sinus and have silver veining, it is thought to be epiphytic.
