= Anthurium peltigerum =

Scientific classification
- Kingdom: Plantae
- Clade: Tracheophytes
- Clade: Angiosperms
- Clade: Monocots
- Order: Alismatales
- Family: Araceae
- Genus: Anthurium
- Species: A. peltigerum

Binomial name
- Anthurium peltigerum Sodiro

Species of plant

Anthurium peltigerum is a species of plant in the family Araceae.

== Description ==
The specific epithet peltigerum refers to the peltate leaf, as this is one of only three Anthurium species with this leaf type.

== Range ==
This species occurs in Ecuador, specifically the San Lorenzo region of Esmeraldas Province, and in southwestern Colombia.

== Ecology ==
The inflorescences are visited by flies of the family Drosophilidae, which are attracted to their yeast-like scent.

== Taxonomy ==
This species in section Digitinervium. A cladistic analysis found that it grouped in a clade with Anthurium freidrichsthalii and Anthurium bicollectivum.
