= Anthurium bucayanum =

Conservation status
- Endangered (IUCN 3.1)

Scientific classification
- Kingdom: Plantae
- Clade: Tracheophytes
- Clade: Angiosperms
- Clade: Monocots
- Order: Alismatales
- Family: Araceae
- Genus: Anthurium
- Species: A. bucayanum

Binomial name
- Anthurium bucayanum Croat

Species of flowering plant

Anthurium bucayanum is a species of plant in the arum family, Araceae. It is endemic to Ecuador. It is an epiphyte which grows in coastal forests. It is threatened by habitat fragmentation.
