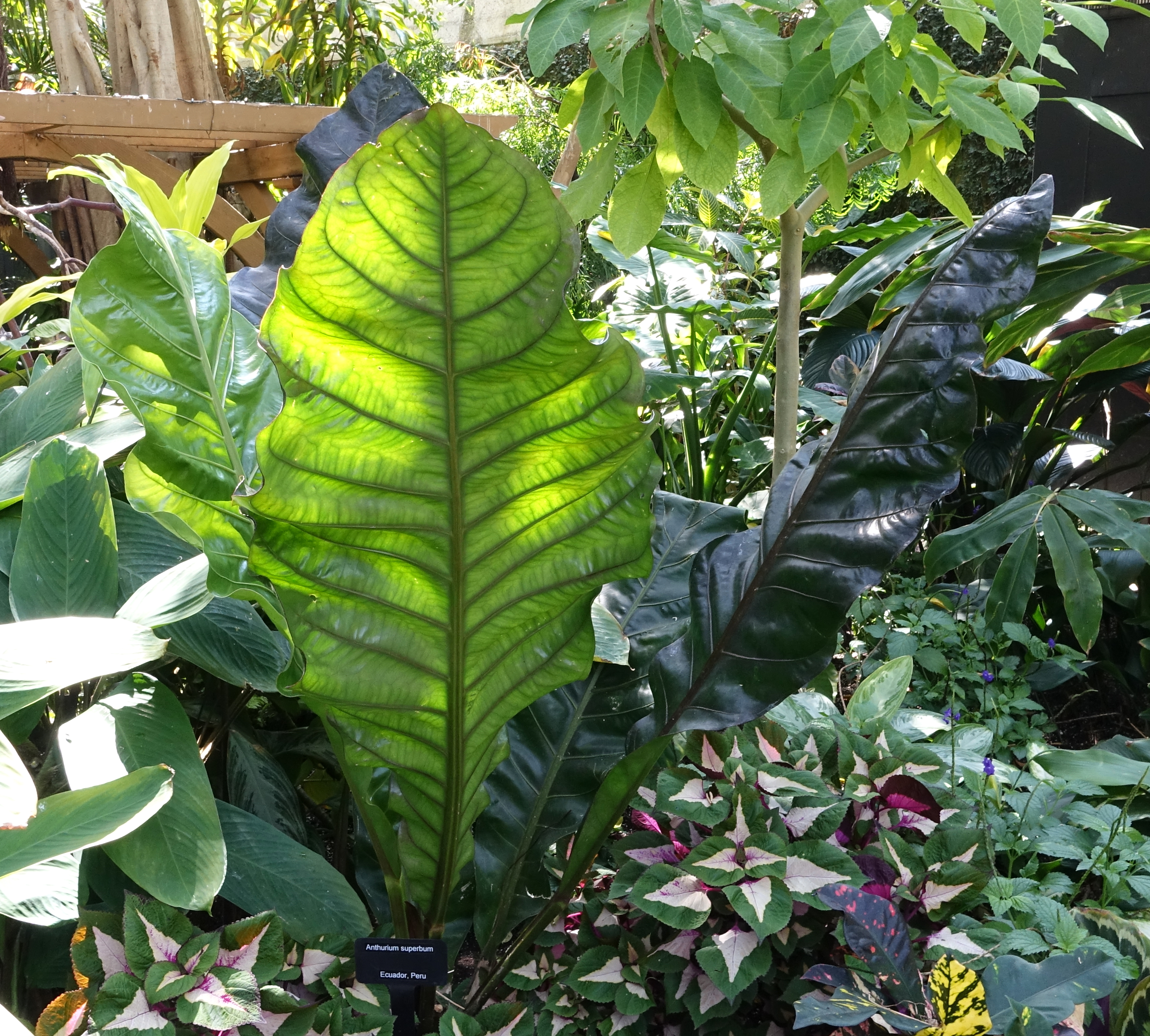

Conservation status
- Vulnerable (IUCN 3.1)

Scientific classification
- Kingdom: Plantae
- Clade: Tracheophytes
- Clade: Angiosperms
- Clade: Monocots
- Order: Alismatales
- Family: Araceae
- Genus: Anthurium
- Species: A. superbum

Binomial name
- Anthurium superbum Madison

= Anthurium superbum =

Species of flowering plant

Anthurium superbum is a species of plant in the family Araceae. It is native plant to and endemic to Ecuador and Peru in western South America. Its natural habitat is subtropical or tropical moist lowland forests. It is threatened by habitat loss.

== Description ==
Like many other anthuriums, it is an epiphyte, which means that it grows on other plants.

The leaves grow straight up. The main stem can be more than 3 centimetres (1.2 in) thick and up to 8 centimetres (3.1 in) long. Thick, rose-colored succulent roots grow from the internodes.

As of 2023, there are two accepted subspecies: Anthurium superbum subsp. brentberlinii Croat and Anthurium superbum subsp. superbum.

== History ==
The first published description was published in 1978 by Michael T. Madison.
