= List of Cotabato provincial symbols =

The following is a list of Cotabato provincial symbols. Most symbols were designated by the virtue of Provincial Ordinance No. 540 which took effect on September 1, 1914.

== Provincial symbols ==
| Type | Symbol | Image |
|---|---|---|
| Bird | Philippine eagle Pithecophaga jefferyi | |
| Tree | Rubber tree Hevea brasiliensis | |
| Fruit | Marang; Artocarpus odoratissimus | |
| Plant | Bamboo; Bambusa vulgaris | |
| Flower | Anthurium; Anthurium andraeanum | |
| Vegetable | Malunggay; Moringa oleifera | |
| Fish | Mudfish; Channa striata | |
| Delicacy | Patil or Pastil | |
| Natural landmark | Mount Apo | |
| Man-made landmark | Fort Pikit | |
