= Anthurium esmeraldense =

Conservation status
- Vulnerable (IUCN 3.1)

Scientific classification
- Kingdom: Plantae
- Clade: Tracheophytes
- Clade: Angiosperms
- Clade: Monocots
- Order: Alismatales
- Family: Araceae
- Genus: Anthurium
- Species: A. esmeraldense

Binomial name
- Anthurium esmeraldense Sodiro

Species of flowering plant

Anthurium esmeraldense is a species of plant in the family Araceae. It is endemic to Ecuador. Its natural habitat is subtropical or tropical moist lowland forests. It is threatened by habitat loss.

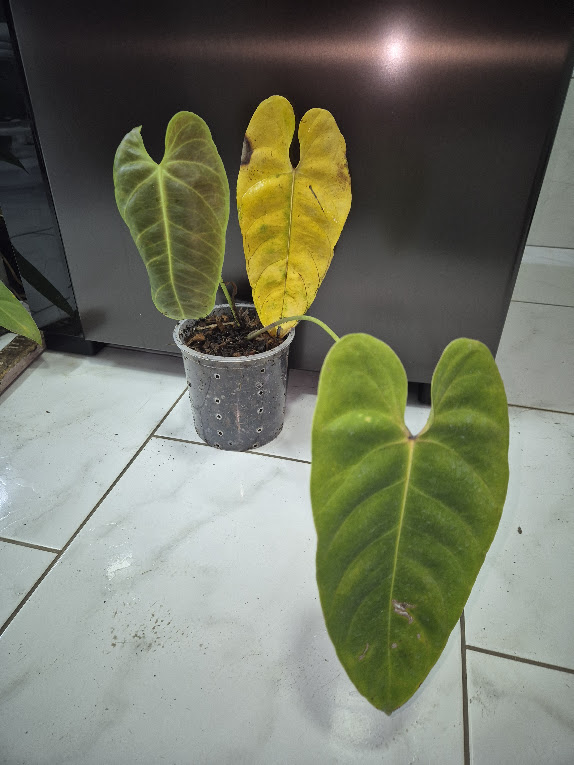
Anthurium Esmeraldense, indoor cultivation, leaves in tree fases, emergent (ochre), adult (green) and ending the cycle (yellow)
