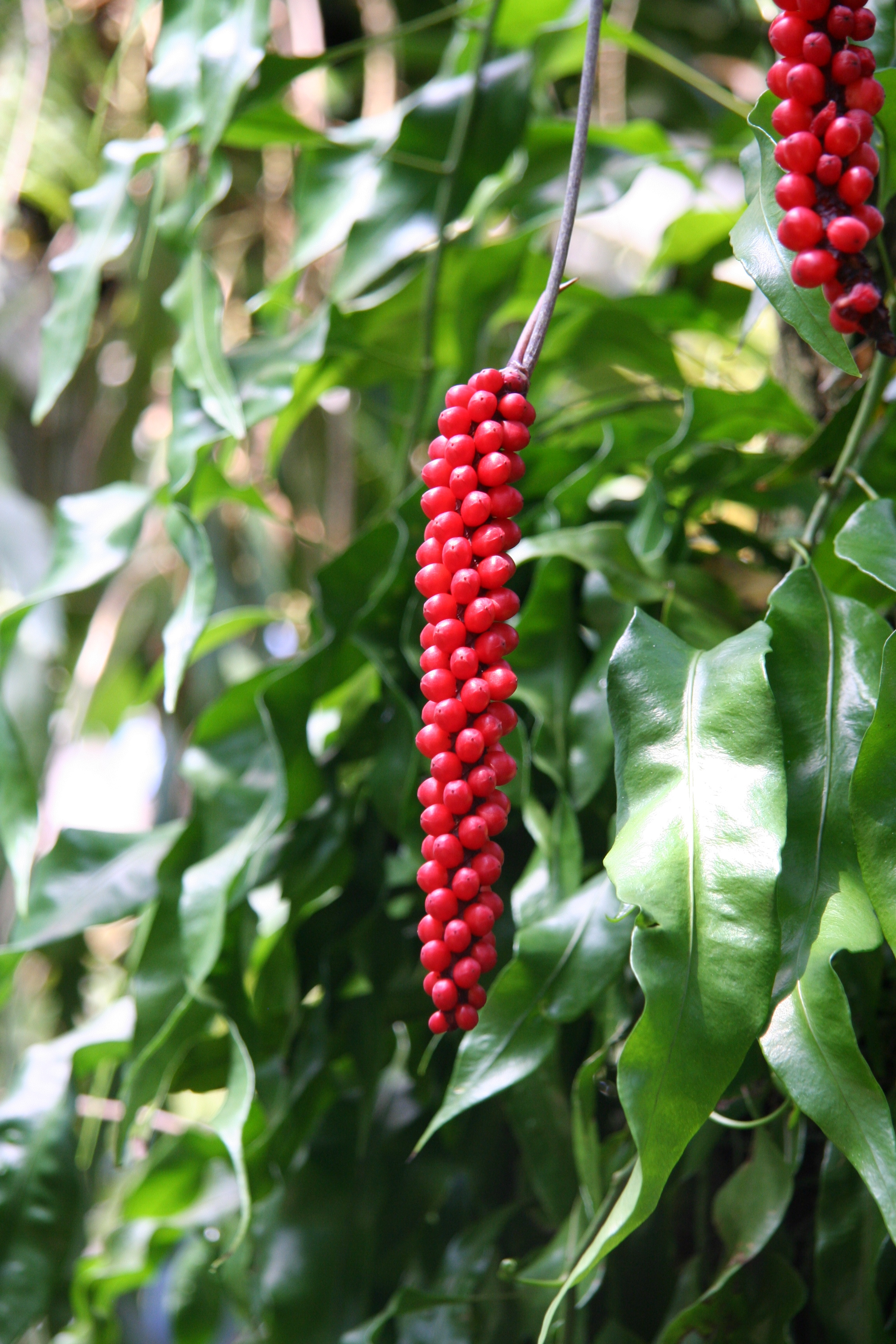
- Fruit
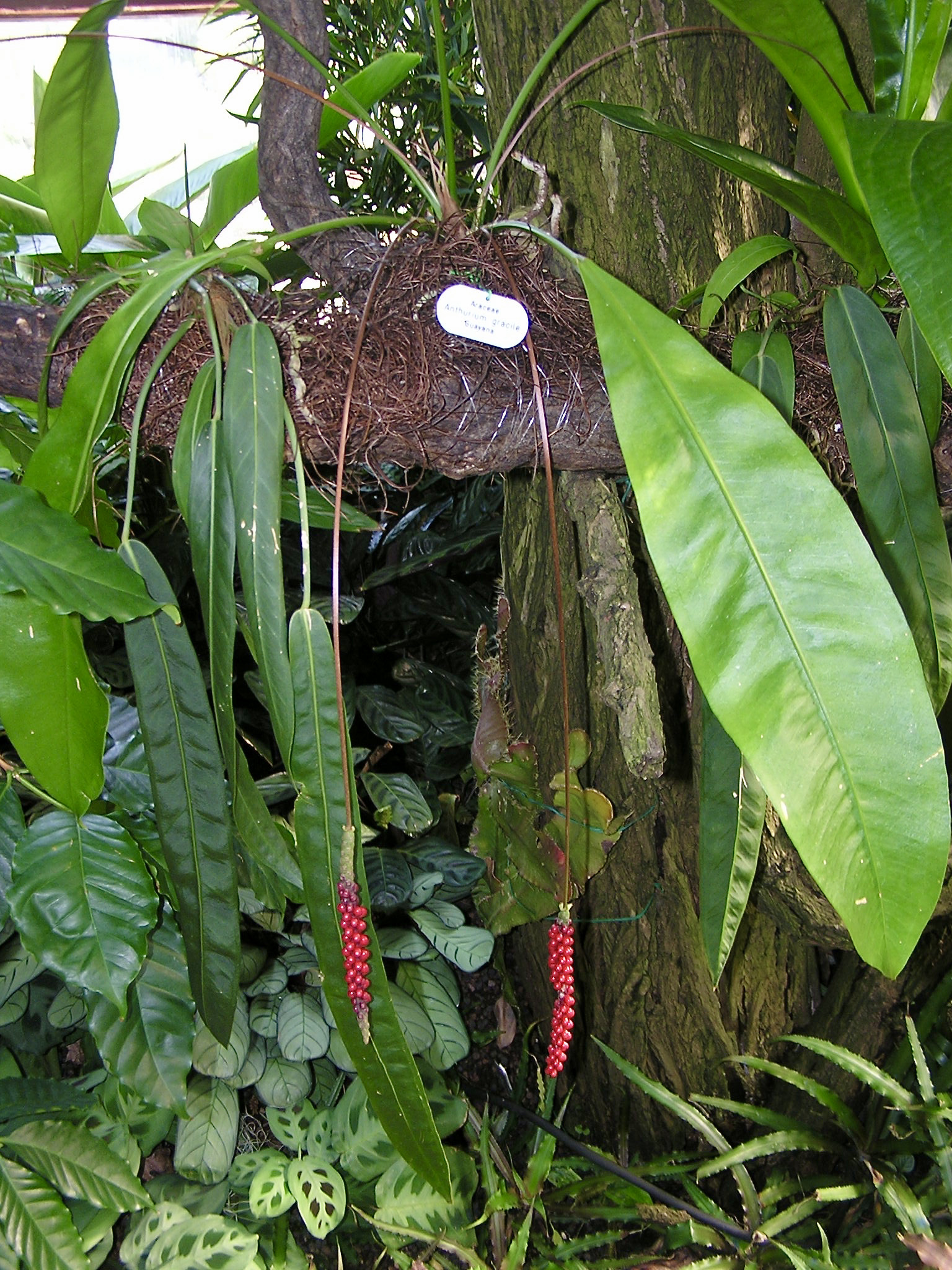
- At the Berggarten

Scientific classification
- Kingdom: Plantae
- Clade: Embryophytes
- Clade: Tracheophytes
- Clade: Angiosperms
- Clade: Monocots
- Order: Alismatales
- Family: Araceae
- Genus: Anthurium
- Species: A. gracile

Binomial name
- Anthurium gracile (Rudge) Lindl.

Synonyms
- List: Anthurium acuminatum Schott; Anthurium belangeri Engl.; Anthurium gracile subsp. belangeri Engl.; Anthurium gracile var. poiteanum (Kunth) Engl.; Anthurium inconditum Schott; Anthurium longipes Matuda; Anthurium macilentum Schott; Anthurium poiteanum Kunth; Anthurium poiteauanum Schott; Anthurium rudgeanum Schott; Anthurium scolopendrinum Kunth; Anthurium scolopendrinum var. belangeri (Engl.) Engl.; Anthurium scolopendrinum var. contractum Engl.; Pothos gracilis Rudge; Pothos scolopendrinus Ham.; Pothos scolopendrioides Desf.

= Anthurium gracile =

Species of flowering plant

Anthurium gracile, the red pearls anthurium, is a species of flowering plant in the family Araceae, native to the American tropics. An epiphyte, when kept as a houseplant it needs excellent drainage.
