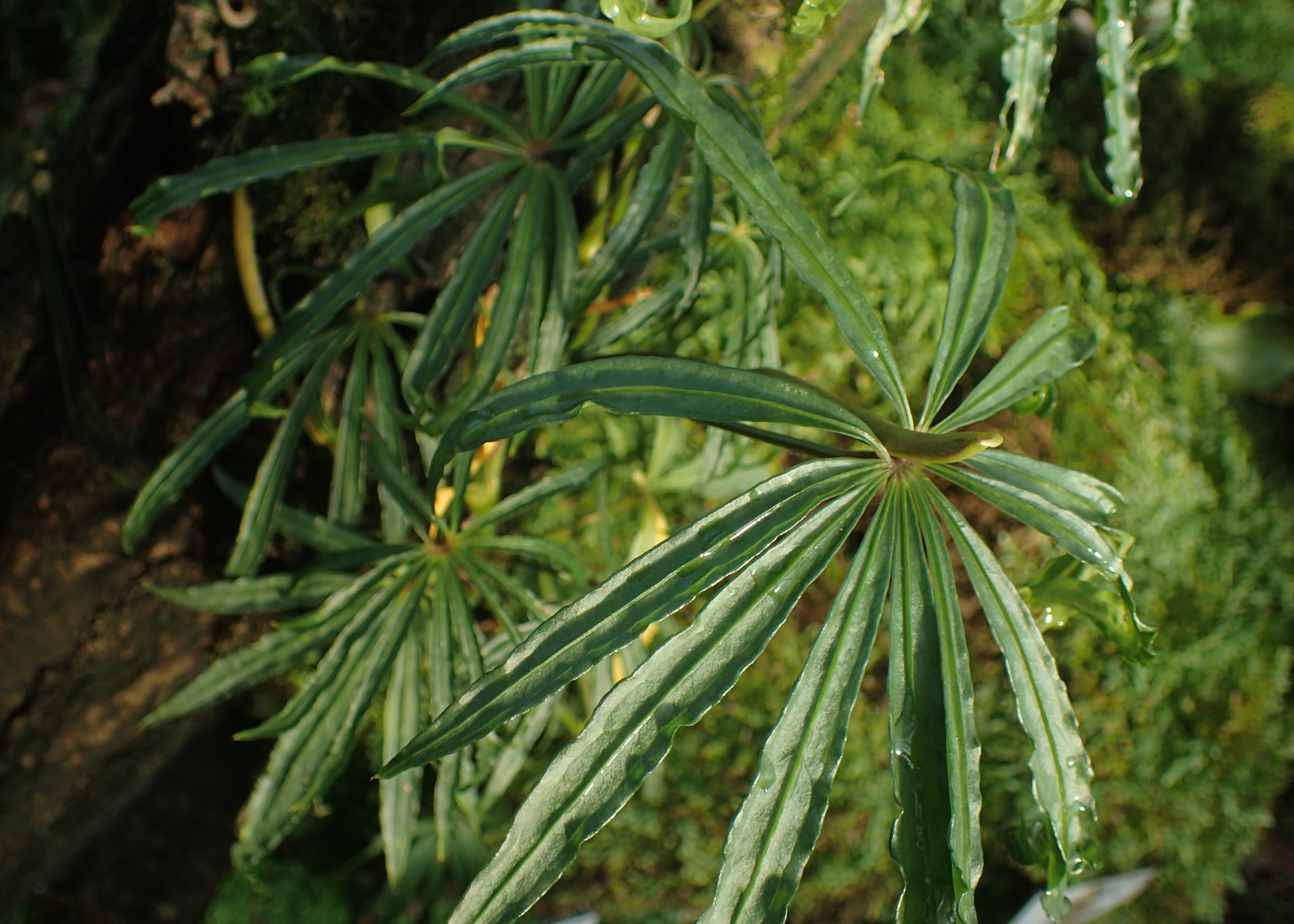

Scientific classification
- Kingdom: Plantae
- Clade: Tracheophytes
- Clade: Angiosperms
- Clade: Monocots
- Order: Alismatales
- Family: Araceae
- Genus: Anthurium
- Species: A. polyschistum

Binomial name
- Anthurium polyschistum R.E.Schult. & Idrobo

= Anthurium polyschistum =

Species of flowering plant

Anthurium polyschistum is a species of Anthurium in Bolivia, Colombia, and Ecuador.
