= Anthurium sect. Gymnopodium =

Scientific classification
- Kingdom: Plantae
- Clade: Tracheophytes
- Clade: Angiosperms
- Clade: Monocots
- Order: Alismatales
- Family: Araceae
- Genus: Anthurium
- Section: Anthurium sect. Gymnopodium

Species
- See text

Group of flowering plants

Gymnopodium is a section within the genus Anthurium. It is composed of the extremely rare Cuban species Anthurium gymnopus. Plants of this section are of somewhat scandent habit, with medium to long internodes, deciduous cataphylls, and somewhat leathery, suborbicular leaf blades. Other notable features include a long inflorescence with a stipitate spadix. The most notable feature is that mature berries contain up to four seeds, rather than the typical two.

The section is poorly studied, and with further genetic testing it may be absorbed into another.
