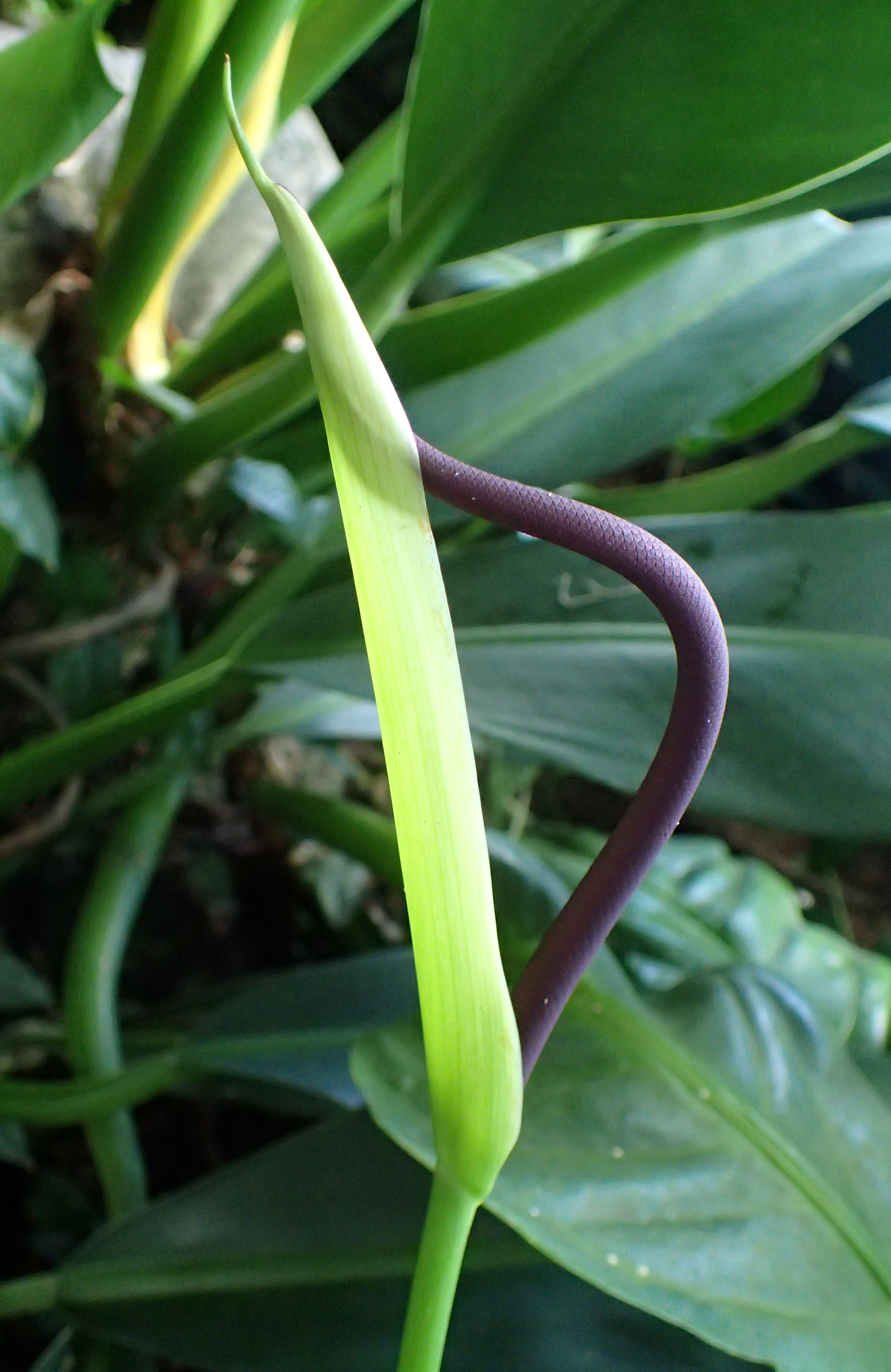
- Anthurium acaule in the New York Botanical Garden

Scientific classification
- Kingdom: Plantae
- Clade: Tracheophytes
- Clade: Angiosperms
- Clade: Monocots
- Order: Alismatales
- Family: Araceae
- Genus: Anthurium
- Species: A. acaule

Binomial name
- Anthurium acaule (Jacq.) Schott

Synonyms
- Pothos acaulis Jacq.

= Anthurium acaule =

Martinican Anthurium

Species of flowering plant

Anthurium acaule, the martinican anthurium, is a herbaceous plant in the family Araceae. It is endemic to Martinique. The plant has a complicated taxonomic history, and the name Anthurium acaule has been applied to several other plants.

== Description ==
Anthurium acaule is epiphytic or rupicolous. Petiole length is 2–6 cm; leaf blades are unlobed, measuring between 40–56 cm (occasionally to 1.3 m) in length and 8–10 cm in width. Young berries are green. Peduncle is green with minute brown speckling and 28–29 cm in length. Spathe is 8–11 cm in length while spadix is 9–15 cm in length.
