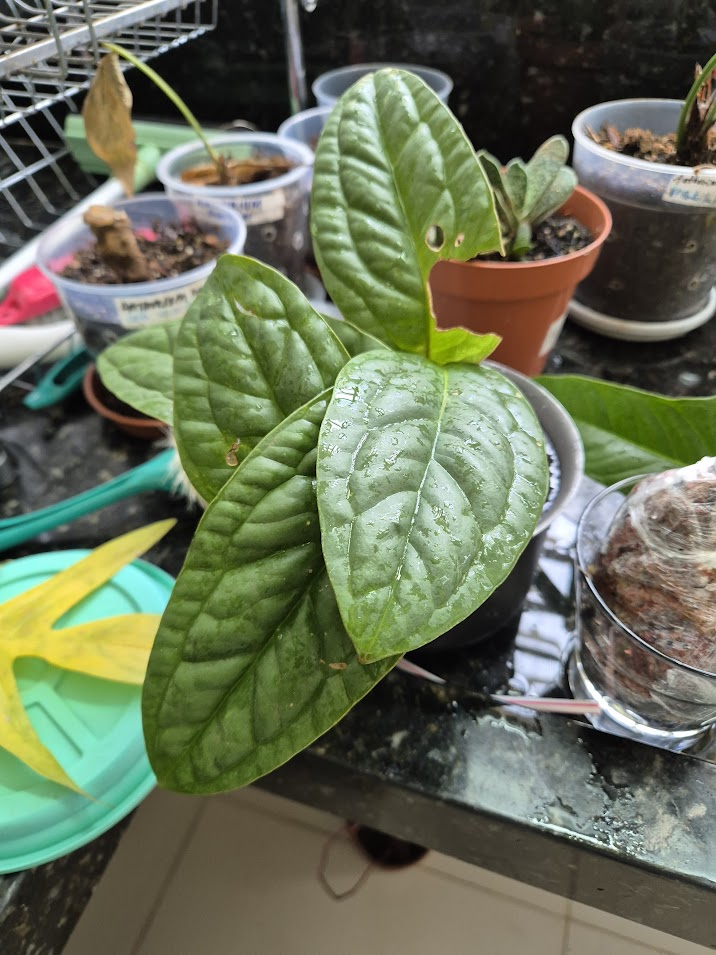

Scientific classification
- Kingdom: Plantae
- Clade: Embryophytes
- Clade: Tracheophytes
- Clade: Spermatophytes
- Clade: Angiosperms
- Clade: Monocots
- Order: Alismatales
- Family: Araceae
- Genus: Anthurium
- Species: A. radicans

Binomial name
- Anthurium radicans K.Koch & Haage

Synonyms
- Anthurium malyi F.Maximilian ex Schott

= Anthurium radicans =

Species of plant

Anthurium radicans, the trailing anthurium, is a species of flowering plant in the family Araceae. A climber, it is native to wetter areas of eastern Brazil. Its unusual flower morphology led to it being placed in its own section, Chamaerepium, but this has been refuted by molecular analysis. Available from specialist nurseries, it is valued as an indoor ornamental for its trailing habit and attractive foliage.
