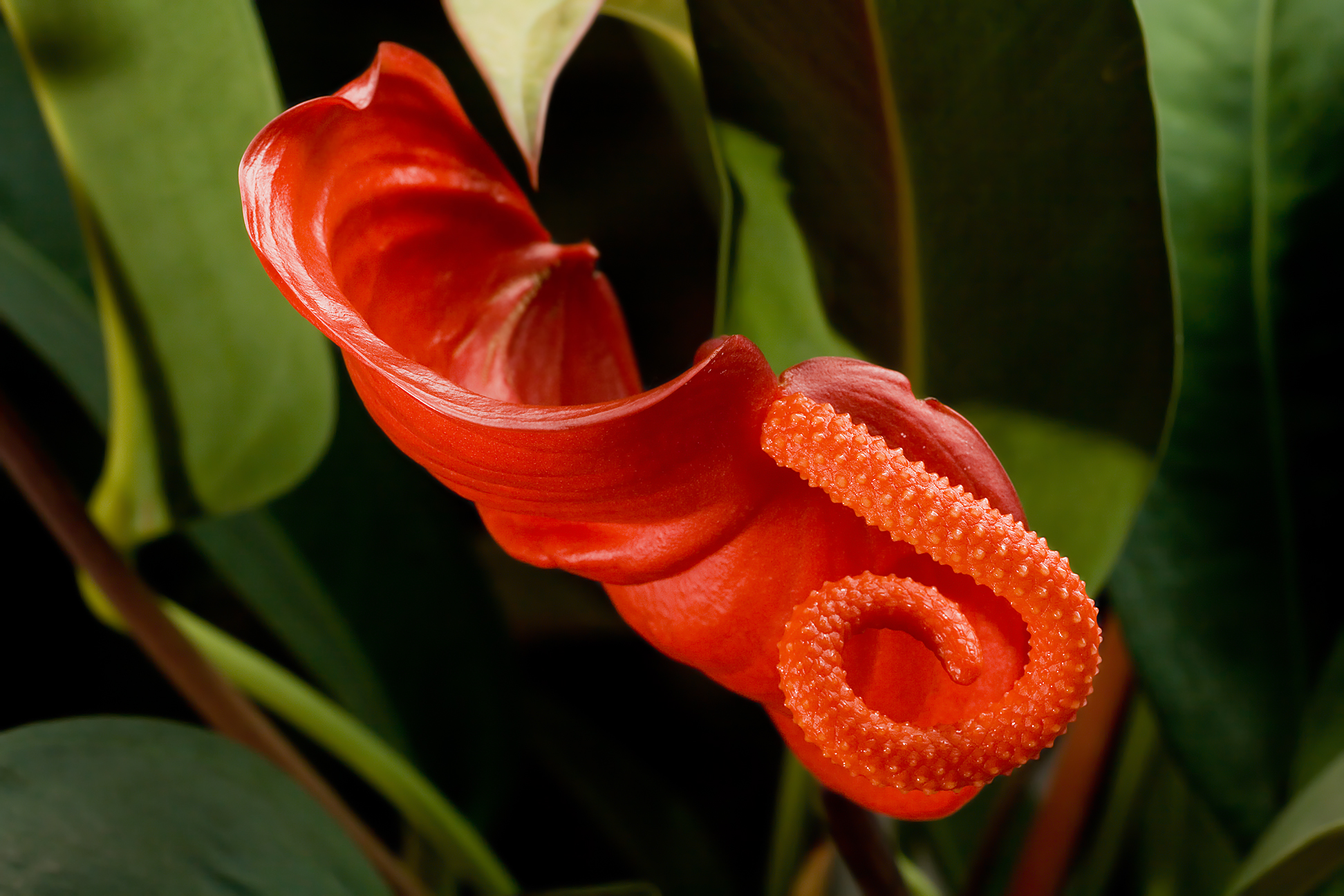

Scientific classification
- Kingdom: Plantae
- Clade: Embryophytes
- Clade: Tracheophytes
- Clade: Angiosperms
- Clade: Monocots
- Order: Alismatales
- Family: Araceae
- Genus: Anthurium
- Species: A. scherzerianum

Binomial name
- Anthurium scherzerianum Schott

Synonyms
- List: Anthurium scherzerianum var. atrosanguineum Engl.; Anthurium scherzerianum var. carnotianum Engl.; Anthurium scherzerianum var. eburneum Engl.; Anthurium scherzerianum var. foliatum Engl.; Anthurium scherzerianum var. gallicum Engl.; Anthurium scherzerianum var. gandavense Engl.; Anthurium scherzerianum var. giganteum Engl.; Anthurium scherzerianum var. rotundispathaceum Engl.; Anthurium scherzerianum var. stipitatum Engl.; Anthurium scherzerianum var. vallerandiae Engl.; Anthurium scherzerianum var. viridescens Engl.; Anthurium scherzerianum var. viridimaculata Engl.

= Anthurium scherzerianum =

Species of flowering plant

Anthurium scherzerianum, the flamingo flower or pigtail plant, is a species of Anthurium (family Araceae) native to Costa Rica. It has gained the Royal Horticultural Society's Award of Garden Merit as an ornamental houseplant, kept at 15 °C (60 °F) or higher. It is naturally an epiphyte, growing on trees in the rainforest.

Anthurium scherzerianum typically reaches 30–45 cm (12–18 in) tall. Its most striking feature is its orange-red curly spadix. It produces shiny, lance-shaped leaves about 20 cm (8 in) long. Common pests include mealybugs, aphids, and soft scale. When growing indoors, it needs bright indirect sunlight for 10 to 12 hours a day depending on the season. If the light is not bright enough, the number of flowers (flower density) will be diminished greatly. While often grown as a houseplant, it may be grown outdoors in the US in USDA hardiness zones 11 and 12.
