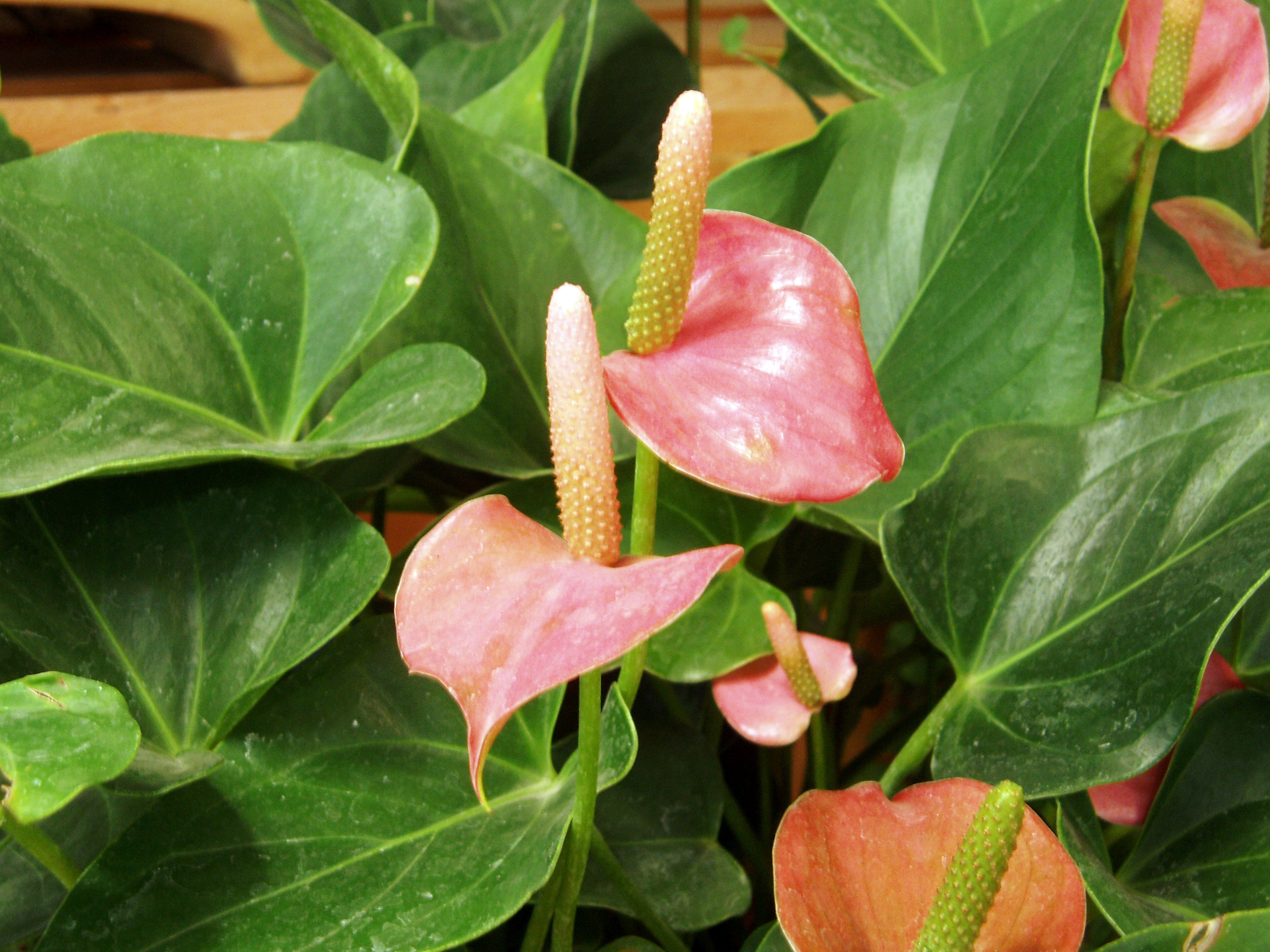

Scientific classification
- Kingdom: Plantae
- Clade: Embryophytes
- Clade: Tracheophytes
- Clade: Spermatophytes
- Clade: Angiosperms
- Clade: Monocots
- Order: Alismatales
- Family: Araceae
- Genus: Anthurium
- Species: A. andraeanum

Binomial name
- Anthurium andraeanum Linden ex André

Synonyms
- Anthurium venustum Sodiro

= Anthurium andraeanum =

Species of plant

Anthurium andraeanum, also known as Édouard François André's Tailflower, is a flowering plant species in the family Araceae that is native to Colombia and Ecuador. It is a winner of the Royal Horticultural Society's Award of Garden Merit.

== Names ==
Common names for plants in the genus Anthurium include flamingo flower, tailflower, painter's palette, oilcloth flower, and laceleaf. Its name comes from the Greek words anthos, meaning flower, and oura, meaning a tail, referring to the spadix.

== Description ==
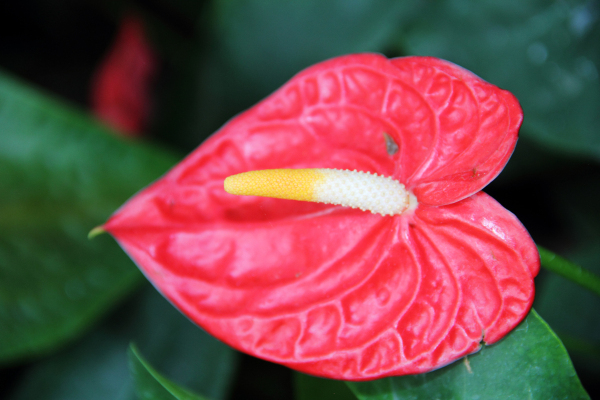
Spathe closeup

It is a monocotyledonous perennial, preferring warm, shady and humid climates, such as tropical rainforests. Its most characteristic feature as an ornamental is its brightly colored spathe leaf, and the protruding inflorescence called the spadix.

It is a short erected plant with whole, cardioid or heart-shaped leaves, generally reflexed, cordate base, apex acuminate or cuspid, which are borne by a cylindrical petiole 30–40 cm long.

The spathe is cartilage-waxy, brightly coloured (red, pink) and 8–15 cm long, excluding the inflorescence (the spadix), which is 7–9 cm long, similar to a candle-holder, white or yellow in colour, is erected, and bears many small hermaphroditic flowers. These include a perianth with four segments and stamens with a compressed mesh. Flowering extends throughout the year.

The fruit is a fleshy berry.

== Distribution ==
Native to Ecuador and southwestern Colombia, it is also naturalised in other parts of the world. It is found in the Caribbean and Réunion. It is grown as an ornamental plant in the form of many hybrids or horticultural varieties. It is commonly used to make bouquets.

== Toxicity ==
The whole plant is toxic. It contains saponins and crystals of calcium oxalate, in fine needles, able to penetrate the mucous membranes and provokes painful irritations. It is toxic to all mammals: a mouth-worn fragment can cause severe irritation of the mouth and throat. Contact with a human causes erythema, blisters, and if ingested, salivation, difficulty in swallowing and vomiting.

== Gallery ==
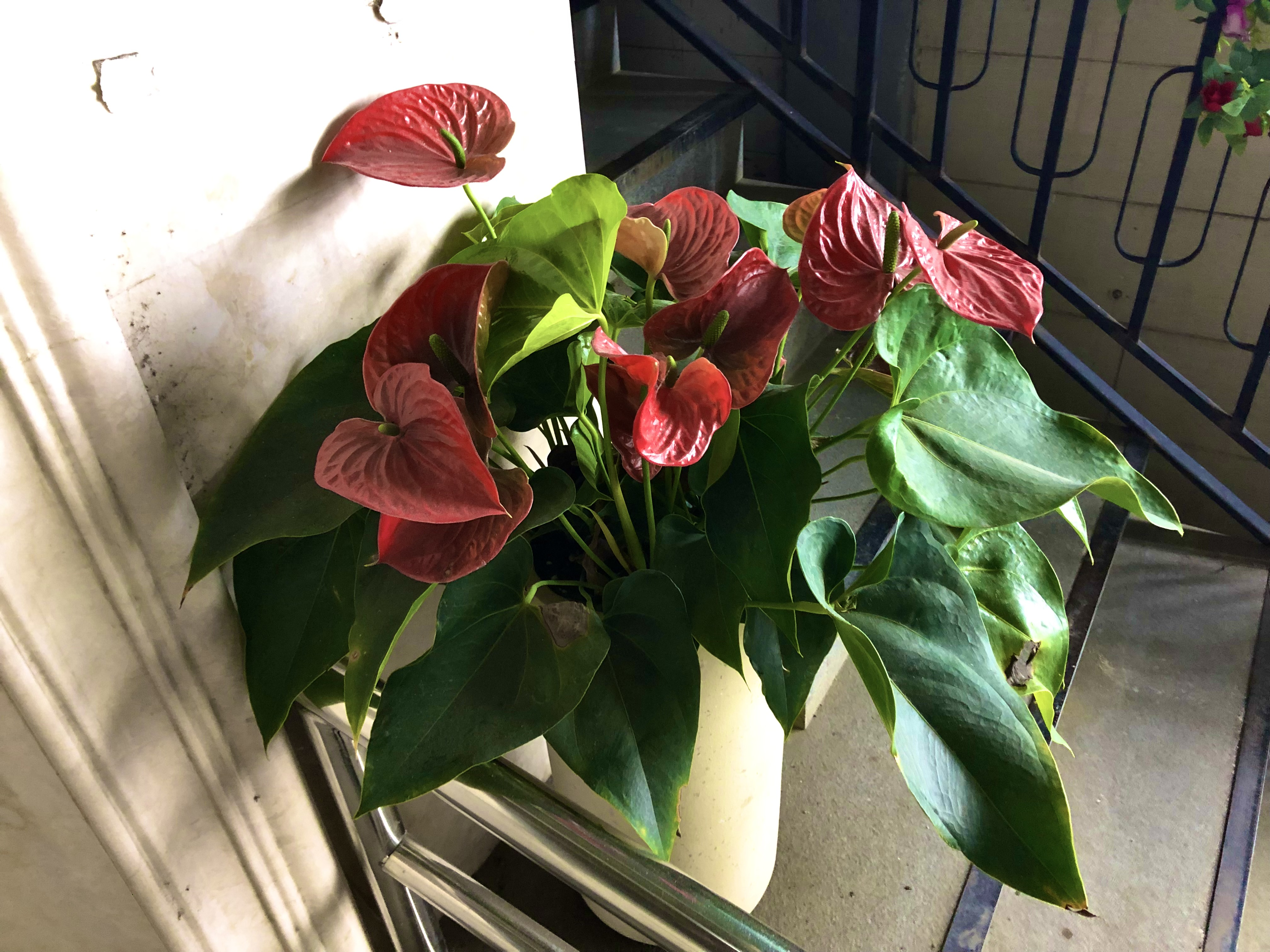

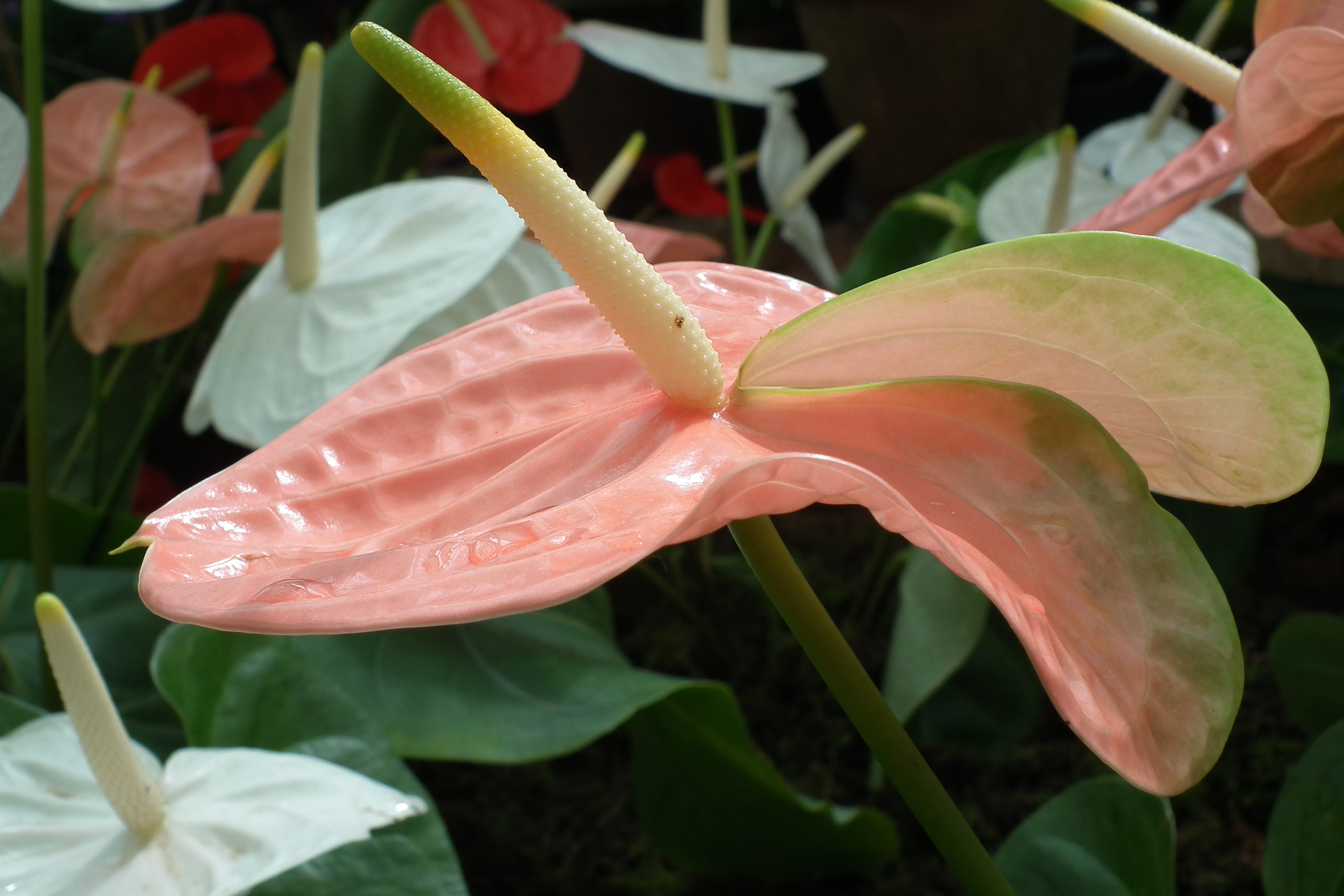

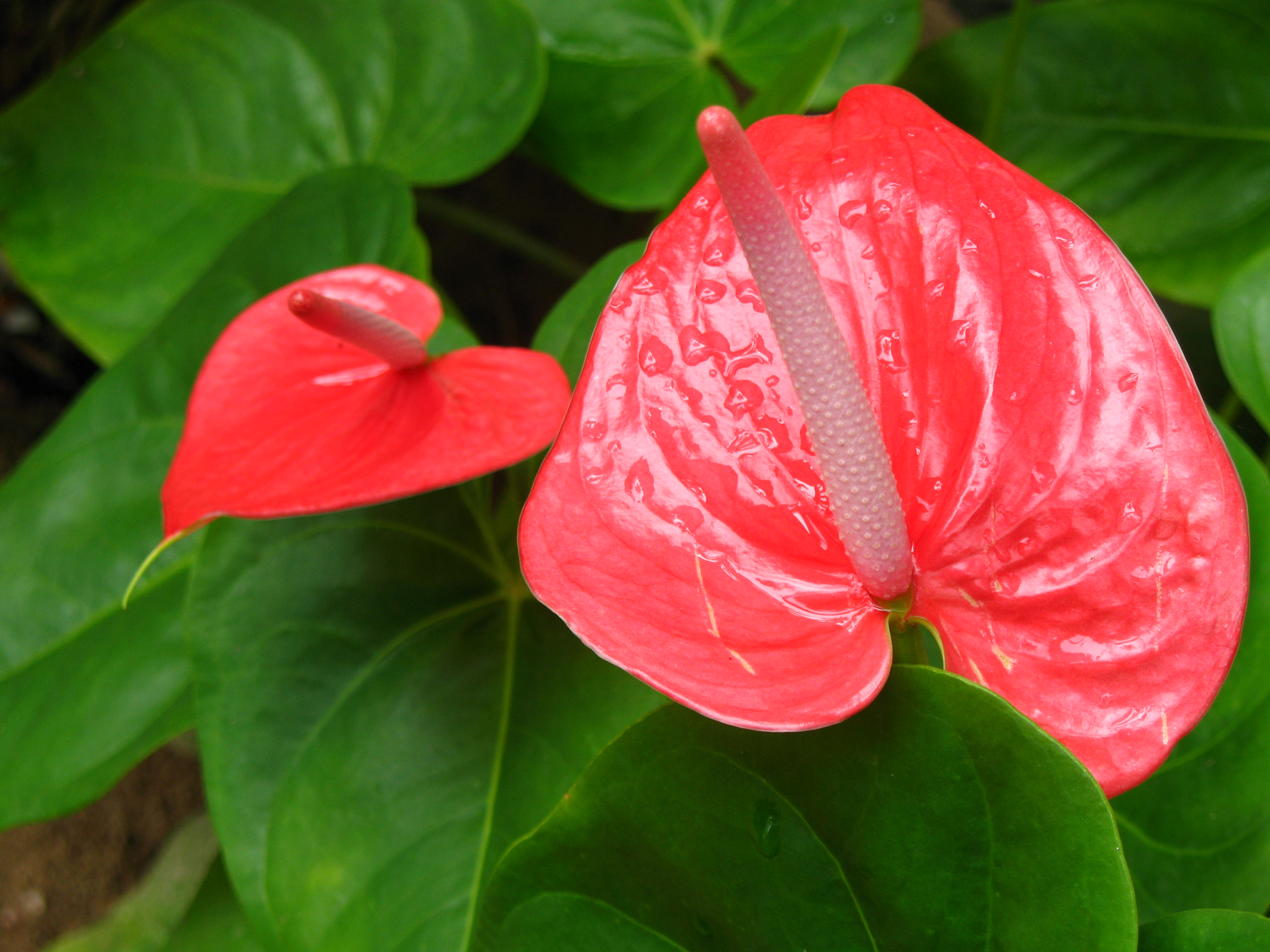

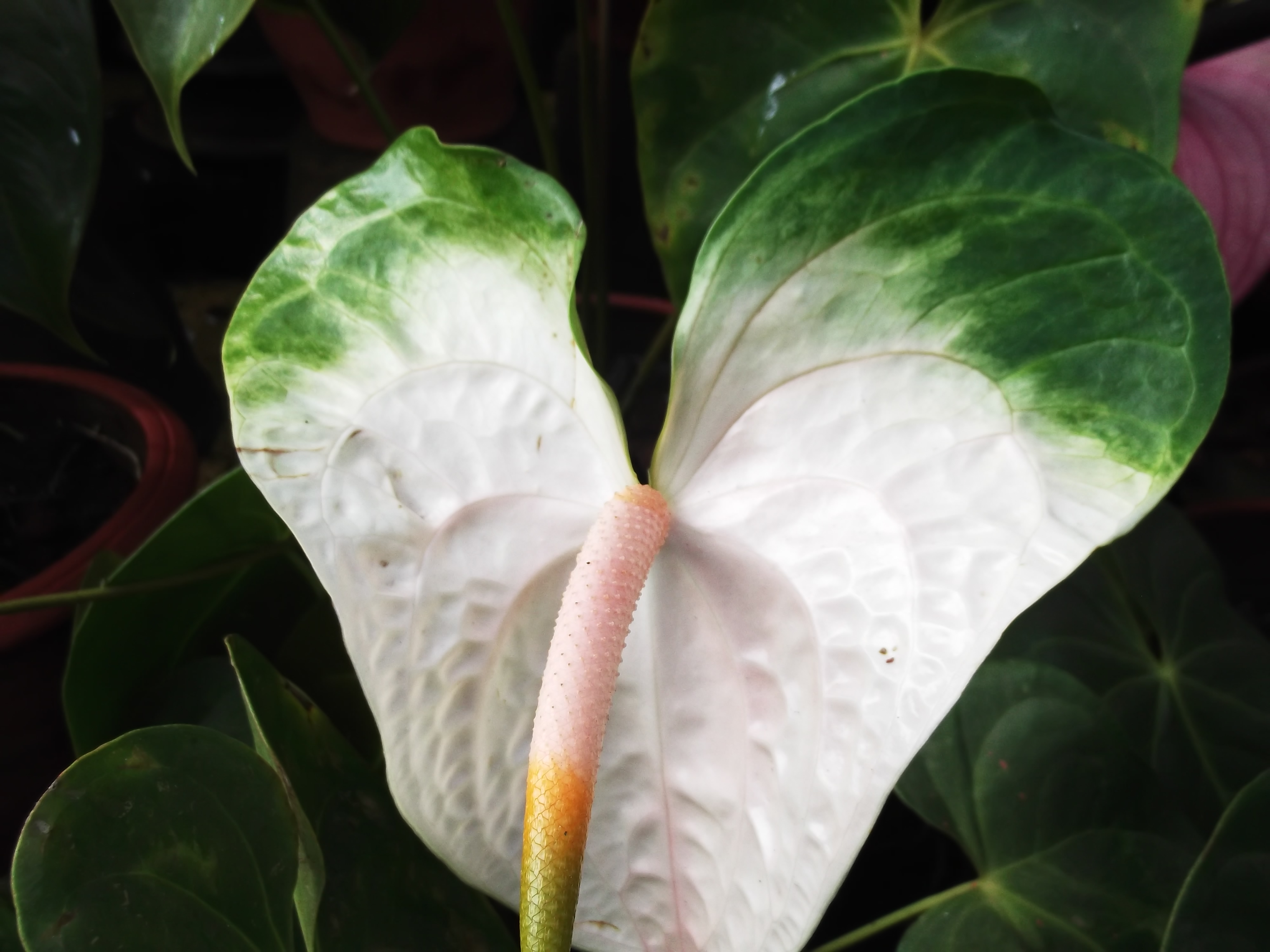

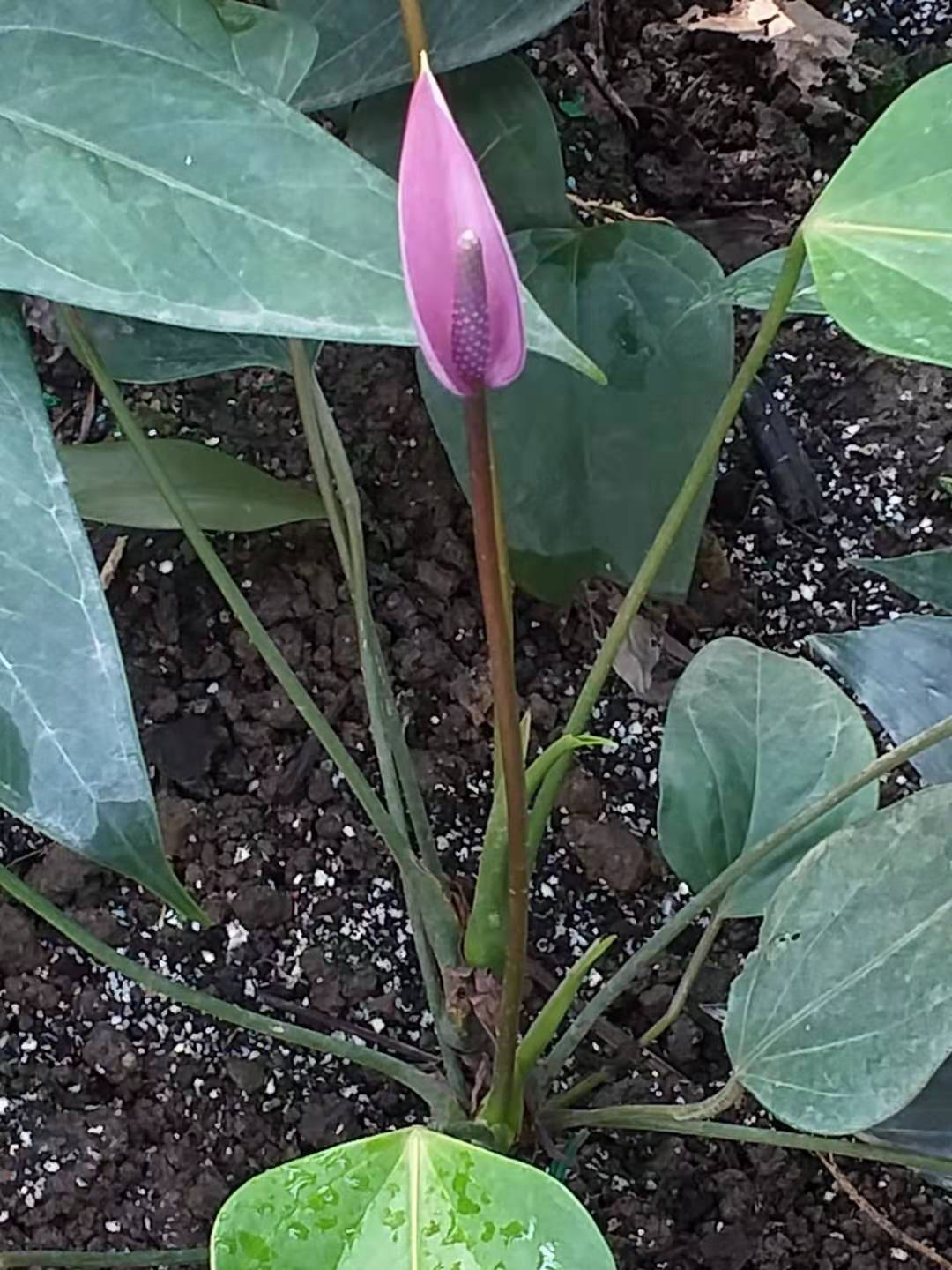
cv. 'Previa'
