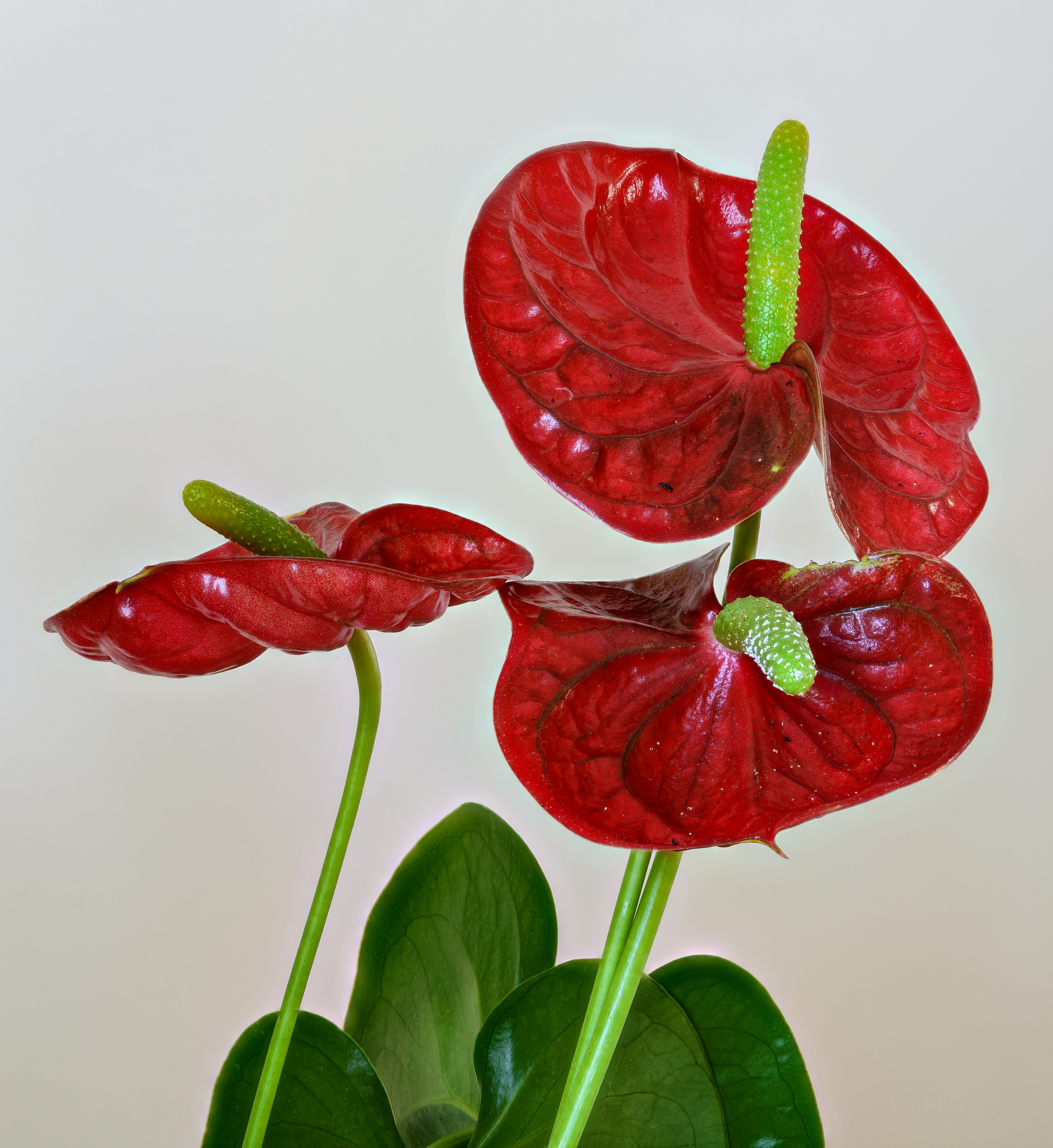
- Anthurium sp.

Scientific classification
- Kingdom: Plantae
- Clade: Tracheophytes
- Clade: Angiosperms
- Clade: Monocots
- Order: Alismatales
- Family: Araceae
- Subfamily: Pothoideae
- Tribe: Anthurieae
- Genus: Anthurium; Schott

Type species
- Anthurium acaule (Jacq.) Schott

Species
- See list of species
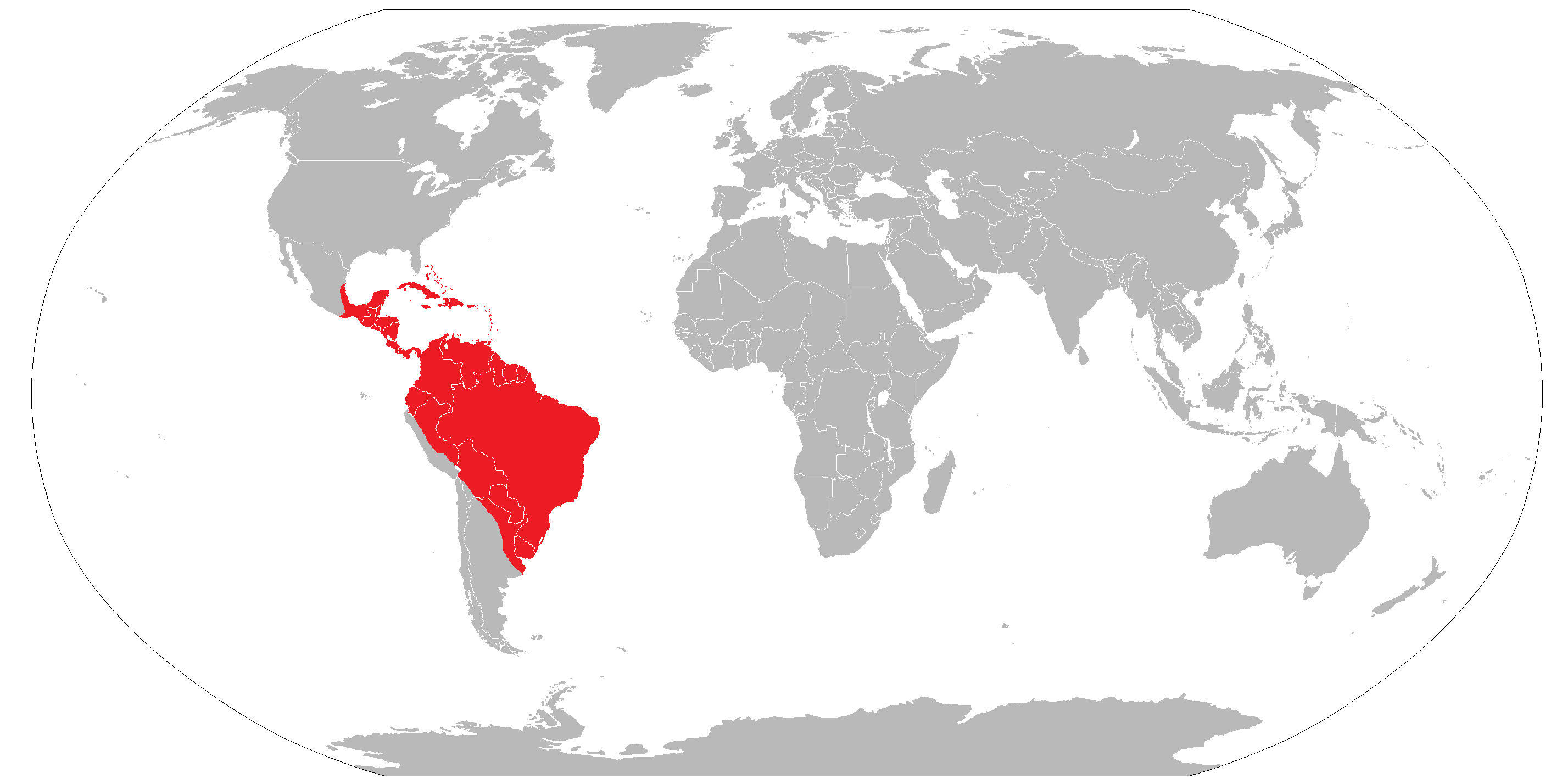
- Range of the genus Anthurium

Synonyms
- Podospadix Raf.; Strepsanthera Raf.

= Anthurium =

Genus of plants

Anthurium (/ænˈθjuːriəm/; Schott, 1829) is a genus of about 1,000 species of flowering plants, the largest genus of the arum family, Araceae. General common names include anthurium, tailflower, flamingo flower, pigtail plant, and laceleaf.

The genus is native to the Americas, where it is distributed from northern Mexico to northern Argentina and parts of the Caribbean.

== Description and biology ==
Anthurium is a genus of herbs often growing as epiphytes on other plants. Some are terrestrial. The leaves are often clustered and are variable in shape. The inflorescence bears small flowers which are perfect, containing male and female structures. The flowers are contained in close together spirals on the spadix. The spadix is often elongated into a spike shape, but it can be globe-shaped or club-shaped. Beneath the spadix is the spathe, a type of bract. This is variable in shape, as well, but it is lance-shaped in many species. It may extend out flat or in a curve. Sometimes it covers the spadix like a hood. The fruits develop from the flowers on the spadix. They are juicy berries varying in color, usually containing two seeds.

The spadix and spathe are a main focus of Anthurium breeders, who develop cultivars in bright colors and unique shapes. Anthurium scherzerianum and A. andraeanum, two of the most common taxa in cultivation, are the only species that grow bright red spathes. They have also been bred to produce spathes in many other colors and patterns.

Anthurium plants are toxic due to calcium oxalate crystals. The sap is irritating to the skin and eyes.

== Cultivation ==
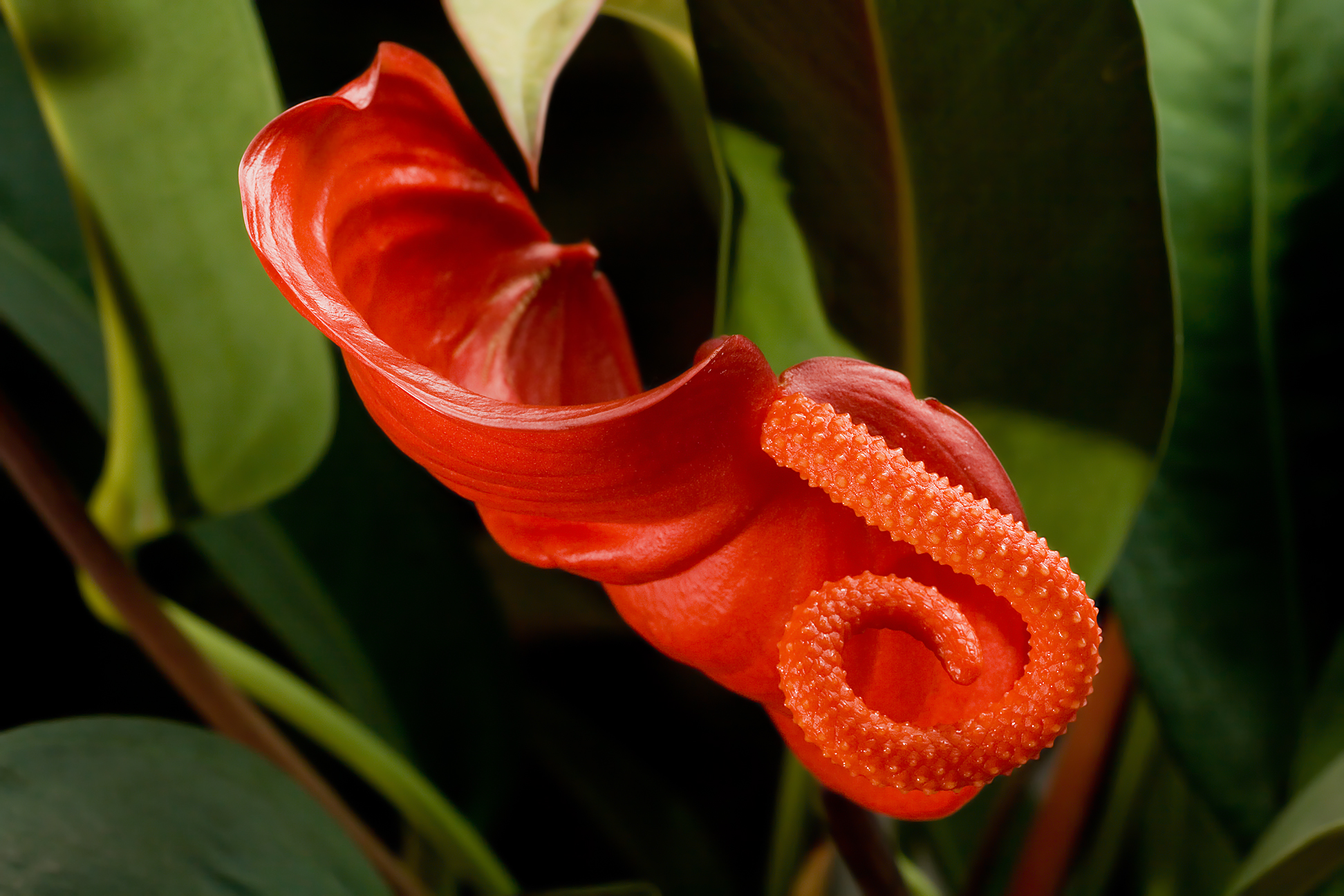
Anthurium scherzerianum inflorescence

Like other aroids, many species of Anthurium plant can be grown as houseplants, or outdoors in mild climates in shady spots, including Anthurium crystallinum and Anthurium clarinervium with its large, velvety, dark green leaves and silvery white venation. Many hybrids are derived from Anthurium andraeanum or Anthurium scherzerianum because of their colorful spathes. They thrive in moist soils with high organic matter. In milder climates the plants can be grown in pots of soil. Indoors plants thrive at temperatures of 16–22 °C (61–72 °F) and at lower light than other house plants. Wiping the leaves off with water will remove any dust and insects. Plants in pots with good root systems will benefit from a weak fertilizer solution every other week. In the case of vining or climbing Anthuriums, the plants benefit from being provided with a totem to climb.

=== Propagation ===
Anthurium can be propagated by seed or vegetatively by cuttings. In the commercial Anthurium trade, most propagation is via tissue culture.

== Species ==
For a full list, see the List of Anthurium species.

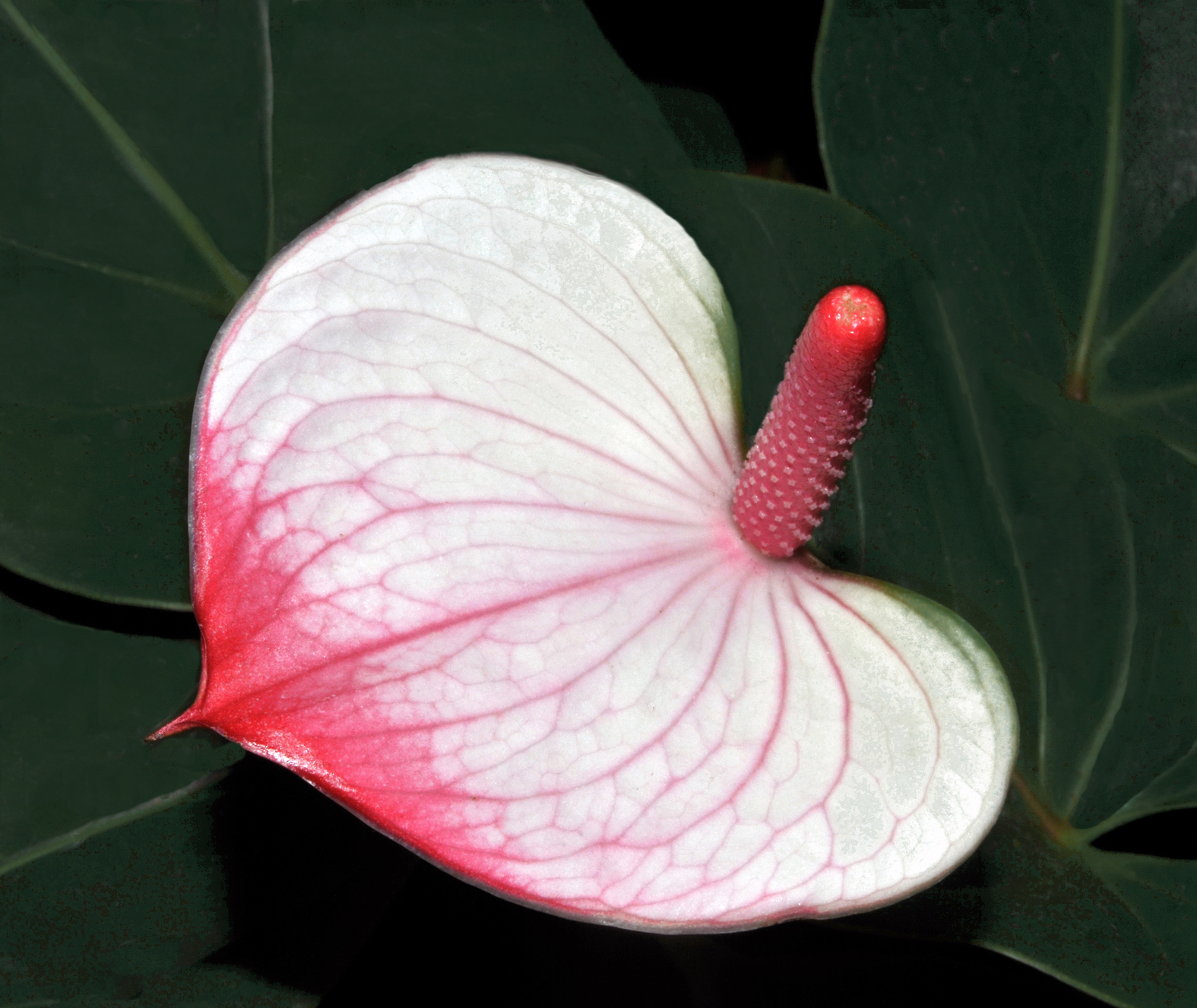
Anthurium andraeanum Princess Amalia Elegance

In 1860 there were 183 species known to science, and Heinrich Wilhelm Schott defined them in 28 sections in the book Prodromus Systematis Aroidearum. In 1905 the genus was revised with a description of 18 sections. In 1983 the genus was divided into the following sections:

- Belolonchium
- Calomystrium
- Cardiolonchium
- Chamaerepium
- Cordatopunctatum
- Dactylophyllium
- Decurrentia
- Digitinervium
- Gymnopodium
- Leptanthurium
- Pachyneurium
- Polyphyllium
- Polyneurium
- Porphyrochitonium
- Schizoplacium
- Semaeophyllium
- Tetraspermium
- Urospadix
- Xialophyllium

== Gallery ==
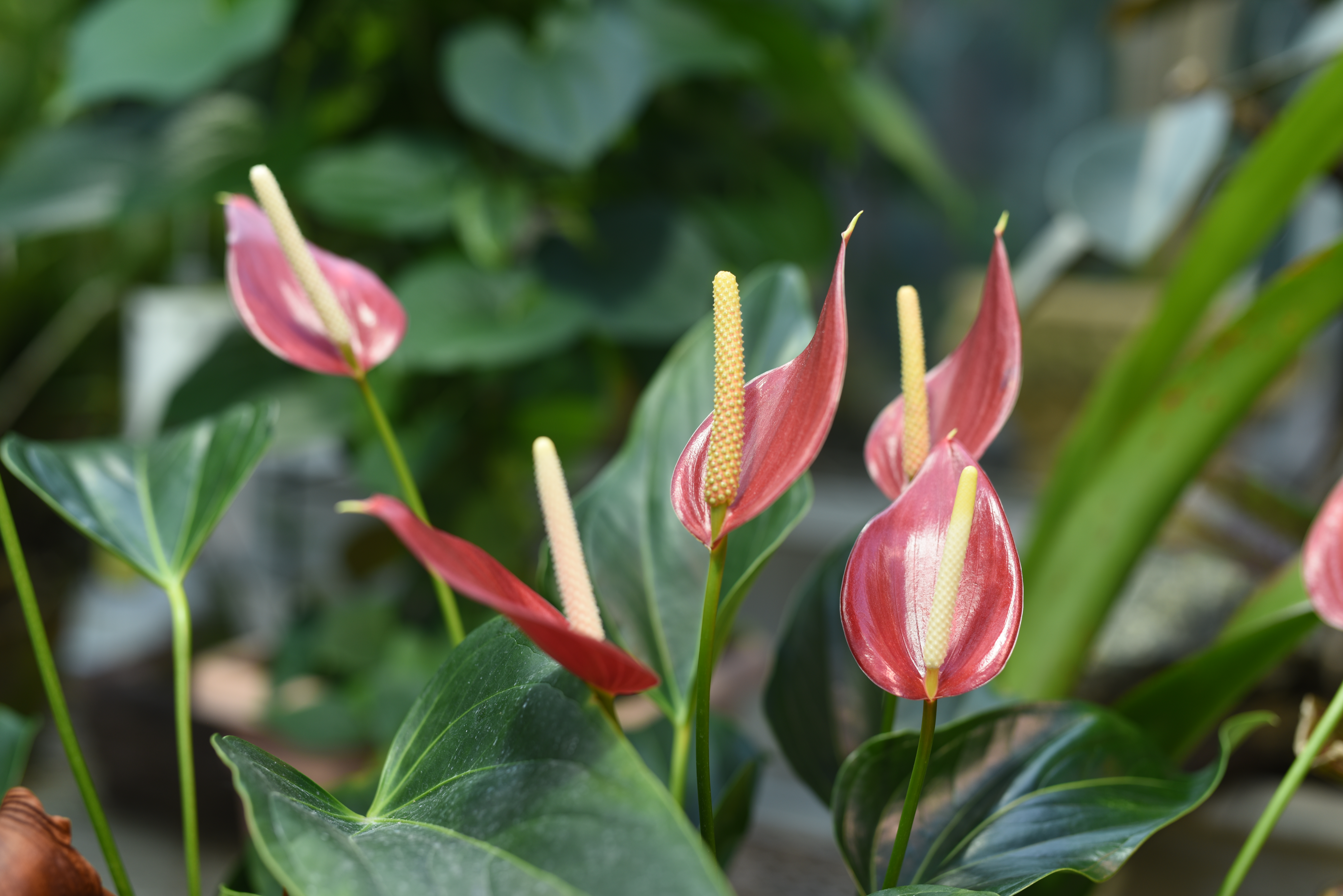
Flamingo Flower

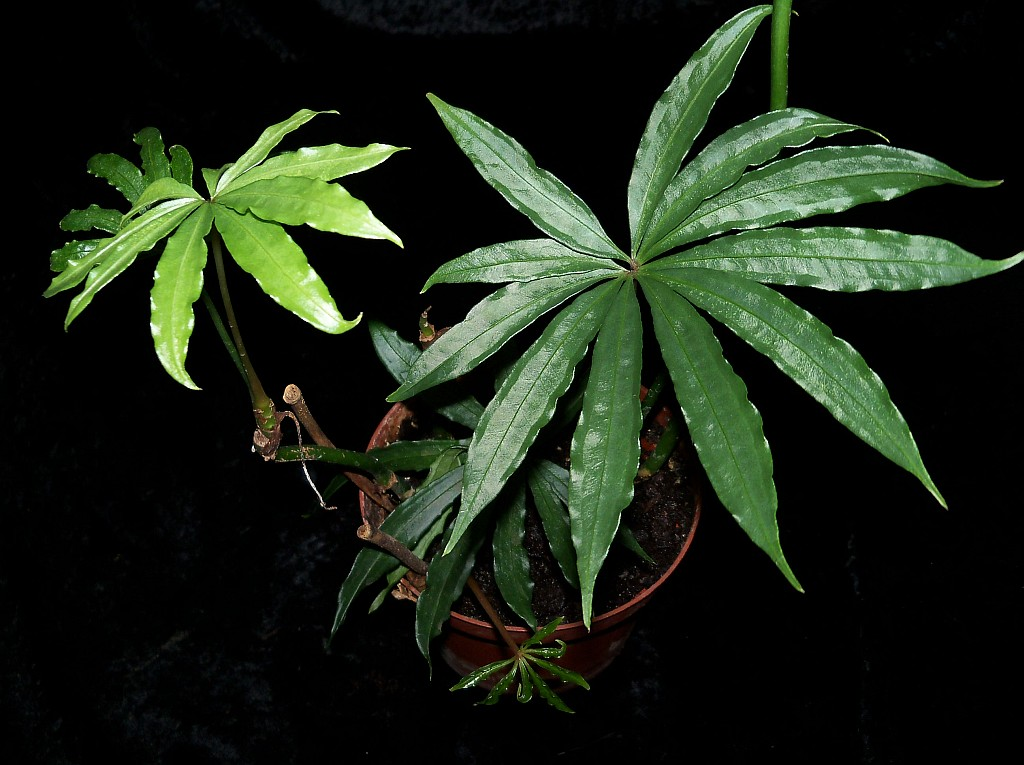
Anthurium polyschistum

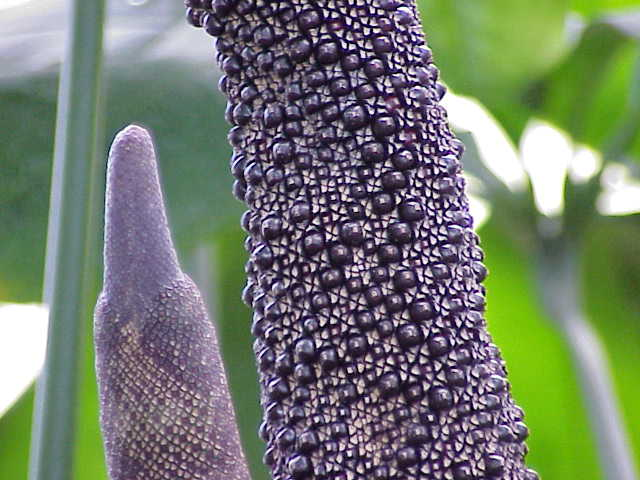
Anthurium digitatum inflorescence

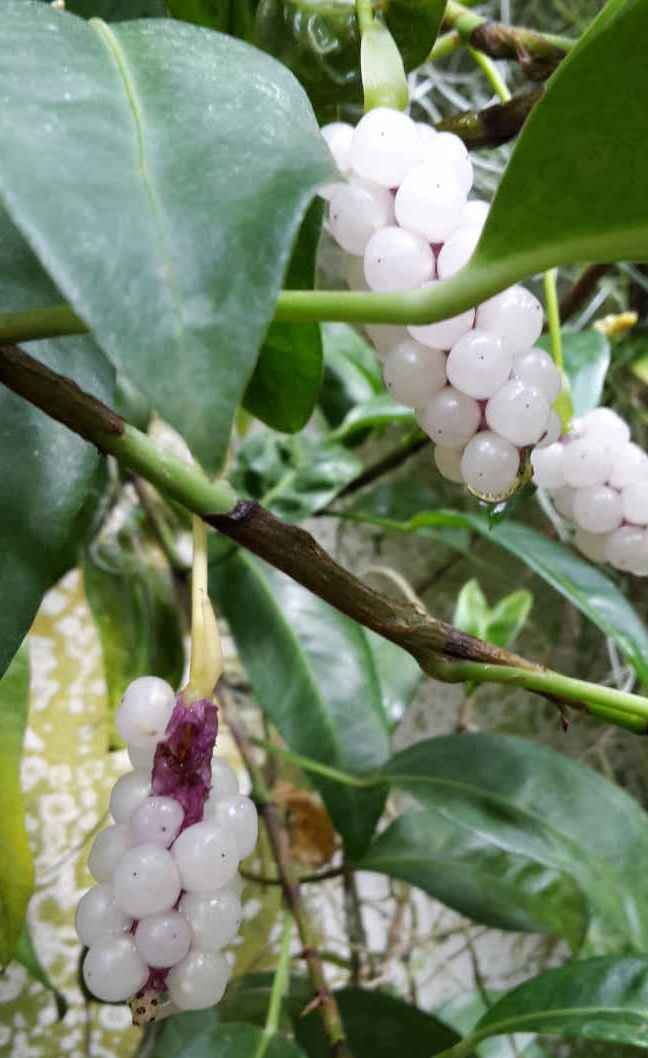
Anthurium scandens fruits and leaves

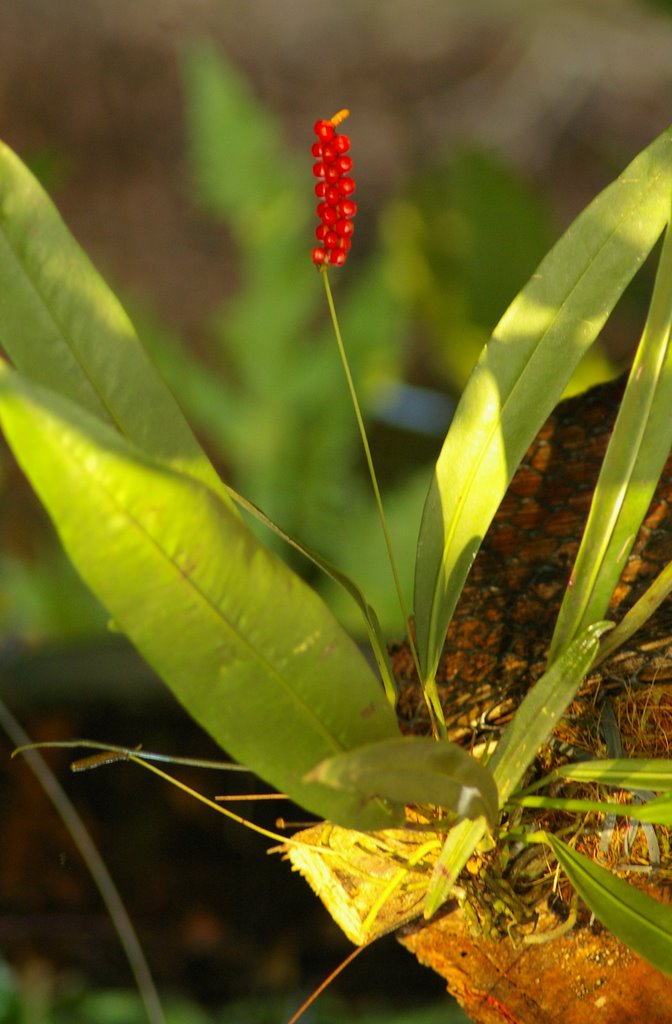
Anthurium gracile

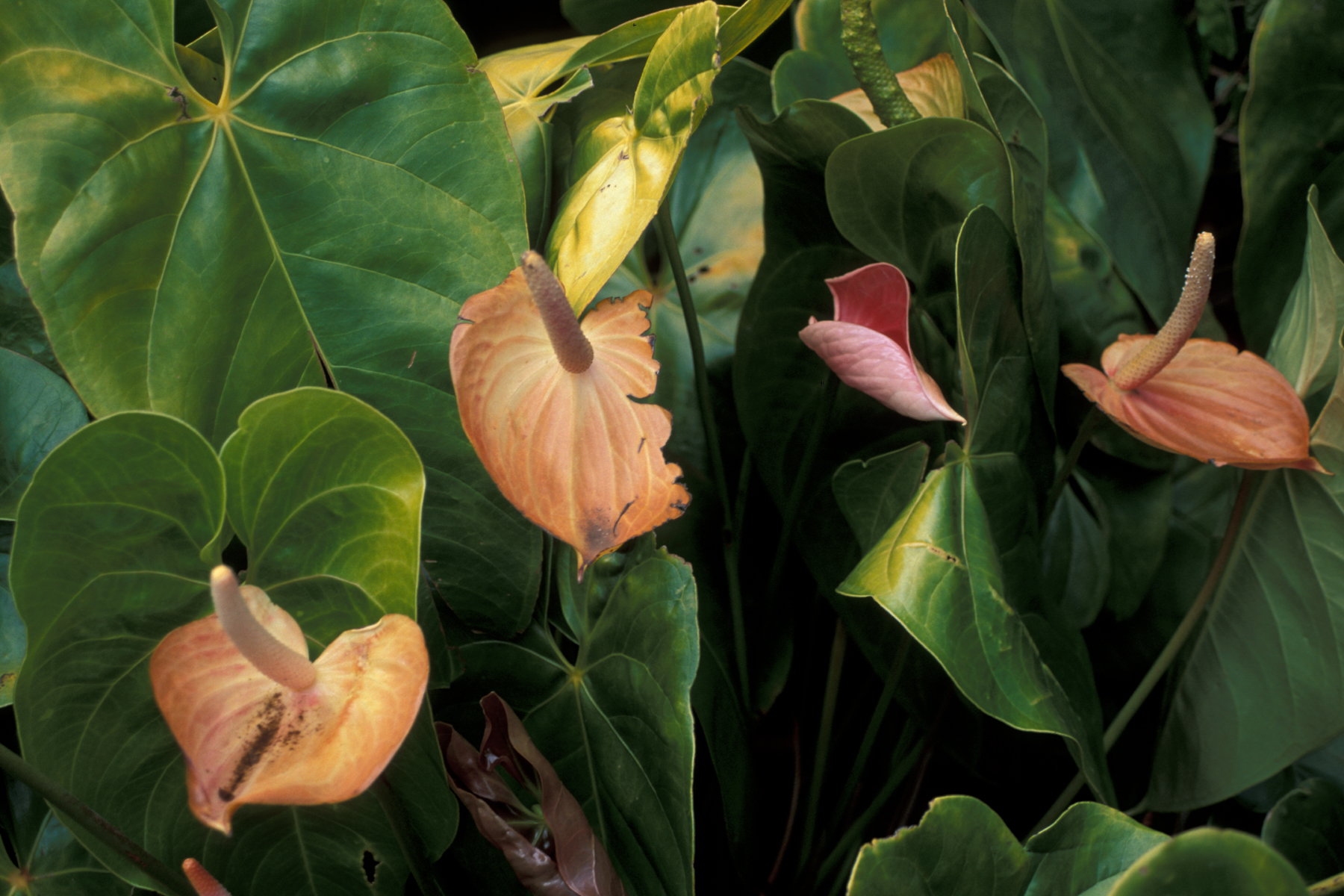
Anthurium andraeanum

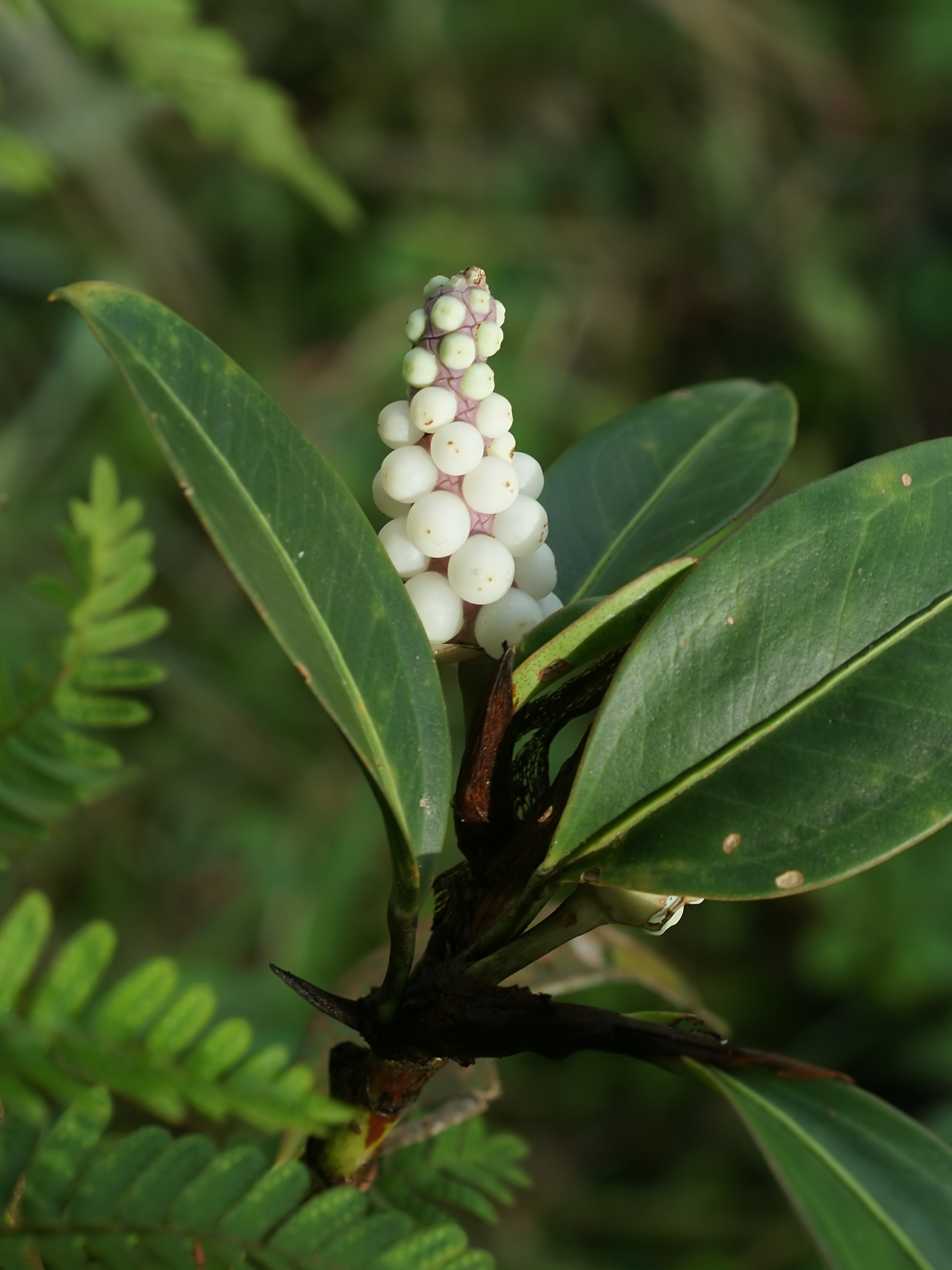
Anthurium obtusum

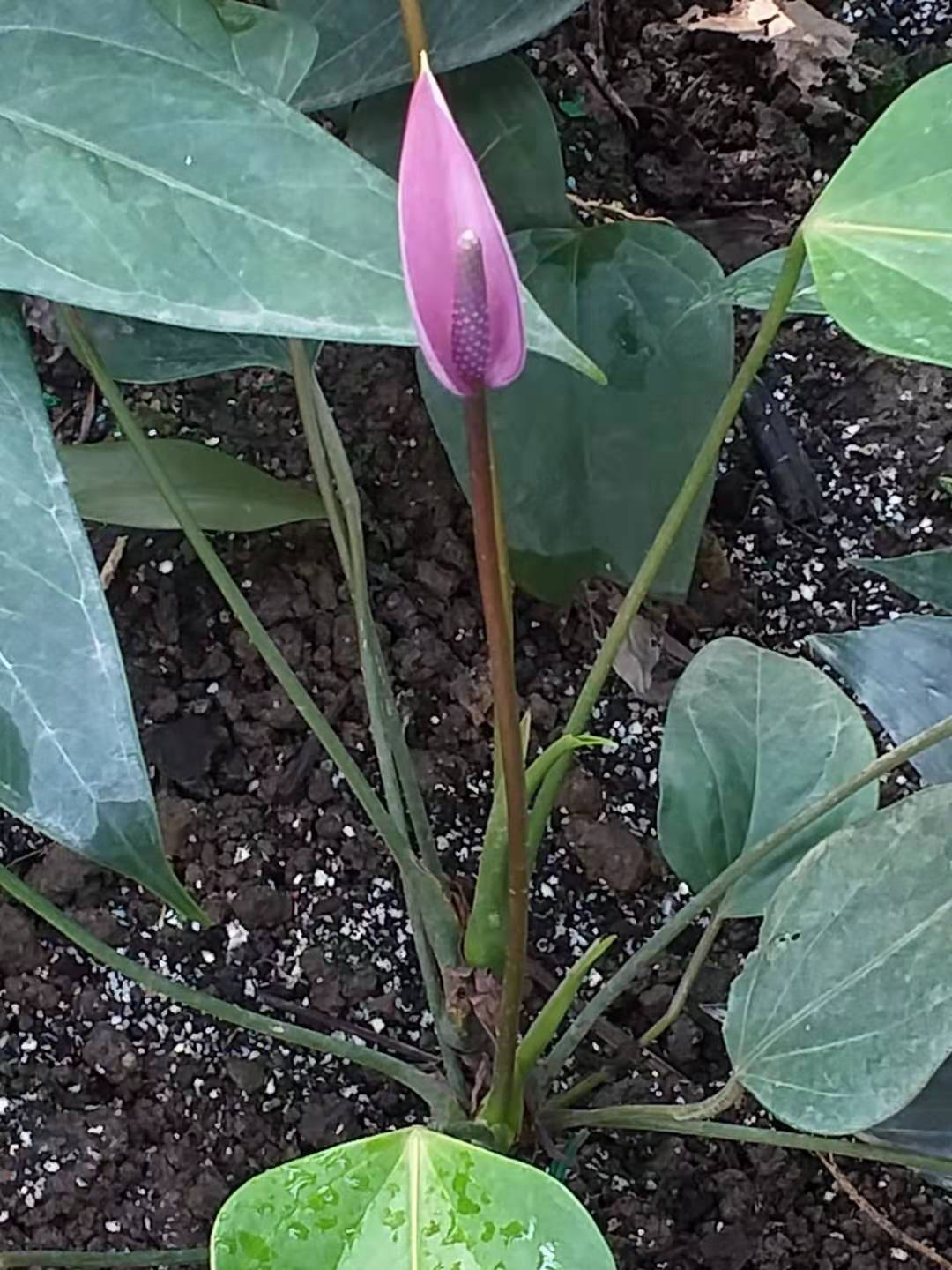
Anthurium andraeanum cv. Previa

== Toxicity ==
- All plants within the Anthurium genus are toxic to cats, dogs, and even horses. Each part of the plant, including the root, stems, leaves, flowers, and seeds, poses a risk of toxicity. The plant contains insoluble calcium oxalate crystals, which can cause oral irritation, pain, swelling, excessive drooling, vomiting, and difficulty swallowing. Keeping these plants away from your pets (and equines) is the best way to prevent a medical emergency.

== See also ==
- Spathiphyllum, similar looking plant genus of same family
