= Pseudohydrosme buettneri =

Scientific classification
- Kingdom: Plantae
- Clade: Tracheophytes
- Clade: Angiosperms
- Clade: Monocots
- Order: Alismatales
- Family: Araceae
- Genus: Pseudohydrosme
- Species: P. buettneri

Binomial name
- Pseudohydrosme buettneri Engl.

Synonyms
- Zyganthera buettneri (Engl.) N.E.Br.

Species of flowering plant

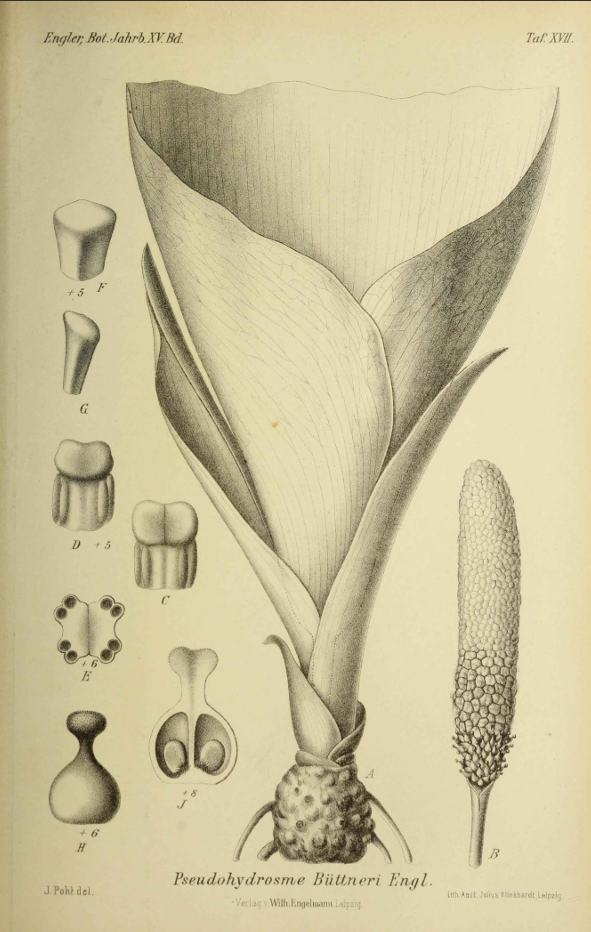
Pseudohydrosme buettneri botanical illustration by Adolf Engler in 1892.

Pseudohydrosme buettneri, commonly known as Büttner's false hydrosme, is a species of flowering plant in the family Araceae. It was described by Adolf Engler in 1892.

== Taxonomy ==
Pseudohydrosme buettneri was first described in 1892 by Adolf Engler based on specimens collected in Gabon. It belongs to the genus Pseudohydrosme in the family Araceae.

Pseudohydrosme buettneri is closely related to Pseudohydrosme gabunensis and Pseudohydrosme bogneri. It has been long confused for the related genus Anchomanes due to their very similar flowers and leaves. However, Pseudohydrosme buettneri can be easily distinguished from Anchomanes by observing their ovaries and fruit habits, as Pseudohydrosme buettneri has a 2-3-locular ovary and stipitate fruits where as the ovary of Anchomanes is unilocular and its fruits are sessile.

== Description ==
Pseudohydrosme buettneri is a spathe flower and on average reaches about 2.5 cm (0.98 inches) long, and 2.5 cm (0.98 inches) wide, with fleshy roots, and semi-long flowers. Peduncle reaches 3 cm (1.18 inches) long, and spathe reaches around 80 cm (31.49 inches) long. Female flowers are solitary and attached near the base of the septums, 4mm long with a 1mm long style. The plant's male flowers have stamens 2mm long and wide, with 2 stamens of the flower. Flowers are around 2 mm (0.07 inches) and 2 mm (0.07 inches) wide with the coloration unknown. It generally flowers in September. Leaf morphology is unknown or not described due to limited material.

Its holotype was collected in 1884 at Sibange-Farm, Libreville, and is now believed to be lost.

== Distribution and habitat ==
Pseudohydrosme buettneri is endemic to the Sibange-Farm, Libreville, Gabon, where the only specimen known of the species perished over a century ago. Its habitat is made up of lowland-evergreen forests dominated by Aucoumea klaineana.

== Ecology ==
Very little is known about the ecology of Pseudohydrosme buettneri due to the fact that a living specimen has not been observed in over a century, but based on related species in the Pseudohydrosme genus, the species likely grows in shaded lowland tropical forests in Gabon. The species has a spadix and spathe inflorescence and is also likely to utilize scent and thermogenic mechanisms to attract flies and beetles as most species in the Araceae family are insect-pollinated.

== Conservation and classification ==
Pseudohydrosme buettneri is listed as "Critically Endangered" by most sources, although the IUCN Red List hasn't officially assigned a conservation status to the most likely extinct species yet, for there are no known individuals left in its native range. Locals believe the species is still alive, but no solid evidence of its survival has been uncovered since its discovery. There are currently no known conservation or restoration efforts employed to try to find Pseudohydrosme buettneri specifically or restore its habitats.

Pseudohydrosme buettneri's common name should be "Büttner's false hydrosme", but was misspelled in the Latin name as "buettneri" (Buettner's).
