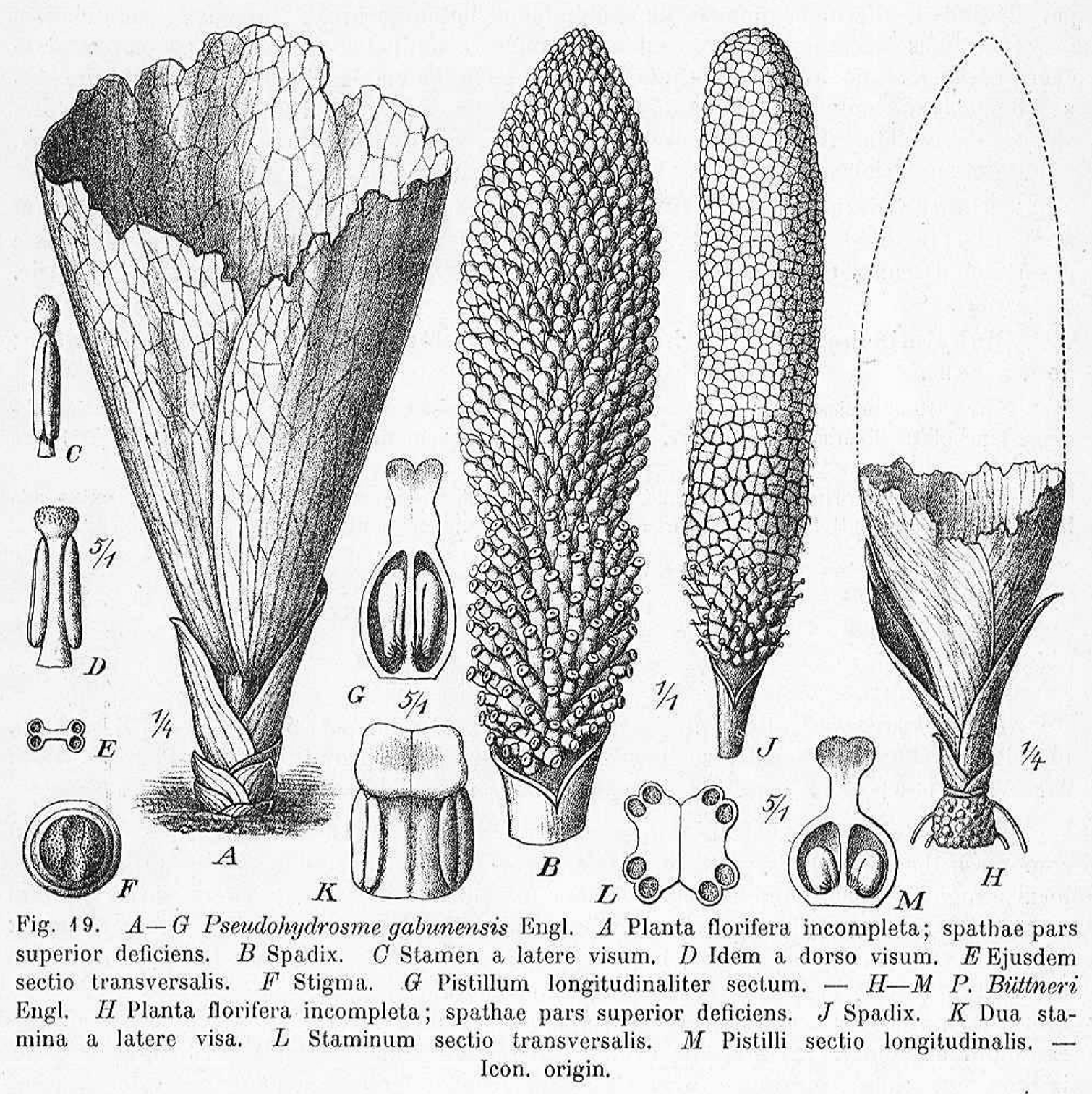
- Pseudohydrosme gabunensis

Scientific classification
- Kingdom: Plantae
- Clade: Embryophytes
- Clade: Tracheophytes
- Clade: Spermatophytes
- Clade: Angiosperms
- Clade: Monocots
- Order: Alismatales
- Family: Araceae
- Subfamily: Aroideae
- Tribe: Nephthytideae
- Genus: Pseudohydrosme; Engl.

Synonyms
- Zyganthera N.E.Br.

= Pseudohydrosme =

Genus of flowering plants

Pseudohydrosme is a genus of flowering plants in the family Araceae. It contains only three species, Pseudohydrosme buettneri, Pseudohydrosme gabunensis, and more recently Pseudohydrosme ebo, two being endemic to tropical rain forests in Gabon, and the other being native to the Ebo Forest of Cameroon. The genus is believed to be closely related to Anchomanes and is likely to be sunk into Anchomanes due to molecular evidence.
