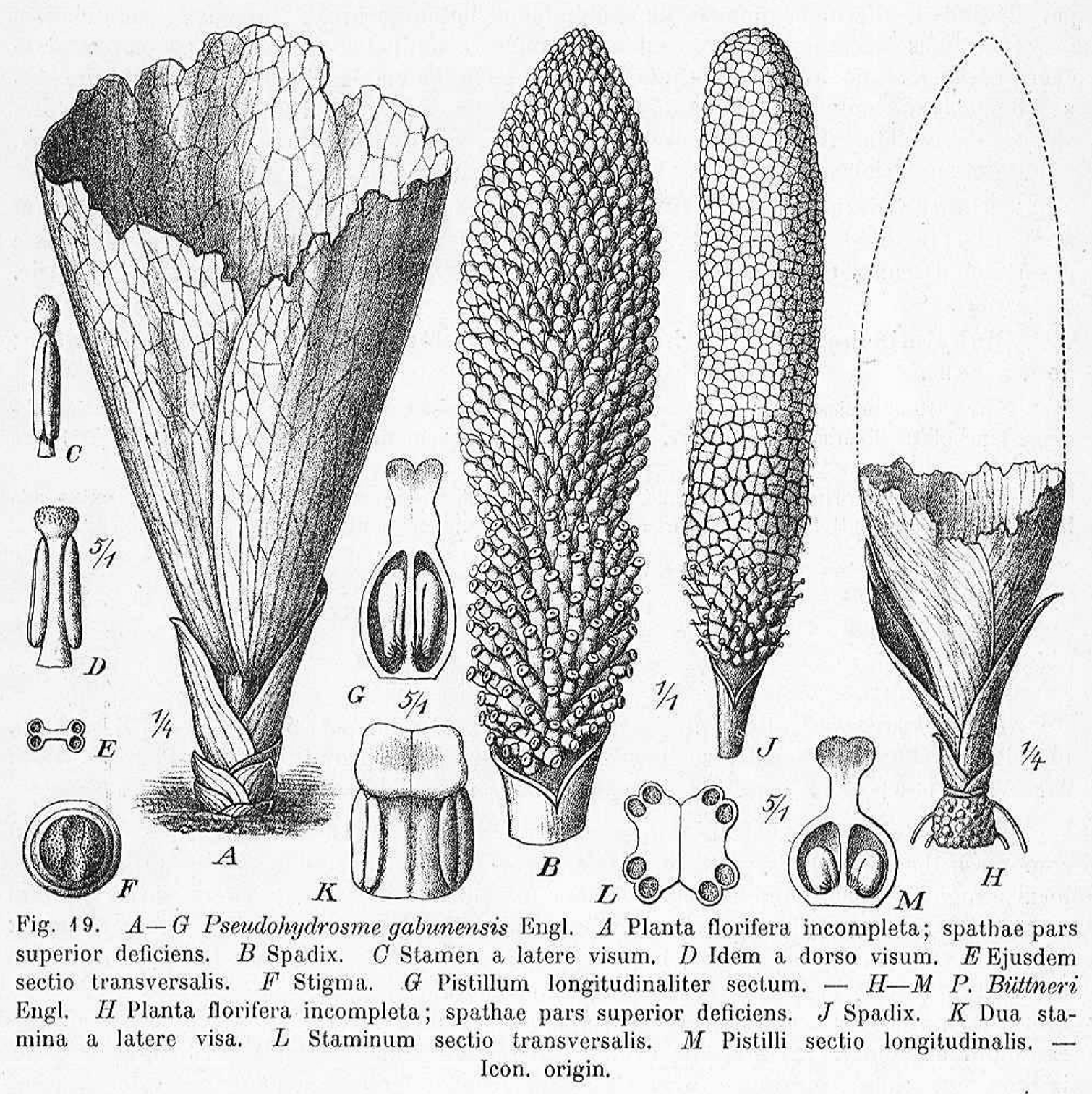

Conservation status
- Endangered (IUCN 3.1)

Scientific classification
- Kingdom: Plantae
- Clade: Tracheophytes
- Clade: Angiosperms
- Clade: Monocots
- Order: Alismatales
- Family: Araceae
- Subfamily: Aroideae
- Tribe: Nephthytideae
- Genus: Pseudohydrosme
- Species: P. gabunensis

Binomial name
- Pseudohydrosme gabunensis Engl.

= Pseudohydrosme gabunensis =

Species of flowering plant

Pseudohydrosme gabunensis, commonly known as the Gabon false hydrosme, is a species of flowering plant in the family Araceae. It was described by Heinrich Gustav Adolf Engler in 1892.

== Description ==
Pseudohydrosme gabunensis on average reaches about 15 cm (5.9 in) tall, and 9–12 cm (3.5–4.7 in) in diameter. Leaves are 1–1.3 m (39–51 in) long, and 1–1.4 m (3.3–4.6 ft) in diameter. Spathe is 30–55 cm (12–21.5 in) long. Flowers are white on the outside, to a purple-black color in the inside. Seeds are 9 mm (0.35 in) long, and 7 mm (0.28 in) wide.

== Distribution and habitat ==
Pseudohydrosme gabunensis is endemic to the surrounding areas, and within Libreville, Gabon, where it grows in lowland tropical rainforests. Specimens are only known from five recorded sites, four being within Libreville, and the other being in the Komo Department, Gabon.

== Classification and conservation ==
Pseudohydrosme gabunensis is spelt in its Latin name as "gabunensis" or "Gabun", which is the German spelling of Gabon.

Pseudohydrosme gabunensis is currently listed as "Endangered" by the IUCN Red List, for deforestation and poaching are affecting the species limited natural range greatly. The species has gone extinct in some of its native range, for human urbanization and development are also becoming a severe threat in Libreville and some other surrounding suburban areas.

== Uses ==
Pseudohydrosme gabunensis is being over-exploited as an ornamental plant, from which collectors are trying to make a profit on the illegal plant trade, or keeping the specimens for themselves, being very similar to Pseudohydrosme ebo.
