= Hapaline =

Hapaline can refer to the following:

- Any of the New World monkeys of the family Callitrichidae, which was incorrectly renamed Hapalinae for a time.
- Any of the aroid plants of the genus Hapaline.
