= Carlephyton diegonse =

Conservation status
- Vulnerable (IUCN 3.1)

Scientific classification
- Kingdom: Plantae
- Clade: Tracheophytes
- Clade: Angiosperms
- Clade: Monocots
- Order: Alismatales
- Family: Araceae
- Genus: Carlephyton
- Species: C. diegonse

Binomial name
- Carlephyton diegonse Bogner

Species of flowering plant

Carlephyton diegonse is a species in the genus Carlephyton endemic to Madagascar. It was described by Josef Bogner in 1972.

== Description ==
Carlephyton diegonse is herbaceous. It is different from the other two species in the genus due to its directly superimposed male and female cones on the spadix and because there are no bisexual flowers and the top of the spadix consists of only sterile male flowers. The lead is pale green and shortly decurrent on the petiole. It likes a pH of 5.4-5.8 and can be found growing with Colletogyne perrieri and C. diegoense.

== Range and habitat ==
Carlephyton diegonse is known from a single population at Montagne des Français in northern Madagascar. It grows in shrublands in the dry deciduous forests, between sea level and 500 meters elevation.

Although its range is within the Montagne des Français protected area, the species is threatened with habitat loss from deforestation caused by livestock grazing and subsistence wood harvesting.
