= Ulearum donburnsii =

Scientific classification
- Kingdom: Plantae
- Clade: Tracheophytes
- Clade: Angiosperms
- Clade: Monocots
- Order: Alismatales
- Family: Araceae
- Genus: Ulearum
- Species: U. donburnsii

Binomial name
- Ulearum donburnsii Croat & Feuerst.

Species of plant

Ulearum donburnsii is a species of plant in the family Araceae. Native to the Amazonian lowlands of Ecuador, it can be distinguished from its relative Ulearum sagittatum by the finer, thread-like staminodes on its spadix. It has arrowhead-shaped leaves and grows terrestrially from small rhizomes. The species was described in 2003 and named for Don Burns, a noted grower of aroids and a member of the International Aroid Society.
