= C. madagascariense =

C. madagascariense may refer to:

- Carlephyton madagascariense, a plant species
- Cephalostachyum madagascariense, a synonym for Cathariostachys madagascariensis, the Madagascar giant bamboo or Volohosy in Malagasy language, a bamboo species found in Madagascar
