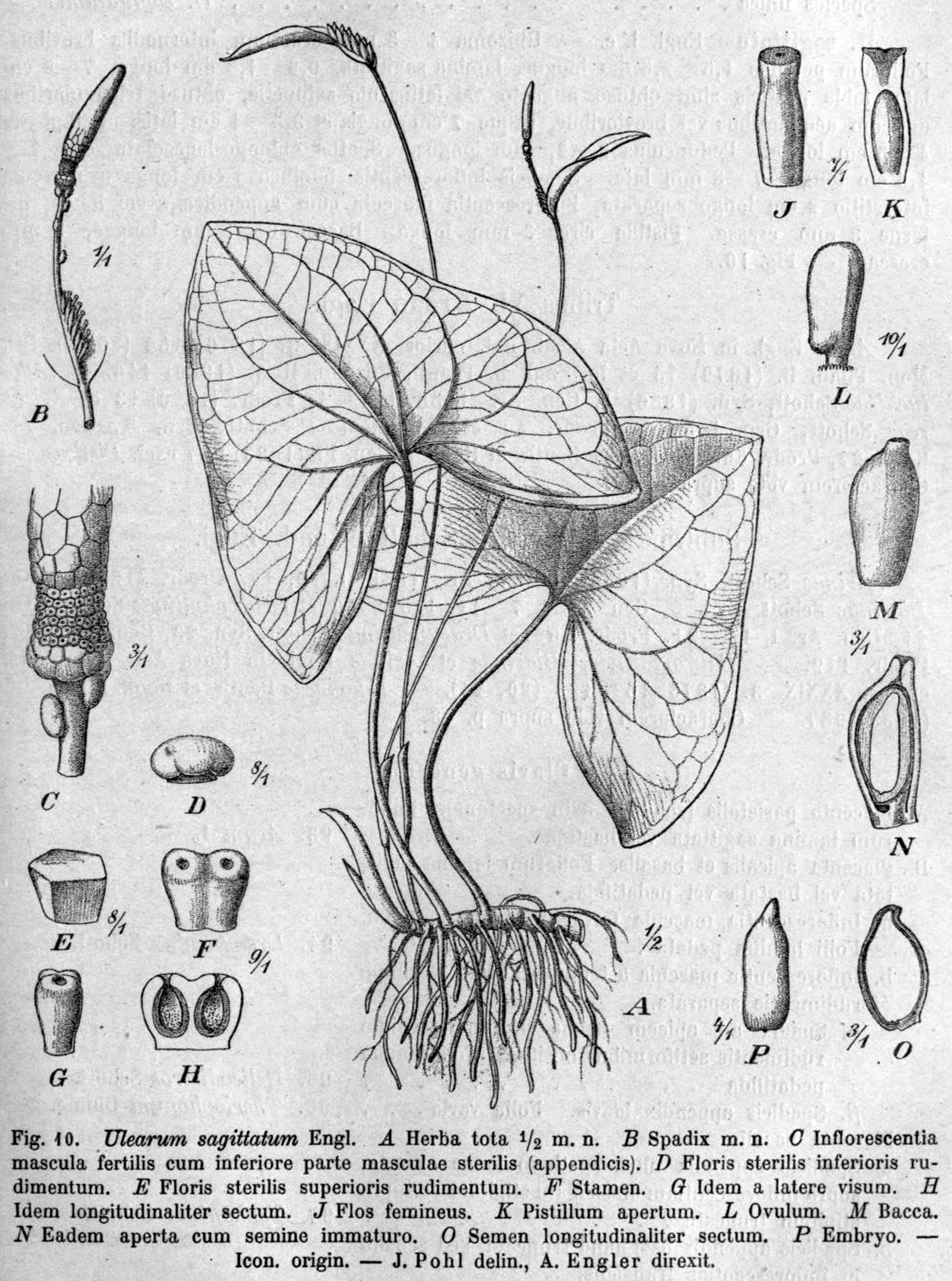
- Ulearum sagittatum

Scientific classification
- Kingdom: Plantae
- Clade: Embryophytes
- Clade: Tracheophytes
- Clade: Spermatophytes
- Clade: Angiosperms
- Clade: Monocots
- Order: Alismatales
- Family: Araceae
- Subfamily: Aroideae
- Tribe: Caladieae
- Genus: Ulearum; Engl.

= Ulearum =

Genus of flowering plants

Ulearum is a genus of flowering plants in the family Araceae. It contains two known species, both native to South America. Ulearum is similar to Callopsis, but Callopsis is found only in Africa and so its relation is uncertain.

- Ulearum donburnsii Croat & Feuerst. 2003 - Ecuador
- Ulearum sagittatum Engl. 1905 - Loreto region of eastern Peru, Acre State in western Brazil

formerly included

- Ulearum reconditum Madison 1980 = Bognera recondita (Madison) Mayo & Nicolson 1984 - Amazonas State in western Brazil
