= Bognera =

Scientific classification
- Kingdom: Plantae
- Clade: Tracheophytes
- Clade: Angiosperms
- Clade: Monocots
- Order: Alismatales
- Family: Araceae
- Subfamily: Aroideae
- Tribe: Dieffenbachieae
- Genus: Bognera; S.Mayo & D.Nicolson
- Species: B. recondita

Binomial name
- Bognera recondita (Madison) S.Mayo & Nicolson

Genus of flowering plants

Bognera is a monotypic genus of flowering plants in the family Araceae. The single species that makes up the genus is Bognera recondita. The word recondita means "hidden" referring to the fact that the plant is only found in remote areas of Amazonian Brazil near the Peruvian border. The species was discovered in the late 1970s and was originally placed in the genus Ulearum, as Ulearum reconditum Madison, Aroideana 3: 101 (1980).

In 1984, a new genus was created in Taxon vol.33 on page 690, and Bognera was named after the German Aroid specialist Josef Bogner (b. 1939), who was a botanist, director of the botanical garden in Munich and a specialist in Araceae.

Bognera is believed to be closely related to Dieffenbachia.
