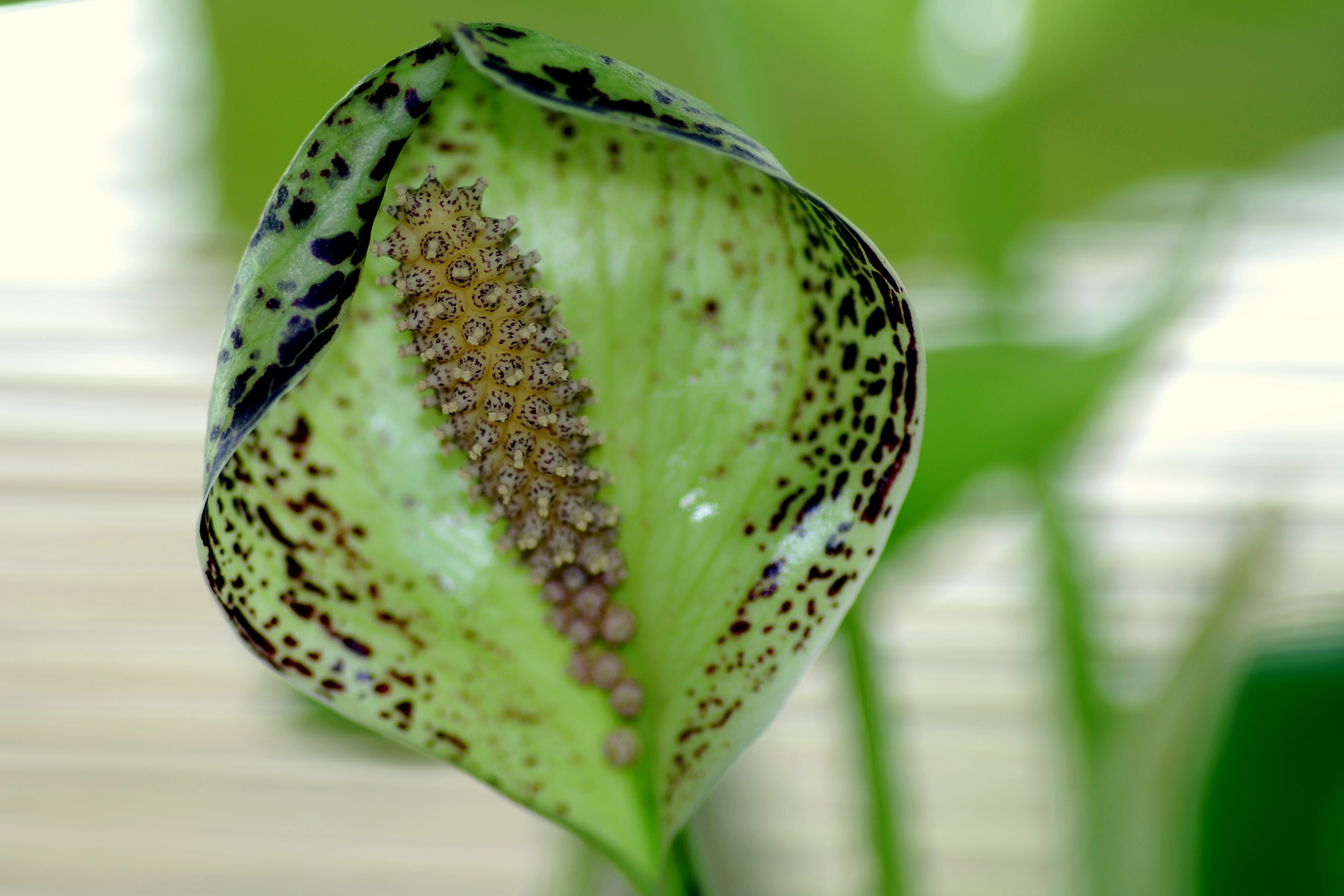

Scientific classification
- Kingdom: Plantae
- Clade: Tracheophytes
- Clade: Angiosperms
- Clade: Monocots
- Order: Alismatales
- Family: Araceae
- Subfamily: Aroideae
- Tribe: Arophyteae

= Arophyteae =

Tribe of flowering plants

Arophyteae is a tribe in the family Araceae. It contains three genera Colletogyne, Carlephyton, and Arophyton. All species in Arophyteae are endemic to Madagascar.
