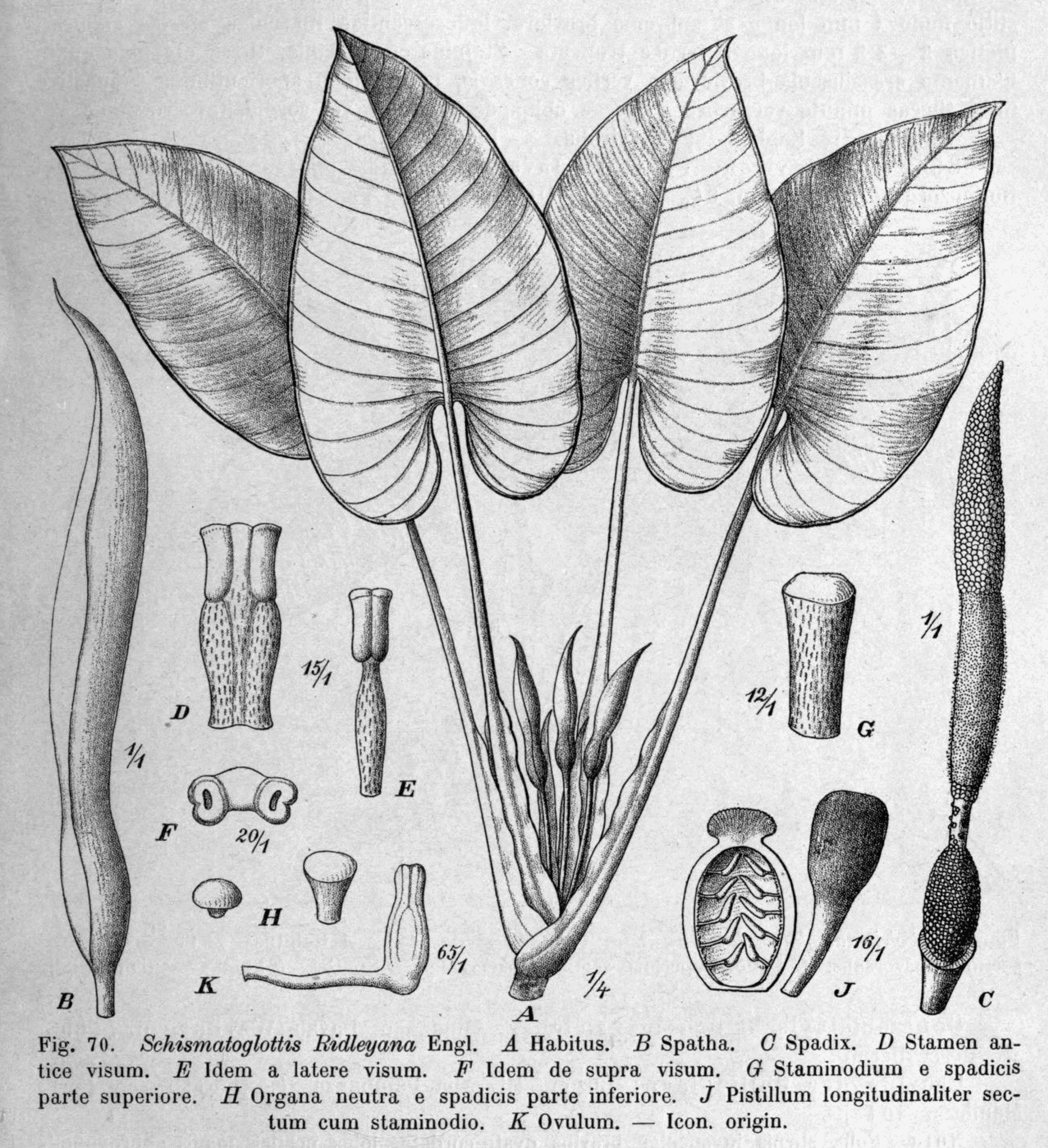
- Apoballis mutata botanical drawing, 1912

Scientific classification
- Kingdom: Plantae
- Clade: Tracheophytes
- Clade: Angiosperms
- Clade: Monocots
- Order: Alismatales
- Family: Araceae
- Subfamily: Aroideae
- Tribe: Schismatoglottideae
- Genus: Apoballis; Schott

= Apoballis =

Genus of flowering plants

Apoballis is a genus of plants in the Araceae. It is native to Southeast Asia, primarily the island of Sumatra in Indonesia, and northwards to Peninsular Malaysia, Thailand, and Myanmar and eastwards to Java and the Lesser Sunda Islands. Some authorities regard this group as part of the larger genus Schismatoglottis.

== Species ==
As of December 2025, Plants of the World Online accepts the following 14 species:

- Apoballis acuminatissima (Schott) S.Y.Wong & P.C.Boyce - Sumatra
- Apoballis belophylla (Alderw.) S.Y.Wong & P.C.Boyce - Sumatra
- Apoballis brevipes (Hook.f.) S.Y.Wong & P.C.Boyce - Sumatra, Thailand, Peninsular Malaysia
- Apoballis grandiflora (Alderw.) S.Y.Wong & P.C.Boyce - Sumatra
- Apoballis hastifolia (Hallier f. ex Engl.) S.Y.Wong & P.C.Boyce - Sumatra
- Apoballis javanica (Engl.) S.Y.Wong & P.C.Boyce - Java
- Apoballis linguiformis (Engl.) S.Y.Wong & P.C.Boyce
- Apoballis longicaulis (Ridl.) S.Y.Wong & P.C.Boyce - Sumatra
- Apoballis mutata (Scort. ex Hook.f.) S.Y.Wong & P.C.Boyce - Myanmar, Sumatra, Thailand, Peninsular Malaysia
- Apoballis okadae (M.Hotta) S.Y.Wong & P.C.Boyce - Sumatra
- Apoballis ovata (Schott) S.Y.Wong & P.C.Boyce - Sumatra
- Apoballis ridleyana (Engl.) S.Y.Wong & P.C.Boyce
- Apoballis rupestris (Zoll. & Moritzi) S.Y.Wong & P.C.Boyce - Sumatra, Java, Bali, Lombok, Timor
- Apoballis sagittifolia (Alderw.) S.Y.Wong & P.C.Boyce - Sumatra
