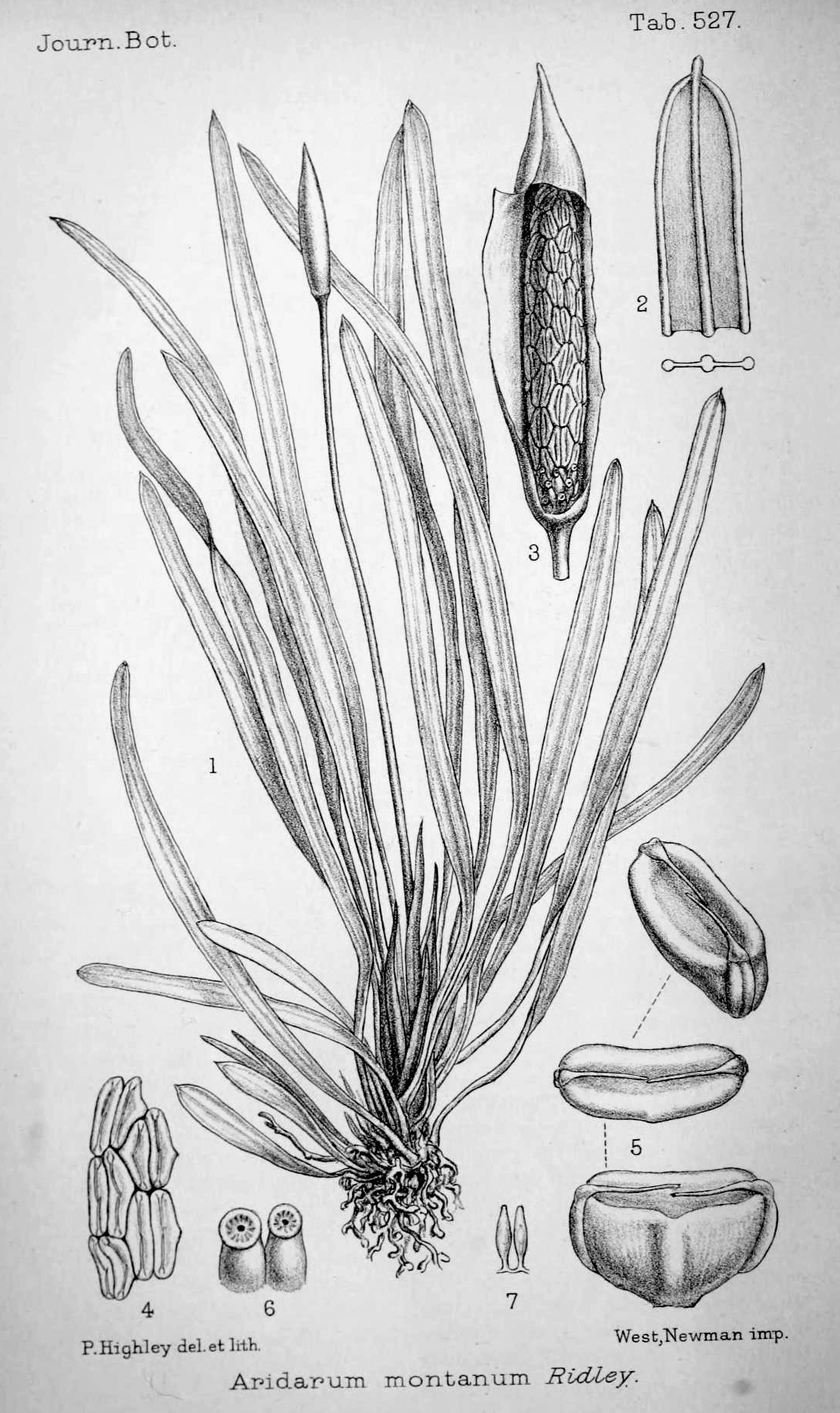
- Aridarum montanum

Scientific classification
- Kingdom: Plantae
- Clade: Tracheophytes
- Clade: Angiosperms
- Clade: Monocots
- Order: Alismatales
- Family: Araceae
- Subfamily: Aroideae
- Tribe: Schismatoglottideae
- Genus: Aridarum; Ridl.

Synonyms
- Heteroaridarum M.Hotta

= Aridarum =

Genus of flowering plants

Aridarum is a genus of flowering plants in the family Araceae. All of the known species in this genus are rheophytic and are endemic to the Island of Borneo. The plant is aquatic and has willow-shaped leaves that are able to take strong currents without sustaining damage.

== Species ==
- Aridarum borneense (M.Hotta) Bogner & A.Hay - Sarawak
- Aridarum burttii Bogner & Nicolson - Sarawak
- Aridarum caulescens M.Hotta - Sarawak, Brunei
- Aridarum crassum S.Y.Wong & P.C.Boyce - Sarawak
- Aridarum incavatum H.Okada & Y.Mori - Borneo
- Aridarum minimum H.Okada - Borneo
- Aridarum montanum Ridl. - Sarawak
- Aridarum nicolsonii Bogner - Sarawak, West Kalimantan
- Aridarum purseglovei (Furtado) M.Hotta - Sarawak
- Aridarum rostratum Bogner & A.Hay - West Kalimantan

=== Formerly placed here ===
- Hera hebe (S.Y.Wong, S.L.Low & P.C.Boyce) S.Y.Wong & P.C.Boyce (as Aridarum hebe S.Y.Wong, S.L.Low & P.C.Boyce)
