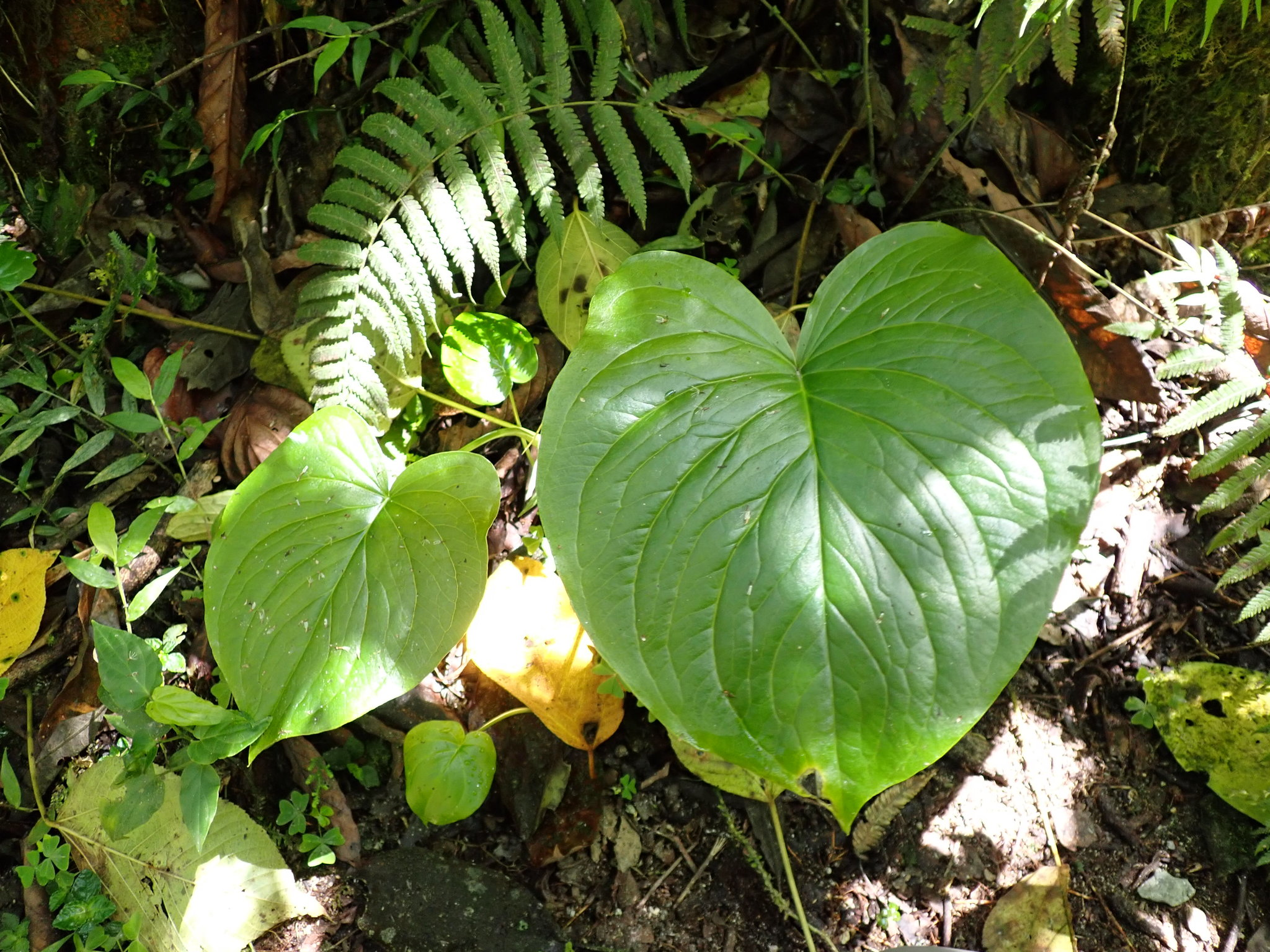
- Spathantheum orbignyanum in Peru

Scientific classification
- Kingdom: Plantae
- Clade: Tracheophytes
- Clade: Angiosperms
- Clade: Monocots
- Order: Alismatales
- Family: Araceae
- Subfamily: Aroideae
- Tribe: Spathicarpeae
- Genus: Spathantheum; Schott

Synonyms
- Gamochlamys Baker

= Spathantheum =

Genus of flowering plants

Spathantheum is a genus of flowering plants in the family Araceae. The genus contains two species, Spathantheum fallax and Spathantheum orbignyanum. Spathantheum is believed to be closely related to Spathicarpa. The genus is endemic to the Andes of Peru, Bolivia, and northern Argentina and is found growing in grasslands in rocky soil.

Species

1. Spathantheum fallax Hett., Ibisch & E.G.Gonç. - Bolivia
2. Spathantheum orbignyanum Schott - Peru, northwestern Argentina, Bolivia

formerly included

- Spathantheum intermedium Bogner = Gorgonidium intermedium (Bogner) E.G.Gonç
