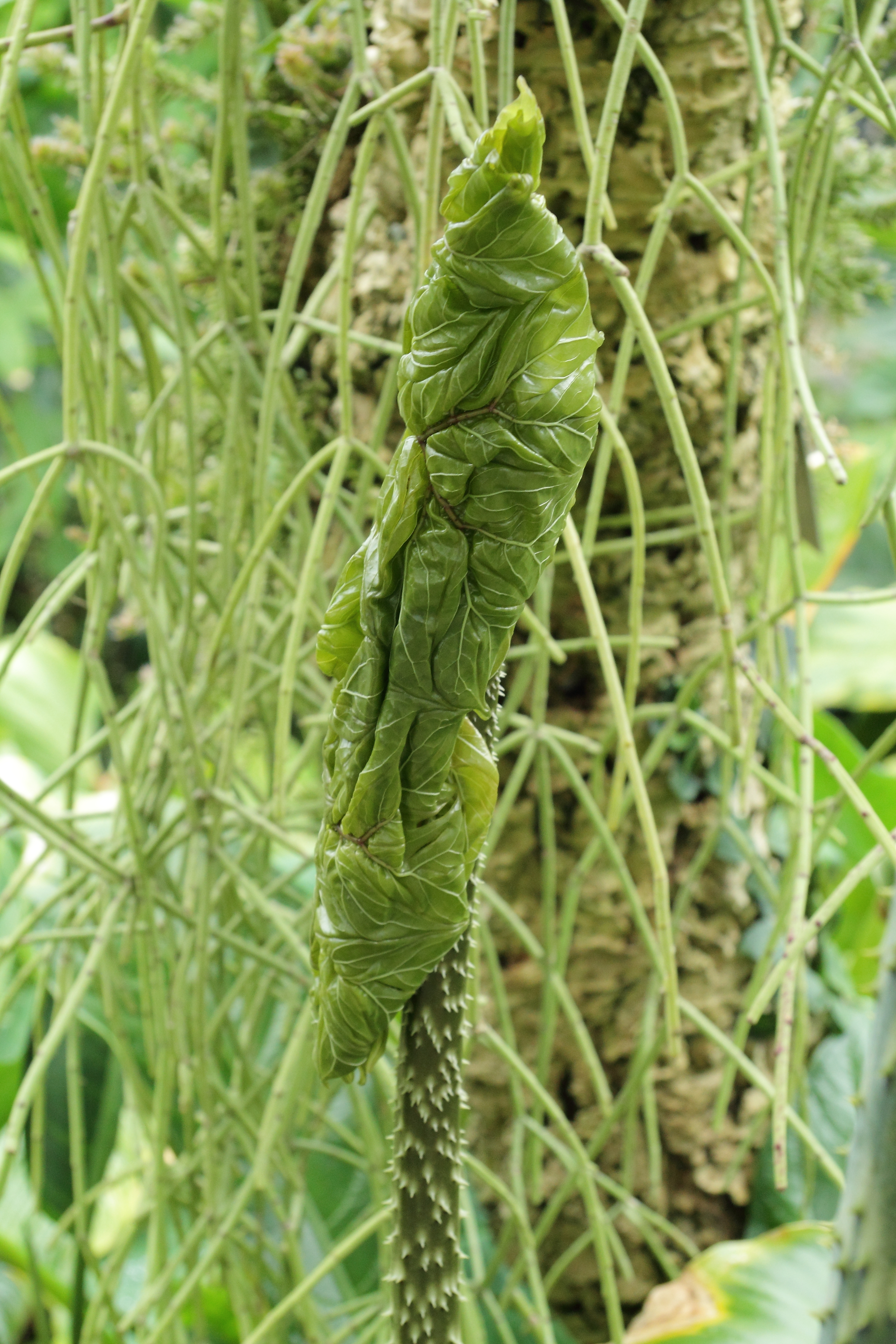

Scientific classification
- Kingdom: Plantae
- Clade: Tracheophytes
- Clade: Angiosperms
- Clade: Monocots
- Order: Alismatales
- Family: Araceae
- Genus: Anchomanes
- Species: A. difformis

Binomial name
- Anchomanes difformis (Blume) Engl.

Synonyms
- Amorphophallus difformis Blume; Anchomanes difformis var. welwitschii (Rendle) Engl.; Anchomanes dubius Schott; Anchomanes hookeri (Kunth) Schott; Anchomanes hookeri var. pallidus Hook.; Anchomanes obtusus A.Chev.; Anchomanes petiolatus (Hook.) Hutch.; Anchomanes welwitschii Rendle; Caladium petiolatum Hook.; Cyrtosperma congoensis L.Linden; Pythonium hookeri Kunth; Sauromatum ferox Linden ex Engl.

= Anchomanes difformis =

Species of plant

Anchomanes difformis is a plant found in much of subsaharan Africa and is a member of the arum family, the Araceae.

== Description ==
It is a perennial plant with a very large tuberous rhizome up to 30 cm (12 in) wide and extending along the surface for several metres, up from which spring a cluster of prickly leaves on stout stalks (petioles) more than 3 m (10 ft) in height, with three major divisions of the blade (lamina) bearing many squared-off leaflets. Emerging from this same rhizome are pink spathes 30 cm (12 in) high atop a peduncle up to 75 cm (30 in) in height. The rhizome is exceeded in size only by Nypa fruticans and Dendrocalamus species.
