= Fenestratarum =

Scientific classification
- Kingdom: Plantae
- Clade: Tracheophytes
- Clade: Angiosperms
- Clade: Monocots
- Order: Alismatales
- Family: Araceae
- Subfamily: Aroideae
- Tribe: Schismatoglottideae
- Genus: Fenestratarum; P.C.Boyce & S.Y.Wong

Species
- See text

Genus of Araceae plants

Fenestratarum is a genus of flowering plants in the arum family Araceae, native to Borneo. There are only two known species, which are found on different soil types (sandstone and basalt) and 600 km apart, furthermore each is restricted to one local population.

== Species ==
Currently accepted species include:

- Fenestratarum culum P.C.Boyce & S.Y.Wong
- Fenestratarum mulayadii P.C.Boyce & S.Y.Wong
