= Carlephyton =

Scientific classification
- Kingdom: Plantae
- Clade: Tracheophytes
- Clade: Angiosperms
- Clade: Monocots
- Order: Alismatales
- Family: Araceae
- Subfamily: Aroideae
- Tribe: Arophyteae
- Genus: Carlephyton; Jum.

Species
- Carlephyton darainense; Carlephyton diegonse; Carlephyton glaucophyllum; Carlephyton madagascariense

Genus of flowering plants

Carlephyton is a genus of four species in the family Araceae, all endemic to Madagascar.

== Description ==
The species in this genus are seasonally dormant tubers. The leaves are cordate with a sub-marginal collective vein. The fine venation is reticulate. There are usually one to three leaves. The petiole sheath is short. Inflorescences are typical aroids with a spathe and spadix. It has no sterile appendix and its flowers, usually one to three, are unisexual. The spathe is not constricted and the lower part is persistent in anthesis. The berries tend to be orange-red.

== Habitat ==
They are known to grow in tropical deciduous forests on limestone or basalt or in rock crevices.

== Species ==
Four species are accepted:

- Carlephyton darainense Bogner & Nusb.
- Carlephyton diegonse Bogner
- Carlephyton glaucophyllum Bogner
- Carlephyton madagascariense Jum.
