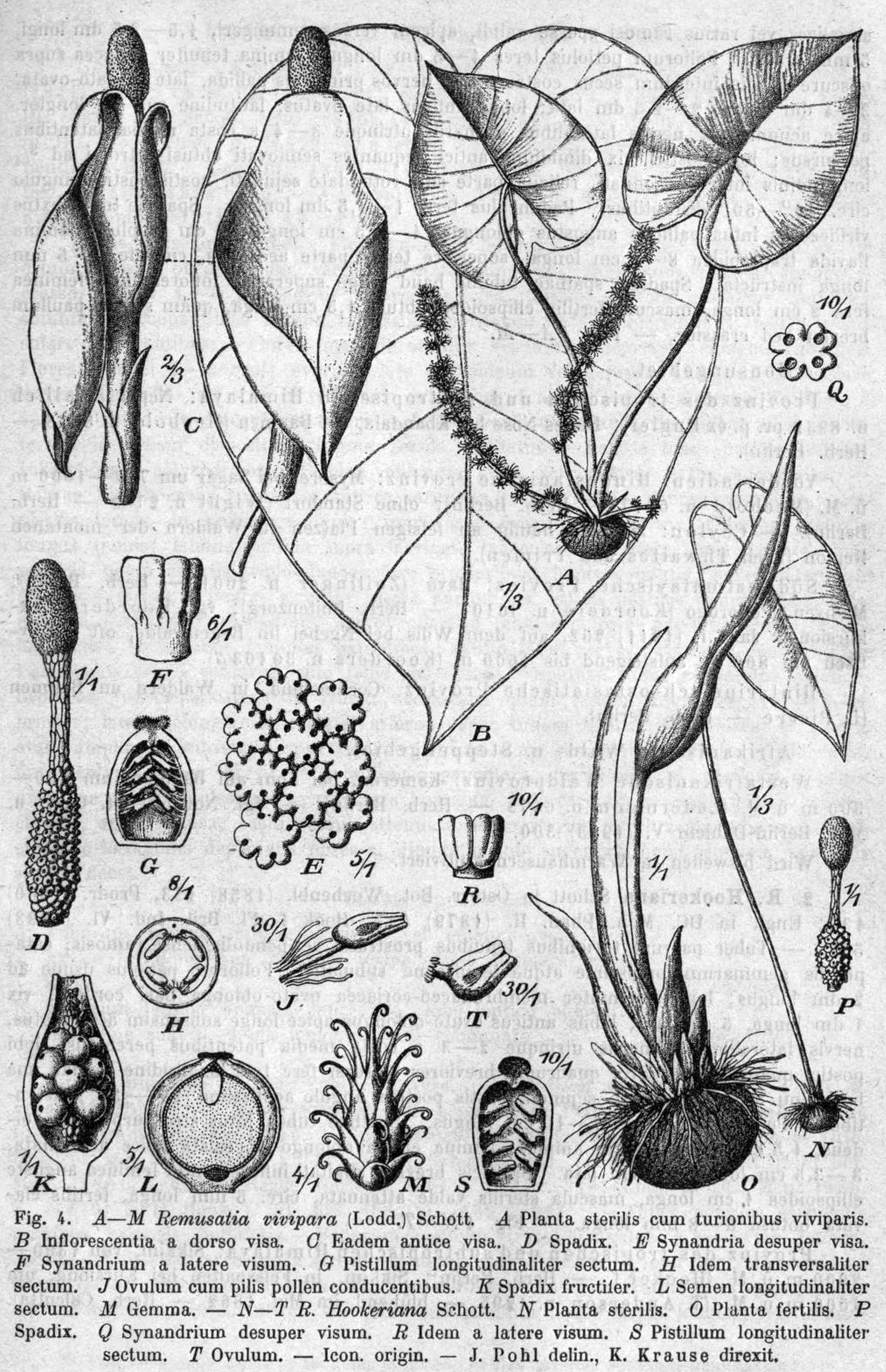
- Remusatia vivipara (A-M) Remusatia hookeriana (N-T)

Scientific classification
- Kingdom: Plantae
- Clade: Tracheophytes
- Clade: Angiosperms
- Clade: Monocots
- Order: Alismatales
- Family: Araceae
- Subfamily: Aroideae
- Tribe: Colocasieae
- Genus: Remusatia; Schott
- Range of the genus Remusatia

Synonyms
- Gonatanthus Klotzsch

= Remusatia =

Genus of flowering plants

Remusatia is a genus of flowering plants in the family Araceae. It contains 4 known species, one of which was described in 1987. This species was initially placed in genus Gonatanthus called Gonatanthus ornatus. After the genus had been sunk into Remusatia its new name was Remusatia ornatus, but it was later changed to Remusatia hookeriana.

The species of Remusatia are native to Asia, Africa, and Australia. They are typically found in subtropical forests and are tuberous plants with heart shaped peltate leaves. A characteristic feature of Remusatia is its stolons that emerge from the tubers on which is produced bulbils that allow the plant to reproduce. The bulbils cling to animals which allows for them to be distributed and is likely the primary cause for their large distribution. Flowering of many Remusatias are often rare and bulbils serve as their primary means of reproduction. The spathes of Remusatia are yellow and the spadix are white with a fragrance except for Remusatia yunnanensis whose spathe is red.

Species

1. Remusatia hookeriana Schott - Yunnan, Assam, Arunachal Pradesh, Bhutan, Nepal, Myanmar, Thailand, Himalayas of eastern + northern India
2. Remusatia pumila (D.Don) H.Li & A.Hay - Tibet, Yunnan, Assam, Arunachal Pradesh, Bhutan, Nepal, Thailand, Himalayas of eastern + northern India
3. Remusatia vivipara (Roxb.) Schott - central + western Africa from Tanzania and Ethiopia to Sierra Leone; Oman, Yemen, Taiwan, Tibet, Yunnan, Indian Subcontinent, Indochina, Java, Bali, Christmas Island, Queensland, Northern Territory of Australia
4. Remusatia yunnanensis (H.Li & A.Hay) A.Hay in R.H.A.Govaerts & D.G.Frodin - Yunnan, Taiwan
