= Scaphispatha =

Scientific classification
- Kingdom: Plantae
- Clade: Tracheophytes
- Clade: Angiosperms
- Clade: Monocots
- Order: Alismatales
- Family: Araceae
- Subfamily: Aroideae
- Tribe: Caladieae
- Genus: Scaphispatha; Brongn. ex Schott

Genus of flowering plants

Scaphispatha is a genus of flowering plants in the family Araceae. It contains two species, S. gracilis and S. robusta. The genus was believed to be monotypic until 2003 when a new species, S. robusta was discovered by Eduardo Gomes Gonçalves in northern Brazil. The plant had been grown in cultivation for some years, but had always been assumed to be a Caladium until it flowered.

- Scaphispatha gracilis Brongn. ex Schott - Bolivia, Brazil
- Scaphispatha robusta E.G.Gonç. - Pará, Mato Grosso, Tocantins, Goiás
