= Furtadoa =

Scientific classification
- Kingdom: Plantae
- Clade: Tracheophytes
- Clade: Angiosperms
- Clade: Monocots
- Order: Alismatales
- Family: Araceae
- Subfamily: Aroideae
- Tribe: Homalomeneae
- Genus: Furtadoa; M.Hotta 1981

Genus of flowering plants

Furtadoa is a genus of flowering plants in the family Araceae. It consists of only two species: Furtadoa mixta and Furtadoa sumatrensis.

== Taxonomic history ==
The genus was described in 1981 by Mitsuru Hotta, with one species endemic on Sumatra. In 1985, Hotta transferred a preexisting species of Homalomena (the West Malaysian H. mixtum Ridl.) to Furtadoa.

== Description ==
Both described species of Furtadoa have stems that creep, and root along their length (a very rare condition in related Homalomena), and leathery elliptical leaves. The inflorescence is carried on a long peduncle, with the spathes unconstricted, and either green, reddish brown, or purple-grey. The spadix is unique by having the male flowers (except for those at the tip of the spadix) each associated with a sterile female flower (a pistillode) in addition to each fertile female flower being associated with a sterile male flower (staminode).
