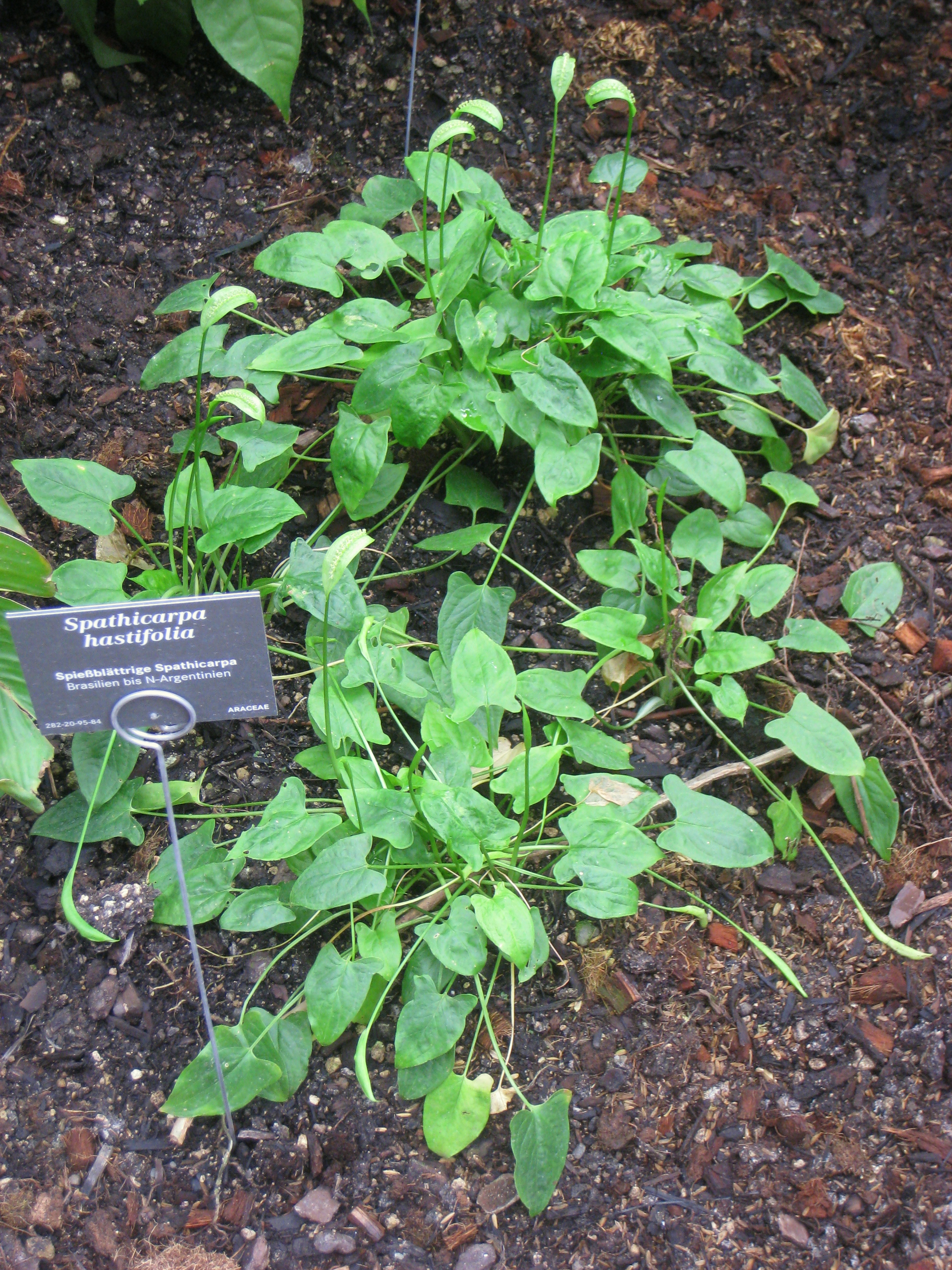
- Spathicarpa hastifolia

Scientific classification
- Kingdom: Plantae
- Clade: Tracheophytes
- Clade: Angiosperms
- Clade: Monocots
- Order: Alismatales
- Family: Araceae
- Subfamily: Aroideae
- Tribe: Spathicarpeae
- Genus: Spathicarpa; Hook.

Synonyms
- Aropsis Rojas Acosta

= Spathicarpa =

Genus of flowering plants

Spathicarpa is a genus of flowering plants in the family Araceae, all of which are endemic to South America. Spathicarpa species are notable for the fact that the entirety of their spadix is fused to the spathe. The genus is believed to be closely related to Spathantheum. The tribe Spathicarpeae is named after the genus Spathicarpa.

== Species ==
1. Spathicarpa gardneri Schott - Brazil
2. Spathicarpa hastifolia Hook. - Brazil, Bolivia, Paraguay, Uruguay, northeastern Argentina
3. Spathicarpa lanceolata Engl. - Paraguay, southern Brazil
