= Carlephyton glaucophyllum =

Conservation status
- Vulnerable (IUCN 3.1)

Scientific classification
- Kingdom: Plantae
- Clade: Tracheophytes
- Clade: Angiosperms
- Clade: Monocots
- Order: Alismatales
- Family: Araceae
- Genus: Carlephyton
- Species: C. glaucophyllum

Binomial name
- Carlephyton glaucophyllum Bogner

Species of flowering plant

Carlephyton glaucophyllum is a species of arum endemic to Madagascar.

== Description ==
It differs from the two other species in the genus in that it has some bisexual flowers present concurrent to the female flowers. It has a short spadix and the leaves are glaucous.

It flowers in December. The berries are possibly yellowish.

== Range and habitat ==
Carlephyton glaucophyllum is native to northern and northeastern Madagascar, where it is known from four populations. It is found in dry forests between sea level and 500 meters elevation. It is typically found growing in clusters.

It was described by Josef Bogner in 1972.
