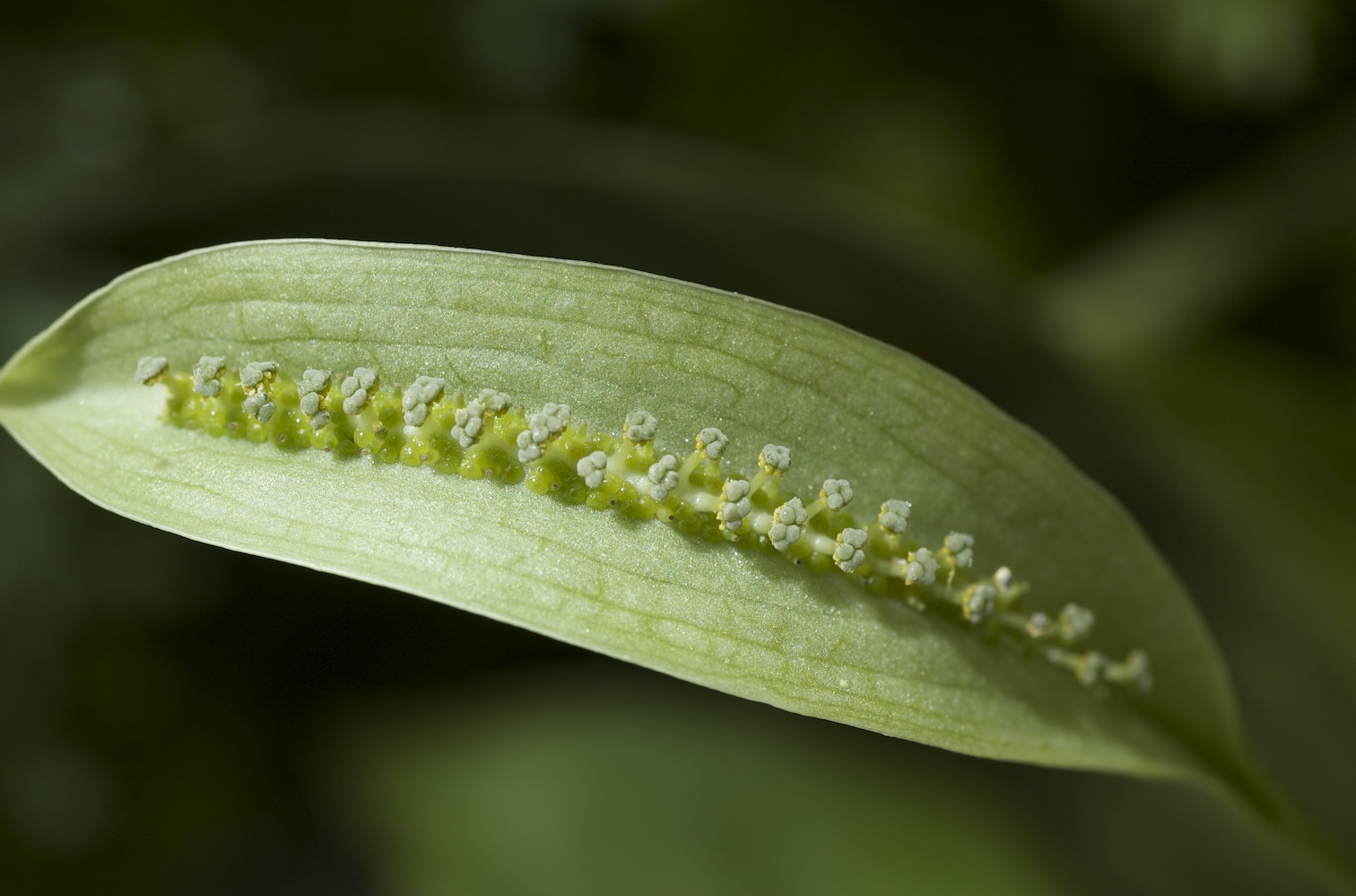
- Spathicarpa hastifolia

Scientific classification
- Kingdom: Plantae
- Clade: Tracheophytes
- Clade: Angiosperms
- Clade: Monocots
- Order: Alismatales
- Family: Araceae
- Genus: Spathicarpa
- Species: S. hastifolia

Binomial name
- Spathicarpa hastifolia Hook.

= Spathicarpa hastifolia =

Species of flowering plant

Spathicarpa hastifolia is a species of flowering plants in the family Araceae, endemic to South America.

== Synonyms ==
- Aropsis palustris
- Spathicarpa cornuta
- Spathicarpa platyspatha
- Spathicarpa sagittifolia
- Spathicarpa sagittifolia var. gardneri
- Spathicarpa sagittifolia var. longicuspis
- Spathicarpa sagittifolia var. platyspatha
- Spathicarpa sagittifolia var. typica
