= Scaphispatha gracilis =

Scientific classification
- Kingdom: Plantae
- Clade: Tracheophytes
- Clade: Angiosperms
- Clade: Monocots
- Order: Alismatales
- Family: Araceae
- Genus: Scaphispatha
- Species: S. gracilis

Binomial name
- Scaphispatha gracilis Brongn. ex Schott

Species of flowering plant

Scaphispatha gracilis is a species in the family Araceae. This species is native to Brazil and Bolivia, and has peltate leaves that resembles those in the genus Caladium. The species was described by Heinrich Wilhelm Schott in 1860 after he received an inflorescence of the plant. He had not however seen the plant itself and it was not rediscovered until 1976 when Josef Bogner collected tubers from the plant and successfully flowered them at the Munich Botanic Garden. Upon seeing the inflorescence it was realized that this was the plant Schott had originally described.
