= Bakoa =

Scientific classification
- Kingdom: Plantae
- Clade: Tracheophytes
- Clade: Angiosperms
- Clade: Monocots
- Order: Alismatales
- Family: Araceae
- Subfamily: Aroideae
- Tribe: Schismatoglottideae
- Genus: Bakoa; P.C.Boyce & S.Y.Wong 2008

Genus of flowering plants

Bakoa is a genus of plants in the family Araceae. It has three known species, all endemic to the island of Borneo.

- Bakoa brevipedunculata (H.Okada & Y.Mori) S.Y.Wong - Kalimantan
- Bakoa lucens (Bogner) P.C.Boyce & S.Y.Wong - Sarawak
- Bakoa nakamotoi S.Y.Wong - Kalimantan
