= Pursegloveia =

Scientific classification
- Kingdom: Plantae
- Clade: Tracheophytes
- Clade: Angiosperms
- Clade: Monocots
- Order: Alismatales
- Family: Araceae
- Tribe: Schismatoglottideae
- Genus: Pursegloveia; S.Y.Wong, S.L.Low & P.C.Boyce

Genus of plants

Pursegloveia is a genus of flowering plants belonging to the subfamily Aroideae in the family Araceae.

Its native range is Borneo.

Species:

- Pursegloveia aegis S.Y.Wong & P.C.Boyce
- Pursegloveia ashtonii (S.Y.Wong & P.C.Boyce) S.Y.Wong & P.C.Boyce
- Pursegloveia burttii (Bogner & Nicolson) S.Y.Wong & P.C.Boyce
- Pursegloveia kazuyae (S.Y.Wong, P.C.Boyce & S.L.Low) S.Y.Wong & P.C.Boyce
- Pursegloveia minima (H.Okada) S.Y.Wong & P.C.Boyce
- Pursegloveia orientalis (S.Y.Wong, P.C.Boyce & S.L.Low) S.Y.Wong & P.C.Boyce
