= Incarum =

Scientific classification
- Kingdom: Plantae
- Clade: Tracheophytes
- Clade: Angiosperms
- Clade: Monocots
- Order: Alismatales
- Family: Araceae
- Subfamily: Aroideae
- Tribe: Spathicarpeae
- Genus: Incarum; E.G.Gonç.
- Species: I. pavonii

Binomial name
- Incarum pavonii (Schott) E.G.Gonç.

Synonyms
- Asterostigma pavonii Schott; Staurostigma pavonii (Schott) K.Koch ex Ender

Genus of flowering plants

Incarum is a genus of plants in the family Araceae. It has only one known species, Incarum pavonii, native to western South America (Ecuador, Peru, Bolivia).
