= Bartolomeo Ambrosini =

Italian botanist and physician (1588–1657)

Doctor of Medicine Bartolomeo Ambrosini
- Born: 1588; Bologna, Papal States
- Died: 3 February 1657 (aged 68–69); Bologna, Papal States
- Occupations: botanist, physician, naturalist
- Parent: Agostino Ambrosini
- Relatives: Giacinto Ambrosini (brother)

Academic background
- Education: University of Bologna
- Influences: Ulisse Aldrovandi

Academic work
- Discipline: Botanist, physician and naturalist
- Institutions: University of Bologna; Botanical Garden of Bologna
- Notable students: Ovidio Montalbani
- Influenced: Carl Linnaeus

Bartolomeo Ambrosini (1588 – 3 February 1657) was an Italian botanist, physician and naturalist, for over thirty years prefect of the Botanical Garden of Bologna and editor of many of the posthumous works of Ulisse Aldrovandi.

== Biography ==
Bartolomeo Ambrosini was born in Bologna in 1588. Older brother of Giacinto (1605 - 1672), also a botanist, he earned degrees in philosophy and medicine at the University of Bologna in 1610. Here, as early as 1612, he taught at first logic, then medicine, finally botany from 1619, and after Uterverio's death he was appointed prefect of the natural history museum and botanical garden of Bologna, serving in that position from 1642 until his death. When the plague affected Italy in 1630, he worked hard as a volunteer doctor for his city, also issuing a handbook entitled Modo e facile preserva e Cura di Peste. He died in 1657. Linnaeus dedicated to him the genus Ambrosina of the family Araceae, and the Archiginnasio of Bologna keeps two monuments (an epigraph and a bust) in his memory.

== Works ==
He published several works on botany and medicine, but is perhaps better known by having been commissioned by the Senate of Bologna to edit several volumes of the major works left unfinished by Aldrovandi, including the History of snakes and dragons (Bologna, 1639) and the History of monsters (Bologna, 1642). But Ambrosini also published works of his own, especially of medical and pharmacopeic. His botanical works consist of two small volumes. One of these was on the various plants which have been named after, or dedicated on account of their properties to saints, or called after sacred things. The title of this work is Panacea ex Herbis quæ a Sanctis denominantur concinnata Opus. Bologna, 1630. This book gives an account of the properties, real or supposed, which the plants dedicated to holy persons or things possess. The other botanical work was on the capsicum plant, and has the title De Capsicorum Varietate cum suis Iconibus brevis Historia. Bologna, 1630. It is illustrated with several drawings of the fruits of various species of capsicum, and gives a full detail of their history and properties. In 1657 he published a number of plates from the works of Aldrovandi with short descriptions, entitled Paralipomena accuratissima historiae omnium animalium quae in voluminibus Aldrovandi desiderantur.

The works of Aldrovandi which he edited were those on quadrupeds, reptiles, and monsters, forming the ninth, tenth, eleventh, and twelfth volumes of the folio edition of his works. In addition to these works on natural history he published several on medicine. The following are the titles as given by Manget: 1° "On the Treatment and Preservation from the Influence of the Plague" (Modo e facile preserva e Cura di Peste a beneficio del Popolo di Bologna). Bologna, 1631. 2° "On Theoretical Medicine" (Theorica Medicina in Tabulas veluti digesta cum aliquot Consultationibus). Bologna, 1632. 3° "On the Pulse" (De Pulsibus). Bologna, 1645. 4° "On external Diseases" (De externis Malis Opusculum). Bologna, 1656. 5° "On the Urine" (De Urinis); and others.

== Main works ==
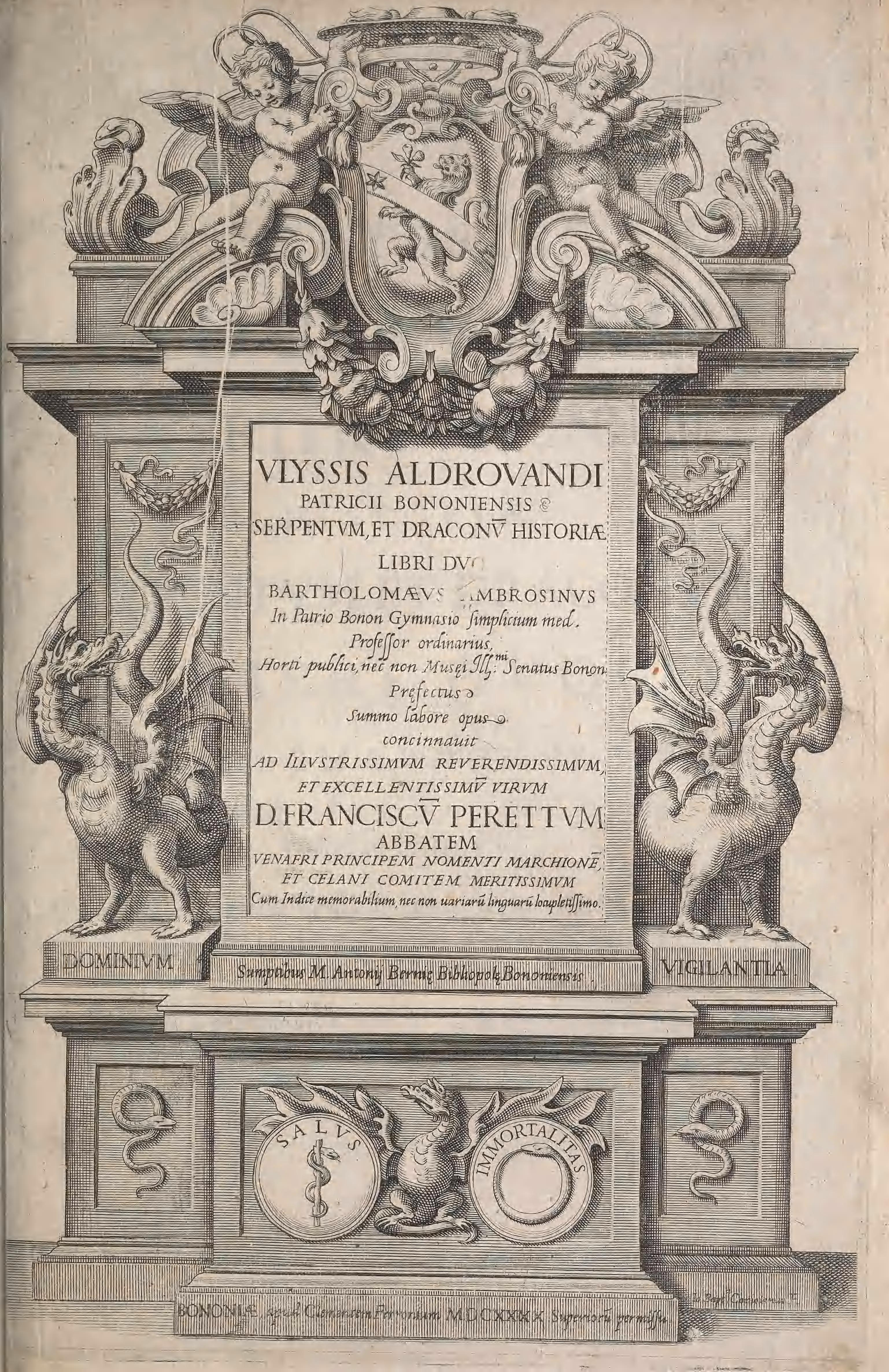
Title page of "Serpentum, et draconum historiæ libri duo" by Aldrovandi edited by Bartolomeo Ambrosini and published in 1639.

=== Aldrovandine ===
- (Editing), De quadrupedibus digitatis viuiparis libri tres, et De quadrupedibus digitatis ouiparis libri duo, Bologna 1637 (online).
- (Editing), Serpentum, et draconum historiae libri duo, Bologna 1639 (online).
- (Editing), Monstrorum historia cum Paralipomenis historiae omnium animalium, Bologna 1642 (online).
- (Editing), Musaeum metallicum in libros 4 distributum, Bologna 1648 (online).

=== Miscellaneous ===
- Panacea ex herbis quae a sanctis denominantur concinnata (in Latin). Bononiae: apud haeredes Victorij Benatij. 1630.
- Theorica medica in tabulas veluti digesta (in Latin). Bononiae. 1632.
- De pulsibus (in Latin). Bononiae. 1645.
- De externis malis (in Latin). Bononiae. 1656.
- Paralipomena accuratissima historiae omnium animalium quæ in voluminibus Aldrouandi desiderantur (in Latin). Bononiae: Typis I. B. Ferronij. 1657.

== Bibliography ==
- Serafino Mazzetti, Repertorio di tutti i professori antichi, e moderni della famosa Università, e del celebre Istituto delle Scienze di Bologna, Bologna 1848, p. 22, ad vocem.
- Giammaria Mazzucchelli, Gli scrittori d'Italia cioè notizie storiche, e critiche intorno alle vite, e agli scritti dei letterati italiani, vol. I, pars II, Brescia 1753, pp. 613–614, ad vocem.
- The Biographical Dictionary of the Society for the Diffusion of Useful Knowledge. Longman, Brown, Green, and Longmans. 1843.
