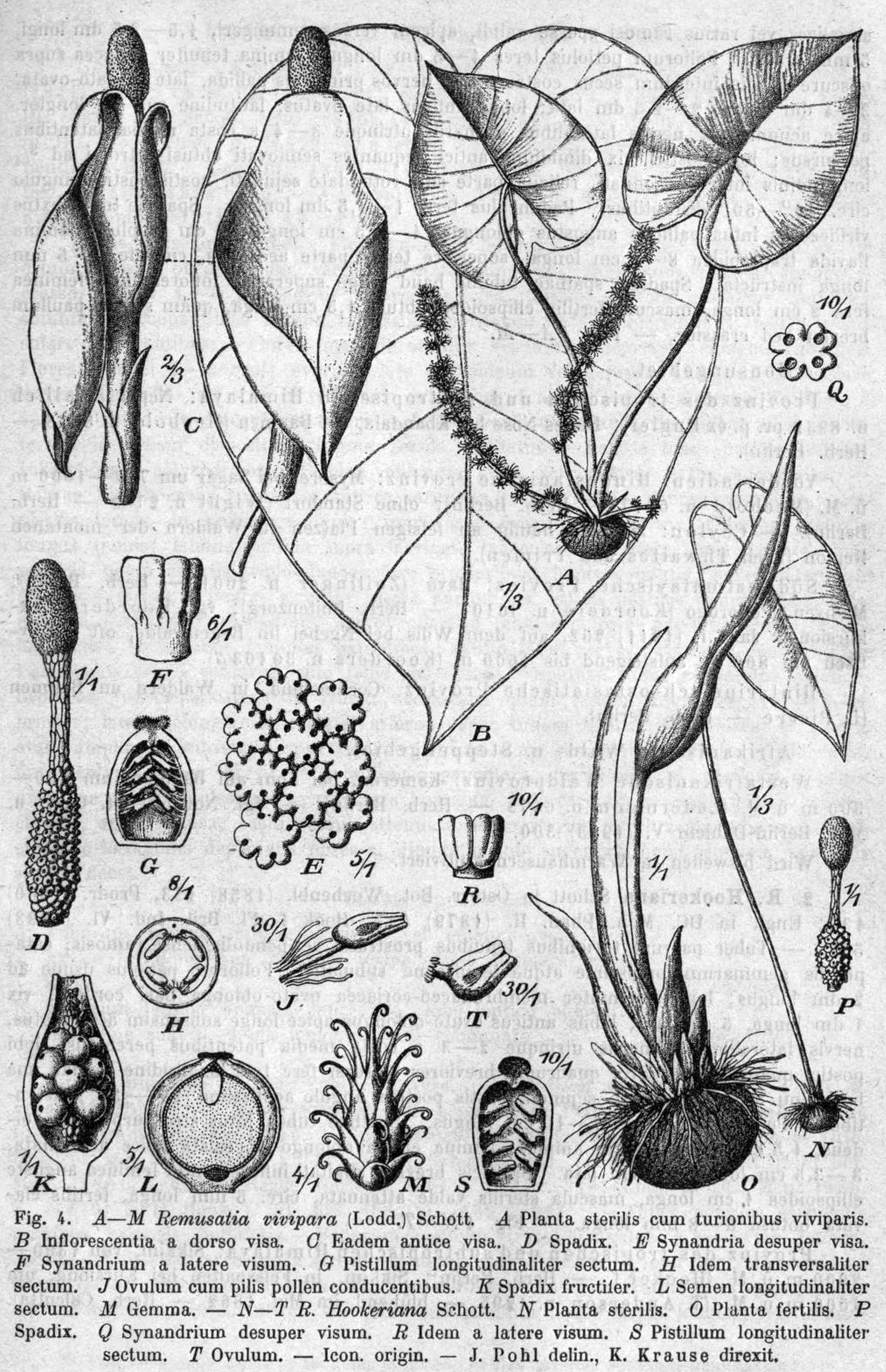
- Illustration of Remusatia vivipara

Scientific classification
- Kingdom: Plantae
- Clade: Tracheophytes
- Clade: Angiosperms
- Clade: Monocots
- Order: Alismatales
- Family: Araceae
- Genus: Remusatia
- Species: R. vivipara

Binomial name
- Remusatia vivipara Schott

Synonyms
- Arum viviparum Roxb.; Caladium viviparum Roxb. Nees; Colocasia vivipara Thwaites; Remusatia formosana Hayata

= Remusatia vivipara =

Species of herb

Remusatia vivipara also called hitchhiker elephant ear is a perennial herb growing up to 50 cm tall in the genus Remusatia. It is widespread throughout the world, growing in temperate climates.

== Description ==
Remusatia vivipara is a rupicolous or epiphytic herb that grows up to 50 cm tall, arising from an underground tuber around 2–4 cm in diameter and coloured vivid red. Its bulbils are scaly and ovoid, around 5 mm long, scales ending in hooked prickles. The leaf is solitary, is broad and peltate, 10–40 cm long and 5–30 cm across, with a petiole up to 40 cm long. R.vivipara very rarely flowers. Spathe is leathery, 10–13 cm long with an ovoid tube which is green. Spadix is around 3.5 cm long, clavate and creamy white with the flowers unisexual and congested, female at base, male at tip, separated by sterile flowers in the middle. Fruits a cluster of berries.

== Distribution and habitat ==
Remusatia vivipara can be found in Central and Western Africa, from Tanzania and Ethiopia to Sierra Leone; Oman, Yemen, Taiwan, Tibet, Yunnan, India, Indochina, Java and Northern Australia. Remusatia viviparais can be found in subtropical forests, on rocks, cliff edges around 700m-1900m above sea level. It is epiphytic in leaf litter traps on large trees such as Ficus vasta.

It rarely flowers in Asia, whilst in Africa it never flowers and there are no observations of Remusatia vivipara flowering in Arabia. However, the small bulbils that appear on the plant are readily detached and can be carried hundreds of kilometres by clinging to the feathers of birds. This accounts for the wide distribution of the species.

== Uses ==
Tubers are edible when cooked very thoroughly either by roasting or boiling to deactivate the oxalate crystals. They are eaten in Dhofar with clarified butter or buttermilk and eaten in India added to curries.
