= Arophyton =

Scientific classification
- Kingdom: Plantae
- Clade: Tracheophytes
- Clade: Angiosperms
- Clade: Monocots
- Order: Alismatales
- Family: Araceae
- Subfamily: Aroideae
- Tribe: Arophyteae
- Genus: Arophyton; Jum.

Synonyms
- Synandrogyne Buchet; Humbertina Buchet

Genus of flowering plants

Arophyton is a genus of flowering plants in the family Araceae. It consists of 7 species that are found only in northeast Madagascar. Arophyton are tuberous plants with a few rhizomatous species that go through a dormant period during the dry season.

== Species ==
1. Arophyton buchetii
2. Arophyton crassifolium
3. Arophyton humbertii
4. Arophyton pedatum
5. Arophyton rhizomatosum
6. Arophyton simplex
7. Arophyton tripartitum
