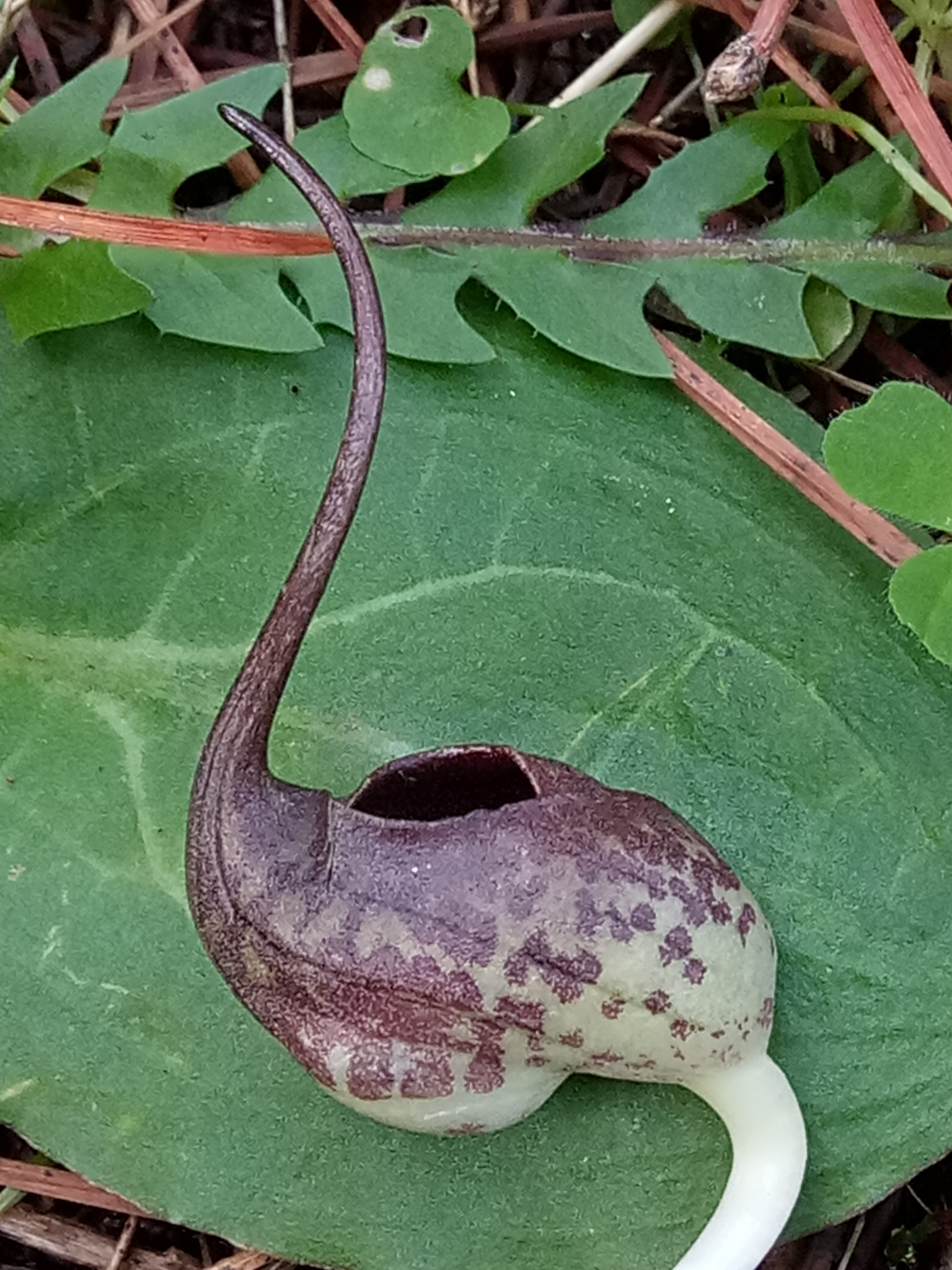
- Lateral view of an Ambrosina bassii inflorescence
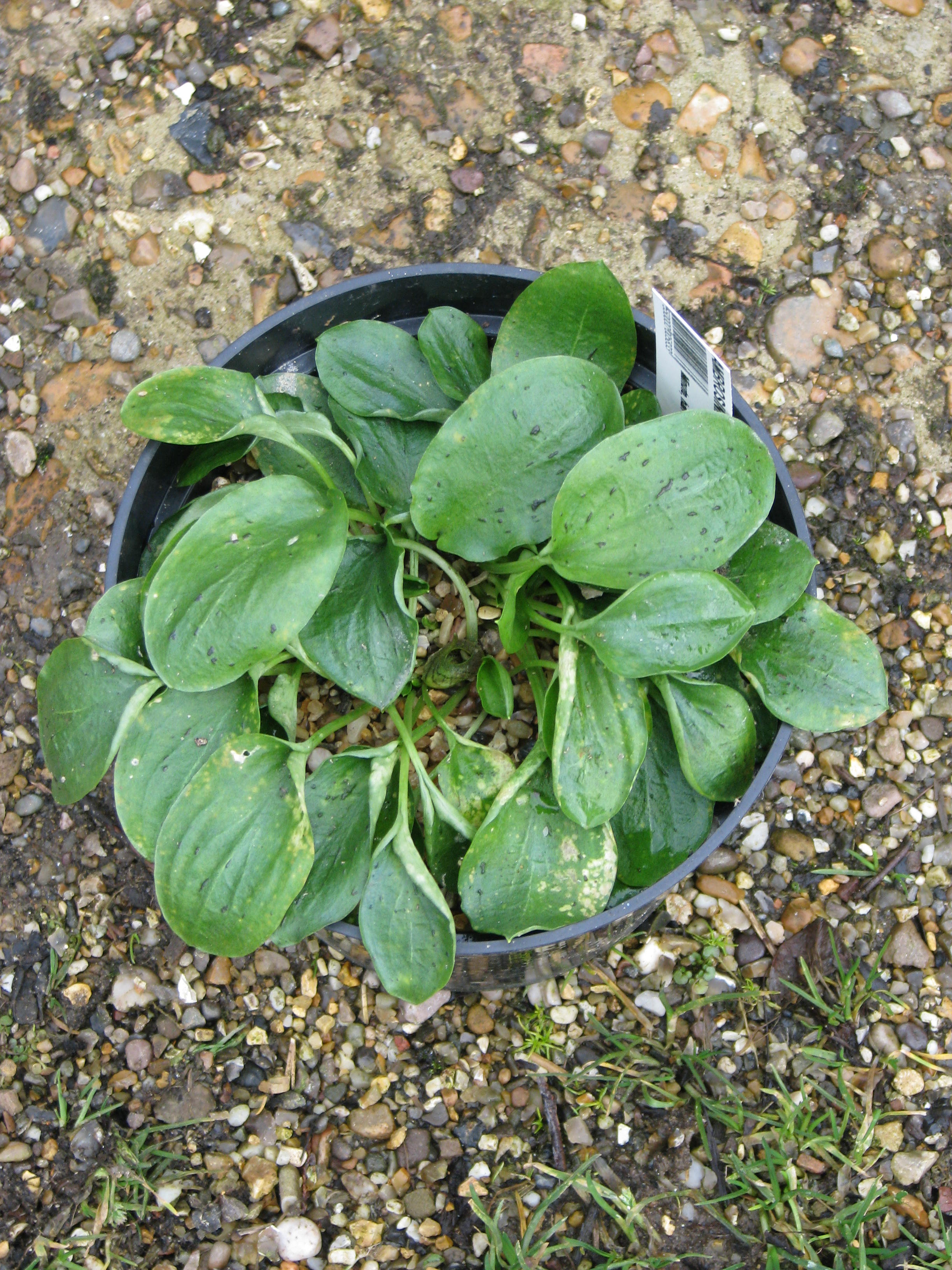
- Flowering Ambrosina bassii specimen in cultivation

Conservation status
- Least Concern (IUCN 3.1)

Scientific classification
- Kingdom: Plantae
- Clade: Tracheophytes
- Clade: Angiosperms
- Clade: Monocots
- Order: Alismatales
- Family: Araceae
- Subfamily: Aroideae
- Tribe: Ambrosineae
- Genus: Ambrosina; Bassi
- Species: A. bassii

Binomial name
- Ambrosina bassii L.

Synonyms
- Ambrosina bassii var. angustifolia Guss.; Ambrosina bassii var. maculata (Ucria) Parl.; Ambrosina bassii var. reticulata (Tineo) Parl.; Ambrosina maculata Ucria; Ambrosina nervosa Lam.; Ambrosina proboscidea T.Durand & Schinz; Ambrosina reticulata Tineo; Ambrosina velutina Blume ex Heynh.

= Ambrosina =

Ambrosina Temporal range: 46.1 –0 Ma Middle Eocene – Recent

Genus of flowering plants

Ambrosina is a genus in the family Araceae that consists of only one species, Ambrosina bassii, and the only genus in the tribe Ambrosineae. This species is the smallest terrestrial aroid in the Mediterranean, growing only to 8 cm tall. It is usually found growing in woodlands on north faces of hillsides and in humus soil that is covering limestone. It is distributed in Sardinia, Corsica, Sicily, southern mainland Italy, Tunisia, and Algeria.

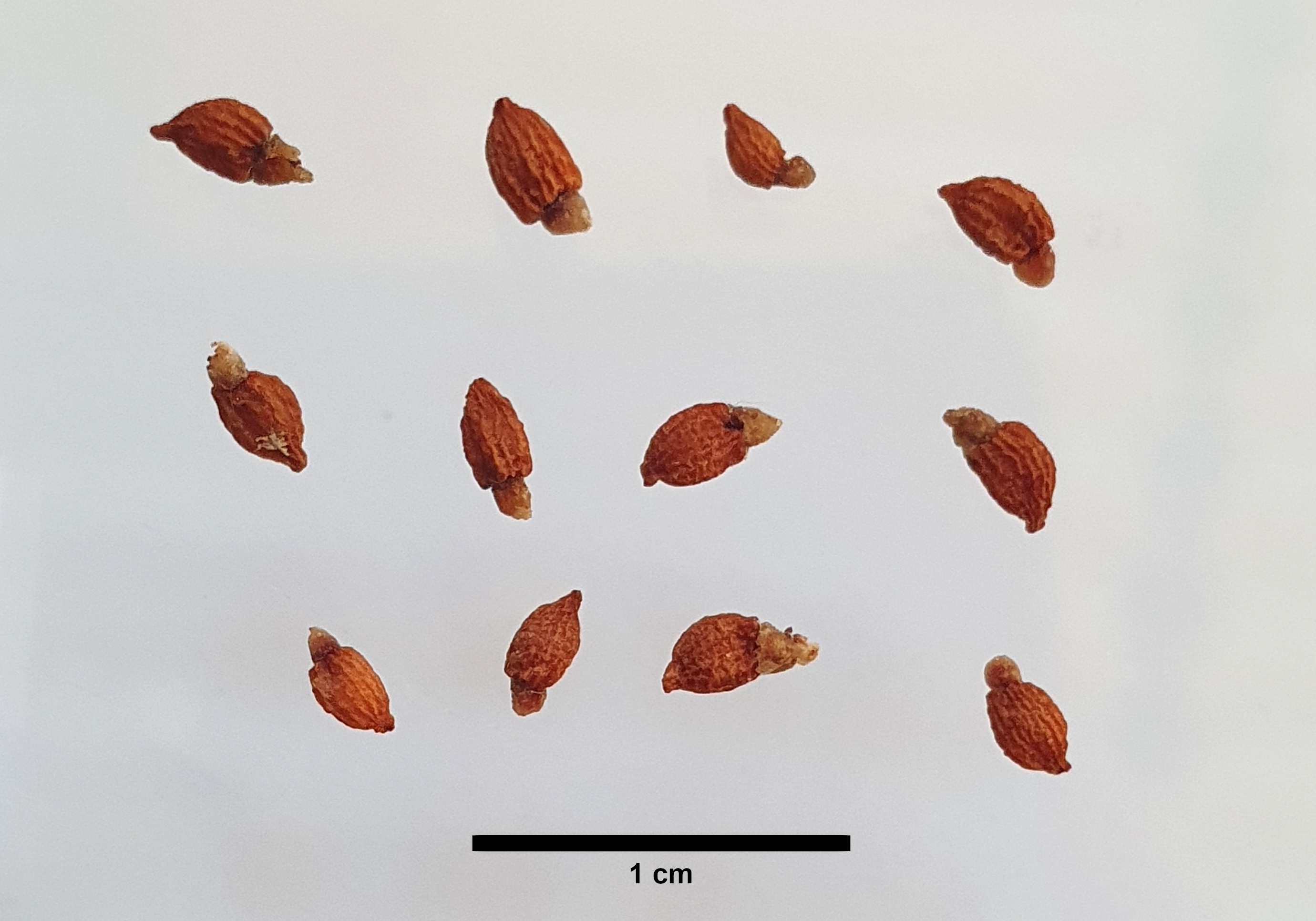
Seeds of Ambrosina bassii L.

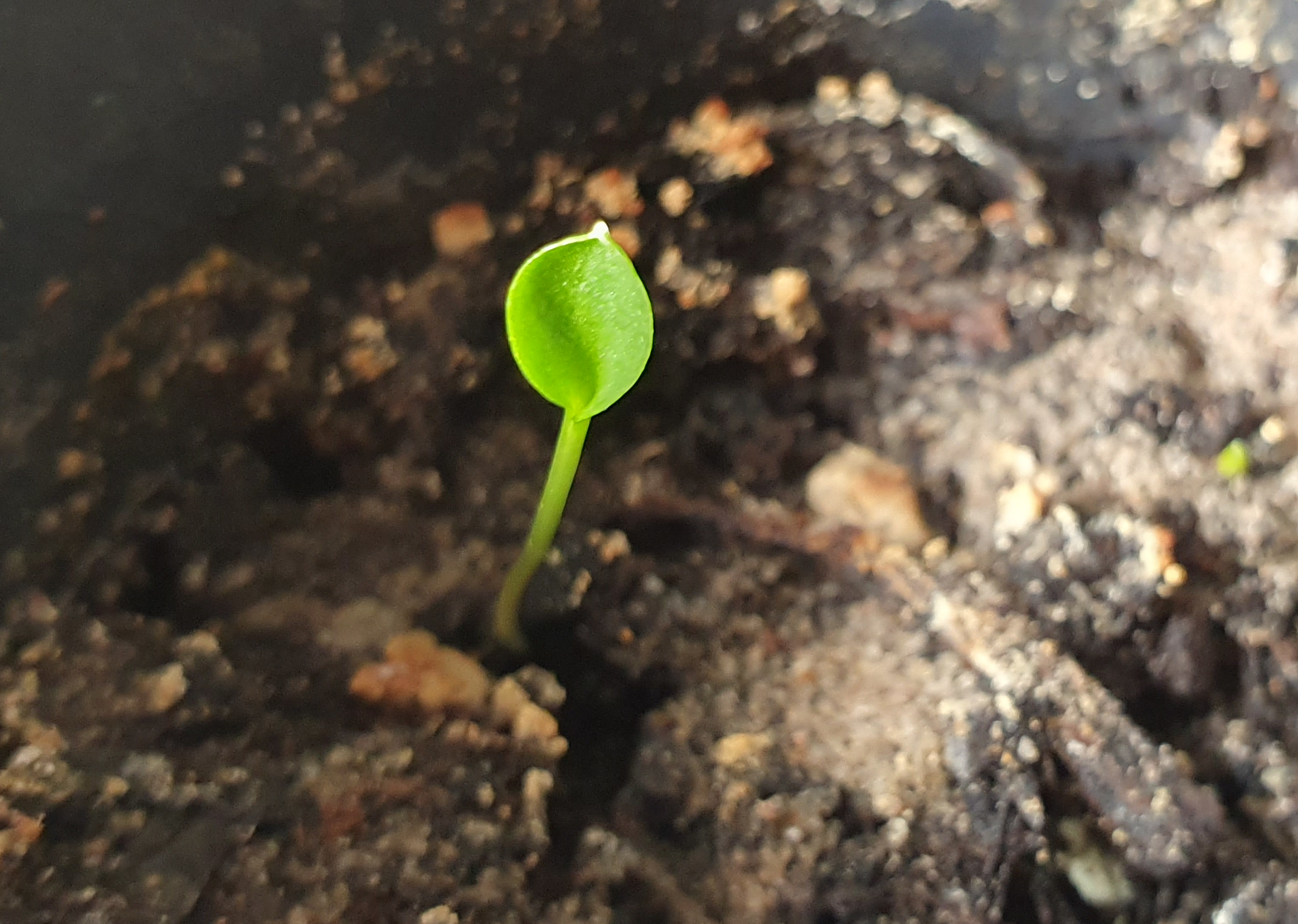
Seedlings of Ambrosina bassii L.

== Description ==
Ambrosina bassii has oval leaves that are 3.5 to 6 cm long and resemble the leaves of many aroid seedlings. The inflorescence is 2.5 cm long bent over and has an unusual spathe. The spathe is shaped like an egg and is greenish brown with dots on it. Inside the egg shaped spathe is divided two chambers. In one chamber is contained a single female flower and in the other are 8 to 10 male flowers. The seeds have an elaiosome. However, seeds are rarely formed, as this species exhibits a low reproductive rate.

=== Pollen ===
The inaperturate pollen grains are 26–50 μm big. It disperses as a single grain (monad).

== Population genetics ==
Ambrosina is the only representative of its genus and is quite unique. It has been shown that it has high heterozygosity, as it has an average of two loci per allele. The data represents that genetic variation attributes to differences among populations from different geographical territories. Also, the local anthropogenic fragmentation has caused no time for genetic drift or interbreeding to erode genetic variation, this eventually resulted in generating differences between populations. The effective population size is low in natural populations.

== Phylogeny ==
It is closely related to the genera Arisarum, Peltandra, and Typhonodorum. Ambrosina is the sister group to Arisarum, from which it separated about 46.1 Million years ago.

The precise relationships are displayed in the following cladogram:

- - - Ambrosineae
      Ambrosina
    - Arisareae
      Arisarum
  - Peltandreae
    - Typhonodorum
    - Peltandra

== Taxonomy ==
=== Species ===
The genus is monotypic and only consists of Ambrosina bassii.

=== Varieties ===
The following three varieties have been described:

- Ambrosina bassii var. angustifolia Guss.
- Ambrosina bassii var. maculata (Ucria) Parl.
- Ambrosina bassii var. reticulata (Tineo) Parl.

However, none of them are accepted.

=== Former species ===
Multiple species have been moved from the genus Ambrosina to Cryptocoryne:

- Ambrosina ciliaris Spreng. is a synonym of Cryptocoryne ciliata var. ciliata
- Ambrosina ciliata Roxb. is a synonym of Cryptocoryne ciliata (Roxb.) Schott
- Ambrosina retrospiralis Roxb. is a synonym of Cryptocoryne retrospiralis (Roxb.) Kunth
- Ambrosina roxburghiana Voigt is a synonym of Cryptocoryne retrospiralis (Roxb.) Kunth
- Ambrosina spirialis (Retz.) Roxb. is a synonym of Cryptocoryne spiralis (Retz.) Fisch. ex Wydler
- Ambrosina unilocularis Roxb. is a synonym of Cryptocoryne retrospiralis (Roxb.) Kunth

== Ecology ==
=== Visitation of inflorescences ===
The inflorescences are visited by springtails, Embiidae, earwigs, mites of the genera Penthaleus or Bdella, and millipedes.

=== Seed dispersal ===
The seeds are attractive to ants, as the seed is coated in an edible elaiosome. Due to this edible coating, the ants disperse the seeds.

=== Parasite ecology ===
Ambrosina foliage may be affected by reddish-brown, 0–1 mm large leaf spots caused by the phytopatogenic fungus Entylomaster dietelianus (Bubák) Vánky & R.G. Shivas (syn. Entyloma dietelianum Bubák). Numerous 10–16 μm large spores are embedded within the leaf spots. This fungal disease is specific to the family Araceae.

== Etymology ==
The generic name Ambrosina honours the brothers Bartolomeo Ambrosini (1588–1657) and Giacinto Ambrosini (1605–1671).

== Conservation ==
Despite being listed as species of least concern by the IUCN Red List of Threatened Species, it is legally protected in France.
