= Philonotion =

Scientific classification
- Kingdom: Plantae
- Clade: Tracheophytes
- Clade: Angiosperms
- Clade: Monocots
- Order: Alismatales
- Family: Araceae
- Subfamily: Aroideae
- Tribe: Philonotieae; S.Y.Wong & P.C.Boyce
- Genus: Philonotion; Schott

Genus of flowering plants

Philonotion is a genus of plants in the family Araceae. It has three known species, native to tropical South America (Brazil, Bolivia, Peru, Colombia, Venezuela, the Guianas). Some authorities regard it as part of the related genus Schismatoglottis.

- Philonotion americanum (A.M.E.Jonker & Jonker) S.Y.Wong & P.C.Boyce - Brazil, Colombia, Venezuela, the Guianas
- Philonotion bolivaranum (G.S.Bunting & Steyerm.) S.Y.Wong & P.C.Boyce - Venezuela
- Philonotion spruceanum Schott - Venezuela, Colombia, Peru, Bolivia, northwestern Brazil
