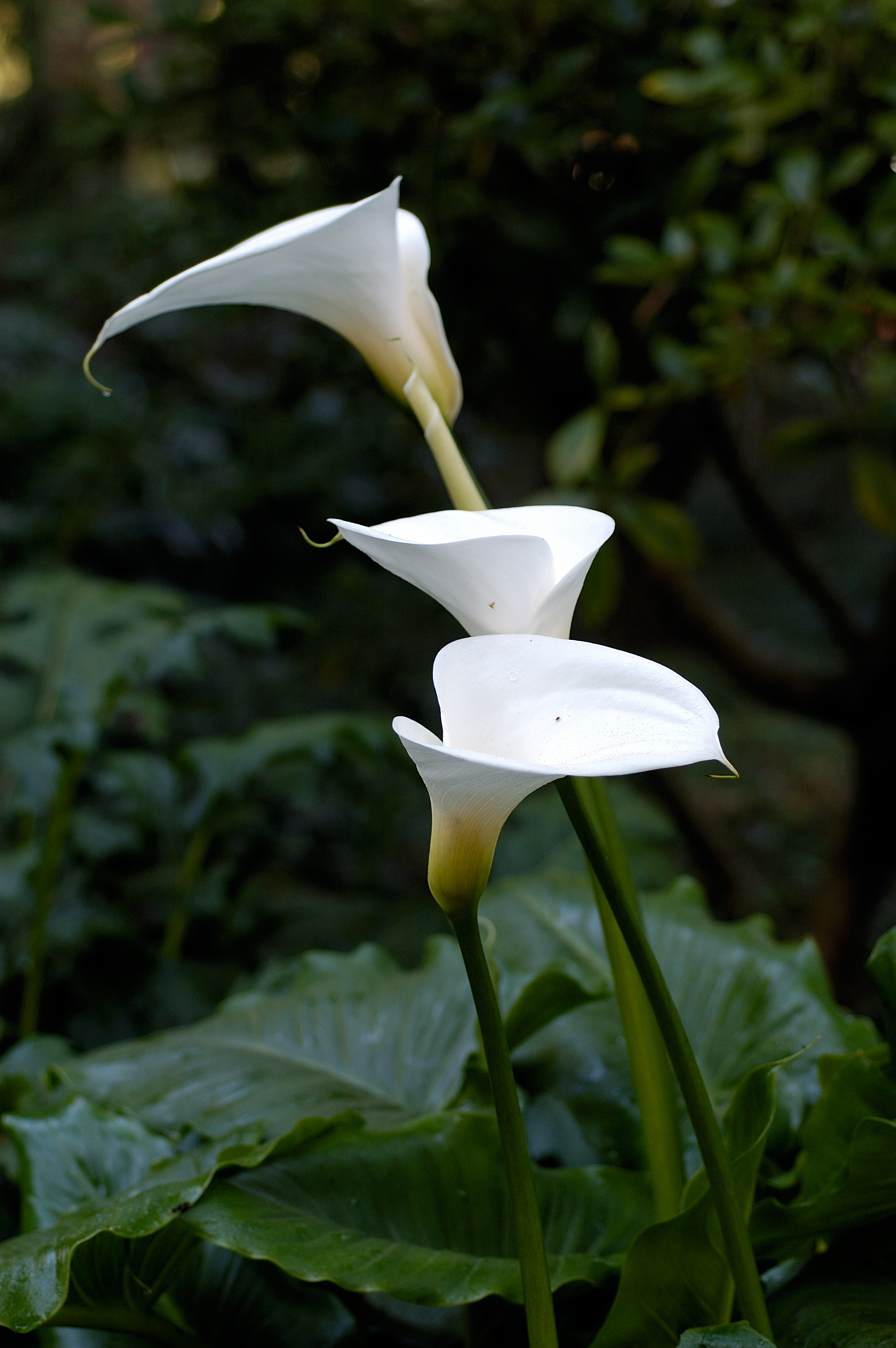
- Zantedeschia aethiopica

Scientific classification
- Kingdom: Plantae
- Clade: Tracheophytes
- Clade: Angiosperms
- Clade: Monocots
- Order: Alismatales
- Family: Araceae
- Subfamily: Aroideae

= Aroideae =

Subfamily of flowering plants

Aroideae is a subfamily of flowering plants in the family Araceae. It is the largest subfamily in Araceae and consists of about 72 genera, and 2,300 species. Many Aroideae have spiny pollen grains without a sporopollenin outer exine layer and lacking an aperture.

== Taxonomy ==
May be subdivided into a series of twenty-five tribes:

- Aglaonemateae Engler
- Ambrosineae Schott
- Anubiadeae Engler
- Areae Duby
- Arisaemateae Nakai
- Arisareae Dumortier
- Arophyteae A. Lemée ex Bogner
- Caladieae Schott
- Calleae Bartling
- Callopsideae Engler
- Colocasieae Brongniart
- Cryptocoryneae Wydler
- Culcasieae Engler
- Dieffenbachieae Schott
- Homalomeneae Schott
- Nephthytideae Engl.
- Peltandreae Engler
- Philodendreae Schott
- Philonotieae S.Y. Wong & P.C. Boyce
- Pistieae Lecoq & Juillet
- Schismatoglottideae Nakai
- Spathicarpeae Schott
- Stylochaetoneae
- Thomsonieae Blume
- Zantedeschieae Engler

=== Genera ===
It includes:

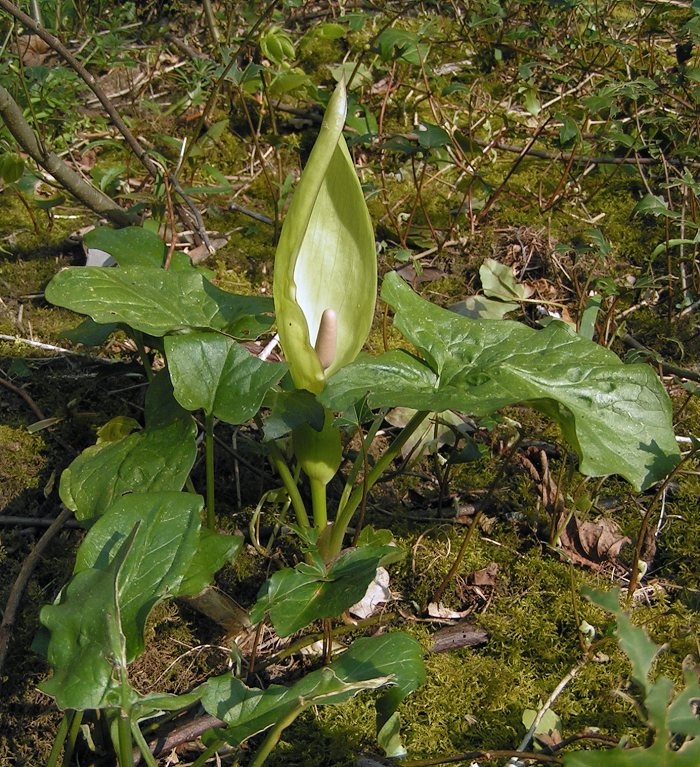
The cuckoo-pint or lords and ladies (Arum maculatum) is a common arum in British woodlands

- Aglaodorum Schott
- Aglaonema Schott
- Alocasia (Schott) G. Don
- Amorphophallus Blume ex Decne.
- Ambrosina Bassi
- Anchomanes Schott
- Anthurium André
- Anubias Schott
- Apoballis Schott
- Aridarum Ridl.
- Ariopsis Nimmo
- Arisaema Mart.
- Arisarum Mill.
- Arophyton Jum.
- Arum L.
- Asterostigma Fisch. & C. A. Mey.
- Bakoa P.C.Boyce & S.Y.Wong
- Bakoaella S.Y.Wong & P.C.Boyce
- Biarum Schott
- Bognera Mayo & Nicolson
- Bucephalandra Schott
- Caladium Vent.
- Calla L.
- Callopsis Engl.
- Carlephyton Jum.
- Cercestis Schott
- Chlorospatha Engl.
- Colletogyne Buchet
- Colocasia Schott
- Cryptocoryne Fisch. ex Wydler
- Culcasia P. Beauv.
- Dieffenbachia Schott
- Dracunculus Mill.
- Eminium (Blume) Schott
- Englerarum Nauheimer & P.C.Boyce
- Fenestratarum P.C.Boyce & S.Y.Wong
- Filarum Nicolson
- Furtadoa M. Hotta
- Gearum N. E. Br.
- Gorgonidium Schott
- Hapaline Schott
- Helicodiceros Schott
- Hestia P.C.Boyce & S.Y.Wong
- Heteroaridarum M. Hotta
- Homalomena Schott
- Hottarum Bogner & Nicolson
- Incarum E.G.Gonç
- Jasarum G. S. Bunting
- Lagenandra Dalzell
- Mangonia Schott
- Montrichardia Crueg.
- Nephthytis Schott
- Ooia P.C.Boyce & S.Y.Wong
- Peltandra Raf.
- Philodendron Schott
- Philonotion Schott
- Phymatarum M. Hotta
- Pinellia Ten.
- Piptospatha N. E. Br.
- Pistia L.
- Protarum Engl.
- Pseudodracontium N. E. Br.
- Pseudohydrosme Engl.
- Pursegloveia S.Y.Wong, S.L.Low & P.C.Boyce
- Remusatia Schott
- Sauromatum Schott
- Scaphispatha Brongn. ex Schott
- Schismatoglottis Zoll. & Moritzi
- Schottarum P.C.Boyce & S.Y.Wong
- Spathantheum Schott
- Spathicarpa Hook.
- Steudnera K. Koch
- Stylochaeton Lepr.
- Synandrospadix Engl.
- Syngonium Schott
- Taccarum Brongn. ex Schott
- Thaumatophyllum Schott
- Theriophonum Blume
- Typhonium Schott
- Typhonodorum Schott
- Ulearum Engl.
- Xanthosoma Schott
- Zantedeschia Spreng.
- Zomicarpa Schott
- Zomicarpella N. E. Br.

=== Monotypic genera within subtribes ===
- Ambrosina Bassi - A. bassii
- Calla L. - C. palustris (Bog arum)
- Callopsis Engl. - C. volkensii
- Pistia L. - P. stratiotes (Water lettuce)

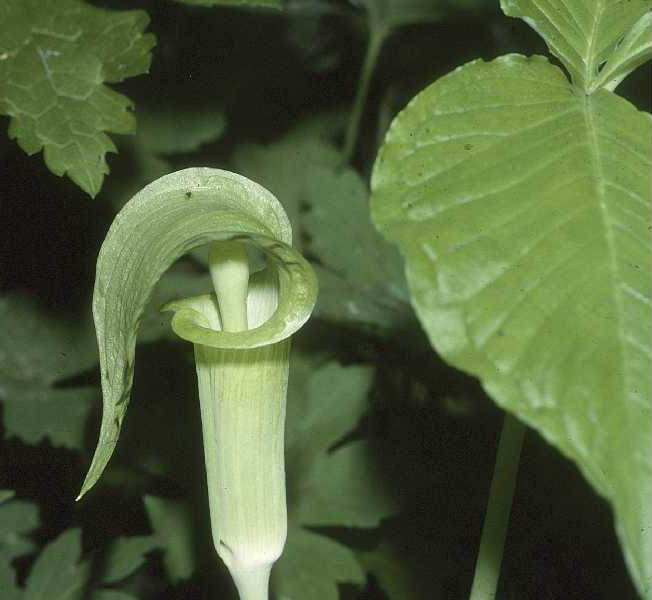
Arisaema triphyllum

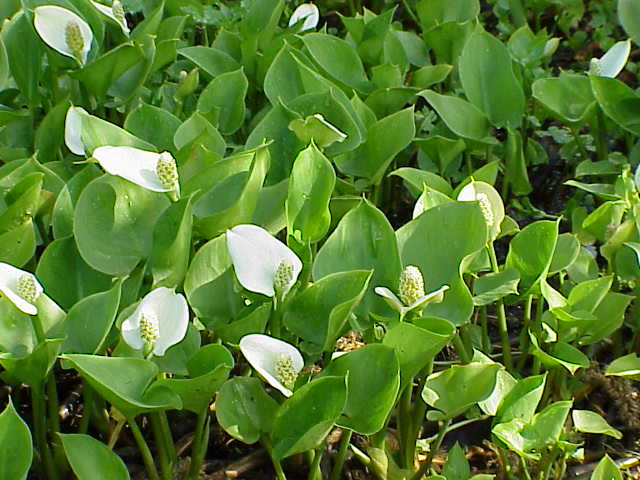
Calla palustris
