= Ooia =

Scientific classification
- Kingdom: Plantae
- Clade: Tracheophytes
- Clade: Angiosperms
- Clade: Monocots
- Order: Alismatales
- Family: Araceae
- Subfamily: Aroideae
- Tribe: Schismatoglottideae
- Genus: Ooia; S.Y.Wong & P.C.Boyce

Genus of flowering plants

Ooia is a genus of flowering plants in the family Araceae, formally described in 2010. It has two known species, both endemic to the island of Borneo.

- Ooia grabowskii (Engl.) S.Y.Wong & P.C.Boyce - Borneo (syn= Rhynchopyle grabowskii Engl., Piptospatha grabowskii (Engl.) Engl.)
- Ooia kinabaluensis (Bogner) S.Y.Wong & P.C.Boyce - Sabah, Brunei (syn= Hottarum kinabaluense Bogner, Piptospatha kinabaluensis (Bogner) Bogner & A.Hay)
