= Aridarum purseglovei =

Conservation status
- Least Concern (IUCN 3.1)

Scientific classification
- Kingdom: Plantae
- Clade: Tracheophytes
- Clade: Angiosperms
- Clade: Monocots
- Order: Alismatales
- Family: Araceae
- Genus: Aridarum
- Species: A. purseglovei

Binomial name
- Aridarum purseglovei (Furtado) M.Hotta

Synonyms
- Microcasia purseglovei Furtado

Species of flowering plant

Aridarum purseglovei is a species of aroid that is endemic to Sarawak in Malaysia. It can be found growing on wet, mossy rocks near rivers, or on river banks.
