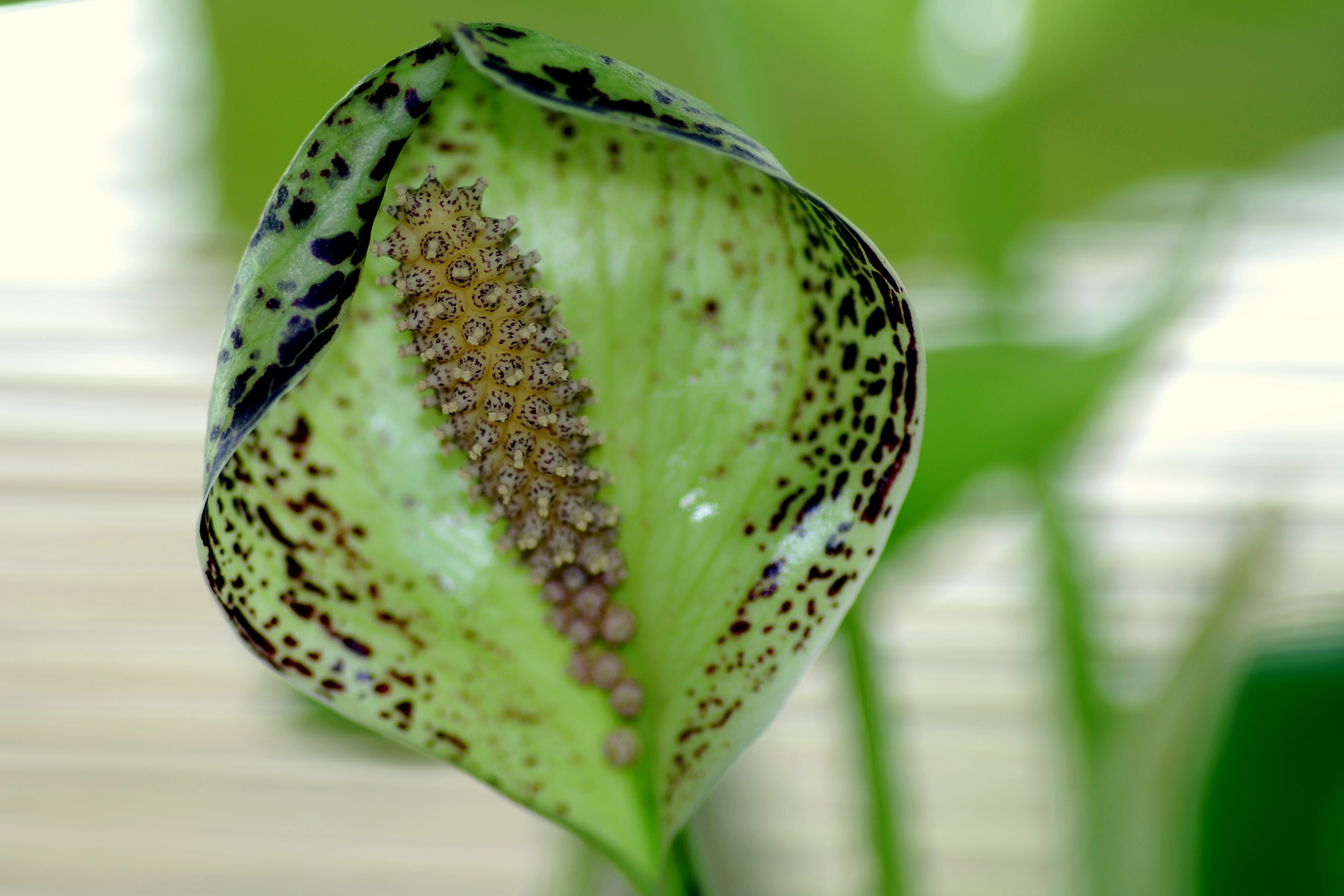
- Colletogyne perrieri inflorescence

Conservation status
- Vulnerable (IUCN 3.1)

Scientific classification
- Kingdom: Plantae
- Clade: Tracheophytes
- Clade: Angiosperms
- Clade: Monocots
- Order: Alismatales
- Family: Araceae
- Subfamily: Aroideae
- Tribe: Arophyteae
- Genus: Colletogyne; Buchet
- Species: C. perrieri

Binomial name
- Colletogyne perrieri Buchet

= Colletogyne =

Genus of flowering plants

Colletogyne is a monotypic genus of flowering plants in the family Araceae. The single species making up the genus is Colletogyne perrieri. Colletogyne is endemic to Montagne des Français region of northern Madagascar.

== Description ==
Colletogyne has heart shaped leaves and is tuberous. The spathe is white with purple spots and the spadix has red spots. Much like the other genera in Araceae found exclusively in Madagascar Colletogyne is believed to be one of the most advanced aroids with regards to its flowers and pollen structure.

== Range and habitat ==
Colletogyne is found only in the Montagne des Français protected area in the dry deciduous forests of northern Madagascar, where it grows in shrubland on limestone substrate between 100 and 300 meters elevation.

It has a small range, and is threatened with habitat loss from deforestation. Its conservation status is assessed as vulnerable.
