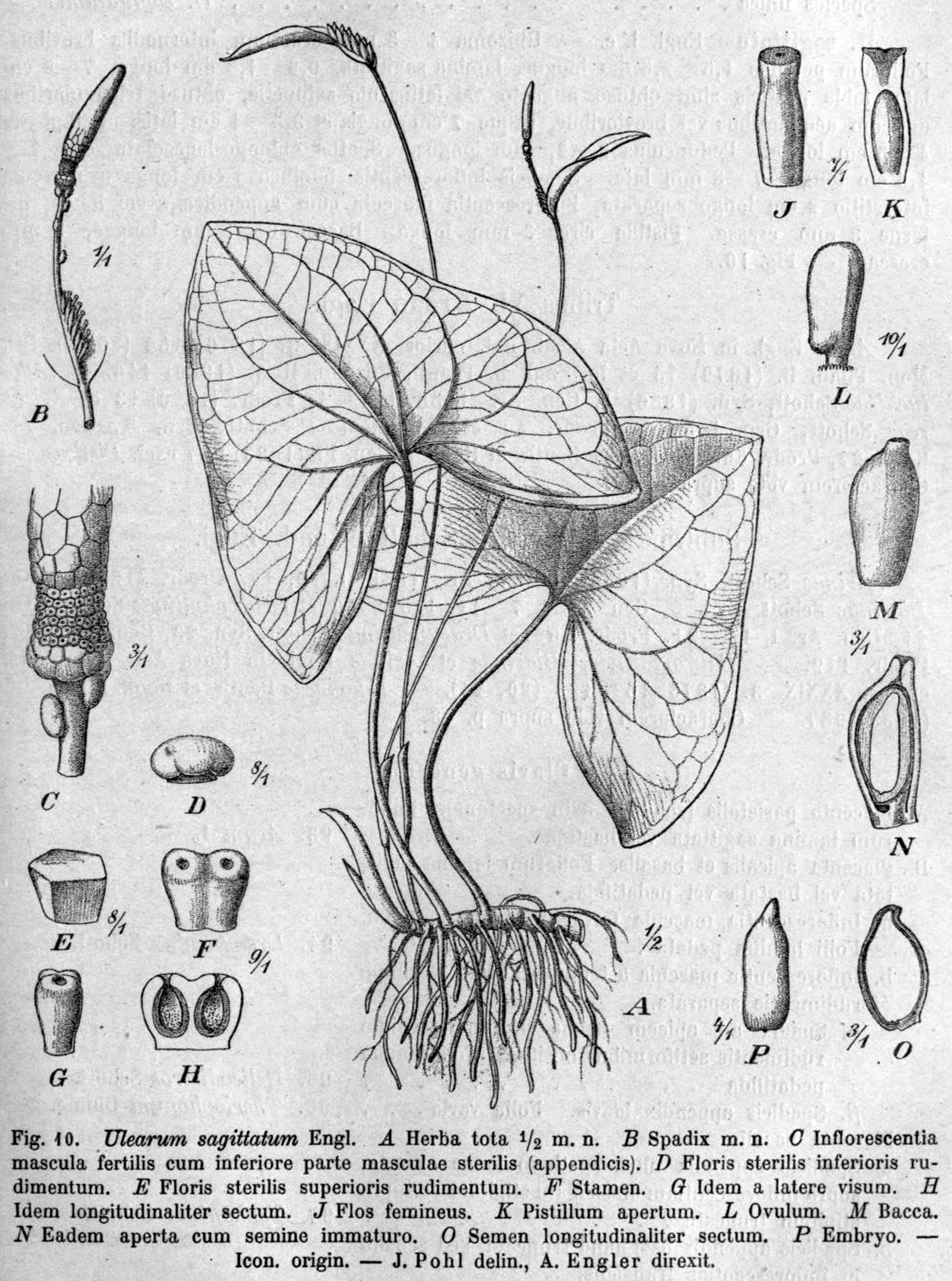
- Ulearum sagittatum botanical drawing from Das Pflanzenreich

Scientific classification
- Kingdom: Plantae
- Clade: Tracheophytes
- Clade: Angiosperms
- Clade: Monocots
- Order: Alismatales
- Family: Araceae
- Genus: Ulearum
- Species: U. sagittatum

Binomial name
- Ulearum sagittatum Engl.

= Ulearum sagittatum =

Species of flowering plant

Ulearum sagittatum is a species in the family Araceae. It is endemic to western Brazil and Peru, where it grows on the forest floor from small rhizomes. Its binomial name refers to the sagittate, meaning arrowhead-shaped, form of its leaves.
