= Pseudohydrosme ebo =

Conservation status
- Critically Endangered (IUCN 3.1)

Scientific classification
- Kingdom: Plantae
- Clade: Tracheophytes
- Clade: Angiosperms
- Clade: Monocots
- Order: Alismatales
- Family: Araceae
- Genus: Pseudohydrosme
- Species: P. ebo

Binomial name
- Pseudohydrosme ebo Cheek

Species of flowering plant

Pseudohydrosme ebo, commonly known as the Ebo false hydrosme, is a species of flowering plant in the family Araceae. It was described by Xander Van der Burgt in 2015 but was not officially classified as a true species in the genus Pseudohydrosme until 2018.

== Description ==
Pseudohydrosme ebo on average reaches about 30 cm (11.81 inches) tall. Spathe is 5 cm (1.96 inches) long, a dull white color, with brown stripes on the outer portion, and a light red-brown color with pale green veins on the inner portion. Leaves are 10 cm (3.93 inches) long, thick, oval shaped, and glossy.

== Distribution and habitat ==
Pseudohydrosme ebo is endemic to the Ebo Forest, Cameroon, at elevations of 300-400 m, where its range stretches only 1.3 km (0.80 miles) within a small valley. It is quite rare, with only 50-100 mature individuals recorded in the past years, but approximately 1,000 specimens have been recorded and collected previously.

== Conservation ==
Pseudohydrosme ebo is currently listed as "Critically Endangered" by the IUCN Red List, for excessive logging, slash-and-burn, and poaching are greatly affecting the species population.

== Poaching ==
Pseudohydrosme ebo is at a serious threat of poaching in its native habitat, with locals and wealthy collectors wanting to make a profit in the illegal plant trade and other major plant markets.
