= Bakoaella =

Scientific classification
- Kingdom: Plantae
- Clade: Tracheophytes
- Clade: Angiosperms
- Clade: Monocots
- Order: Alismatales
- Family: Araceae
- Tribe: Schismatoglottideae
- Genus: Bakoaella; S.Y.Wong & P.C.Boyce

Genus of flowering plants

Bakoaella is a genus of flowering plants belonging to the family Araceae.

Its native range is Borneo.

Species:

- Bakoaella nakamotoi (S.Y.Wong) S.W.Wong & P.C.Boyce
- Bakoaella sicula (S.Y.Wong) S.Y.Wong & P.C.Boyce
