= Carlephyton madagascariense =

Conservation status
- Endangered (IUCN 3.1)

Scientific classification
- Kingdom: Plantae
- Clade: Tracheophytes
- Clade: Angiosperms
- Clade: Monocots
- Order: Alismatales
- Family: Araceae
- Genus: Carlephyton
- Species: C. madagascariense

Binomial name
- Carlephyton madagascariense Jum.

Species of flowering plant

Carlephyton madagascariense is a plant species in the genus Carlephyton endemic to Madagascar.

== Description ==
The plant is herbaceous. It differs from the other two species in the genus in that it has some bisexual flowers in between the male and female zones of the spadix. The apex of the spadix can be either sterile or not.

== Range and habitat ==
Carlephyton madagascariense is native to the Ankarana area of northern Madagascar. It inhabits dry deciduous forest between 10 and 250 meters elevation. It typically grows in clusters.

The species is known from three locations. Its estimated extent of occurrence (EOO) is over 493 km^{2}, and its minimal estimated area of occupancy (AOO) is 16 km^{2}. Its conservation status is assessed as endangered. It is threatened with habitat loss from deforestation from livestock grazing and subsistence wood harvesting.
