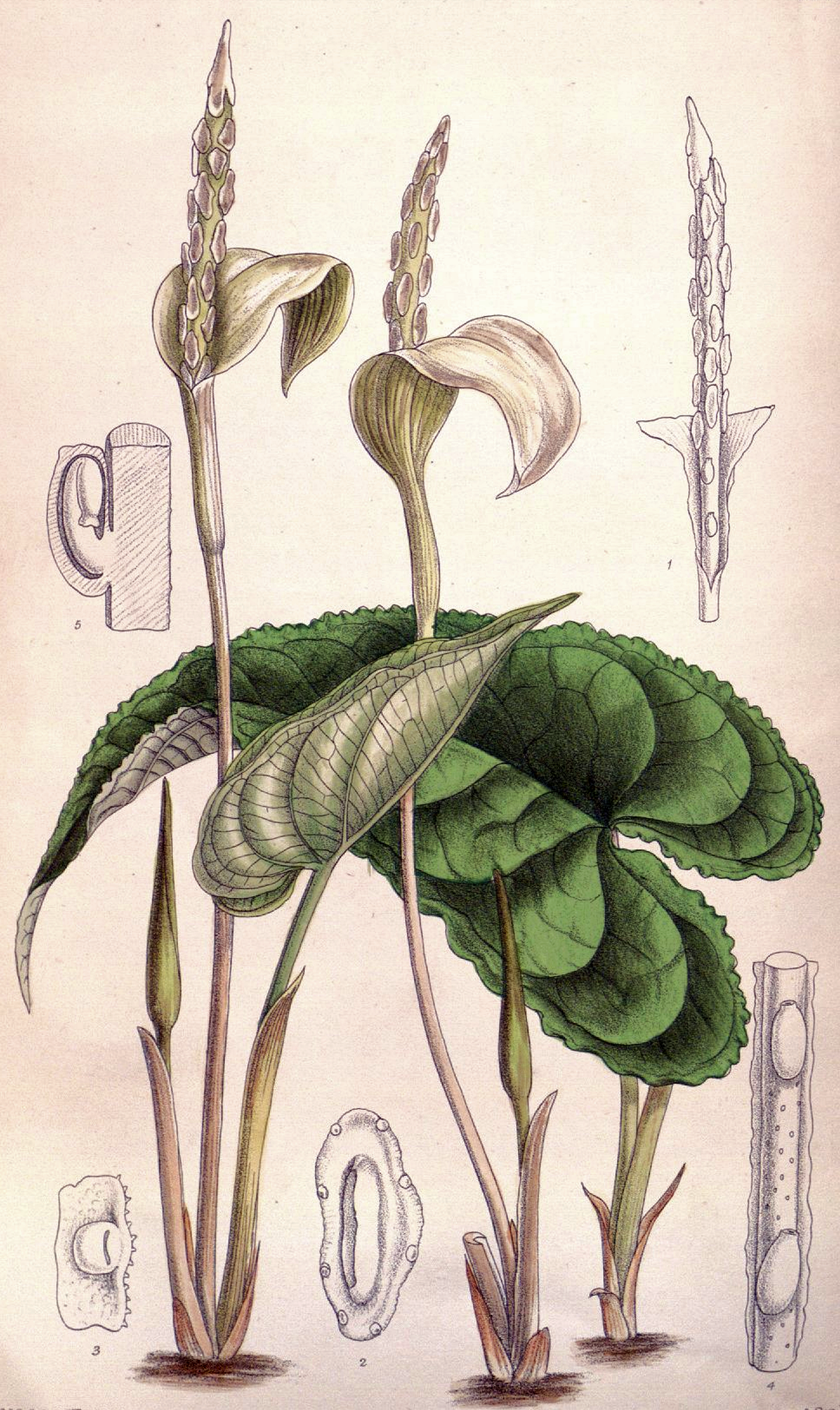
- Hapaline brownii

Scientific classification
- Kingdom: Plantae
- Clade: Tracheophytes
- Clade: Angiosperms
- Clade: Monocots
- Order: Alismatales
- Family: Araceae
- Subfamily: Aroideae
- Tribe: Caladieae
- Genus: Hapaline; Schott

Synonyms
- Hapale Schott

= Hapaline (plant) =

Genus of flowering plants

Hapaline is a genus of flowering plants in the family Araceae. It contains 7 species that are found from southern China to Borneo.

They are usually found growing in humid forests in pockets of humus amongst basalt or limestone rocks. The genus was originally given the name Hapale by Heinrich Wilhelm Schott in 1857, but it was changed to Hapaline a year later when it was discovered that a genus of South American marmosets already had been assigned the name in 1811. Hapaline is unique in that it is the only genus in the tribe Caladieae found in the Old World.

Species

- Hapaline appendiculata Ridl. - Sarawak
- Hapaline benthamiana Schott - Laos, Myanmar, Thailand, Vietnam
- Hapaline brownii Hook.f. - Thailand, Peninsular Malaysia
- Hapaline celatrix P.C.Boyce - Brunei, Sarawak
- Hapaline colaniae Gagnep. - Thailand, Vietnam
- Hapaline ellipticifolia C.Y.Wu & H.Li - Yunnan
- Hapaline kerrii Gagnep. - Thailand
- Hapaline locii V.D.Nguyen & Croat - Vietnam
