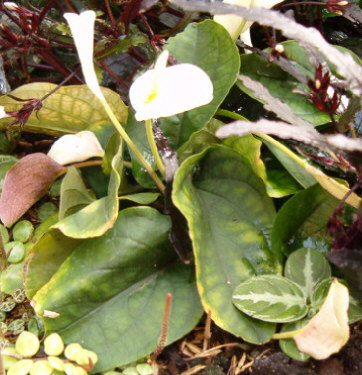

Conservation status
- Near Threatened (IUCN 3.1)

Scientific classification
- Kingdom: Plantae
- Clade: Tracheophytes
- Clade: Angiosperms
- Clade: Monocots
- Order: Alismatales
- Family: Araceae
- Subfamily: Aroideae
- Tribe: Callopsideae
- Genus: Callopsis; Engl.
- Species: C. volkensii

Binomial name
- Callopsis volkensii Engl.

= Callopsis =

Genus of flowering plants

Callopsis is a monotypic genus from the plant family Araceae and has only one species, Callopsis volkensii.

== Description ==
This plant forms a creeping rhizome and has cordate-ovate leaves that are medium green and glabrous. The inflorescence is typical of the family Araceae, with a white spathe and yellow spadix. The spadix is shorter than the spathe and its male and female flowers are separated shortly.

== Distribution and habitat ==
It grows at an altitude of 800 m (2,625 ft) in virgin forest in parts of eastern Africa (Kenya and Tanzania). There have been reports of the species in Cameroon, but these remain unconfirmed.
