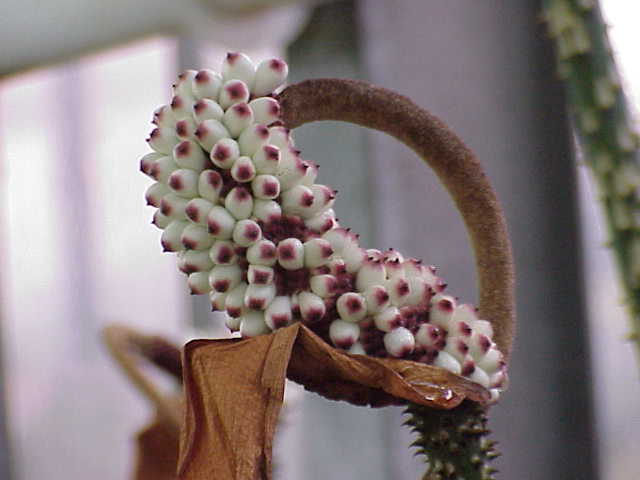
- Anchomanes giganteus

Scientific classification
- Kingdom: Plantae
- Clade: Tracheophytes
- Clade: Angiosperms
- Clade: Monocots
- Order: Alismatales
- Family: Araceae
- Subfamily: Aroideae
- Tribe: Nephthytideae
- Genus: Anchomanes; Schott

= Anchomanes =

Genus of flowering plants

Anchomanes is a genus of flowering plants in the family Araceae. The genus is native to tropical Africa.

Anchomanes is quite similar to species in the genera Dracontium and Amorphophallus, but there are a few apparent differences. One such difference is that the roots are perennial. Also, the stalks are spiny and the tuberous rhizomes have eyes.

== Species ==
- Anchomanes abbreviatus Engl. - Kenya, Tanzania, Mozambique
- Anchomanes boehmii Engl. - Kigoma region of western Tanzania
- Anchomanes dalzielii N.E.Br. - Benin, Ghana, Ivory Coast, Nigeria, Cameroon, Sudan, Zambia, Zimbabwe
- Anchomanes difformis (Blume) Engl. - much of tropical Africa from Liberia to Tanzania, south to Angola and Zambia
- Anchomanes giganteus Engl. - Gabon, Congo-Brazzaville, Zaire, Burundi
- Anchomanes nigritianus Rendle - Gabon, Nigeria
