= List of Homalomena species =

Homalomena is a genus of plants in the family Araceae. As of September 2024, Plants of the World Online accepted about 160 species.

== A ==
- Homalomena acuminata (Ridl.) S.Y.Wong & P.C.Boyce
- Homalomena adiensis A.Hay
- Homalomena aeneifolia Alderw.
- Homalomena agens Kurniawan & P.C.Boyce
- Homalomena anthurioides S.Y.Wong, P.C.Boyce & A.Hay
- Homalomena ardua P.C.Boyce & S.Y.Wong
- Homalomena argentea Ridl.
- Homalomena aromatica (Spreng.) Schott
- Homalomena asmae Baharuddin & P.C.Boyce
- Homalomena asperifolia Alderw.
- Homalomena atlas S.Y.Wong & P.C.Boyce
- Homalomena atroviridis Engl. & K.Krause
- Homalomena atrox P.C.Boyce, S.Y.Wong & Fasih.

== B ==
- Homalomena baangongensis L.S.Tung & Y.C.Hoe
- Homalomena batoeensis Engl.
- Homalomena bellula Schott
- Homalomena benedikii S.Y.Wong & P.C.Boyce
- Homalomena bengohensis S.Y.Wong & P.C.Boyce
- Homalomena borneensis Ridl.
- Homalomena burkilliana Ridl.

== C ==
- Homalomena caput-gorgonis S.Y.Wong & P.C.Boyce
- Homalomena cataractae S.Y.Wong & P.C.Boyce
- Homalomena clandestina P.C.Boyce, S.Y.Wong & Fasih.
- Homalomena confusa Furtado
- Homalomena consobrina (Schott) Engl.
- Homalomena cordata Schott
- Homalomena corneri Furtado
- Homalomena cowleyae P.C.Boyce & S.Y.Wong
- Homalomena cristata Alderw.
- Homalomena curtisii Ridl.
- Homalomena curvata Engl.

== D ==
- Homalomena davidiana A.Hay
- Homalomena debilicrista Y.C.Hoe
- Homalomena distans Ridl.
- Homalomena doctersii Alderw.

== E ==
- Homalomena electra P.C.Boyce & S.Y.Wong
- Homalomena elegans Engl.
- Homalomena elegantula A.Hay & Hersc.
- Homalomena expedita A.Hay & Hersc.

== G ==
- Homalomena gadutensis M.Hotta
- Homalomena galbana Baharuddin & P.C.Boyce
- Homalomena gastrofructa Y.C.Hoe, S.Y.Wong & P.C.Boyce
- Homalomena gaudichaudii Schott
- Homalomena gempal Kartini, P.C.Boyce & S.Y.Wong
- Homalomena giamensis L.S.Tung, S.Y.Wong & P.C.Boyce
- Homalomena gillii Furtado
- Homalomena griffithii (Schott) Hook.f.

== H ==
- Homalomena hainanensis H.Li
- Homalomena hanneae P.C.Boyce, S.Y.Wong & Fasih.
- Homalomena hasei P.C.Boyce & S.Y.Wong
- Homalomena hastata M.Hotta
- Homalomena havilandii Ridl.
- Homalomena hendersonii Furtado
- Homalomena hooglandii A.Hay
- Homalomena hottae S.Y.Wong, S.K.Chai & P.C.Boyce
- Homalomena humilis (Jack) Hook.f.
- Homalomena hypsiantha P.C.Boyce & S.Y.Wong

== I ==
- Homalomena ibanorum S.Y.Wong & P.C.Boyce
- Homalomena imitator P.C.Boyce & S.Y.Wong
- Homalomena impudica Hersc. & A.Hay
- Homalomena insignis N.E.Br.

== J ==
- Homalomena jacobsiana A.Hay
- Homalomena joanneae S.Y.Wong & P.C.Boyce
- Homalomena josefii P.C.Boyce & S.Y.Wong

== K ==
- Homalomena kalkmanii A.Hay
- Homalomena kelungensis Hayata
- Homalomena kiahii Furtado
- Homalomena kionsomensis Kartini, P.C.Boyce & S.Y.Wong
- Homalomena korthalsii Furtado
- Homalomena kualakohensis Zulhazman, P.C.Boyce & Mashhor

== L ==
- Homalomena lambirensis S.Y.Wong & P.C.Boyce
- Homalomena lancea Ridl.
- Homalomena lancifolia Hook.f.
- Homalomena latifrons Engl.
- Homalomena latisinus S.Y.Wong & P.C.Boyce
- Homalomena lauterbachii Engl.
- Homalomena limnogena P.C.Boyce & S.Y.Wong
- Homalomena lindenii (Rodigas) Ridl.
- Homalomena lingua-felis A.S.D.Irsyam, Raynalta & M.R.Hariri
- Homalomena longipes Merr.

== M ==
- Homalomena magna A.Hay
- Homalomena major Griff.
- Homalomena marasmiella Kartini, P.C.Boyce & S.Y.Wong
- Homalomena matangae Y.C.Hoe, S.Y.Wong & P.C.Boyce
- Homalomena megalophylla M.Hotta
- Homalomena melanesica A.Hay
- Homalomena metallica (N.E.Br.) Engl.
- Homalomena minor Griff.
- Homalomena minutissima M.Hotta
- Homalomena mobula P.C.Boyce & S.Y.Wong
- Homalomena monandra M.Hotta
- Homalomena montana Furtado
- Homalomena mutans P.C.Boyce & S.Y.Wong

== N ==
- Homalomena nathanielii S.Y.Wong & P.C.Boyce
- Homalomena niahensis P.C.Boyce
- Homalomena nigrescens (Schott) Engl.
- Homalomena nutans Hook.f.

== O ==
- Homalomena obovata Ridl.
- Homalomena obscurifolia Alderw.
- Homalomena occulta (Lour.) Schott
- Homalomena ovalifolia (Schott) Ridl.
- Homalomena ovata Engl.

== P ==
- Homalomena padangensis M.Hotta
- Homalomena palawanensis Engl.
- Homalomena passa S.Y.Wong & P.C.Boyce
- Homalomena peekelii Engl.
- Homalomena pendula (Blume) Bakh.f.
- Homalomena perplexa K.Z.Hein, Vuong, Bao & V.S.Dang
- Homalomena pexa S.Y.Wong, P.C.Boyce & A.Hay
- Homalomena philippinensis Engl.
- Homalomena pineodora Sulaiman & P.C.Boyce
- Homalomena plicata P.C.Boyce & S.Y.Wong
- Homalomena pontederifolia Griff. ex Hook.f.
- Homalomena portae-inferni S.Y.Wong, Joling & P.C.Boyce
- Homalomena producta A.Hay
- Homalomena prolixa S.Y.Wong & P.C.Boyce
- Homalomena pseudogeniculata P.C.Boyce & S.Y.Wong
- Homalomena pulleana Engl. & K.Krause
- Homalomena puncticulosa S.Y.Wong & P.C.Boyce
- Homalomena punctulata Engl.
- Homalomena pyrospatha Bogner

== R ==
- Homalomena ridleyi S.Y.Wong & P.C.Boyce
- Homalomena robusta Engl. & K.Krause
- Homalomena rostrata Griff.
- Homalomena rubescens (Roxb.) Kunth
- Homalomena rusdii M.Hotta

== S ==
- Homalomena santubongensis S.Y.Wong & P.C.Boyce
- Homalomena sarawakensis Ridl.
- Homalomena saxorum (Schott) Engl.
- Homalomena schlechteri Engl.
- Homalomena scortechinii Hook.f.
- Homalomena scutata S.Y.Wong & P.C.Boyce
- Homalomena selaburensis P.C.Boyce & S.Y.Wong
- Homalomena sengkenyang P.C.Boyce, S.Y.Wong & Fasih.
- Homalomena silvatica Alderw.
- Homalomena simunii Kartini, P.C.Boyce & S.Y.Wong
- Homalomena singaporensis Regel
- Homalomena soniae A.Hay
- Homalomena squamis-draconis S.Y.Wong & P.C.Boyce
- Homalomena steenisiana A.Hay
- Homalomena stella P.C.Boyce & S.Y.Wong
- Homalomena stollei Engl. & K.Krause
- Homalomena stongensis Zulhazman, P.C.Boyce & Mashhor
- Homalomena striatieopetiolata P.C.Boyce & S.Y.Wong
- Homalomena subcordata Engl.
- Homalomena subemarginata Alderw.
- Homalomena succincta S.Y.Wong & P.C.Boyce
- Homalomena symplocarpifolia P.C.Boyce, S.Y.Wong & Fasih.

== T ==
- Homalomena tenuispadix Engl.
- Homalomena terajaensis S.Y.Wong & P.C.Boyce
- Homalomena tirtae Asih, Kurniawan & P.C.Boyce
- Homalomena tonkinensis Engl.
- Homalomena treubii Engl.
- Homalomena truncata (Schott) Hook.f.

== V ==
- Homalomena vagans P.C.Boyce
- Homalomena velutipedunculata Y.C.Hoe, S.Y.Wong & P.C.Boyce
- Homalomena vietnamensis Bogner & V.D.Nguyen
- Homalomena vittifolia Kurniawan & P.C.Boyce
- Homalomena vivens P.C.Boyce, S.Y.Wong & Fasih.

== W ==
- Homalomena wallichii Schott
- Homalomena wongii S.Y.Wong & P.C.Boyce

== Z ==
- Homalomena zollingeri Schott
