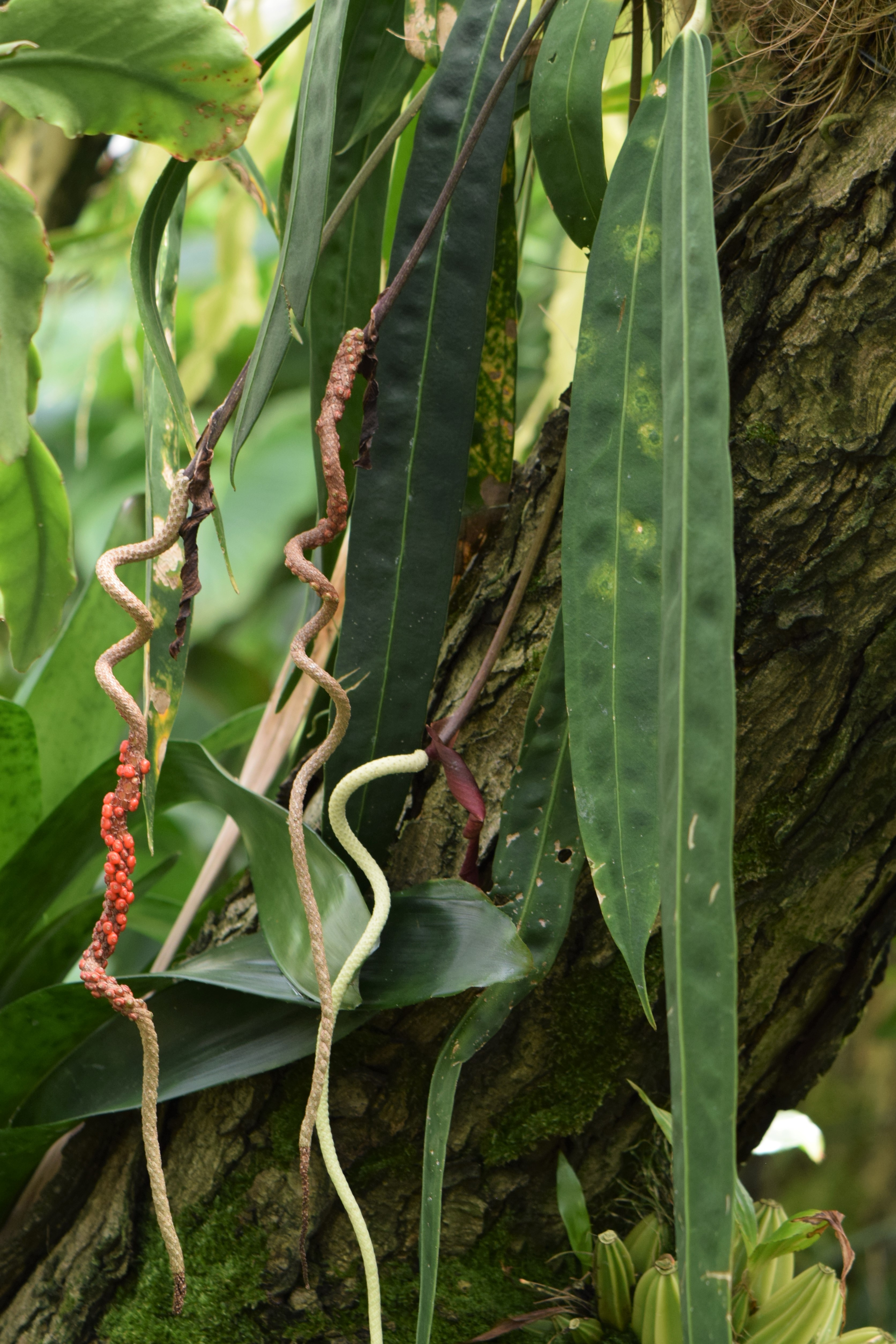
- A. wendlingeri, Berlin Botanical Garden; note the pollinated inflorescence developing into berries (seed pods).

Scientific classification
- Kingdom: Plantae
- Clade: Tracheophytes
- Clade: Angiosperms
- Clade: Monocots
- Order: Alismatales
- Family: Araceae
- Genus: Anthurium
- Species: A. wendlingeri

Binomial name
- Anthurium wendlingeri G.M.Barroso

= Anthurium wendlingeri =

Species of plant

Anthurium wendlingeri is a species of aroid plant, in the genus Anthurium, found from Central to South America, from SE Nicaragua to NW Colombia. It grows in moist, montane tropical habitats as an epiphyte. Unique among its genus, A. wendlingeri has long, pendant and strap-like leaves (which grow up to 7 feet (2.1 m) long), and can have a slightly velvety appearance.

A member of the section Porphyrochitonium, colloquially called "strap-leaved" Anthuriums, A. wendlingeri is visually similar to A. vittariifolium or A. pendens, albeit with more spiraling, corkscrew-like spadix. Like many Anthurium, the species is somewhat variable and has some local variety within its range; the varietal horichii, described by Croat, is found in Costa Rica. The more common subspecies is A. w. wendlingeri, found across the majority of the species' range.
