= Philodendron squamicaule =

Scientific classification
- Kingdom: Plantae
- Clade: Tracheophytes
- Clade: Angiosperms
- Clade: Monocots
- Order: Alismatales
- Family: Araceae
- Genus: Philodendron
- Species: P. squamicaule

Binomial name
- Philodendron squamicaule Croat & Grayum

Species of plant

Philodendron squamicaule is a species of flowering plant in the family Araceae. It is native to southeastern Nicaragua, Costa Rica, Panama, Colombia, and Ecuador. A hemiepiphyte, its purplish petioles are densely scaly, with the scales fading to a brownish-red color reminiscent of dried blood.
