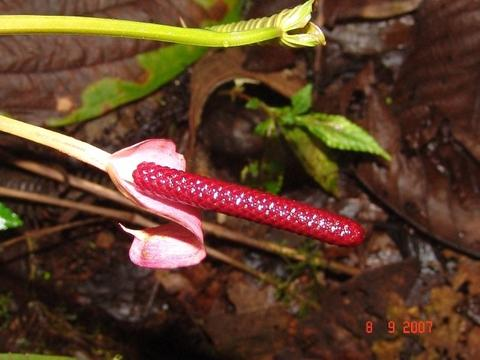
- Inflorescence

Scientific classification
- Kingdom: Plantae
- Clade: Embryophytes
- Clade: Tracheophytes
- Clade: Angiosperms
- Clade: Monocots
- Order: Alismatales
- Family: Araceae
- Genus: Anthurium
- Species: A. alluriquinense

Binomial name
- Anthurium alluriquinense Croat

= Anthurium alluriquinense =

Species of flowering plant

Anthurium alluriquinense is a species of flowering plant in the family Araceae, native to Colombia and Ecuador. It is most similar to A. longicaudatum.
