= Payaw =

Payaw may refer to:

- Cyrtosperma merkusii, a taro plant grown in the Philippines
- Homalomena philippinensis, an ornamental plant native to the Philippines and Orchid Island
- Payaw, a town in Lahe Township, Myanmar
