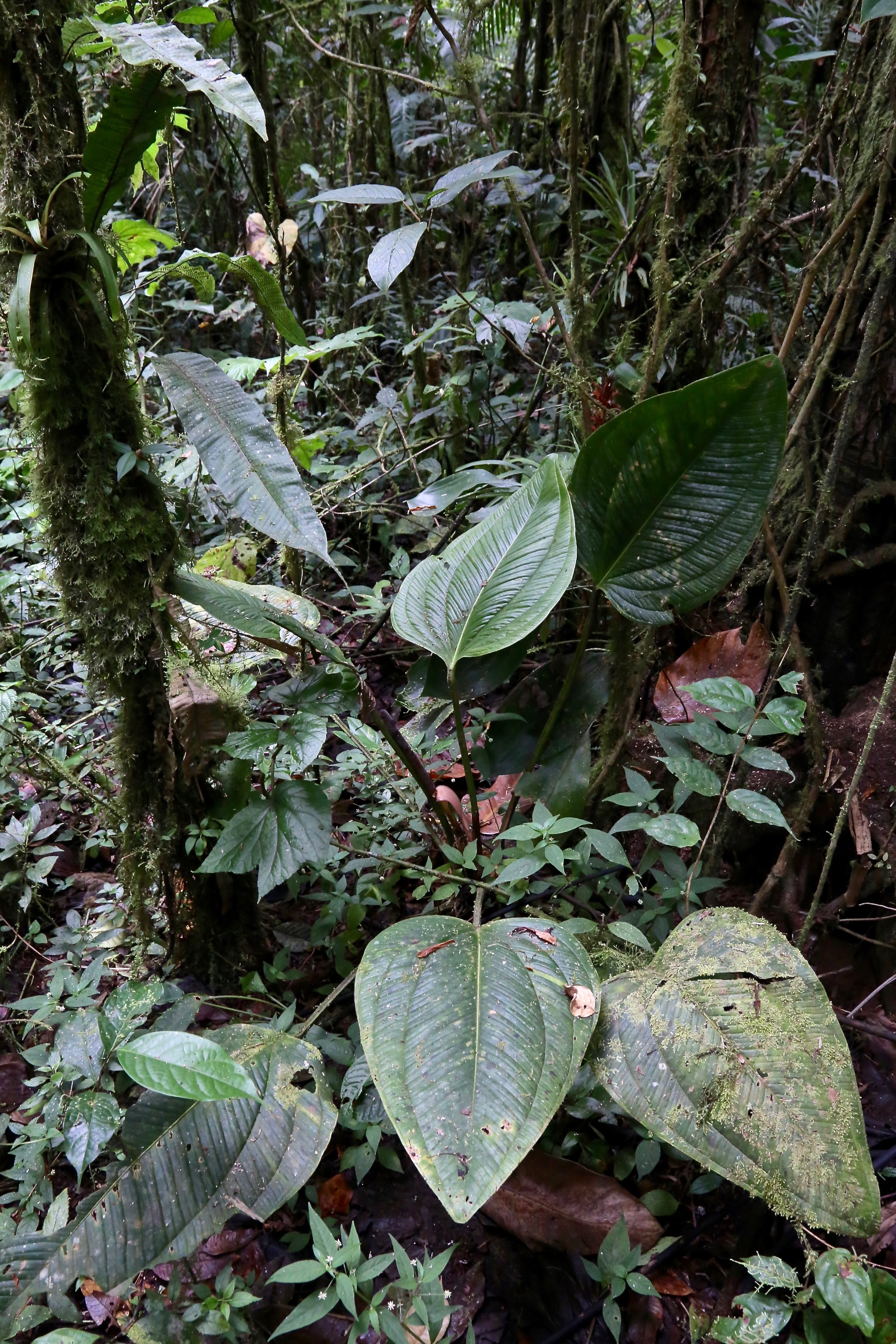
- Anthurium ovatifolium in Ecuador

Scientific classification
- Kingdom: Plantae
- Clade: Tracheophytes
- Clade: Angiosperms
- Clade: Monocots
- Order: Alismatales
- Family: Araceae
- Genus: Anthurium
- Species: A. ovatifolium

Binomial name
- Anthurium ovatifolium Engl.

= Anthurium ovatifolium =

Species of plant

Anthurium ovatifolium is a species of plant in the genus Anthurium native to Colombia, Ecuador, and Peru. It grows in wet tropical habitats, and is a member of the section Digitinervium. Its species name refers to the oval shape of its leaves, and it can be distinguished from similar species like Anthurium lentii by its red berries.
