= Philodendron guianense =

Conservation status
- Least Concern (IUCN 3.1)

Scientific classification
- Kingdom: Plantae
- Clade: Tracheophytes
- Clade: Angiosperms
- Clade: Monocots
- Order: Alismatales
- Family: Araceae
- Genus: Philodendron
- Species: P. guianense

Binomial name
- Philodendron guianense Croat & Grayum

Species of plant

Philodendron guianense is a species of flowering plant in the family Araceae. It is native to the Guianas and northern Brazil. A climber, it is typically found in wet tropical forests at elevations from 5 m (16 ft) to 900 m (3,000 ft) above sea level. It is assessed as Least Concern.
