= Adelonema pallidinervium =

Scientific classification
- Kingdom: Plantae
- Clade: Tracheophytes
- Clade: Angiosperms
- Clade: Monocots
- Order: Alismatales
- Family: Araceae
- Genus: Adelonema
- Species: A. pallidinervium

Binomial name
- Adelonema pallidinervium Croat

Species of plant

Adelonema pallidinervium, the pale-veined adelonema, is a species of flowering plant in the family Araceae. It is native to Ecuador. A subshrub, it is typically found in humid tropical rainforests at elevations from 500 to 1,000 m (1,600 to 3,300 ft). It is infrequently available from specialty suppliers and is valued for its ornamental foliage.
