= Philodendron campii =

Scientific classification
- Kingdom: Plantae
- Clade: Tracheophytes
- Clade: Angiosperms
- Clade: Monocots
- Order: Alismatales
- Family: Araceae
- Genus: Philodendron
- Species: P. campii

Binomial name
- Philodendron campii Croat

Species of plant

Philodendron campii is a species of flowering plant in the family Araceae, native to Colombia, Ecuador, and Peru, and to adjoining parts of Brazil. It is found in wet tropical forests, and it is available from commercial growers as a houseplant.
