= Anthurium sect. Digitinervium =

Scientific classification
- Kingdom: Plantae
- Clade: Tracheophytes
- Clade: Angiosperms
- Clade: Monocots
- Order: Alismatales
- Family: Araceae
- Genus: Anthurium
- Section: Anthurium sect. Digitinervium

Species
- See text

Group of flowering plants

Digitinervium is a section of the genus Anthurium. It is a small, natural section (meaning that the plants within it share definite characteristics, rather than the group being defined by the odd characteristic of one type specimen, as in sect. Gymnopodium) consisting of plants with thick leaf blades, glandular-punctate (having raised dots) on the lower surfaces, with well-defined basal veins, normally occurring in pairs and extending past the middle of the blade. Tertiary veins are fine, closely packed, and parallel. The section is distributed across a limited range consisting of the Andes of northwestern South America (i.e. Colombia and Ecuador), and the mountains of Costa Rica and Panama.

The most typical specimen of this section is Anthurium ovatifolium; other examples include A. lentii, A. crassifolium, A.lingua and A. weberbaueri. Very little is known about hybridization in this section; the only known cross was of A. lentii with A. nymphiifolium, of section Calomystrium.
