= Philodendron brunneicaule =

Scientific classification
- Kingdom: Plantae
- Clade: Tracheophytes
- Clade: Angiosperms
- Clade: Monocots
- Order: Alismatales
- Family: Araceae
- Genus: Philodendron
- Species: P. brunneicaule

Binomial name
- Philodendron brunneicaule Croat & Grayum

Species of plant

Philodendron brunneicaule is a species of flowering plant in the family Araceae. It is native to Costa Rica, Panama, Colombia, and Ecuador. A climber with unusual brown stems, it is typically found in the rainforest understory.
