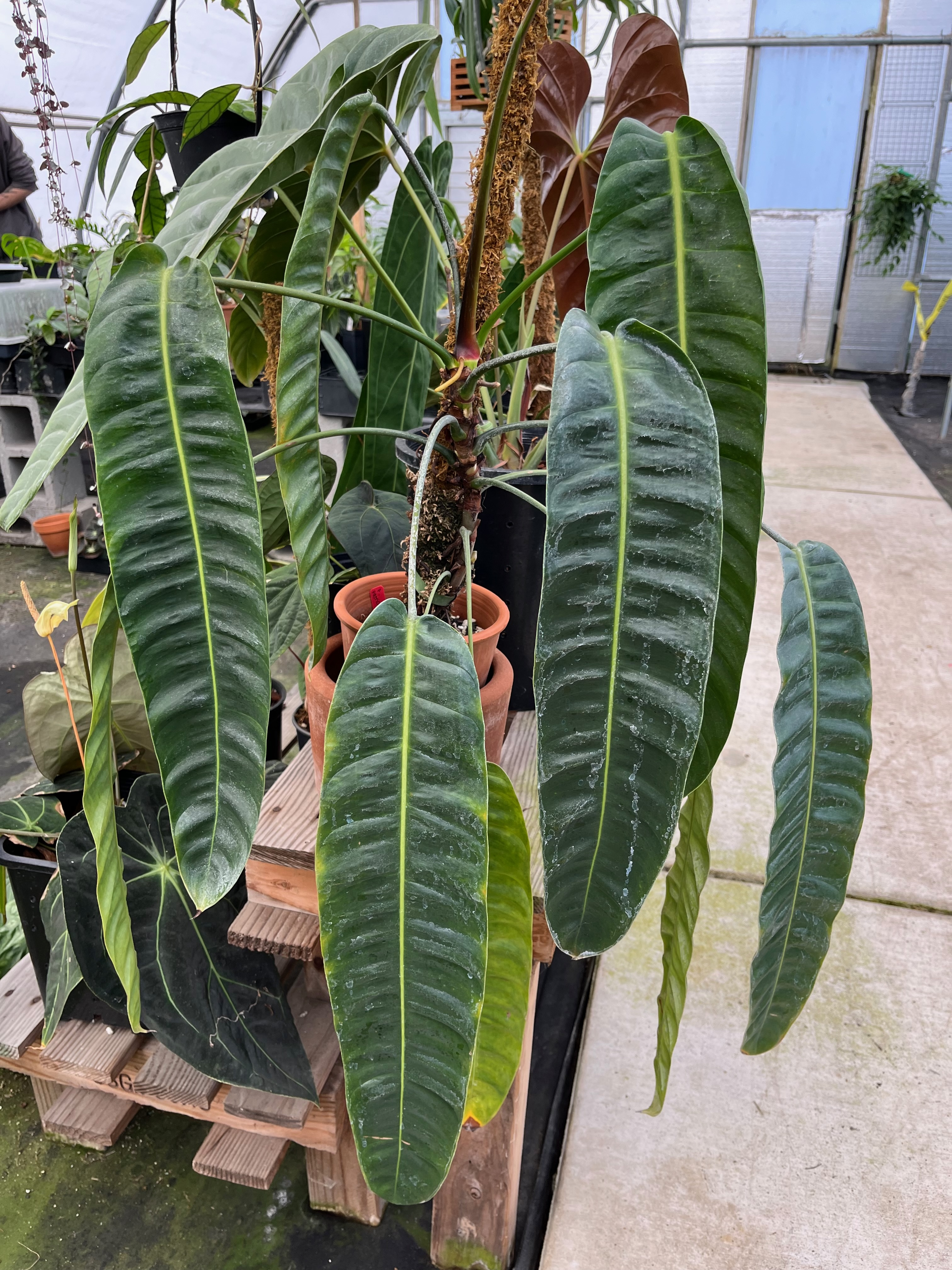
- P. patriciae being grown in a greenhouse

Scientific classification
- Kingdom: Plantae
- Clade: Tracheophytes
- Clade: Angiosperms
- Clade: Monocots
- Order: Alismatales
- Family: Araceae
- Genus: Philodendron
- Species: P. patriciae

Binomial name
- Philodendron patriciae Croat

= Philodendron patriciae =

Species of plant

Philodendron patriciae is a plant in the genus Philodendron native to the Chocó region of Colombia. It was scientifically described in 2010 by Thomas Croat, who named it after his wife Patricia and called it "one of the most spectacular species of Philodendron that he had ever seen". An hemi-epiphyte, as it climbs the long, ovate-lanceolate leaves hang down and develop ruffles. The ovules of the plant are set up axially and number up to at least 10 per locule. It is also characterized by its short stems and pendent narrow blades, which are matte and become undulated in age.

== See also ==
- List of Philodendron species
