= Ibania =

Scientific classification
- Kingdom: Plantae
- Clade: Tracheophytes
- Clade: Angiosperms
- Clade: Monocots
- Order: Alismatales
- Family: Araceae
- Subfamily: Aroideae
- Tribe: Schismatoglottideae
- Genus: Ibania; S.Y.Wong & P.C.Boyce

Genus of flowering plants

Ibania is a genus of flowering plants in the arum family, Araceae. It includes 12 species endemic to Borneo.

The genus was described by Sin Yeng Wong and Peter Charles Boyce in 2024, and includes species formerly placed in Schismatoglottis.

== Species ==
12 species are accepted.

- Ibania belonis (S.Y.Wong, Aisahtul & P.C.Boyce) S.Y.Wong & P.C.Boyce
- Ibania fossae (S.Y.Wong, P.C.Boyce & Aisahtul) S.Y.Wong & P.C.Boyce
- Ibania gaesa (S.Y.Wong, Aisahtul & P.C.Boyce) S.Y.Wong & P.C.Boyce
- Ibania gangsai (S.Y.Wong, Aisahtul & P.C.Boyce) S.Y.Wong & P.C.Boyce
- Ibania gephyra (P.C.Boyce) S.Y.Wong & P.C.Boyce
- Ibania imbakensis (Kartini, S.Y.Wong & P.C.Boyce) S.Y.Wong & P.C.Boyce
- Ibania patentinervia (Engl.) S.Y.Wong & P.C.Boyce
- Ibania pectinervia (A.Hay) S.Y.Wong & P.C.Boyce
- Ibania pichinensis (P.C.Boyce) S.Y.Wong & P.C.Boyce
- Ibania puncakborneensis (P.C.Boyce) S.Y.Wong & P.C.Boyce
- Ibania retinervia (Furtado) S.Y.Wong & P.C.Boyce
- Ibania smaragdina (S.Y.Wong, Aisahtul & P.C.Boyce) S.Y.Wong & P.C.Boyce
