= Adelonema crinipes =

Scientific classification
- Kingdom: Plantae
- Clade: Tracheophytes
- Clade: Angiosperms
- Clade: Monocots
- Order: Alismatales
- Family: Araceae
- Genus: Adelonema
- Species: A. crinipes

Binomial name
- Adelonema crinipes (Engl.) S.Y.Wong & Croat

Species of flowering plant

Adelonema crinipes is a species of aroid plant belonging to the Philodendron clade. This species was previously classified under the genus Philodendron, but taxonomic revisions have led to its reclassification into the distinct genus Adelonema.

== Description ==
Adelonema crinipes is native to the Neotropical region, with a distribution in western South America and northern Brazil. It is a hemiepiphytic plant, meaning it can grow both on the ground and on other plants, such as trees. The plant has distinctive large, deeply lobed leaves and a unique inflorescence structure.
