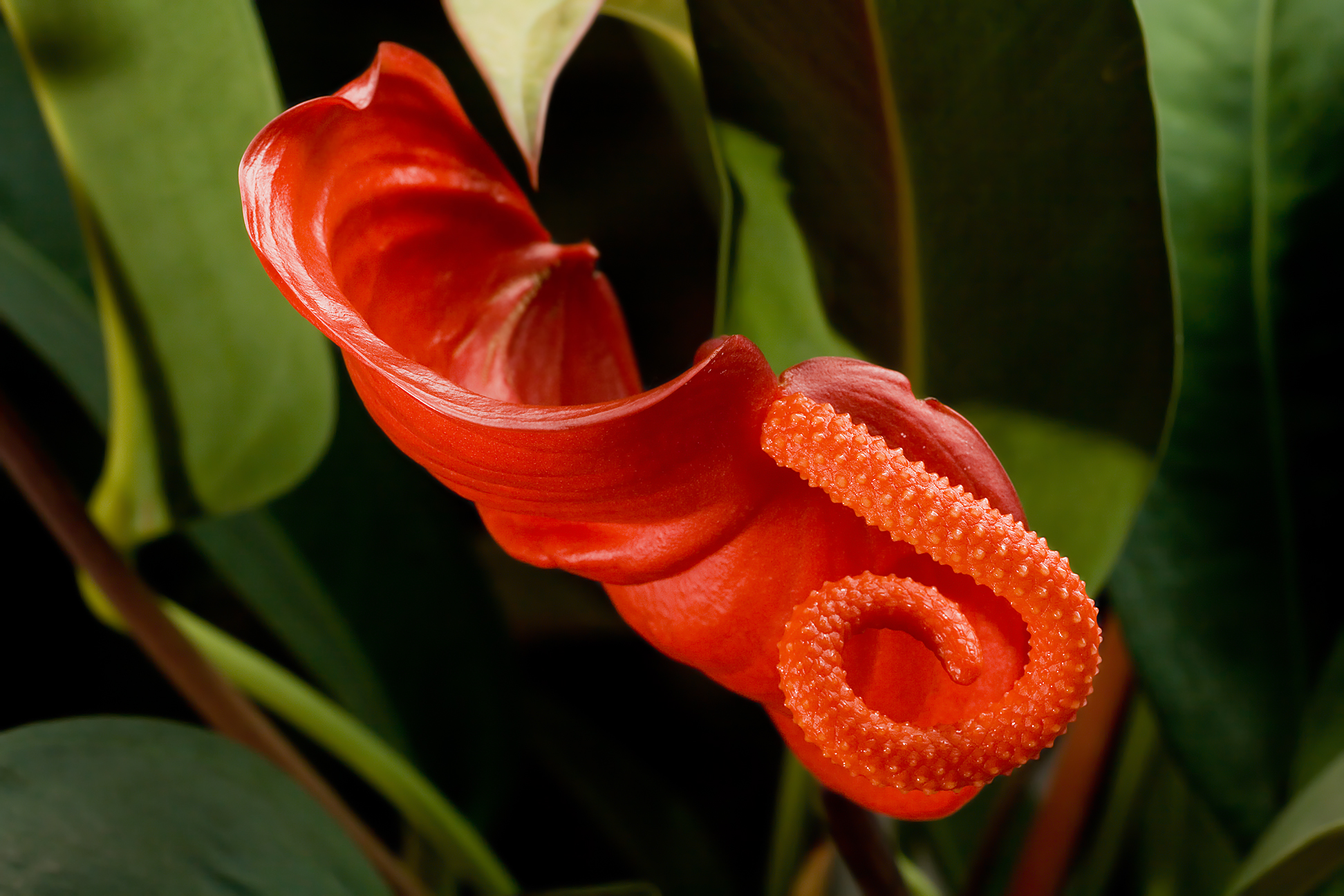
- Anthurium scherzerianum

Scientific classification
- Kingdom: Plantae
- Clade: Tracheophytes
- Clade: Angiosperms
- Clade: Monocots
- Order: Alismatales
- Family: Araceae
- Genus: Anthurium
- Section: Anthurium sect. Porphyrochitonium

Species
- See text

= Anthurium sect. Porphyrochitonium =

Group of flowering plants

Anthurium sect. Porphyrochitonium is a section within the aroid genus Anthurium which comprises about 250 species. Plants of this section are typified by A. scherzerianum, or the 'pig’s-tail' anthurium. The most definitive feature of the section is a large, bright red spathe. Other than this distinction, it shares nearly every other characteristic with section Urospadix. Species of Anthurium belonging to Porphyrochitonium are generally more "delicate" in appearance, bearing slender stems with short internodes and elongated, non-cordate, often strap-like leaf blades (such as A. wendlingeri), which are glandular-punctate on at least one surface; depending on species, inflorescences may be unremarkable in appearance, with one or more well-defined collective veins. Once pollinated, the berries generally contain three seeds.

Distribution of this section is from Costa Rica to Peru, with the highest concentration of species found in Colombia.
