= Sarawakia =

Scientific classification
- Kingdom: Plantae
- Clade: Tracheophytes
- Clade: Angiosperms
- Clade: Monocots
- Order: Alismatales
- Family: Araceae
- Subfamily: Aroideae
- Tribe: Schismatoglottideae
- Genus: Sarawakia; S.Y.Wong & P.C.Boyce

Genus of flowering plants

Sarawakia is a genus of flowering plants in the arum family, Araceae. It includes five species endemic to Borneo.

The genus was described by Sin Yeng Wong and Peter Charles Boyce in 2024, and includes species formerly placed in Schismatoglottis.

== Species ==
Five species are accepted.

- Sarawakia clausula (S.Y.Wong) S.Y.Wong & P.C.Boyce
- Sarawakia cyria (P.C.Boyce) S.Y.Wong & P.C.Boyce
- Sarawakia larynx (S.Y.Wong & P.C.Boyce) S.Y.Wong & P.C.Boyce
- Sarawakia petradoxa (S.Y.Wong & P.C.Boyce) S.Y.Wong & P.C.Boyce
- Sarawakia rejangica (S.Y.Wong & P.C.Boyce) S.Y.Wong & P.C.Boyce
