= Borneoa =

Scientific classification
- Kingdom: Plantae
- Clade: Tracheophytes
- Clade: Angiosperms
- Clade: Monocots
- Order: Alismatales
- Family: Araceae
- Subfamily: Aroideae
- Tribe: Schismatoglottideae
- Genus: Borneoa; S.Y.Wong & P.C.Boyce

Genus of flowering plants

Borneoa is a genus of flowering plants in the arum family, Araceae. It includes 22 species native to Borneo and Peninsular Malaysia.

The genus was described by Sin Yeng Wong and Peter Charles Boyce in 2024, and includes species formerly placed in Schismatoglottis.

== Species ==
22 species are accepted.

- Borneoa asperata (Engl.) S.Y.Wong & P.C.Boyce
- Borneoa barbata (Engl.) S.Y.Wong & P.C.Boyce
- Borneoa ciliata (A.Hay) S.Y.Wong & P.C.Boyce
- Borneoa crinitissima (A.Hay) S.Y.Wong & P.C.Boyce
- Borneoa crypta (P.C.Boyce & S.Y.Wong) S.Y.Wong & P.C.Boyce
- Borneoa dilecta (S.Y.Wong, P.C.Boyce & S.L.Low) S.Y.Wong & P.C.Boyce
- Borneoa ferruginea (Merr.) S.Y.Wong & P.C.Boyce
- Borneoa gampsospadix (P.C.Boyce & S.Y.Wong) S.Y.Wong & P.C.Boyce
- Borneoa gillianiae (P.C.Boyce) S.Y.Wong & P.C.Boyce
- Borneoa hottae (Bogner & Nicolson) S.Y.Wong & P.C.Boyce
- Borneoa jelandii (P.C.Boyce & S.Y.Wong) S.Y.Wong & P.C.Boyce
- Borneoa mira (S.Y.Wong, P.C.Boyce & S.L.Low) S.Y.Wong & P.C.Boyce
- Borneoa mons (Kartini) S.Y.Wong & P.C.Boyce
- Borneoa persistens (S.Y.Wong & P.C.Boyce) S.Y.Wong & P.C.Boyce
- Borneoa pyrrhias (A.Hay) S.Y.Wong & P.C.Boyce
- Borneoa scortechinii (Hook.f.) S.Y.Wong & P.C.Boyce
- Borneoa sejuncta (A.Hay) S.Y.Wong & P.C.Boyce
- Borneoa shaleicola (P.C.Boyce & S.Y.Wong) S.Y.Wong & P.C.Boyce
- Borneoa tahubangensis (A.Hay & Hersc.) S.Y.Wong & P.C.Boyce
- Borneoa tegorae (P.C.Boyce & S.Y.Wong) S.Y.Wong & P.C.Boyce
- Borneoa thelephora (S.Y.Wong, P.C.Boyce & S.L.Low) S.Y.Wong & P.C.Boyce
- Borneoa zainuddinii (Kartini, P.C.Boyce & S.Y.Wong) S.Y.Wong & P.C.Boyce
