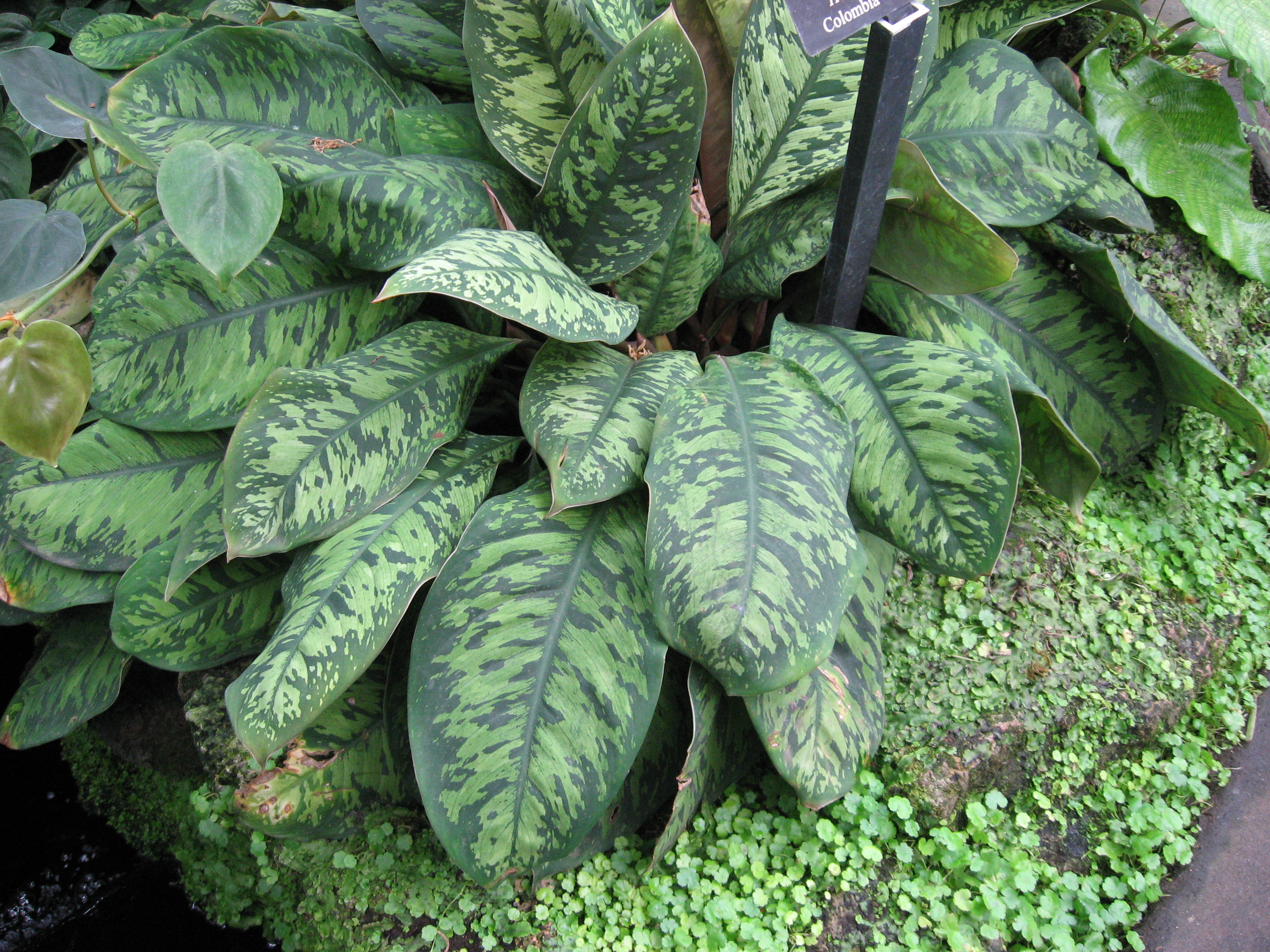
- Adelonema wallisii

Scientific classification
- Kingdom: Plantae
- Clade: Tracheophytes
- Clade: Angiosperms
- Clade: Monocots
- Order: Alismatales
- Family: Araceae
- Genus: Adelonema; Schott

= Adelonema =

Genus of flowering plants

Adelonema is a genus of plants in the family Araceae.

== Species ==
As of September 2024, Plants of the World Online accepted these species:

- Adelonema allenii (Croat) S.Y.Wong & Croat
- Adelonema crinipes (Engl.) S.Y.Wong & Croat
- Adelonema erythropus (Mart. ex Schott) Schott
- Adelonema hammelii (Croat & Grayum) S.Y.Wong & Croat
- Adelonema kvistii (Croat & Grayum) S.Y.Wong & Croat
- Adelonema mofflerianum (Croat & Grayum) S.Y.Wong & Croat
- Adelonema orientale Croat
- Adelonema pallidinervium Croat
- Adelonema panamense Croat & Mansell
- Adelonema peltatum (Mast.) S.Y.Wong & Croat
- Adelonema picturatum (Linden & André) S.Y.Wong & Croat
- Adelonema roezlii (Mast.) S.Y.Wong & Croat
- Adelonema speariae (Bogner & Moffler) S.Y.Wong & Croat
- Adelonema wallisii (Regel) S.Y.Wong & Croat
- Adelonema wendlandii (Schott) S.Y.Wong & Croat
- Adelonema yanamonoense Croat & Mansell

== See also ==
- Homalonema
- Schismatoglottis
