= Bau (plant) =

Scientific classification
- Kingdom: Plantae
- Clade: Tracheophytes
- Clade: Angiosperms
- Clade: Monocots
- Order: Alismatales
- Family: Araceae
- Subfamily: Aroideae
- Tribe: Schismatoglottideae
- Genus: Bau; S.Y.Wong & P.C.Boyce

Genus of flowering plants

Bau is a genus of flowering plants in the arum family, Araceae. It includes 26 species native to Peninsular Thailand, Peninsular Malaysia, Sumatra, Borneo, and Sulawesi.

The genus was described by Sin Yeng Wong and Peter Charles Boyce in 2024, and includes species formerly placed in Schismatoglottis.

== Species ==
26 species are accepted.

- Bau adoceta (S.Y.Wong) S.Y.Wong & P.C.Boyce
- Bau amosyui (S.Y.Wong, S.L.Low & P.C.Boyce) S.Y.Wong & P.C.Boyce
- Bau antu (S.Y.Wong & P.C.Boyce) S.Y.Wong & P.C.Boyce
- Bau brevicuspis (Hook.f.) S.Y.Wong & P.C.Boyce
- Bau camera-lucida (P.C.Boyce & S.Y.Wong) S.Y.Wong & P.C.Boyce
- Bau elegans (A.Hay) S.Y.Wong, A.Hay & P.C.Boyce
- Bau gui (P.C.Boyce & S.Y.Wong) S.Y.Wong & P.C.Boyce
- Bau hayi (S.Y.Wong & P.C.Boyce) S.Y.Wong & P.C.Boyce
- Bau hendrikii (S.Y.Wong & P.C.Boyce) S.Y.Wong & P.C.Boyce
- Bau inculta (Kurniawan & P.C.Boyce) S.Y.Wong & P.C.Boyce
- Bau latevaginata (Engl.) S.Y.Wong & P.C.Boyce
- Bau liniae (S.Y.Wong) S.Y.Wong & P.C.Boyce
- Bau matangensis (S.Y.Wong) S.Y.Wong & P.C.Boyce
- Bau meriraiensis (P.C.Boyce & S.Y.Wong) S.Y.Wong & P.C.Boyce
- Bau metallica (S.Y.Wong, Koens & P.C.Boyce) S.Y.Wong & P.C.Boyce
- Bau multinervia (M.Hotta) S.Y.Wong & P.C.Boyce
- Bau nervosa (Ridl.) S.Y.Wong & P.C.Boyce
- Bau pellucida (S.Y.Wong, P.C.Boyce & S.K.Chai) S.Y.Wong & P.C.Boyce
- Bau pocong (S.Y.Wong, S.L.Low & P.C.Boyce) S.Y.Wong & P.C.Boyce
- Bau porpax (S.Y.Wong, Kartini & P.C.Boyce) S.Y.Wong & P.C.Boyce
- Bau puberulipes (Alderw.) S.Y.Wong & P.C.Boyce
- Bau reticosa (S.Y.Wong, Koens & P.C.Boyce) S.Y.Wong & P.C.Boyce
- Bau simonii (S.Y.Wong) S.Y.Wong & P.C.Boyce
- Bau tessellata (S.Y.Wong) S.Y.Wong & P.C.Boyce
- Bau turbata (S.Y.Wong) S.Y.Wong & P.C.Boyce
- Bau ulusarikeiensis (S.Y.Wong) S.Y.Wong & P.C.Boyce
