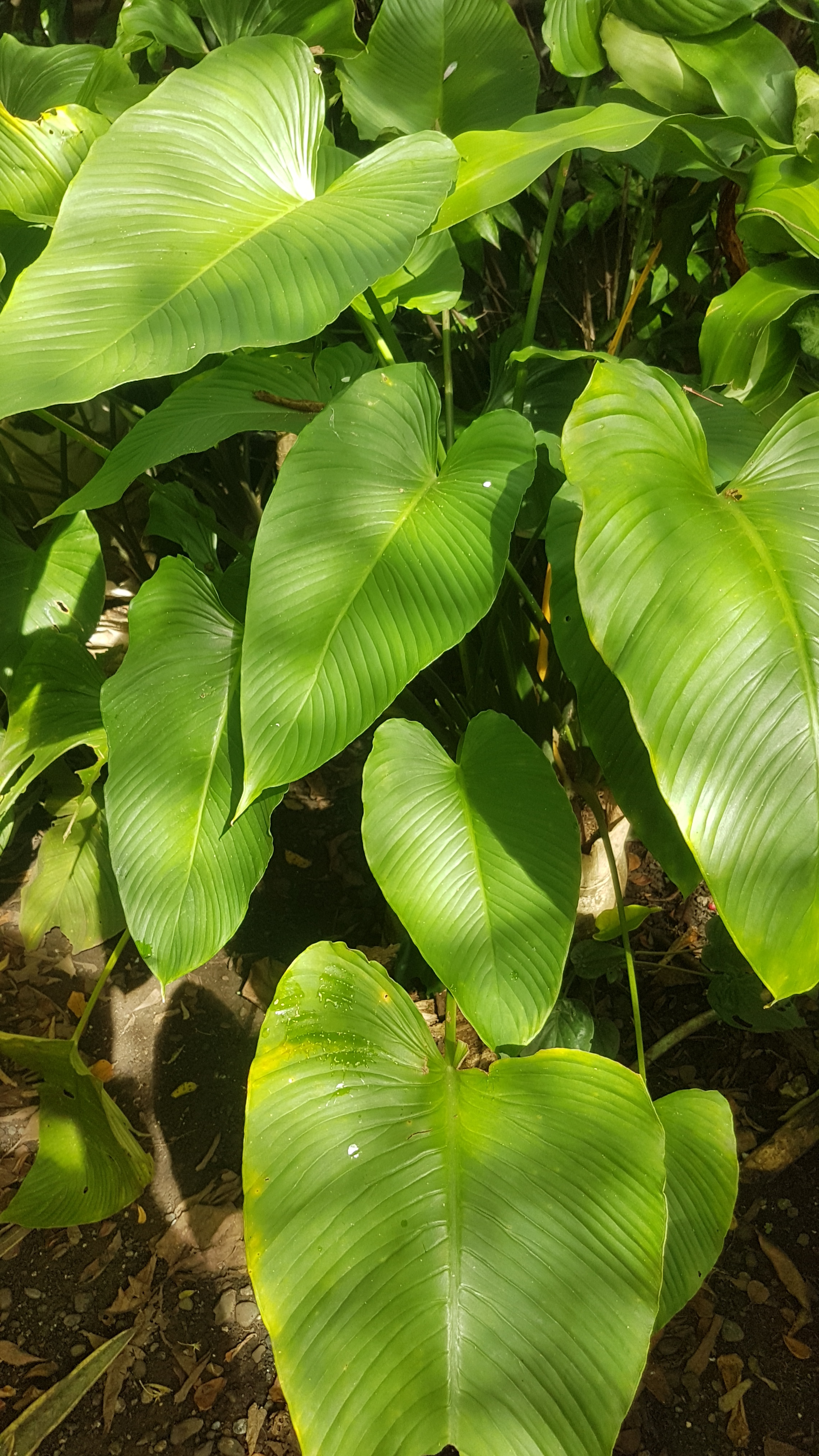
- Schismatoglottis plurivenia in the Philippines

Scientific classification
- Kingdom: Plantae
- Clade: Tracheophytes
- Clade: Angiosperms
- Clade: Monocots
- Order: Alismatales
- Family: Araceae
- Subfamily: Aroideae
- Tribe: Schismatoglottideae
- Genus: Schismatoglottis; Zoll. & Moritzi

Synonyms
- Apatemone Schott; Nebrownia Kuntze

= Schismatoglottis =

Genus of flowering plants

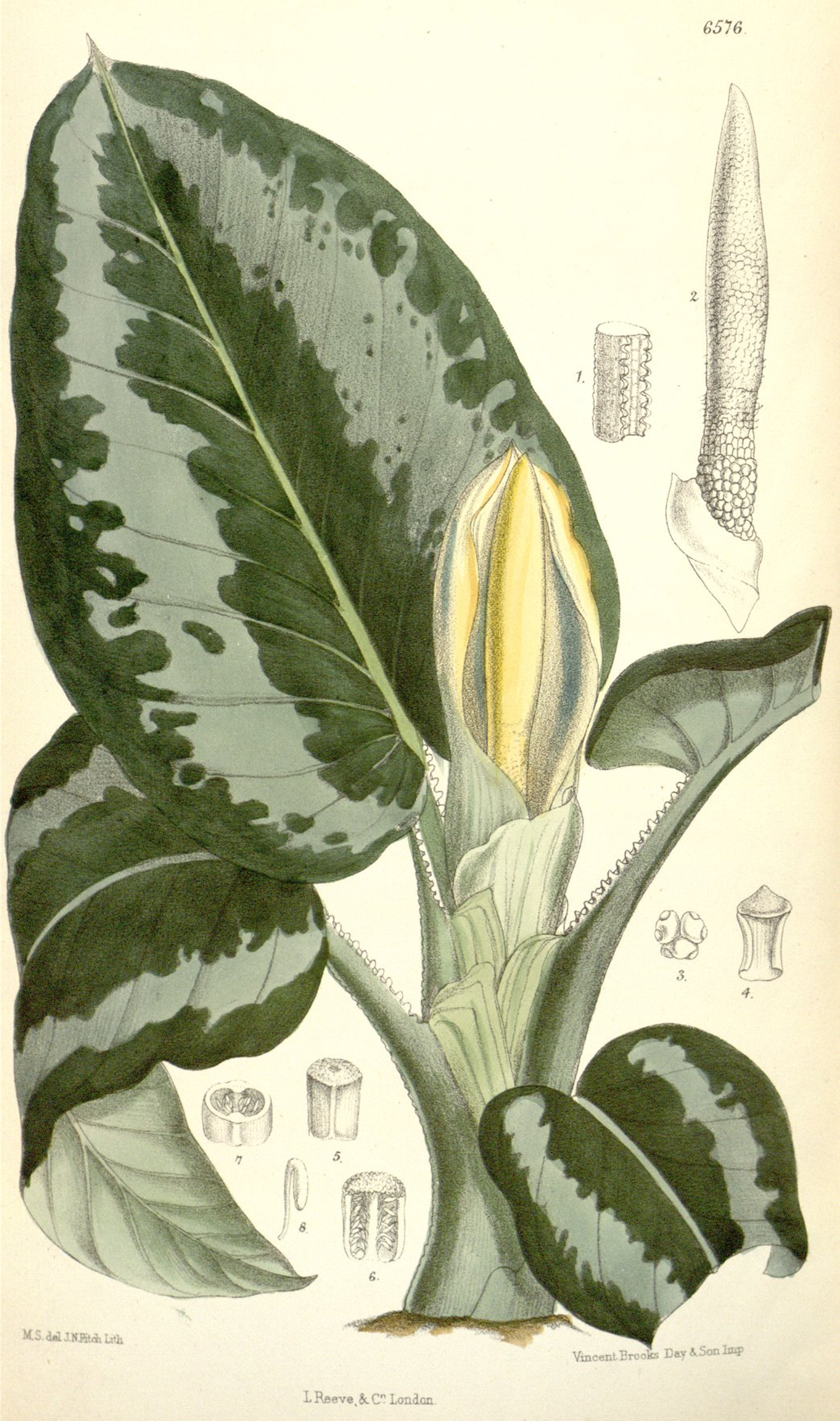
Schismatoglottis asperata

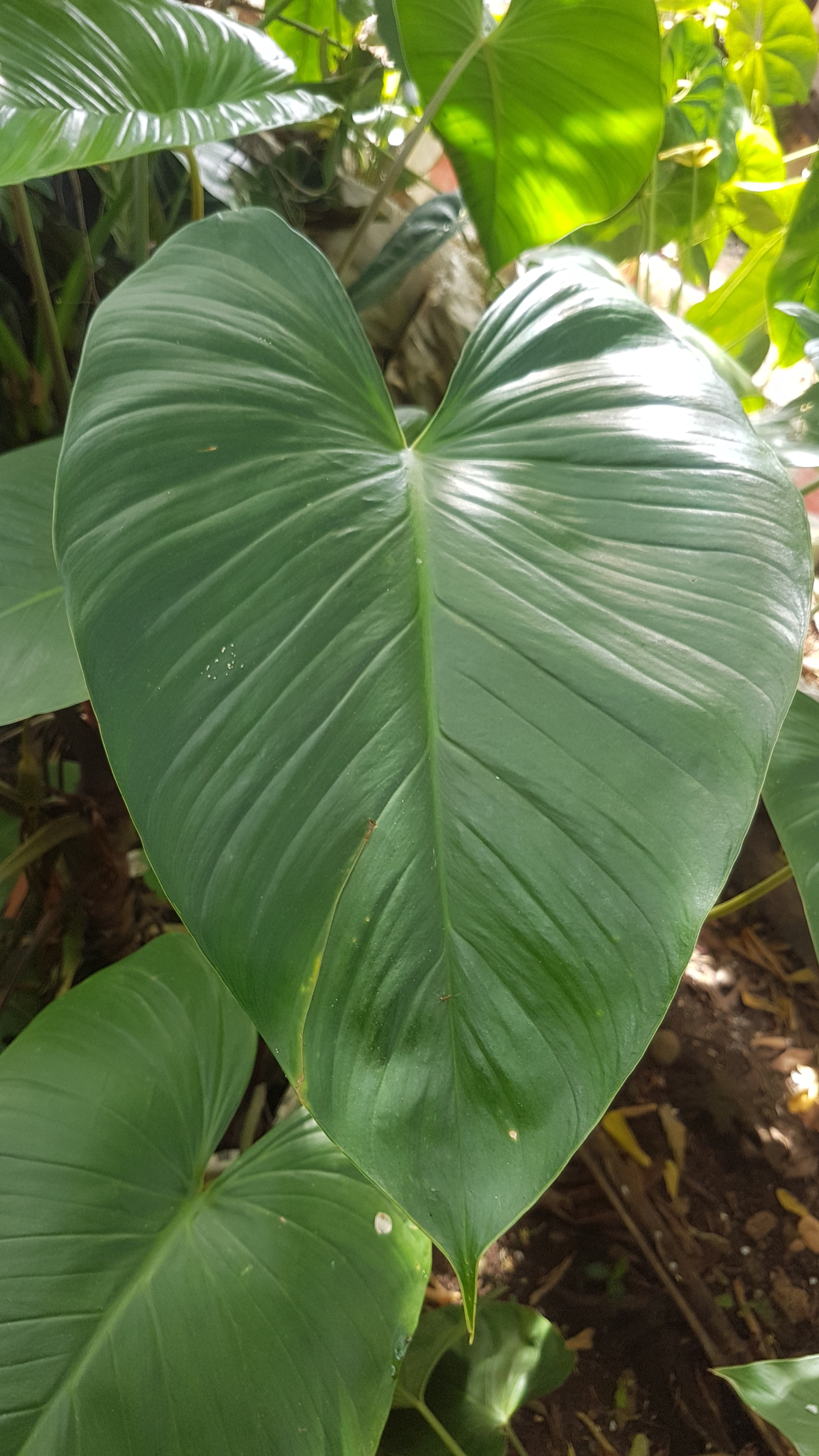
Schismatoglottis calyptrata

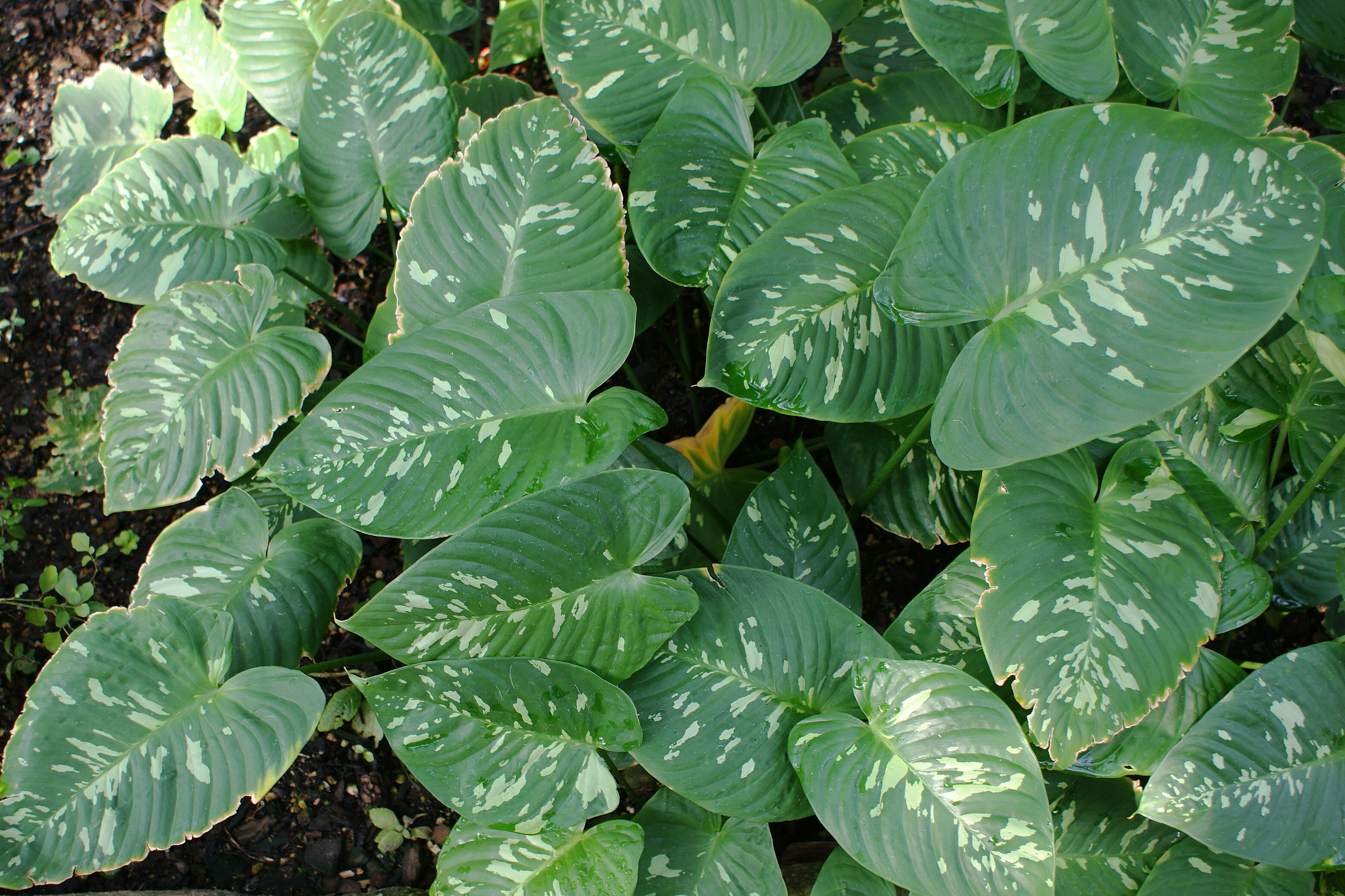
Variegated Schismatoglossis calyptrata

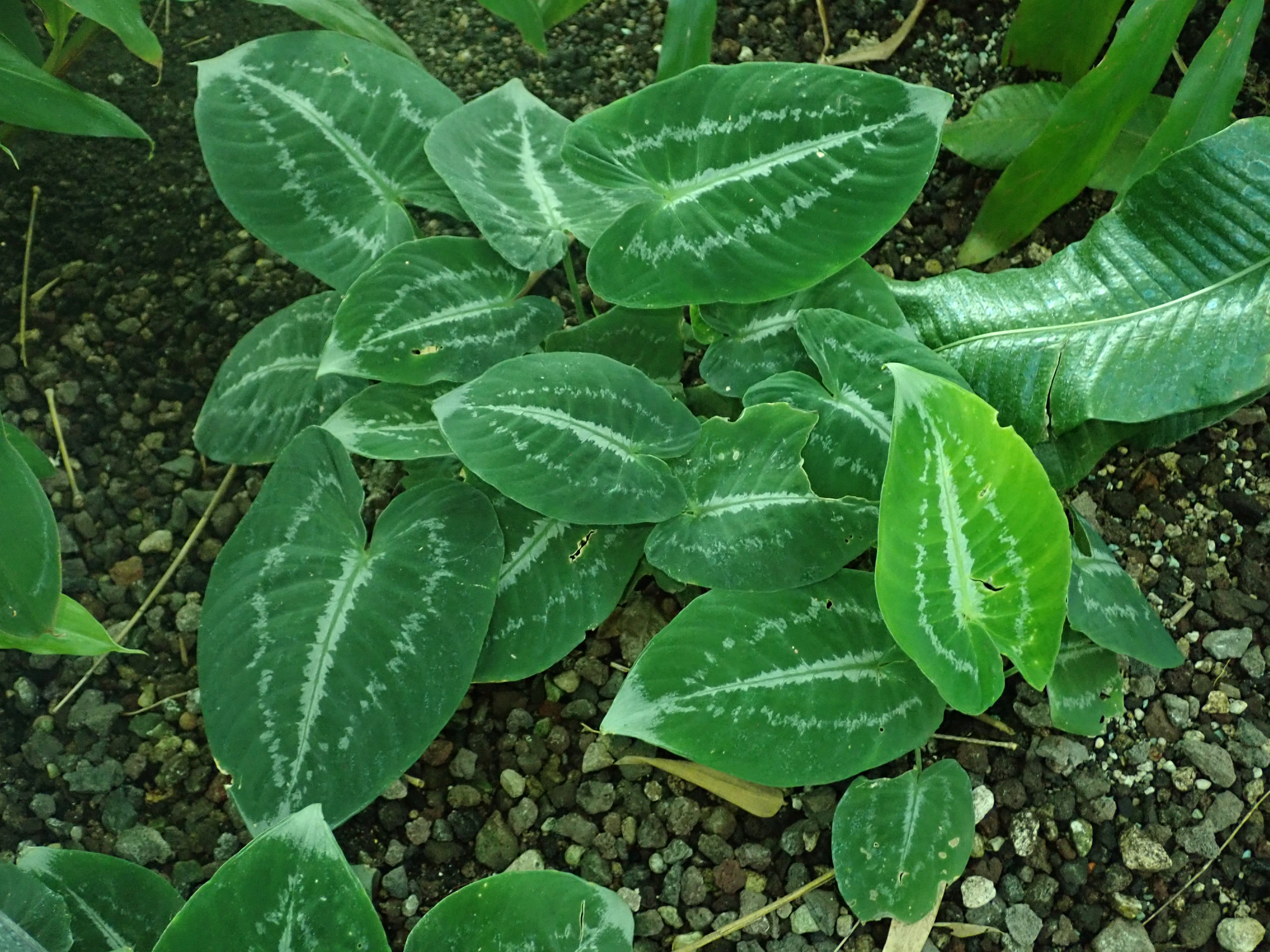
Schismatoglottis scintillans

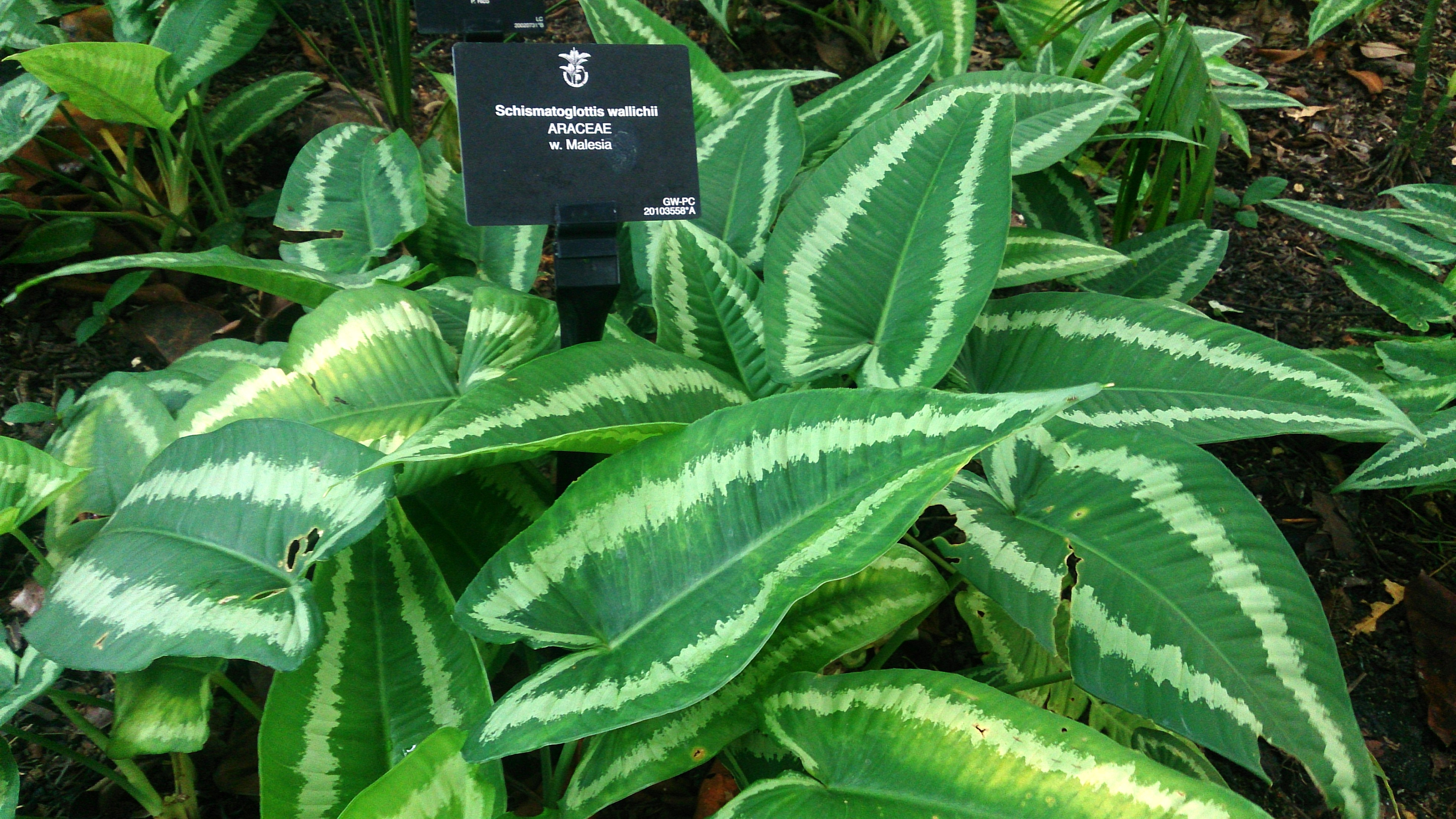
Schismatoglottis wallichii

Schismatoglottis is a genus of flowering plants in the family Araceae. Members of the genus are similar in appearance and growth habit to those of the genus Homalomena, but the two genera are not closely related. The primary difference is that the leaves of Schismatoglottis are not aromatic. Schismatoglottis are found primarily in tropical parts of Southeast Asia, New Guinea, and Melanesia. The majority of the species are native to the Island of Borneo.

Schismatoglottis prietoi, described in 2015 from the Philippines, is uniquely fully aquatic or amphibious in habitat. It forms large colonies in shallow-fast-flowing freshwater rivers in lowland forests.

In 2024 Sin Yeng Wong and Peter Charles Boyce re-circumscribed the genus based on a phylogenetic analysis, and placed some Schismatoglottis species into seven newly-described genera – Aia, Ayuantha, Bau, Borneoa, Ibania, Sarawakia, and Tweeddalea.

== Species ==
As of November 2025, Plants of the World Online accepts the following 97 species:

- Schismatoglottis acutangula Engl.
- Schismatoglottis acutifolia Engl.
- Schismatoglottis adducta S.Y.Wong & P.C.Boyce
- Schismatoglottis ahmadii A.Hay
- Schismatoglottis angustifolia Alderw.
- Schismatoglottis ardenii A.Hay
- Schismatoglottis auyongii S.Y.Wong & P.C.Boyce
- Schismatoglottis baangongensis S.Y.Wong, Y.C.Hoe & P.C.Boyce
- Schismatoglottis bifasciata Engl.
- Schismatoglottis bitaeniata Engl.
- Schismatoglottis bogneri A.Hay
- Schismatoglottis cadierei Buchet & Gagnep. ex S.Y.Wong & P.C.Boyce
- Schismatoglottis caesia S.Y.Wong, P.C.Boyce & Y.C.Hoe
- Schismatoglottis calyptrata (Roxb.) Zoll. & Moritzi
- Schismatoglottis canaliculata Engl.
- Schismatoglottis clarae A.Hay
- Schismatoglottis clemensiorum A.Hay
- Schismatoglottis clivemarshii S.Y.Wong, P.C.Boyce & Kartini
- Schismatoglottis colocasioidea M.Hotta
- Schismatoglottis conoidea Engl.
- Schismatoglottis convolvula P.C.Boyce
- Schismatoglottis cordifolia Ridl.
- Schismatoglottis decipiens A.Hay
- Schismatoglottis diversicolor Alderw.
- Schismatoglottis djamuensis Engl.
- Schismatoglottis ecaudata A.Hay
- Schismatoglottis edanoi A.Hay
- Schismatoglottis emarginata Engl.
- Schismatoglottis engleriana Alderw.
- Schismatoglottis eximia Engl.
- Schismatoglottis eymae A.Hay
- Schismatoglottis giamensis S.Y.Wong, Y.C.Hoe & P.C.Boyce
- Schismatoglottis glauca Engl.
- Schismatoglottis grabowskii Engl.
- Schismatoglottis guabatuensis S.Y.Wong & P.C.Boyce
- Schismatoglottis hainanensis H.Li
- Schismatoglottis harmandii Engl.
- Schismatoglottis hellwigiana Engl.
- Schismatoglottis heterodoxa S.Y.Wong
- Schismatoglottis ifugaoensis S.Y.Wong, Bogner & P.C.Boyce
- Schismatoglottis irrorata Engl.
- Schismatoglottis klossii Ridl.
- Schismatoglottis laxipistillata S.Y.Wong, P.C.Boyce & Y.C.Hoe
- Schismatoglottis lingua A.Hay
- Schismatoglottis longipes Miq.
- Schismatoglottis longispatha W.Bull
- Schismatoglottis lowiae S.Y.Wong & P.C.Boyce
- Schismatoglottis luzonensis Engl.
- Schismatoglottis merrillii Engl.
- Schismatoglottis mindanaoana Engl.
- Schismatoglottis minuta Tandang & M.D.Angeles
- Schismatoglottis modesta Schott
- Schismatoglottis moodii A.Hay
- Schismatoglottis motleyana (Schott) Engl.
- Schismatoglottis muluensis M.Hotta
- Schismatoglottis neoguineensis (Linden ex André) N.E.Br.
- Schismatoglottis niahensis A.Hay
- Schismatoglottis nieuwenhuisii Engl.
- Schismatoglottis pantiensis S.Y.Wong, P.C.Boyce & Y.C.Hoe
- Schismatoglottis parvifolia Alderw.
- Schismatoglottis penangensis Engl.
- Schismatoglottis picta Schott
- Schismatoglottis plurivenia Alderw.
- Schismatoglottis potamophila Alderw.
- Schismatoglottis priapica S.Y.Wong, P.C.Boyce & Kartini
- Schismatoglottis prietoi P.C.Boyce, Medecilo & S.Y.Wong
- Schismatoglottis pseudocalyptrata Alderw.
- Schismatoglottis pulchra N.E.Br.
- Schismatoglottis pumila Hallier f. ex Engl.
- Schismatoglottis pusilla Engl.
- Schismatoglottis ranchanensis S.Y.Wong
- Schismatoglottis riparia Schott
- Schismatoglottis roh S.Y.Wong, Y.C.Hoe & P.C.Boyce
- Schismatoglottis roseopedes S.Y.Wong, P.C.Boyce & S.K.Chai
- Schismatoglottis ruttenii Alderw.
- Schismatoglottis saafiei Kartini, P.C.Boyce & S.Y.Wong
- Schismatoglottis samarensis A.Hay
- Schismatoglottis schottii Bogner & Nicolson
- Schismatoglottis scintillans Scherber. & P.C.Boyce
- Schismatoglottis serratodentata S.Y.Wong, P.C.Boyce & S.K.Chai
- Schismatoglottis silamensis A.Hay
- Schismatoglottis sublaxiflora Alderw.
- Schismatoglottis subundulata (Zoll. ex Schott) Nicolson
- Schismatoglottis tenuifolia Engl.
- Schismatoglottis trifasciata Engl.
- Schismatoglottis trivittata Hallier
- Schismatoglottis trusmadiensis A.Hay & Mood
- Schismatoglottis unifolia A.Hay & P.C.Boyce
- Schismatoglottis vanvuurenii Alderw.
- Schismatoglottis venusta A.Hay
- Schismatoglottis viridissima A.Hay
- Schismatoglottis wahaiana Alderw.
- Schismatoglottis wallichii Hook.f.
- Schismatoglottis warburgiana Engl.
- Schismatoglottis winkleri Engl.
- Schismatoglottis wongii A.Hay
- Schismatoglottis zonata Hallier f.

=== Formerly placed here ===
- Aia tseui (S.Y.Wong & P.C.Boyce) S.Y.Wong & P.C.Boyce (as Schismatoglottis tseui S.Y.Wong & P.C.Boyce)

== See also ==
- Homalomena
- Adelonema
