= Schismatoglottis prietoi =

Scientific classification
- Kingdom: Plantae
- Clade: Embryophytes
- Clade: Tracheophytes
- Clade: Angiosperms
- Clade: Monocots
- Order: Alismatales
- Family: Araceae
- Genus: Schismatoglottis
- Species: S. prietoi

Binomial name
- Schismatoglottis prietoi P.C.Boyce, Medecilo & S.Y.Wong

Species of aquatic plant from the Philippines

Schismatoglottis prietoi is an aquatic and semi-aquatic plant species in the family Araceae. It is endemic to the Philippines in fast-flowing freshwater rivers in lowland forests. It is the only known species in the genus Schismatoglottis that can grow in a fully aquatic habitat. It is a small plant, growing only up to 2 to 8 cm (0.79 to 3.15 in) tall. The pale green to green leaves are smooth and are around 3 to 4 cm (1.2 to 1.6 in) long and 1 to 2 cm (0.39 to 0.79 in) wide. They are oblong to elliptical in shape with sharply pointed tips and broadly wavy edges. It bears a single white flower that produces an unpleasant odor at the base, reminiscent of spoiled milk. It is colonial, growing in dense clumps through stolons.

Schismatoglottis prietoi was described by Peter C. Boyce, Melanie P. Medecilo & Wong Sin Yeng in 2015. The species was first brought to the attention of the authors in 2013 by Esquerion P. Prieto, an engineer and aquatic plant enthusiast in Cebu City, for whom the species is named after. At the time of publication, the species was only known from specimens collected from populations (all discovered by Prieto) in the islands of Cebu and Luzon.

Schismatoglottis prietoi is used in aquascaping. It is often compared to the more common Anubias species.

== See also ==
- List of threatened species of the Philippines
