= Ibania imbakensis =

Scientific classification
- Kingdom: Plantae
- Clade: Tracheophytes
- Clade: Angiosperms
- Clade: Monocots
- Order: Alismatales
- Family: Araceae
- Genus: Ibania
- Species: I. imbakensis

Binomial name
- Ibania imbakensis (Kartini, S.Y.Wong & P.C.Boyce) S.Y.Wong & P.C.Boyce

Synonyms
- Schismatoglottis imbakensis Kartini, S.Y.Wong & P.C.Boyce

Species of plant

Ibania imbakensis is a species of flowering plant in the family Araceae. It is a herbaceous rhizomatous geophyte endemic to the Malaysian state of Sabah in northern Borneo. The plant was first described in 2020, during an exhibition led by scientists from the Sabah Foundation and the University of Malaysia Sabah to the Sungai Kangkawat, Imbak Canyon Conservation Area (ICCA) in Tongod District.

== Discovery ==
In 2020, scientists from the Sabah Foundation and the University of Malaysia Sabah led a group on a Borneo geographic scientific expedition to the Sungai Kangkawat. In the Imbak Canyon Conservation Area (ICCA) they discovered a small colony of plants with the distinctive leaf venation of the Patentinervia Clade of genus Schismatoglottis. The Patentinervia clade is unique in that it is entirely Bornean in origin and has peculiar characteristics such as short, obovate leaf blades without posterior lobes, and a ladder-like appearance, and included only one known sole species, Schismatoglottis retinervia from Mount Kinabalu. Due to its distinctive appearance, discovery location, UMS prototype, and holotype BORH 2705, researchers came to the conclusion that this new undescribed species also belonged to the Patentinerva clade and was given the name Schismatoglottis imbakensis. At the time of its discovery the species was sterile and residing on an ultrabasic rock. In 2024 S.Y.Wong & P.C.Boyce, two of the three authors who named the species in 2020, placed the species in the newly-described genus Ibania as I. imbakensis.

== Description ==
Physically, Ibania imbakensis is described as a mesophytic herb that forms tiny colonies and can reach heights of up to 10 cm. Epigeal stems, erect spreading, decumbent sections that tend to root along their length, modules that are pleionanthic, internodes that are 0.2-1 cm long and green are some of its distinguishing features.

== Habitat ==
Ibania imbakensis inhabits primary lowland mixed dipterocarp forest on Cretaceous Harzburgite and Serpentinite outcrops, located about 270 meters above the flood zone on steep, muddy river banks.
