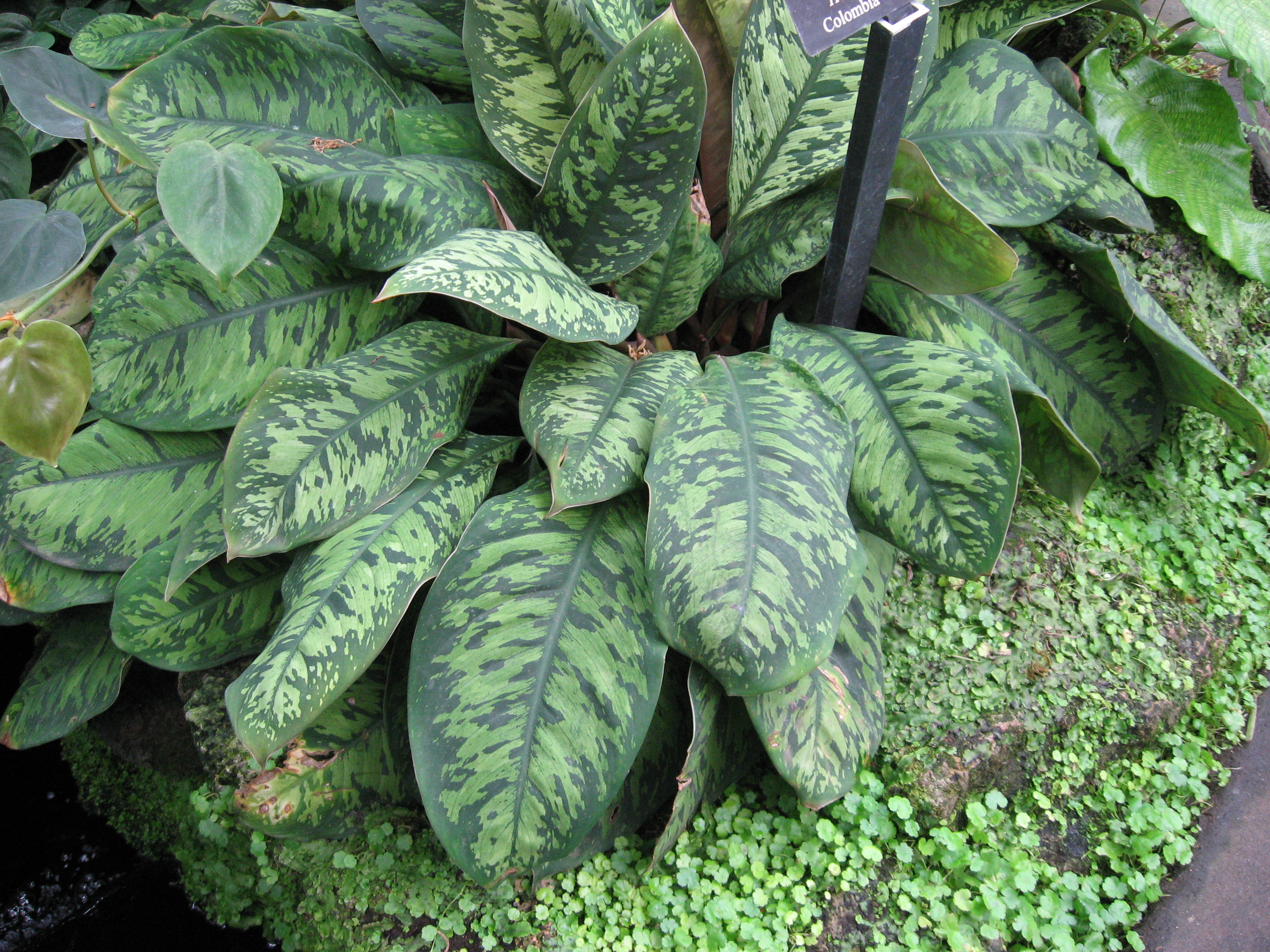

Scientific classification
- Kingdom: Plantae
- Clade: Tracheophytes
- Clade: Angiosperms
- Clade: Monocots
- Order: Alismatales
- Family: Araceae
- Genus: Adelonema
- Species: A. wallisii

Binomial name
- Adelonema wallisii Regel

Synonyms
- Curmeria wallisii (Regel) Masl.; Homalomena wallisii Regel

= Adelonema wallisii =

Species of flowering plant

Adelonema wallisii (synonym Homalomena wallisii) is a species of aroid plant (family Araceae) native to Venezuela, Colombia, and Panama.

== Taxonomy ==
It reaches about 6 in (15 cm) in height, but with a much wider horizontal spread. The leaf blades are elliptic to ovate-oblong in shape about 5–8 in (13–20 cm) in length, on rather short stalks, arching or recurving, bright-green with a markings of a marbled yellow.

== Clarification ==
It can be confused with the related genera Aglaonema or Dieffenbachia, especially Aglaonema pictum 'Tricolor' or Dieffenbachia 'Reflector', both of which have similar markings.
