= Ayuantha =

Scientific classification
- Kingdom: Plantae
- Clade: Tracheophytes
- Clade: Angiosperms
- Clade: Monocots
- Order: Alismatales
- Family: Araceae
- Subfamily: Aroideae
- Tribe: Schismatoglottideae
- Genus: Ayuantha; S.Y.Wong & P.C.Boyce

Genus of flowering plants

Ayuantha is a genus of flowering plants in the arum family, Araceae. It includes four species endemic to Borneo.

The genus was described by Sin Yeng Wong and Peter Charles Boyce in 2024, and includes species formerly placed in Schismatoglottis.

== Species ==
Four species are accepted.

- Ayuantha evelyniae (P.C.Boyce & S.Y.Wong) S.Y.Wong & P.C.Boyce
- Ayuantha petri (A.Hay) S.Y.Wong & P.C.Boyce
- Ayuantha platystigma (M.Hotta) S.Y.Wong & P.C.Boyce
- Ayuantha pudenda (A.Hay) S.Y.Wong & P.C.Boyce
