= Tweeddalea =

Scientific classification
- Kingdom: Plantae
- Clade: Tracheophytes
- Clade: Angiosperms
- Clade: Monocots
- Order: Alismatales
- Family: Araceae
- Subfamily: Aroideae
- Tribe: Schismatoglottideae
- Genus: Tweeddalea; S.Y.Wong & P.C.Boyce

Genus of flowering plants

Tweeddalea is a genus of flowering plants in the arum family, Araceae. It includes 14 species endemic to Borneo.

The genus was described by Sin Yeng Wong and Peter Charles Boyce in 2024, and includes species formerly placed in Schismatoglottis.

== Species ==
14 species are accepted.

- Tweeddalea bauensis (A.Hay & C.Lee) S.Y.Wong & P.C.Boyce
- Tweeddalea bulbifera (H.Okada, Tsukaya & Y.Mori) S.Y.Wong & P.C.Boyce
- Tweeddalea confinis (S.Y.Wong & P.C.Boyce) S.Y.Wong & P.C.Boyce
- Tweeddalea dulosa (S.Y.Wong) S.Y.Wong & P.C.Boyce
- Tweeddalea erecta (M.Hotta) S.Y.Wong & P.C.Boyce
- Tweeddalea hayana (Bogner & P.C.Boyce) S.Y.Wong & P.C.Boyce
- Tweeddalea iliata (S.Y.Wong & P.C.Boyce) S.Y.Wong & P.C.Boyce
- Tweeddalea jitinae (S.Y.Wong) S.Y.Wong & P.C.Boyce
- Tweeddalea maelii (P.C.Boyce & S.Y.Wong) S.Y.Wong & P.C.Boyce
- Tweeddalea mayoana (Bogner & M.Hotta) S.Y.Wong & P.C.Boyce
- Tweeddalea monoplacenta (M.Hotta) S.Y.Wong & P.C.Boyce
- Tweeddalea multiflora (Ridl.) S.Y.Wong & P.C.Boyce
- Tweeddalea nicolsonii (A.Hay) S.Y.Wong & P.C.Boyce
- Tweeddalea roseospatha (Bogner) S.Y.Wong & P.C.Boyce
