= Anthurium lentii =

Scientific classification
- Kingdom: Plantae
- Clade: Tracheophytes
- Clade: Angiosperms
- Clade: Monocots
- Order: Alismatales
- Family: Araceae
- Genus: Anthurium
- Species: A. lentii

Binomial name
- Anthurium lentii Croat & R.A.Baker

Species of flowering plant

Anthurium lentii is a species of flowering plant in the family Araceae, native to Colombia, Costa Rica and Panama. It grows in wet tropical habitats, and is a member of section Digitinervium.

== Description ==
Anthurium lentii is a terrestrial or epithytic perennial subshrub.

Height is 56 to 120 cm (22 to 47 in); stems are usually short and about 2–3 cm (0.8–1.2 in) in diameter.

Leaves are 15 to 50 cm (6 to 20 in) in length; broad, ovate, glabrous, mid-green, with prominent veins. The inflorescence is erect to spreading, with a peduncle 30–88 cm (12–35 in) long and 5–10 mm (0.2–0.4 in) in diameter. Flowers are contained in tight spirals on a spadix which is elongated into a spike shape. The spathe is green to greenish-purple; narrowly ovate-oblong to oblong-lanceolate, 8 to 14 cm (3.1 to 5.5 in) long and 2.8–3.9 cm (1.1–1.5 in) wide. The spadix is purple, 12 to 25 cm (5 to 10 in) long and measuring 8–13 mm (0.3–0.5 in) in diameter at base. Immature berries are white, oblong-linear, square in cross-section, and 10 mm (0.4 in) long. Mature berries are purple, ovoid and prominently beaked, the basal portion 6.5–8.5 mm (0.26–0.33 in) in diameter, round in cross-section, the beak reddish-violet.

== Toxicity ==
All parts of the plant contain calcium oxalate crystals, an irritant to the mouth and esophagus. It is toxic to cats and dogs.
