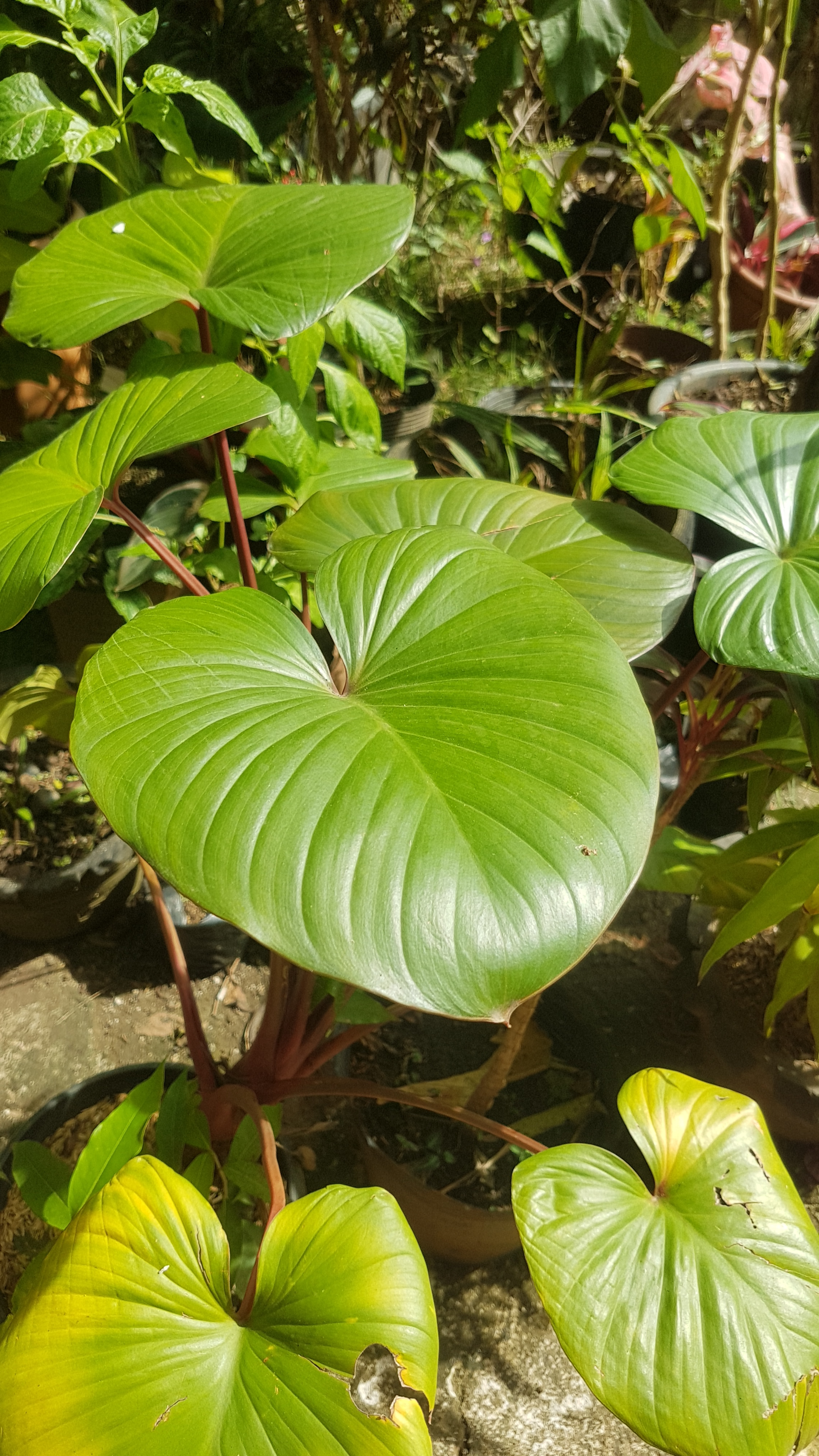
- Homalomena rubescens

Scientific classification
- Kingdom: Plantae
- Clade: Tracheophytes
- Clade: Angiosperms
- Clade: Monocots
- Order: Alismatales
- Family: Araceae
- Subfamily: Aroideae
- Tribe: Homalomeneae
- Genus: Homalomena; Schott

Diversity
- c. 160 species

Synonyms
- Chamaecladon Miq.; Curmeria Linden & André; Cyrtocladon Griff.; Diandriella Engl.; Spirospatha Raf.

= Homalomena =

Genus of flowering plants

Homalomena is a genus of flowering plants in the family Araceae. Homalomena are native to tropical Asia and China. Many Homalomena have a strong smell of anise. The name derives apparently from a mistranslated Malayan vernacular name, translated as homalos, meaning flat, and mene = moon.

The plants of this genus are clump-forming evergreen perennials with mainly heart-shaped or arrowheaded shaped leaves. The flowers are tiny and without petals, enclosed in a usually greenish spathe hidden by the leaves.

Some authors have proposed splitting the genus and moving all the neotropical species of Homalomena to Adelonema.

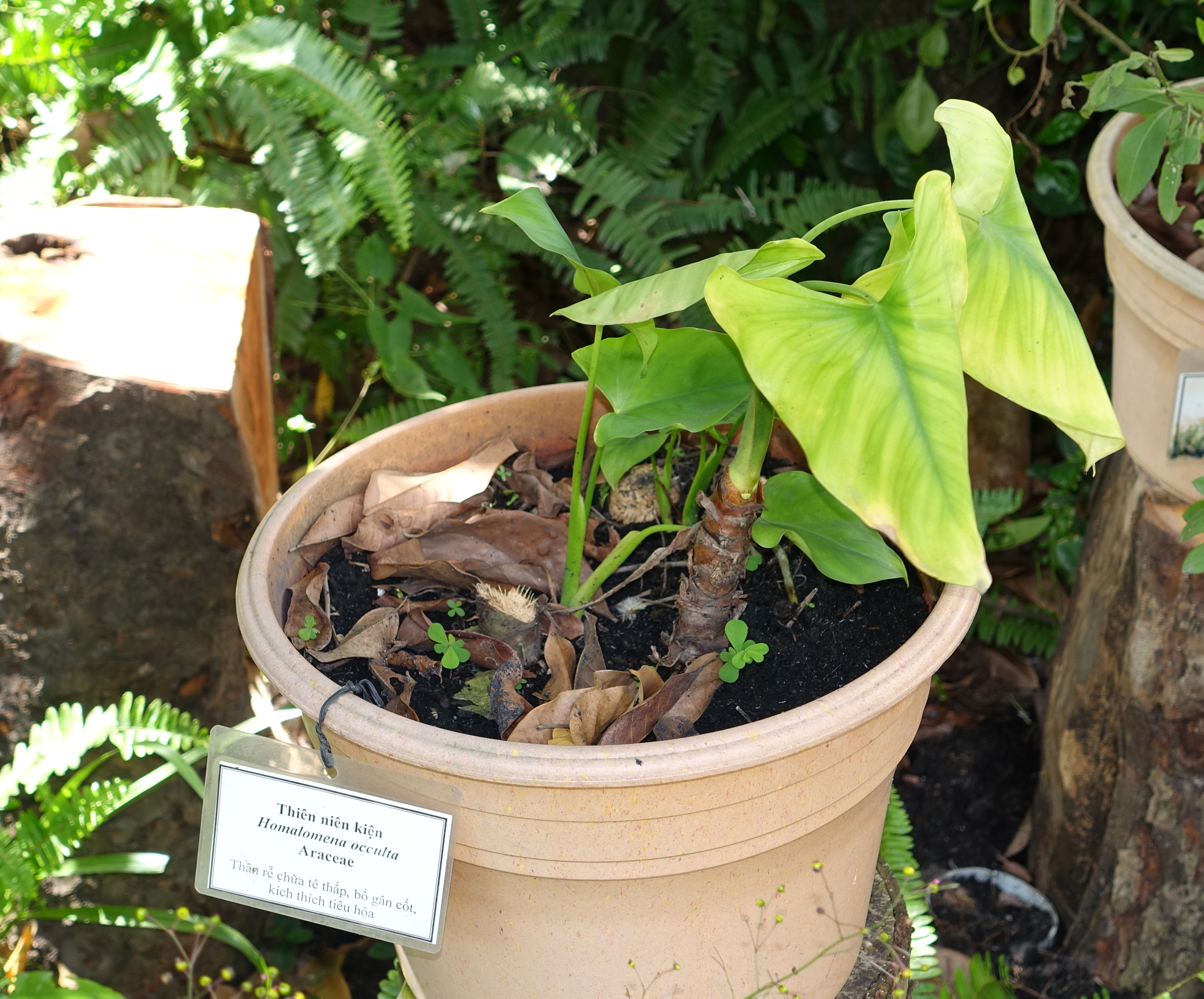
Homalomena occulta

== Selected species ==
- Homalomena expedita A.Hay & Hersc. – Borneo (Sarawak)
- Homalomena philippinensis Engl. – Philippines, Taiwan (Lanyu Island)

== See also ==
- Schismatoglottis
