= Homalomena expedita =

Scientific classification
- Kingdom: Plantae
- Clade: Tracheophytes
- Clade: Angiosperms
- Clade: Monocots
- Order: Alismatales
- Family: Araceae
- Genus: Homalomena
- Species: H. expedita

Binomial name
- Homalomena expedita A.Hay & Hersc.

Species of plant

Homalomena expedita is a species of flowering plant in the arum family Araceae, native to Borneo. A facultative aquatic perennial, in the wild it is found in well-lit swamps and ditches near sea level, even in tidal mudflats, suggesting that it can handle high salinity. In Sarawak it is known in cultivation as an ornamental, and it is regularly available for sale in Bangkok, with the sourcing said to be southern Thailand.
