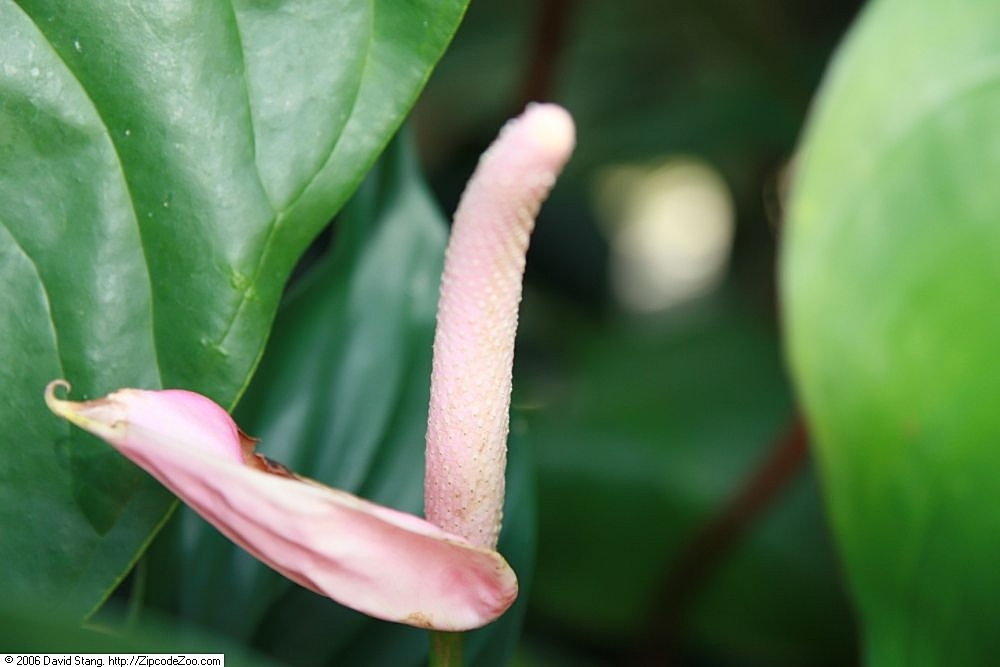
- Close-up of inflorescence
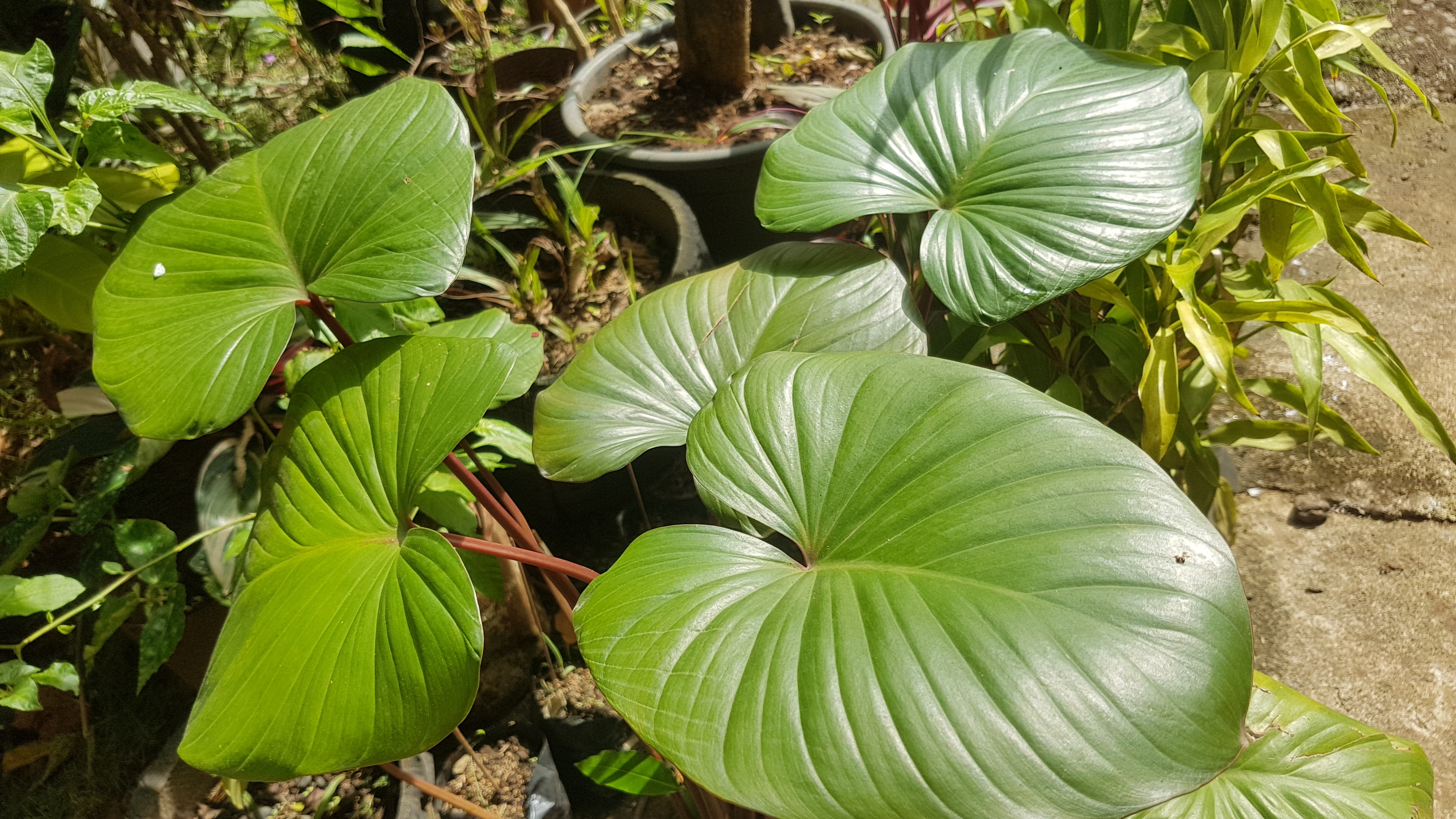
- Potted specimen

Scientific classification
- Kingdom: Plantae
- Clade: Embryophytes
- Clade: Tracheophytes
- Clade: Spermatophytes
- Clade: Angiosperms
- Clade: Monocots
- Order: Alismatales
- Family: Araceae
- Genus: Homalomena
- Species: H. rubescens

Binomial name
- Homalomena rubescens (Roxb.) Kunth

Synonyms
- Calla rubescens Roxb.; Chamaecladon rubens W.Bull; Chamaecladon rubescens (Roxb.) Schott; Zantedeschia rubens K.Koch

= Homalomena rubescens =

Species of plant

Homalomena rubescens is a species of flowering plant in the family Araceae. It is native to Assam, Sikkim, Bangladesh, and Myanmar. A subshrub, it is typically found in the wet tropics. As a houseplant it requires copious amounts of water. There appears to be a cultivar, 'Maggy'.
