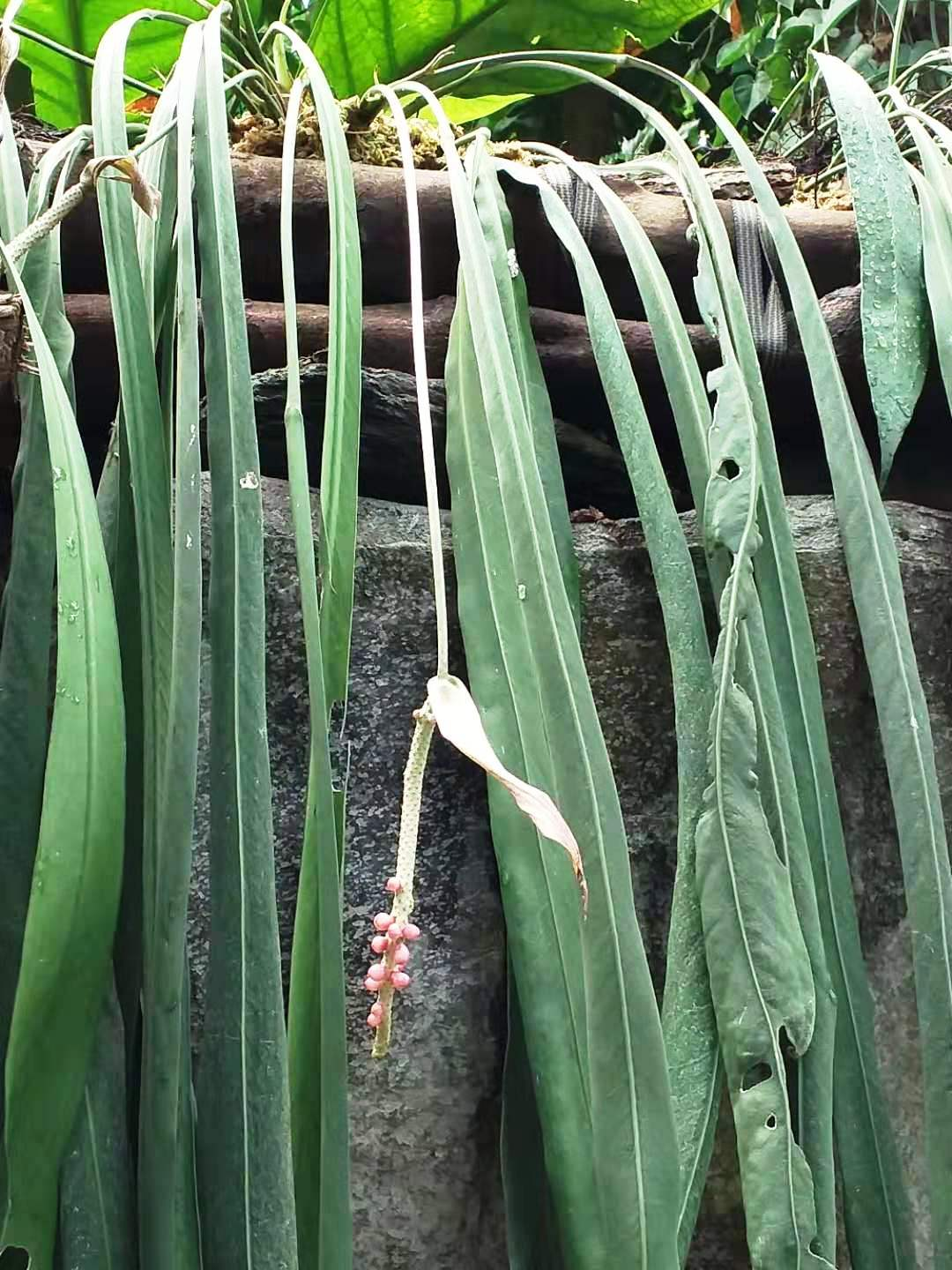
- Growing at the Botanical Garden of the National Museum of Natural Science, Taiwan

Scientific classification
- Kingdom: Plantae
- Clade: Tracheophytes
- Clade: Angiosperms
- Clade: Monocots
- Order: Alismatales
- Family: Araceae
- Genus: Anthurium
- Species: A. vittariifolium

Binomial name
- Anthurium vittariifolium Engl.

= Anthurium vittariifolium =

Species of plant

Anthurium vittariifolium is a species of flowering plant in the genus Anthurium (family Araceae) native to the Amazon basin; southeast Colombia, Ecuador, Peru, and northern Brazil. With its long, pendulous leaves that can reach 2.4 m (8 ft), it is among those commonly known as "strap-leaved" anthuriums. It grows as an epiphyte at lower elevations of moist tropical forests, and is a member of the section Leptanthurium along with Anthurium gracile.
