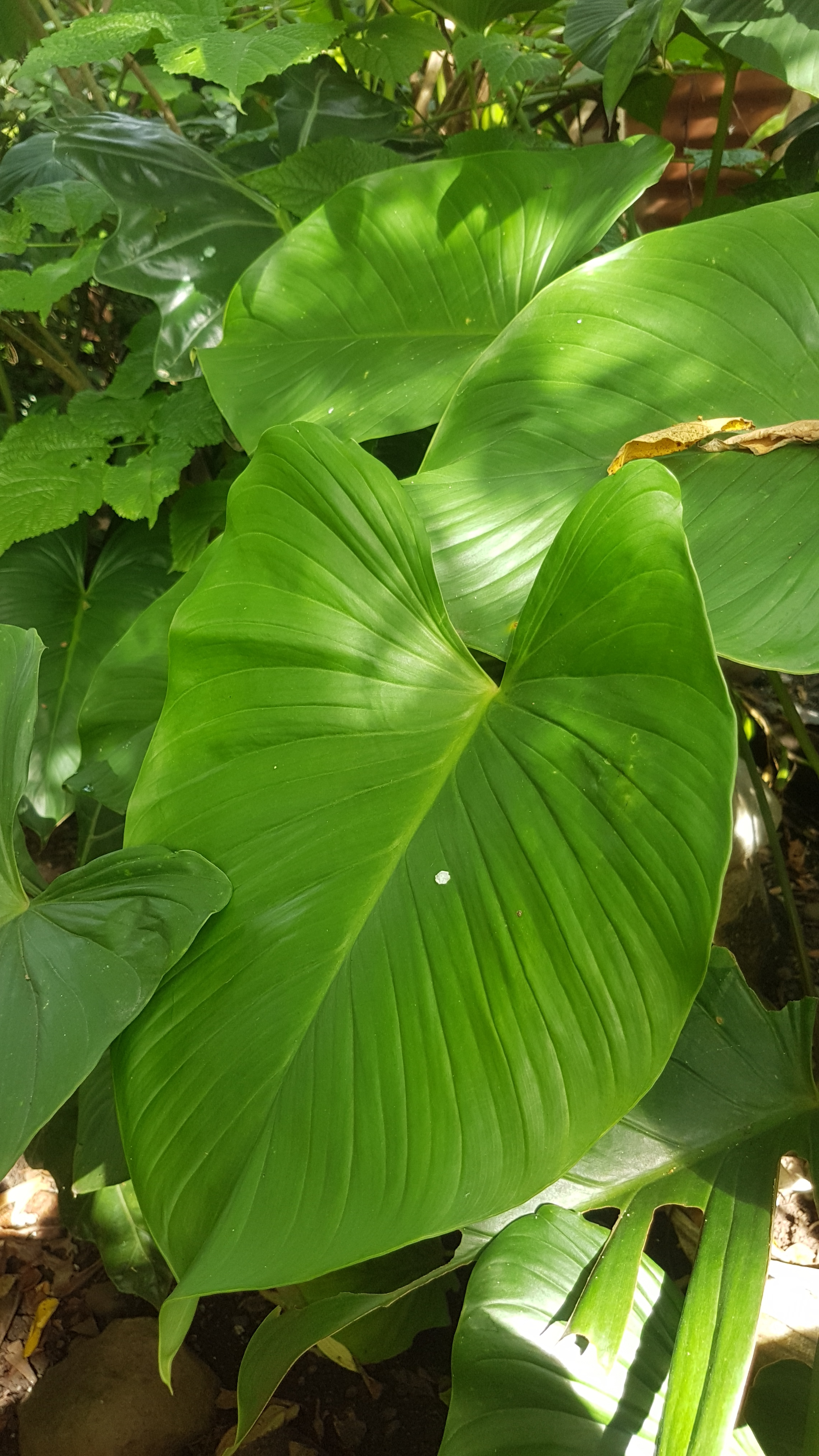
- Homalomena philippinensis in Mindanao, Philippines
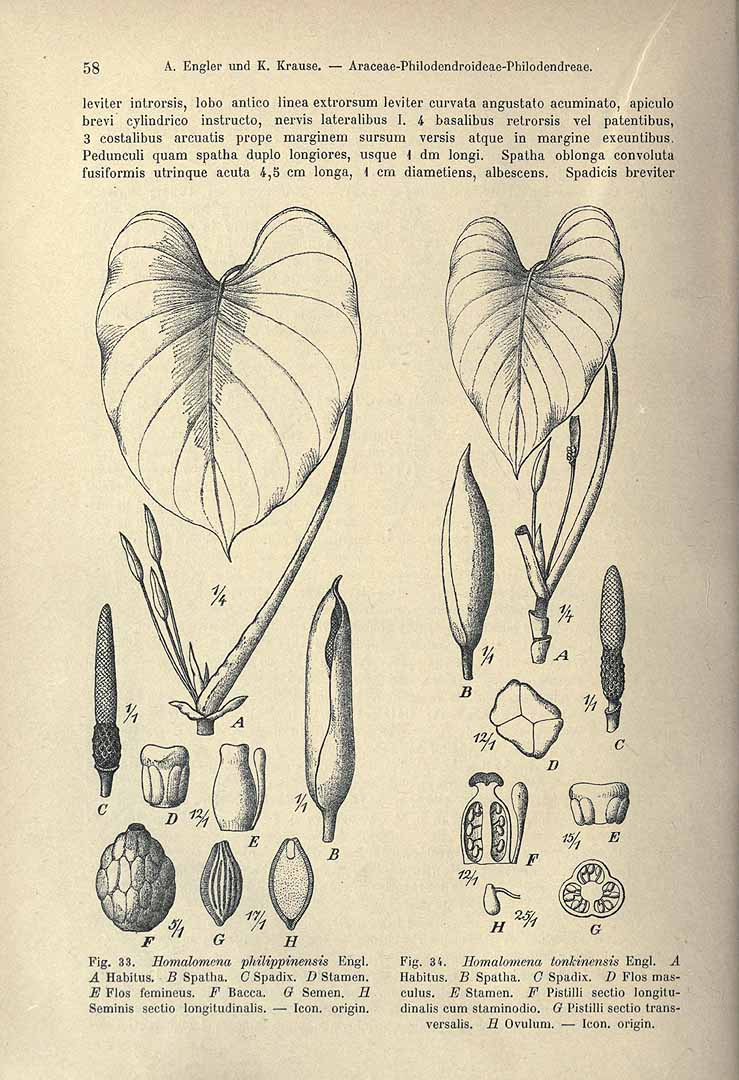
- Original botanical illustration of Homalomena philippinensis (left) by Adolf Engler (1912)

Scientific classification
- Kingdom: Plantae
- Clade: Tracheophytes
- Clade: Angiosperms
- Clade: Monocots
- Order: Alismatales
- Family: Araceae
- Genus: Homalomena
- Species: H. philippinensis

Binomial name
- Homalomena philippinensis Engl.

Synonyms
- Homalomena rubescens var. latifolia Engl.

= Homalomena philippinensis =

Species of flowering plant

Homalomena philippinensis is a species of flowering plants in the family Araceae. It is native to the Philippines and Orchid Island in Taiwan. The plant has large heart-shaped leaves that grow up to around 1 m (3.3 ft) tall from an underground corm. It grows at low elevations usually in forests and along bodies of water. It is commonly known as payau or payaw, alupayi or alopayi, salet, or tahig, among other names.

H. philippinensis is commonly grown as an ornamental plant. The petioles of the leaves have a sweet chewing gum scent when crushed. The leaves are used in Philippine folk medicine and for wrapping food in Philippine cuisine.
