= Thomas Croat =

American botanist

Thomas Bernard Croat (born 23 May 1938 in St. Marys, Iowa) is an American botanist and plant collector, noteworthy as one of botanical history's "most prolific plant collectors". He has collected and described numerous species of plants, particularly in the family Araceae, in his career at the Missouri Botanical Garden.

== Biography ==
After serving for about two years in 1956–1958 as a radar technician in the U.S. Army, Croat matriculated at Simpson College, where he graduated in 1962 with a B.A., majoring in botany and minoring in chemistry. He then matriculated at the University of Kansas, where he graduated in 1967 with a Ph.D. in botany. His thesis is entitled "The genus Solidago of the north central Great Plains".

At the Missouri Botanical Garden, Croat was from 1967 to 1971 an assistant botanist, from 1971 to 1976 a curator of phanerogams, from 1976 to 1977 and an associate curator. There he is since 1977 the P. A. Schulze Curator of Botany. From 1967 to 1971 he studied the flora of Panama with the sponsorship of the Missouri Botanical Garden and the Smithsonian Tropical Research Institute. From 1970 to 1971 he was a curator at the Summit Herbarium and Library in the Canal Zone. He has held adjunct faculty appointments at Washington University in St. Louis, at the University of Missouri–St. Louis, and at Saint Louis University. He was awarded the David Fairchild Medal for Plant Exploration in 2005.

Croat has collected botanical specimens in 39 different countries. He is a leading expert on aroids of the Neotropics.

His general interests are the systematics and ecology of Neotropical Araceae, floristics of Araceae and their horticulture. Among ongoing projects are dealing with Araceae for the floras of Mesoamerica, Ecuador, Guianas, Bolivia and areas of Colombia and monographs on Dieffenbachia, Rhodospatha, Homalomena and Chlorospatha. Croat collected his 100,000th specimen, the new species Anthurium centimillesimum, in 2007 in the cloud forest of Ecuador's Pichincha province. He has described 800 new species.

In 1965 he married Patricia Swope. They have two children.

== Selected publications ==
=== Articles ===
- Croat, Thomas B. (1969). "Seasonal Flowering Behavior in Central Panama". Annals of the Missouri Botanical Garden. 56 (3): 295–307. JSTOR 2394848.
- Croat, Thomas B. (1975). "Phenological Behavior of Habit and Habitat Classes on Barro Colorado Island (Panama Canal Zone)". Biotropica. 7 (4): 270–277. doi:10.2307/2989739. JSTOR 2989739.
- Croat, Thomas B. (1981). "A Revision of Syngonium (Araceae)". Annals of the Missouri Botanical Garden. 68 (4): 565–651. doi:10.2307/2398892. JSTOR 2398892.
- Croat, Thomas B. (1983). "A Revision of the Genus Anthurium (Araceae) of Mexico and Central America. Part I: Mexico and Middle America". Annals of the Missouri Botanical Garden. 70 (2): 211–416. doi:10.2307/2399049. JSTOR 2399049.
- Croat, Thomas B.; Sheffer, Richard D. (1983). "The sectional groupings of Anthurium (Araceae)" (PDF). Aroideana. 6 (3): 85–123.
- Croat, Thomas B. (1985). "Collecting and Preparing Specimens of Araceae". Annals of the Missouri Botanical Garden. 72 (2): 252–258. doi:10.2307/2399178. ISSN 0026-6493. JSTOR 2399178.
- Croat, Thomas B. (1992). "Species Diversity of Araceae in Colombia: A Preliminary Survey". Annals of the Missouri Botanical Garden. 79 (1): 17–28. doi:10.2307/2399806. JSTOR 2399806.
- Vargas, J. H.; Consiglio, T.; Jorgensen, P. M.; Croat, T. B. (2004). "Modelling distribution patterns in a species-rich plant genus, Anthurium (Araceae), in Ecuador". Diversity and Distributions. 10 (3): 211–216. doi:10.1111/j.1366-9516.2004.00081.x. S2CID 14024011.
- Mateo, Rubén G.; Croat, Thomas B.; Felicísimo, Ángel M.; Muñoz, Jesús (2010). "Profile or group discriminative techniques? Generating reliable species distribution models using pseudo-absences and target-group absences from natural history collections". Diversity and Distributions. 16: 84–94. doi:10.1111/j.1472-4642.2009.00617.x. S2CID 55341477.
- Henriquez, Claudia L.; Arias, Tatiana; Pires, J. Chris; Croat, Thomas B.; Schaal, Barbara A. (2014). "Phylogenomics of the plant family Araceae". Molecular Phylogenetics and Evolution. 75: 91–102. doi:10.1016/j.ympev.2014.02.017. PMID 24594061.

=== Books ===
- Croat, Thomas B. (1978). Flora of Barro Colorado Island. Stanford University Press. ISBN 9780804709507.
- Croat, Thomas B. (1986). A Revision of the Genus Anthurium (Araceae) of Mexico and Central America: Part II, Panama.
- Croat, Thomas B. (1991). A Revision of Anthurium, Section Pachyneurium (Araceae).
- Croat, Thomas B. (2015). A Revision of the Genus Chlorospatha (Araceae).
