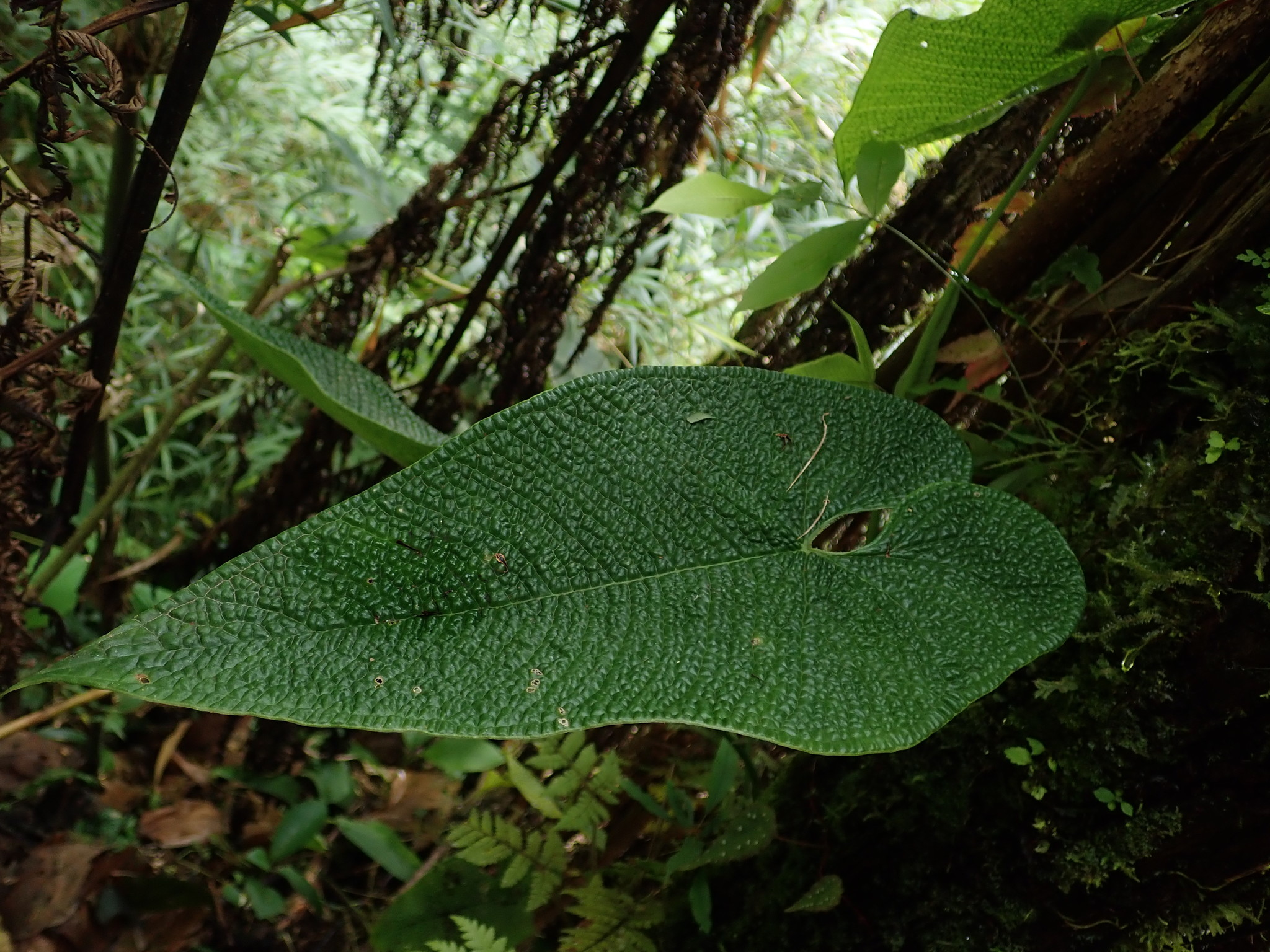
- A. corrugatum growing in Ecuador

Scientific classification
- Kingdom: Plantae
- Clade: Tracheophytes
- Clade: Angiosperms
- Clade: Monocots
- Order: Alismatales
- Family: Araceae
- Genus: Anthurium
- Species: A. corrugatum

Binomial name
- Anthurium corrugatum Sodiro

= Anthurium corrugatum =

Species of plant

Anthurium corrugatum is a species of plant in the genus Anthurium native to Central and South America from Panama to Ecuador. This species is noted for its cordate leaves with a network of fine veins that gives it a bullate appearance. A terrestrial grower, it is adapted to cool, humid climates. It is a member of the section Polyneurium along with Anthurium argyrostachyum and others.
