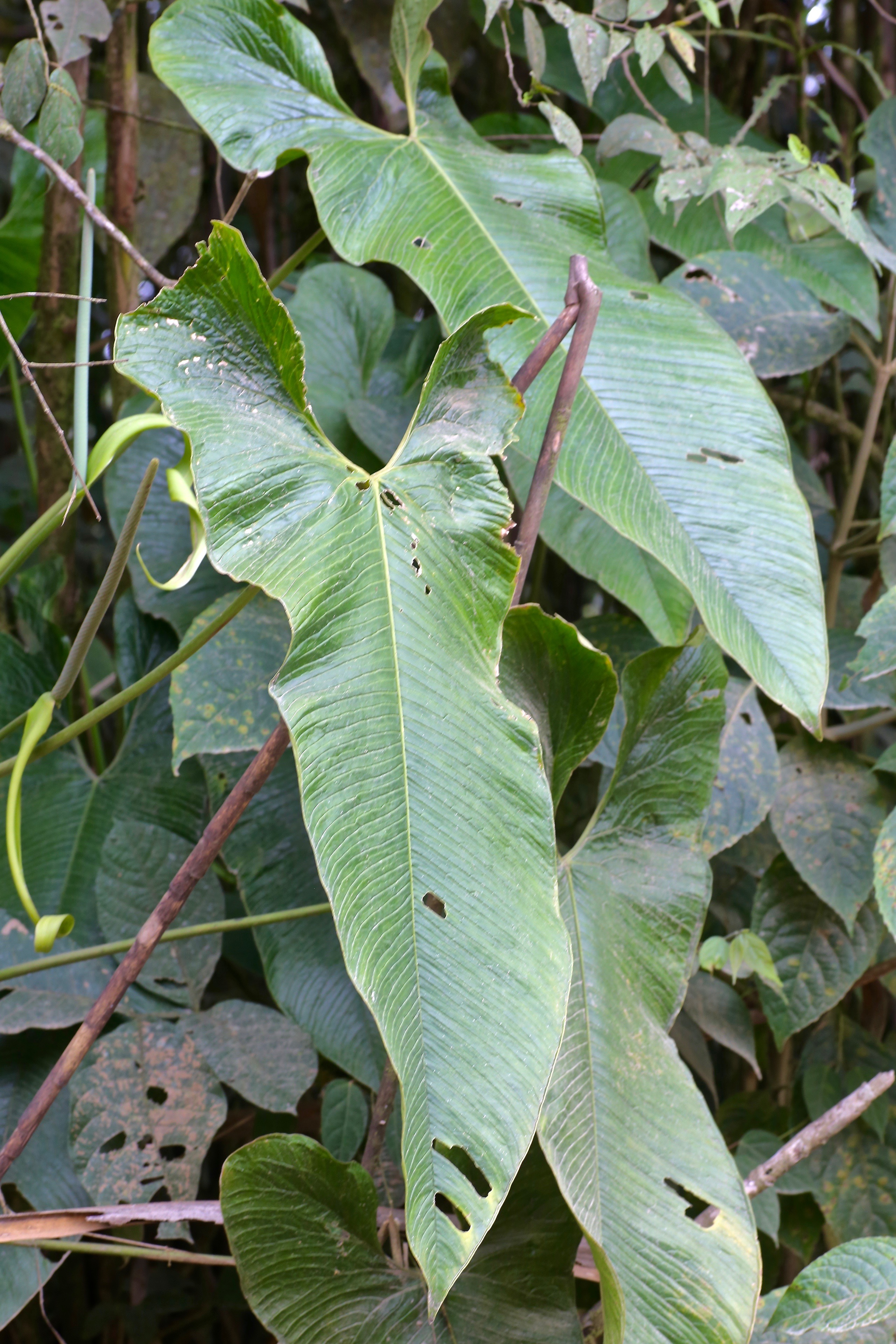

Scientific classification
- Kingdom: Plantae
- Clade: Tracheophytes
- Clade: Angiosperms
- Clade: Monocots
- Order: Alismatales
- Family: Araceae
- Genus: Anthurium
- Species: A. argyrostachyum

Binomial name
- Anthurium argyrostachyum Sodiro

Synonyms
- Anthurium pandurifolium

= Anthurium argyrostachyum =

Species of plant

Anthurium argyrostachyum is a species of plant in the genus Anthurium native to Ecuador and Colombia. Growing as a small shrub or an epiphyte, it is best recognized by its foliage that has triangular or arrowhead-like shape, a long central lobe, and parallel veins. It is a member of the section Polyneurium, and is thus related to Anthurium corrugatum, Anthurium panduriforme, and others that share its parallel venation and other characteristics.
