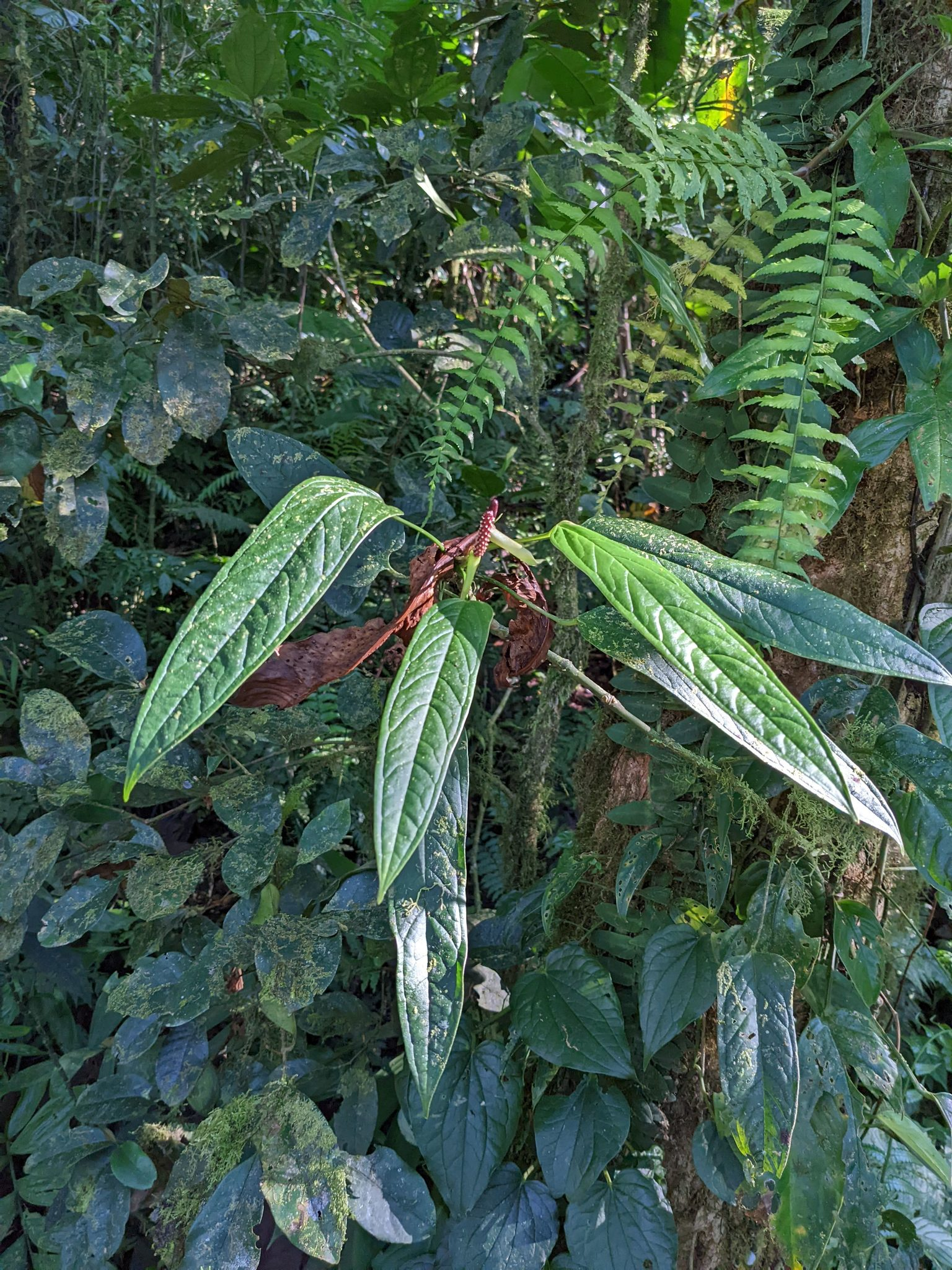

Scientific classification
- Kingdom: Plantae
- Clade: Tracheophytes
- Clade: Angiosperms
- Clade: Monocots
- Order: Alismatales
- Family: Araceae
- Genus: Anthurium
- Species: A. microspadix

Binomial name
- Anthurium microspadix Schott

= Anthurium microspadix =

Species of plant

Anthurium microspadix is a species of plant in the genus Anthurium. Growing as an epiphyte or a terrestrial shrub, it is native from the southern Mexican states of Oaxaca and Chiapas to Bolivia from 800–2,300 metres (2,600–7,500 ft) in elevation. One of the more widely distributed and variable species in its genus, it is easily confused with species such as Anthurium pallens and others.
