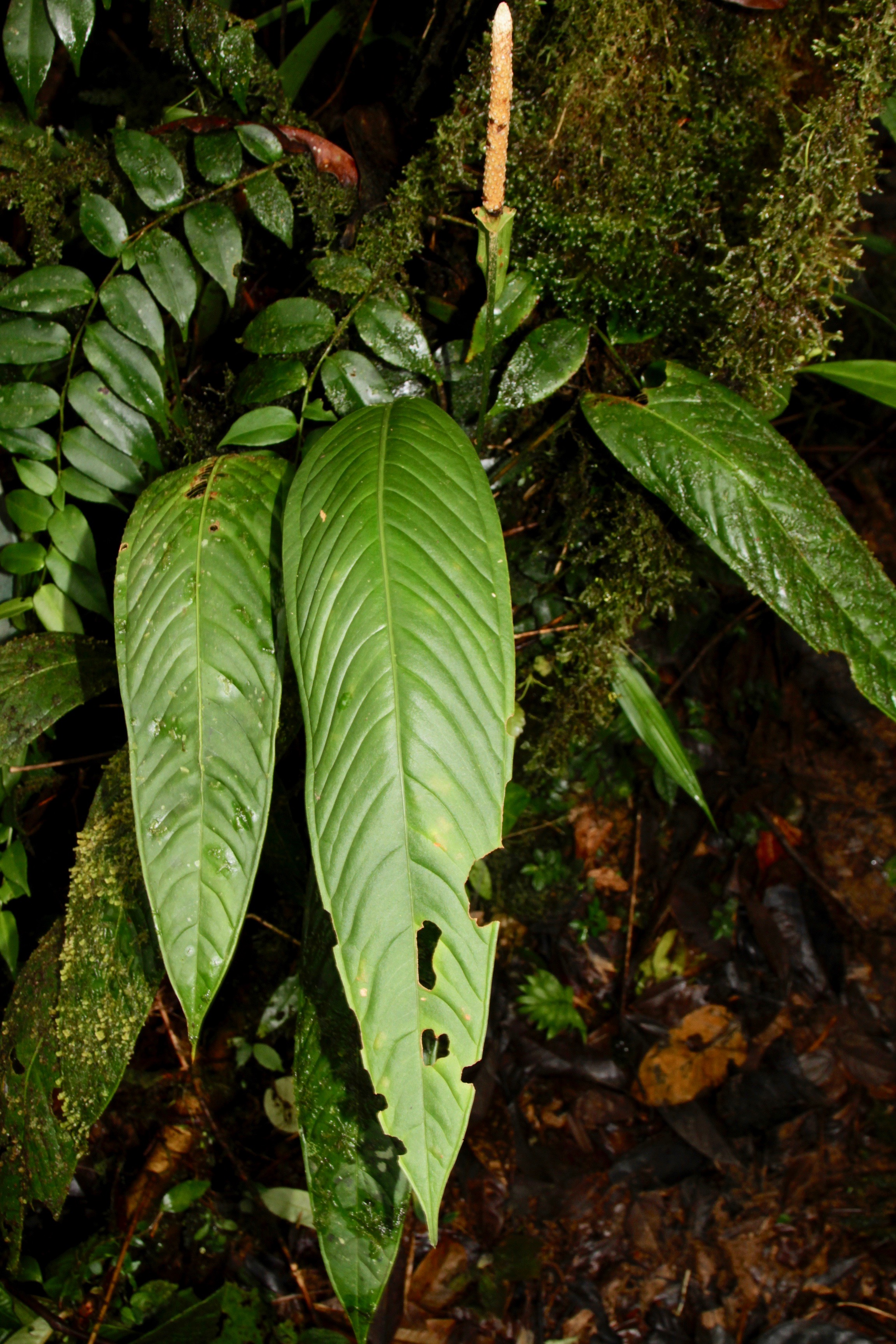

Scientific classification
- Kingdom: Plantae
- Clade: Tracheophytes
- Clade: Angiosperms
- Clade: Monocots
- Order: Alismatales
- Family: Araceae
- Genus: Anthurium
- Species: A. pallens

Binomial name
- Anthurium pallens Schott

= Anthurium pallens =

Species of plant

Anthurium pallens is a species of plant in the genus Anthurium. Growing as a climbing epiphyte with short stems and usually pendent growth, it is native to Central America. Easily confused with other species such as Anthurium microspadix, it can be distinguished by its typically shorter branches and leaf blades acute to rounded at the base.
