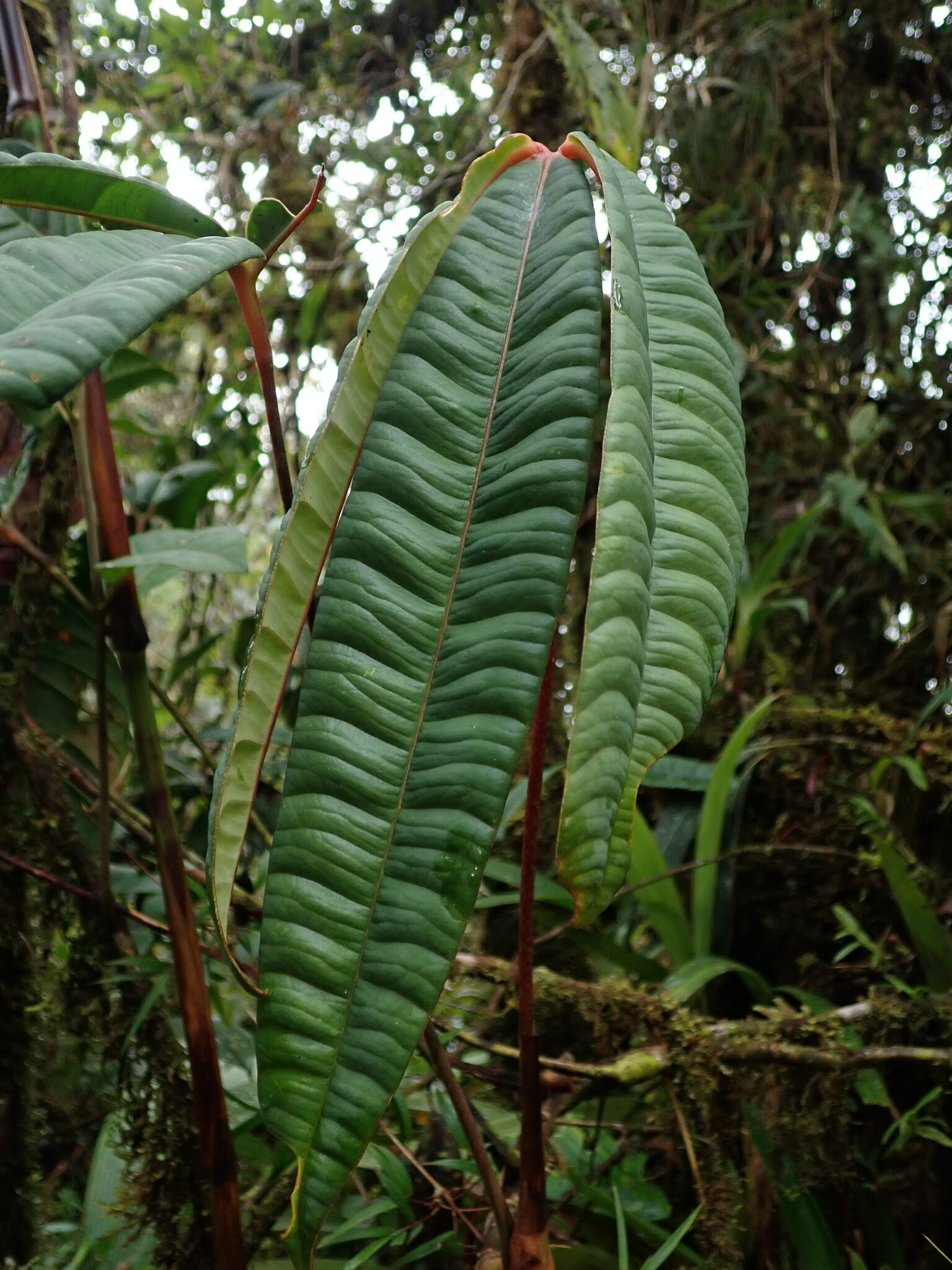

Conservation status
- Endangered (IUCN 3.1)

Scientific classification
- Kingdom: Plantae
- Clade: Tracheophytes
- Clade: Angiosperms
- Clade: Monocots
- Order: Alismatales
- Family: Araceae
- Genus: Anthurium
- Species: A. cutucuense

Binomial name
- Anthurium cutucuense Madison

= Anthurium cutucuense =

Species of plant

Anthurium cutucuense is an endangered species of plant in the genus Anthurium endemic to Ecuador. It is an epiphytic subshrub which grows in the cloud forests of the lower Andes. The species is named after the Cordillera de Cutucú mountain range where it was first collected. Its most distinctive feature is tri-lobed leaves which have a bullate texture and a red midrib.
