= List of Araceae genera =

This is a list of genera in the plant family Araceae. As currently circumscribed, the family contains over 3700 species into approximately a hundred genera. The family's taxonomy remains in flux, and a full taxonomic treatment integrating the mass of phylogenetic data that has become available in the last 10 years remain to be produced. The classification presented here is informed by the review of Mayo et al. (2013). As of November 2025, Plants of the World Online accepts 150 species.

== Genera ==
Genus Authority	Year (Note: A second date given in parentheses indicate the printed date on the work, when that date differs from the actual date of publication. This may occur because the work was distributed at a different date, or because a book was printed in multiple issues bound together at a later date.)	Classification	Type species	# of species	Distribution
Gymnostachys; R.Br.	1810	Gymnostachydoideae	Gymnostachys anceps R.Br.	1	Eastern Australia
Lysichiton (Note: Although Schott's original publication used both Lysichiton and Lysichitum his later publications used only the former name.); Schott	1857	Orontioideae	Lysichiton camtschatcensis (L.) Schott	2	Temperate East Asia to Western United States
Orontium; L.	1753	Orontioideae	Orontium aquaticum L.	1	Eastern United States to Texas
Symplocarpus; Salisb. ex W.P.C.Barton (Note: Since Barton himself credits Nuttall in following Salisbury's (1812, Trans. Hortic. Soc. Lond. 1:267) invalid name, some attribute authorship to that author instead (either in Barton or in Gen. N. Amer. Pl. 1:105, 1818))	1817	Orontioideae	Symplocarpus foetidus (L.) Salisb. ex W.P.C.Barton	5	Temperate East Asia and North America
Lemna; L.	1753	Lemnoideae	Lemna minor L.	c. 13	Cosmopolitan
Spirodela; Schleid.	1839	Lemnoideae	Spirodela polyrrhiza (L.) Schleid.	3	Cosmopolitan
Wolffia; Horkel ex Schleid. (Note: Although Schleiden originally published the genus in an earlier version of that paper, he originally only included one species, W. delilei (≡ Wolffiella hyalina (Delile) Monod). That species was later moved out of Wolffia and into Wolffiella, overlooking that it was already the type of the former name. By the time the problem was noticed in the mid-20th century, Wolffia would have replaced Wolffiella, and the former Wolffia would have had to become Grantia (den Hartog, 1969, Taxon 18(5):591-592), which would have resulted in "intolerable confusion" (McVaugh, 1971, Taxon 20(2-3):384-389) as most of the species of the then Lemnaceae changed genera (two of which similar in name), and so the name was conserved (McVaugh, 1971) with a later date of publication allowing for a valid lectotype to be chosen.)	1844	Lemnoideae	Wolffia michelii (Note: Schleiden's species is an illegitimate renaming of Linnaeus' Lemna arrhiza and is properly called Wolffia arrhiza (L.) Horkel ex Wimm.); Schleid.	ca. 10	Cosmopolitan
Wolffiella (Hegelm.) Hegelm.	1895 ("1896")	Lemnoideae	Wolffiella oblonga (Phil.) Hegelm.	ca. 10	New World, Africa, Arabian Peninsula
Anthurium; Schott	1829	Pothoideae	Anthurium acaule (Jacq.) Schott	over 1000	Central and South America, Caribbean
Pothoidium; Schott	1857	Pothoideae	Pothoidium lobbianum Schott	1	Taiwan, Moluccas, Sulawesi, Philippines
Pothos; L.	1753	Pothoideae	Pothos scandens L.	55+	Tropical Asia and Pacific
Alloschemone; Schott	1858	Monsteroideae	Alloschemone poeppigiana (Note: An illegitimate new name for Eduard Poeppig's Scindapsus occidentalis. The species' correct name is Alloschemone occidentalis (Poepp.) Engl. & K.Krause.); Schott	2	Bolivia and Northern Brazil
Amydrium; Schott	1863	Monsteroideae	Amydrium humile Schott	5	Indochina to New Guinea
Anadendrum; Schott	1857	Monsteroideae	Anadendrum montanum Schott	12	Southern China to Malesia
Epipremnum; Schott	1857	Monsteroideae	Epipremnum mirabile Schott	ca. 15	Tropical and subtropical Asia to Pacific Islands
Heteropsis; Kunth	1841	Monsteroideae	Heteropsis salicifolia Kunth	17	Costa Rica to tropical South America
Holochlamys; Engl.	1883 ("1882")	Monsteroideae	Holochlamys beccarii (Engl.) Engl.	1	New Guinea
Monstera; Adans.	1763	Monsteroideae	Monstera adansonii (Note: Although Adanson originally called the species Dracontium pertusum, the combination Monstera pertusa was assigned by Schott (1830, Wiener Z. Kunst 4:1028), the first author to accept Adanson's genus and create combinations in it, to Pothos pertusum Roxb. (currently known as Rhaphidophora pertusa (Roxb.) Schott).); Schott	ca. 60	Continental Neotropics
Rhaphidophora; Hassk.	1842	Monsteroideae	Rhaphidophora pertusa (Roxb.) Schott)	ca. 100	Africa to Australasia
Rhodospatha; Poepp.	1845	Monsteroideae	Rhodospatha latifolia Poepp.	15	Continental Neotropics
Scindapsus; Schott	1832	Monsteroideae	Scindapsus officinalis (Roxb.) Schott	35	Subtropical Asia to northern Australia
Spathiphyllum; Schott	1832	Monsteroideae	Spathiphyllum lanceifolium (Jacq.) Schott	40	Malesia, Central and South America
Stenospermation; Schott	1858	Monsteroideae	Stenospermation mathewsii Schott	50+	Continental Neotropics
Anaphyllopsis; A.Hay	1989 ("1988")	Lasioideae	Anaphyllopsis americana (Engler) A.Hay	3	Tropical South America
Anaphyllum; Schott	1857 (Note: Some sources cite Gen. Aroid.:pl. 83 (1858), but there is no reason to believe that the May issue of Bonplandia, which Schott himself cite as the place of publication in Genera Aroidearum Exposita was published with that much delay.)	Lasioideae	Anaphyllum wightii Schott	2	India
Cyrtosperma; Griff.	1851	Lasioideae	Cyrtosperma lasioides (Note: Treated now as Cyrtosperma merkusii (Hassk.) Schott.); Griff.	ca. 12	Malesia and Pacific islands
Dracontioides; Engl.	1911	Lasioideae	Dracontioides desciscens Engl.	2	Eastern Brazil
Dracontium; L.	1753	Lasioideae	Dracontium polyphyllum L.	24	Neotropical
Lasia; Lour.	1790	Lasioideae	Lasia aculeata (Note: The species is now known at Lasia spinosa (L.) Thwaites.); Lour.	2	Tropical Asia to New Guinea
Lasimorpha; Schott	1857	Lasioideae	Lasimorpha senegalensis Schott	1	Western and West-Central Africa
Podolasia; N.E.Br.	1882	Lasioideae	Podolasia stipitata N.E.Br.	1	Malay Archipelago
Pycnospatha; Thorel ex Gagnep.	1941	Lasioideae	Pycnospatha palmata Gagnep.	2	Indochina
Urospatha; Schott	1853 ("1857") (Note: The year when the work was completed.)	Lasioideae	Urospatha sagittifolia (Rudge) Schott	10+	Central and Southern America
Gonatopus; Hook.f. ex Engl.	1879	Zamioculcadoideae	Gonatopus boivinii (Decne.) Engl.	5	Africa
Zamioculcas; Schott		Zamioculcadoideae	Zamioculcas loddigesii (Note: The species, which is an illegitimate renaming of Loddiges' Calladium zamiifolium, is correctly known as Zamioculcas zamiifolia (G.Lodd.) Schott.); Schott	1	Tropical Eastern and Southern Africa.
Aglaodorum; Schott	1858	Aroideae; Aglaonemateae	Aglaodorum griffithii (Schott) Schott	1	Sundaland, southern Indochina
Aglaonema; Schott	1829	Aroideae; Aglaonemateae	Aglaonema oblongifolium (Note: The correct name is Aglaonema nitida (Jack) Kunth. Schott's original type species may have been meant to be a renaming of William Roxburgh's Calla oblongifolia (=Aglaonema marantifolia Blume), but Schott mistakenly cited only Heinrich Friedrich Link's Arum integrifolium as a synonym, rendering the type species' new name illegitimate; he would later (1832, Melet. Bot. 1:20) rename it Aglaonema integrifolium. (Nicolson, 1969, Smithsonian Contr. Bot. 1:5)); Schott	ca. 40	Southeast Asia
Aia; S.Y.Wong & P.C.Boyce	2024	Schismatoglottidoideae; Schismatoglottideae	Schismatoglottis tseui S.Y.Wong & P.C.Boyce	1	Borneo
Alocasia (Schott) G.Don	1839	Aroideae; Colocasieae	Alocasia cucullata (Lour.) G.Don	79	tropical Asia to Australia
Amorphophallus; Blume ex Decne.	1834	Aroideae; Thomsonieae	Amorphophallus campanulatus (Note: The species' name is illegitimate as it is based on the same type as Amorphophallus paeoniifolius (Dennst.) Nicolson, which is the correct name.); Blume ex Decne.	ca. 200	Paleotropical
Ambrosina; Bassi	1763	Aroideae; Ambrosineae	Ambrosina bassii L.	1	Tunisia, Algeria, Corsica, Sardinia, Sicily
Anchomanes; Schott	1853	Aroideae; Nephthytideae	Anchomanes hookeri (Note: This species is now treated as a synonym of Anchomanes difformis (Blume) Engl.) (Kunth) Schott	7 or 8	Tropical Africa
Anubias; Schott	1857	Aroideae; Anubiadeae	Anubias afzelii Schott	8	West Africa
Apoballis; Schott	2010	Schismatoglottidoideae; Schismatoglottideae	Apoballis neglecta (Note: Properly treated as Apoballis rupestris (Zoll. & Moritzi ex Zoll.) S.Y.Wong & P.C.Boyce.); Schott	12	Thailand to Malesia
Aridarum; Ridl.	1913	Schismatoglottidoideae; Schismatoglottideae	Aridarum montanum Ridl.	7	Borneo
Ariopsis; Nimmo	1839	Aroideae; Colocasieae	Ariopsis peltata Nimmo	2	Western Ghats, southeastern Himalaya
Arisaema; Mart.	1831	Aroideae; Arisaemateae	Unclear (Note: If the designation by Pfeiffer (1872, Nomencl. Bot. 1:265) is valid, the type is Arisaema speciosum, otherwise, the designation by Britton and Brown (1913, Ill. Fl. N.U.S., ed. 2. 1:442) of A. nepenthoideshas priority.)	ca. 150	Eastern and Central Africa, Asia and eastern North America
Arisarum; Mill.	1754	Aroideae; Arisareae	Arisarum vulgare Targ.Tozz.	3	Mediterranean area East to Caucasus
Arophyton; Jum.	1928	Aroideae; Arophyteae	Arophyton tripartitum Jum.	7	Northern Madagascar
Arum; L.	1753	Aroideae; Areae	Arum maculatum L.	ca. 25	Western Palearctic
Asterostigma; Fisch. & C.A.Mey.	1845	Aroideae; Spathicarpeae	Asterostigma langsdorffianum (Note: Although the original description included only this species, which is listed as type in Index Nominum Genericorum, the name is not included in any standard databases for unknown reasons.); Fisch. & C.A.Mey.	7	Northern South America
Ayuantha; S.Y.Wong & P.C.Boyce	2024	Schismatoglottidoideae; Schismatoglottideae	Schismatoglottis petri A.Hay	4	Borneo
Bakoa; P.C.Boyce & S.Y.Wong	2008	Schismatoglottidoideae; Schismatoglottideae	Bakoa lucens (Bogner) P.C.Boyce & S.Y.Wong	1	Borneo
Bau; S.Y.Wong & P.C.Boyce	2024	Schismatoglottidoideae; Schismatoglottideae	Schismatoglottis nervosa Ridl.	26	Borneo, Malaya, Sulawesi, Sumatra, and Thailand
Biarum; Schott	1832	Aroideae; Areae	Biarum tenuifolium (L.) Schott	ca. 23	Mediterranean
Bognera; Mayo & Nicolson	1984	Aroideae; Dieffenbachieae	Bognera recondita (Madison) Mayo & Nicolson	1	Brazil
Borneoa; S.Y.Wong & P.C.Boyce	2024	Schismatoglottidoideae; Schismatoglottideae	Schismatoglottis asperata Engl.	22	Borneo and Malaya
Bucephalandra; Schott	1858	Schismatoglottidoideae; Schismatoglottideae	Bucephalandra motleyana Scott	5 (Note: This number does not account for many more species that remain undescribed or untransferred from original placement in the discredited Microcasia (Boyce & Yeng 2013; Webbia 67(2):139-146).)	Borneo
Caladium; Vent.	1801 ("1800")	Aroideae; Caladieae	Caladium bicolor (Aiton Vent.)	7	Tropical South America
Calla; L.	1753	Aroideae; Calleae (Note: This species was until recently placed in its own subfamily, which was found (Cabrera et al. 2008; Am. J. Bot. 95(9)1153-1165:1160) to be nested within Aroideae. A new, comprehensive taxonomy of the family remains to be published, but Cabrera and al. characterized the demoting of the subfamily back to tribal status as the most sensible option.)	Calla palustris L.	1	Temperate Northern Hemisphere
Callopsis; Engl.	1895	Aroideae; Callopsideae	Callopsis volkensii Endl.	1	Tanzania and Kenya
Carlephyton; Jum.	1919	Aroideae; Arophyteae	Carlephyton madagascariense Jum.	3	Madagascar
Cercestis; Schott	1857	Aroideae; Culcasieae	Cercestis afzelii Schott	10	Tropical Africa
Chlorospatha; Engl.	1878	Aroideae; Caladieae	Chlorospatha kolbii Engl.	ca. 16	Costa Rica to Peru
Colletogyne; Buchet	1939	Aroideae; Arophyteae	Colletogyne perrieri Buchet	1	Madagascar
Colocasia; Schott	1832	Aroideae; Colocasieae	Colocasia antiquorum Schott	at least 25	tropical Polynesia and Southeast Asia
Croatiella; E.G.Gonç.	2005	Aroideae; Spathicarpeae	Croatiella integrifolia (Madison) E.G.Gonç.	1	Eastern Ecuador
Cryptocoryne; Fisch. ex Wydler	1830	Schismatoglottidoideae; Cryptocoryneae	Cryptocoryne spiralis (Retz.) Fisch. ex Wydler	50 to 60	Tropical Asia and New Guinea
Culcasia; P.Beauv.	1803 (Note: A first part comprising 10 pages and 6 plates was issued in quarto format in 1803, but this edition was abandoned, and the more common folio edition began publication 2 years later.) ("1805")	Aroideae; Culcasieae	Culcasia scandens P.Beauv.	ca. 30	Africa
Dieffenbachia; Schott	1829	Aroideae; Dieffenbachieae	Dieffenbachia seguine (Jacq.) Schott	56	Neotropical
Dracunculus; Mill.	1754	Aroideae; Areae	Dracunculus vulgaris Schott	3	Circummediterranean
Eminium (Blume) Schott	1856 (Note: IPNI and ING gives a part of Schott's Aroideae issued in 1855 as the place of publication, but the premier monograph gives the 1856 publication, which is the only one that could be verified.)	Aroideae; Areae	Eminium spiculatum (Blume) Schott	9	Turkey and Middle East to Central Asia
Filarum; Nicolson	1968	Aroideae; Caladieae	Filarum manserichense Nicolson	1	Peru
Furtadoa; M. Hotta	1981	Aroideae; Homalomeneae	Furtadoa sumatrensis M.Hotta	2	Sumatra and Malaysia
Gearum; N.E.Br.	1882	Aroideae; Spathicarpeae	Gearum brasiliense N.E.Br.	1 or 2	Western Brazil
Gorgonidium; Schott	1864 ("1863-1864")	Aroideae; Spathicarpeae	Gorgonidium mirabile Schott	8	Peru to Argentina
Hapaline; Schott (Note: Schott originally published the genus the year before(Oesterr. Bot. Wochenbl. 7:85) as Hapale, but then chose to alter the name as it was homonymous with a now disused genus of marmosets. This new name was later conserved (Brummitt 1984; Taxon 33(4):707) over the original form.)	1858	Aroideae; Caladieae	Hapaline benthamiana (Schott) Schott	8	Southeast Asia to Malesia
Helicodiceros; Schott	1855 (Note: Multiple sources give the year of publication as 1853 (Oesterr. Bot. Wochenbl. 3:369), but Schott merely notes after describing his Dracunculus crinita that "a genus Helicodiceros will probably be justified" ("Eine Gattung «Helicodiceros» dürfte hierdurch begründet werden."), which fails to satisfy the requirement of the ICN's article 36.1 (see also Rickett and Stafleu, 1959, Taxon 8(7):231).)	Aroideae; Areae	Helicodiceros muscivorus (L.f.) Engl.	1	Balearic islands, Corsica, Sardinia
Vesta; S.Y.Wong	2018	Schismatoglottidoideae; Schismatoglottideae	Vesta longifolia (Ridl.) S.Y.Wong	1	Peninsular Malaysia and Borneo
Homalomena; Schott	1832	Aroideae; Homalomeneae	Homalomena cordata Schott	80+	Tropical Asia, Malesia, Papuasia, parts of the Neotropics
Ibania; S.Y.Wong & P.C.Boyce	2024	Schismatoglottidoideae; Schismatoglottideae	Schismatoglottis smaragdina S.Y.Wong, Aisahtul & P.C.Boyce	12	Borneo
Incarum; E.G.Gonç.	2005	Aroideae; Spathicarpeae	Incarum pavonii (Schott) E.G.Gonç.	1	Central Andes
Jasarum; G.S.Bunting	1977 ("1975")	Aroideae; Caladieae	Jasarum steyermarkii G.S.Bunting	1	Guyana and Venezuela
Lagenandra; Dalzell	1852	Schismatoglottidoideae; Cryptocoryneae	Lagenandra toxicaria Dalzell	16	India, Bangladesh and Sri Lanka
Lorenzia; E.G.Gonç.	2012	Aroideae; Spathicarpeae	Lorenzia umbrosa E.G.Gonç.	1	Amapá, Brazil
Mangonia; Schott	1857	Aroideae; Spathicarpeae	Mangonia tweedieana Schott	2	southern Brazil to Uruguay
Montrichardia; Crueg.	1854	Aroideae; Montrichardieae	Montrichardia aculeatum (Note: The species' correct name is Montrichardia arborescens (L.) Schott) (G.Mey.) Crueg.	2+1 fossil	Neotropical
Nephthytis; Schott	1857	Aroideae; Nephthytideae	Nephthytis afzellii Schott	6	tropical western Africa
Ooia; S.Y.Wong & P.C.Boyce	2010	Schismatoglottidoideae; Schismatoglottideae	Ooia grabowskii (Engl.) S.Y.Wong & P.C.Boyce	2	Borneo
Peltandra; Raf.	1819	Aroideae; Peltandreae	Peltandra undulata (Note: Treated as a synonym of Peltandra virginica (L.) Schott); Schott	2	Eastern North America and Cuba
Philodendron; Schott	1829	Aroideae; Philodendreae	Philodendron grandifolium (Jacq.) Schott	at least 350	Tropical Americas
Philonotion; Schott	1829	Aroideae; Philonotieae	Philonotion spruceanum Schott	3	Neotropics
Phyllotaenium; André	1872	Aroideae; Caladieae	Phyllotaenium lindenii André	1	Colombia and Panama
Phymatarum; M.Hotta	1965	Schismatoglottidoideae; Schismatoglottideae	Phymatarum borneense M.Hotta	1	Borneo
Pinellia; Ten.	1839	Aroideae; Arisaemateae	Pinellia tuberifera (Note: Tenore's name was an unnecessary renaming of Thunberg's earlier Arum ternatum. The correct name for the species is Pinellia ternata (Thunb.) Makino.); Ten.	9	East Asia
Piptospatha; N.E.Br.	1879	Schismatoglottidoideae; Schismatoglottideae	Piptospatha insignis N.E.Br.	12	Thailand to Borneo
Pistia; L.	1753	Aroideae; Pistieae	Pistia stratiotes L.	1	Likely pantropical
Protarum; Engl.	1901	Aroideae; Colocasieae	Protarum sechellarum Engl.	1	Seychelles
Pseudohydrosme; Engl.	1892 ("1893")	Aroideae; Nephthytideae	Pseudrohydrosme gabunensis Engl.	2	Gabon
Pursegloveia; S.Y.Wong, S.L.Low & P.C.Boyce	2018	Schismatoglottidoideae; Schismatoglottideae		7	Borneo
Remusatia; Schott	1832	Aroideae; Colocasieae	Remusatia vivipara (Roxb.) Schott	4	Tropical and Subtropical Old World
Sarawakia; S.Y.Wong & P.C.Boyce	2024	Schismatoglottidoideae; Schismatoglottideae	Schismatoglottis clausula S.Y.Wong	5	Borneo
Sauromatum; Schott	1832	Aroideae; Areae	Sauromatum guttatum (Note: Now known as Sauromatum venosum (Dryand. ex Aiton) Kunth.) (Wall.) Schott	9	Tropical Eurasia to North China
Scaphispatha; Brongn. ex Schott	1860	Aroideae; Caladieae	Scaphispatha gracilis Brongn. ex Schott	2	Bolivia and Brazil
Schismatoglottis; Zoll. & Moritzi	1846 (Note: Due to confusion with a later, similarly titled work by Zollinger which has the same standardised abbreviation, some sources erroneously give 1854 as the date of publication.)	Schismatoglottidoideae; Schismatoglottideae	Schismatoglottis calyptrata (Roxb.) Zoll. & Moritzi	97	Subtropical Asia to Pacific islands
Schottarum; P.C.Boyce & S.Y.Wong	2008	Schismatoglottidoideae; Schismatoglottideae	Schottarum sarikeense (Bogner & M.Hotta) P.C.Boyce & S.Y.Wong	2	Borneo
Schottariella; P.C.Boyce & S.Y.Wong	2009	Schismatoglottidoideae; Schismatoglottideae	Schottariella mirifica P.C.Boyce & S.Y.Wong	1	Borneo
Spathantheum; Schott	1859	Aroideae; Spathicarpeae	Spathantheum orbignyanum Schott	2	Andes from Peru to Northern Argentina
Spathicarpa; Hook.	1831	Aroideae; Spathicarpeae	Spathicarpa hastifolia Hook.	4	Southern tropical America
Steudnera; K.Koch	1862	Aroideae; Colocasieae	Steudnera colocasiifolia K.Koch	10	Assam, Indochina, South China
Stylochaeton; Lepr.	1834	Aroideae; Stylochaetoneae	Stylochaeton hypogeum Lepr.	ca. 20	Africa
Synandrospadix; Engl.	1883	Aroideae; Spathicarpeae	Synandrospadix vermitoxicus (Griseb.) Engl.	1	Peru to northern Argentina
Syngonium; Schott	1829	Aroideae; Caladieae	Syngonium auritum (L.) Schott	ca. 35	Neotropical
Taccarum; Brongn. (Note: Properly attributed to Brongniart in Schott (who says he is quoting Brongniart's description from a letter without adding any details of his own: "Wir bringen nachstehend den uns vom Autor überlassenen Gattungskarakter dar, indem wir uns nicht erlauben, demselben Eigenes anzufügen."), not Brongniart ex Schott, and not cited to Gen. Aroid.:pl. 65 (1858).)	1858 ("1857")	Aroideae; Spathicarpeae	Taccarum weddellianum Brongn.	6	South America
Theriophonum; Blume	1837 ("1835")	Aroideae; Areae	Theriophonum crenatum (Note: Now known as Theriophonum minutum (Willd.) Baill.) (Wight) Schott	7	
Tweeddalea; S.Y.Wong & P.C.Boyce	2024	Schismatoglottidoideae; Schismatoglottideae	Schismatoglottis multiflora Ridl.	14	Borneo
Typhonium; Schott	1829	Aroideae; Areae	Typhonium trilobatum (L.) Schott	ca. 50	Mongolia to Australia
Typhonodorum; Schott	1857	Aroideae; Peltandreae	Typhonodorum lindleyanum Schott	1	Madagascar, Zanzibar, Mauritius and Comoros
Ulearum; Engl.	1905 ("1906")	Aroideae; Caladieae	Ulearum sagittatum Engl.	2	Peru, northern Brazil
Vivaria; Cabrera, Tinitana, Cumbicus, Prina & Paulo Herrera	2022		Vivaria calvasensis Cabrera, Tinitana, Cumbicus, Prina & Paulo Herrera	1	Ecuador
Xanthosoma; Schott	1832	Aroideae; Caladieae	Xanthosoma sagittifolium (L.) Schott	ca. 50	Neotropical
Zantedeschia; Spreng.	1826	Aroideae; Zantedeschieae	Zantedeschia aethiopica (L.) Spreng.	8	Southern Africa
Zomicarpa; Schott	1856	Aroideae; Caladieae	Zomicarpa pythonium (Mart.) Schott	2	North-eastern Brazil
Zomicarpella; N.E.Br.	1881	Aroideae; Caladieae	Zomicarpella maculata N.E.Br.	2	Colombia
Adelonema; Schott	1860	Aroideae; Philodendreae		16	tropical Central and South America
Bakoaella; S.Y.Wong & P.C.Boyce	2018	Schismatoglottidoideae; Schismatoglottideae	Bakoaella nakamotoi (S.Y.Wong) S.W.Wong & P.C.Boyce	2	Borneo
Bidayuha; S.Y.Wong & P.C.Boyce	2018		Bidayuha crassispatha S.Y.Wong & P.C.Boyce	1	Borneo
Boycea; A.Hay	2022		Boycea bintuluensis (A.Hay, Bogner & P.C.Boyce) A.Hay	1	Borneo
Burttianthus; S.Y.Wong, S.L.Low & P.C.Boyce	2018	Schismatoglottidoideae; Schismatoglottideae	Burttianthus caulescens (M.Hotta) S.Y.Wong & P.C.Boyce	9	Borneo
Colobogynium; Schott	1865		Colobogynium variegatum (Hook. ex Veitch) S.Y.Wong, A.Hay & P.C.Boyce	1	Borneo and Sumatra
Englerarum; Nauheimer & P.C.Boyce	2013	Aroideae; Colocasieae	Englerarum montanum (Roxb.) P.C.Boyce, K.Z.Hein & A.Hay	1	Indochina and south-central China
Fenestratarum; P.C.Boyce & S.Y.Wong	2014	Schismatoglottidoideae; Schismatoglottideae	Fenestratarum culum P.C.Boyce & S.Y.Wong	2	Borneo
Galantharum; P.C.Boyce & S.Y.Wong	2015	Schismatoglottidoideae; Schismatoglottideae	Galantharum kishii P.C.Boyce & S.Y.Wong	1	Borneo
Gamogyne; N.E.Br.	1882	Schismatoglottidoideae; Schismatoglottideae		6	Borneo
Gosong; S.Y.Wong & P.C.Boyce	2018	Schismatoglottidoideae; Schismatoglottideae	Gosong brevipedunculata (H.Okada & Y.Mori) S.Y.Wong & P.C.Boyce	6	Borneo
Hera; S.Y.Wong, S.L.Low & P.C.Boyce	2018	Schismatoglottidoideae; Schismatoglottideae	Hera hebe (S.Y.Wong, S.L.Low & P.C.Boyce) S.Y.Wong & P.C.Boyce	6	Borneo
Heteroaridarum; M.Hotta	1976	Schismatoglottidoideae; Schismatoglottideae		3	Borneo
Hottarum; Bogner & Nicolson	1978	Schismatoglottidoideae; Schismatoglottideae	Hottarum truncatum (M.Hotta) Bogner & Nicolson	1	Borneo
Idimanthus; E.G.Gonç.	2018		Idimanthus amorphophalloides E.G.Gonç.	1	southeastern Brazil
Josefia; Scherber., K.Hase & P.C.Boyce	2023		Josefia intricata Scherber., Wongso & K.Hase	1	Borneo
Kiewia; S.Y.Wong & P.C.Boyce	2018	Schismatoglottidoideae; Schismatoglottideae		3	Peninsular Thailand, Peninsular Malaysia, and Sumatra
Lazarum; A.Hay	1992	Aroideae; Areae		16	southern New Guinea and northern and eastern Australia
Leucocasia; Schott	1857	Aroideae; Colocasieae	Leucocasia gigantea (Blume) Schott	1	Borneo
Nabalu; S.Y.Wong & P.C.Boyce	2018	Schismatoglottidoideae; Schismatoglottideae	Nabalu corneri (A.Hay) S.Y.Wong & P.C.Boyce	1	Borneo
Naiadia; S.Y.Wong, S.L.Low & P.C.Boyce	2018	Schismatoglottidoideae; Schismatoglottideae	Naiadia zygoseta (S.Y.Wong, S.L.Low & P.C.Boyce) S.Y.Wong & P.C.Boyce	1	Borneo
Pichinia; S.Y.Wong & P.C.Boyce	2010	Schismatoglottidoideae; Schismatoglottideae	Pichinia disticha S.Y.Wong & P.C.Boyce	1	Borneo
Rhynchopyle; Engl.	1880	Schismatoglottidoideae; Schismatoglottideae		7	Borneo
Tawaia; S.Y.Wong, S.L.Low & P.C.Boyce	2018	Schismatoglottidoideae; Schismatoglottideae	Tawaia sabahensis (S.Y.Wong, S.L.Low & P.C.Boyce) S.Y.Wong & P.C.Boyce	1	Borneo
Toga; S.Y.Wong, S.L.Low & P.C.Boyce	2018	Schismatoglottidoideae; Schismatoglottideae	Toga rostrata (Bogner & A.Hay) S.Y.Wong & P.C.Boyce	6	Borneo
Vietnamocasia; N.S.Lý, S.Y.Wong & P.C.Boyce	2017	Aroideae; Colocasieae	Vietnamocasia dauae N.S.Lý, Haev., S.Y.Wong & V.D.Nguyen	1	Vietnam
†Cobbania (Lesq.) Stockey, G.W. Rothwell, K.R. Johnson	2007		†Cobbania corrugata (Lesq.) Stockey, G.W. Rothwell, K.R. Johnson	2	Alberta, Canada

== Taxonomy ==
=== Bogner & Nicolson (1991) ===
The following is Bogner & Nicolson's (1991) classification of Araceae as cited in Mayo et al. (1997).

Araceae

- Subfamily Gymnostachydoideae
  - Gymnostachys
- Subfamily Pothoideae
  - Pothos
  - Pedicellarum
  - Pothoidium
- Subfamily Monsteroideae
  - Tribe Anadendreae
    - Anadendrum
  - Tribe Monstereae
    - Amydrium
    - Rhaphidophora
    - Epipremnum
    - Scindapsus
    - Alloschemone
    - Stenospermation
    - Rhodospatha
    - Monstera
  - Tribe Heteropsideae
    - Heteropsis
  - Tribe Spathiphylleae
    - Spathiphyllum
    - Holochlamys
- Subfamily Calloideae
  - Calla
- Subfamily Lasioideae
  - Tribe Orontieae
    - Lysichiton
    - Symplocarpus
    - Orontium
  - Tribe Anthurieae
    - Anthurium
  - Tribe Lasieae
    - Subtribe Dracontiinae
      - Cyrtosperma
      - Lasimorpha
      - Lasia
      - Anaphyllum
      - Anaphyllopsis
      - Podolasia
      - Urospatha
      - Dracontioides
      - Dracontium
    - Subtribe Pycnospathinae
      - Pycnospatha
  - Tribe Zamioculcadeae
    - Zamioculcas
    - Gonatopus
  - Tribe Callopsideae
    - Callopsis
  - Tribe Nephthytideae
    - Pseudohydrosme
    - Anchomanes
    - Nephthytis
    - Cercestis
  - Tribe Culcasieae
    - Culcasia
  - Tribe Montrichardieae
    - Montrichardia
- Subfamily Philodendroideae
  - Tribe Philodendreae
    - Subtribe Homalomeninae
      - Furtadoa
      - Homalomena
    - Subtribe Schismatoglottidinae
      - Schismatoglottis
      - Piptospatha
      - Hottarum
      - Bucephalandra
      - Phymatarum
      - Aridarum
      - Heteroaridarum
    - Subtribe Philodendrinae
      - Philodendron
  - Tribe Anubiadeae
    - Anubias
    - Bognera
  - Tribe Aglaonemateae
    - Aglaonema
    - Aglaodorum
  - Tribe Dieffenbachieae
    - Dieffenbachia
  - Tribe Zantedeschieae
    - Zantedeschia
  - Tribe Typhonodoreae
    - Typhonodorum
  - Tribe Peltandreae
    - Peltandra
- Subfamily Colocasioideae
  - Tribe Caladieae
    - Xanthosoma
    - Chlorospatha
    - Caladium
    - Scaphispatha
    - Jasarum
  - Tribe Steudnereae
    - Subtribe Steudnerinae
      - Steudnera
      - Remusatia
      - Gonatanthus
    - Subtribe Hapalininae
      - Hapaline
  - Tribe Protareae
    - Protarum
  - Tribe Colocasieae
    - Colocasia
    - Alocasia
  - Tribe Syngonieae
    - Syngonium
  - Tribe Ariopsideae
    - Ariopsis
- Subfamily Aroideae
  - Tribe Stylochaetoneae
    - Stylochaeton
  - Tribe Arophyteae
    - Carlephyton
    - Colletogyne
    - Arophyton
  - Tribe Spathicarpeae
    - Mangonia
    - Taccarum
    - Asterostigma
    - Gorgonidium
    - Synandrospadix
    - Gearum
    - Spathantheum
    - Spathicarpa
  - Tribe Zomicarpeae
    - Zomicarpa
    - Filarum
    - Zomicarpella
    - Ulearum
  - Tribe Thomsonieae
    - Amorphophallus
    - Pseudodracontium
  - Tribe Areae
    - Subtribe Arinae
      - Arum
      - Dracunculus
      - Helicodiceros
      - Theriophonum
      - Typhonium
      - Sauromatum
      - Eminium
      - Biarum
    - Subtribe Arisarinae
      - Arisarum
    - Subtribe Arisaematinae
      - Arisaema
    - Subtribe Atherurinae
      - Pinellia
    - Subtribe Ambrosininae
      - Ambrosina
    - Subtribe Cryptocoryninae
      - Lagenandra
      - Cryptocoryne
- Subfamily Pistioideae
  - Pistia
