= Ariopsis =

Ariopsis is the scientific name of two genera of organisms and may refer to:

- Ariopsis (fish), a genus of catfishes in the family Ariidae
- Ariopsis (plant), a genus of plants in the family Araceae
