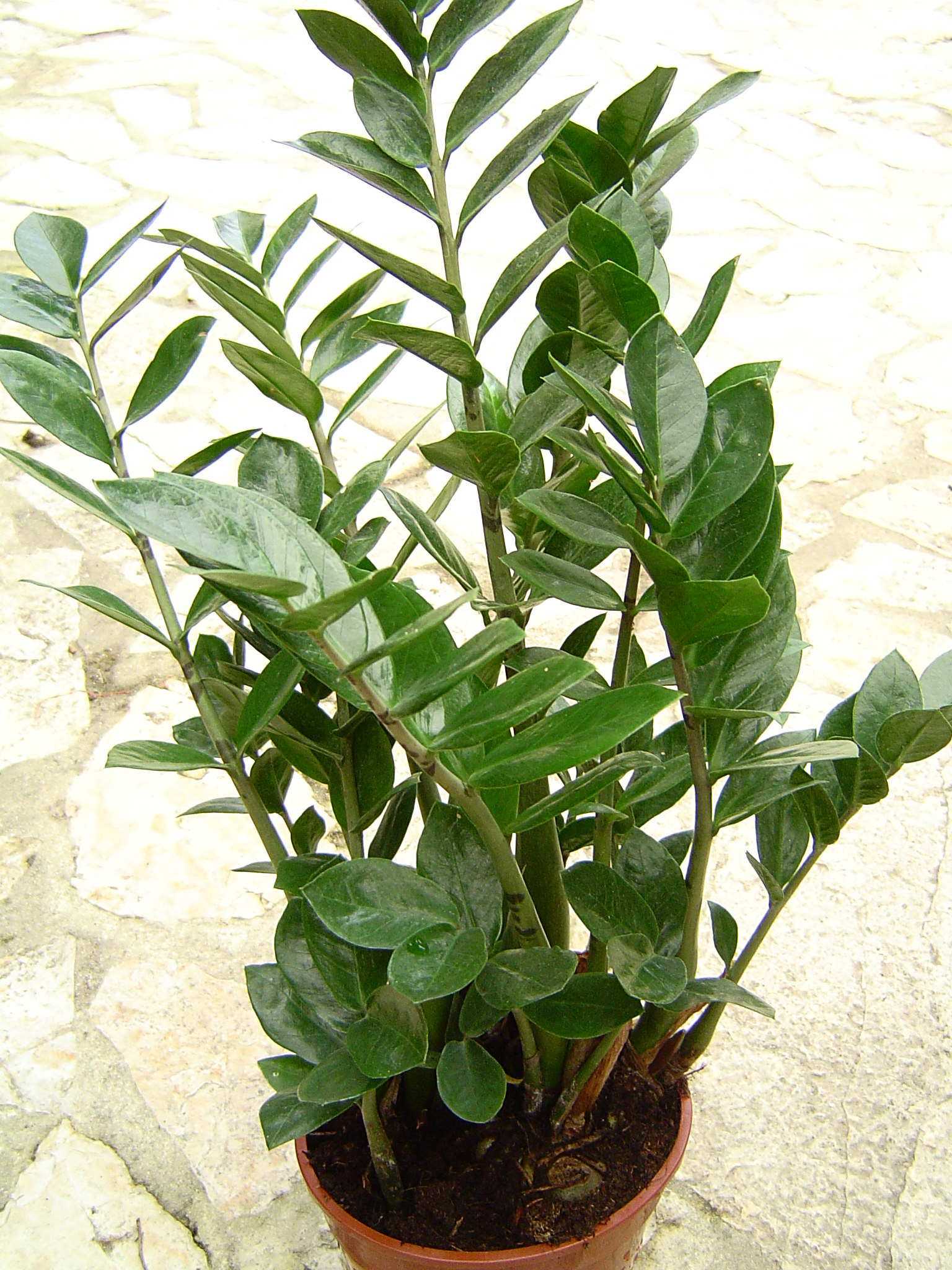
- Zamioculcas zamiifolia

Scientific classification
- Kingdom: Plantae
- Clade: Tracheophytes
- Clade: Angiosperms
- Clade: Monocots
- Order: Alismatales
- Family: Araceae
- Subfamily: Zamioculcadoideae

Genera
- See here

= Zamioculcadoideae =

Subfamily of flowering plants

Zamioculcadoideae is a subfamily of flowering plants in the family Araceae that consists of two genera, Zamioculcas and Gonatopus. It was proposed in 2005 by Bogner and Hesse after molecular studies indicated the need for the subfamily. There are also some genetic indications that Stylochaeton should be included in the subfamily.

== Taxonomy ==
It was described by Josef Bogner and Michael Hesse in 2005 with Zamioculcas Schott as the type genus.

=== Genera ===
It has three genera:

- Gonatopus Engl.
- Stylochaeton Lepr.
- Zamioculcas Schott
