= Colobogynium =

Scientific classification
- Kingdom: Plantae
- Clade: Tracheophytes
- Clade: Angiosperms
- Clade: Monocots
- Order: Alismatales
- Family: Araceae
- Subfamily: Aroideae
- Tribe: Schismatoglottideae
- Genus: Colobogynium; Schott (1865)
- Species: C. variegatum

Binomial name
- Colobogynium variegatum (Hook. ex Veitch) S.Y.Wong, A.Hay & P.C.Boyce (2023)

Synonyms
- Colobogynium tecturatum Schott (1865); Homalomena fasciata Ridl. (1905); Schismatoglottis beccariana Engl. (1879); Schismatoglottis beccariana var. albolineata Engl. (1879); Schismatoglottis beccariana var. angustifolia Engl. (1879); Schismatoglottis beccariana var. oblonga Engl. (1879); Schismatoglottis crassifolia Engl. (1912); Schismatoglottis fasciata (Ridl.) Engl. (1912); Schismatoglottis homalomenoidea M.Hotta (1966); Schismatoglottis opaca Engl. (1912); Schismatoglottis ornata Alderw. (1922); Schismatoglottis parviflora M.Hotta (1966); Schismatoglottis tecturata (Schott) Engl. (1912); Schismatoglottis variegata Hook. ex Veitch (1862) (basionym)

Genus of flowering plants

Colobogynium variegatum is a species of flowering plant in the arum family, Araceae. It is the sole species in genus Colobogynium. It is a perennial or rhizomatous geophyte native to Borneo and the Riau Islands.
