= Gamogyne =

Scientific classification
- Kingdom: Plantae
- Clade: Tracheophytes
- Clade: Angiosperms
- Clade: Monocots
- Order: Alismatales
- Family: Araceae
- Genus: Gamogyne; N.E.Br. (1882)

Species
- six; see text

Genus of flowering plants

Gamogyne is a genus of flowering plants in the arum family, Araceae. It includes six species endemic to Borneo.

== Species ==
Six species are accepted.

- Gamogyne bella (S.Y.Wong & P.C.Boyce) S.Y.Wong & P.C.Boyce
- Gamogyne burbidgei N.E.Br.
- Gamogyne colata (P.C.Boyce & S.Y.Wong) S.Y.Wong & P.C.Boyce
- Gamogyne deceptrix (P.C.Boyce & S.Y.Wong) S.Y.Wong & P.C.Boyce
- Gamogyne helix (S.Y.Wong & P.C.Boyce) S.Y.Wong & P.C.Boyce
- Gamogyne lurida (S.Y.Wong & P.C.Boyce) S.Y.Wong & P.C.Boyce
