= Heteroaridarum =

Scientific classification
- Kingdom: Plantae
- Clade: Tracheophytes
- Clade: Angiosperms
- Clade: Monocots
- Order: Alismatales
- Family: Araceae
- Subfamily: Aroideae
- Tribe: Schismatoglottideae
- Genus: Heteroaridarum; M.Hotta

Genus of flowering plants

Heteroaridarum is a genus of flowering plants in the Araceae family. It includes three species endemic to Borneo.

- Heteroaridarum borneense M.Hotta
- Heteroaridarum crassum (S.Y.Wong & P.C.Boyce) S.Y.Wong & P.C.Boyce
- Heteroaridarum nicolsonii (Bogner) S.Y.Wong & P.C.Boyce
