= Burttianthus =

Scientific classification
- Kingdom: Plantae
- Clade: Tracheophytes
- Clade: Angiosperms
- Clade: Monocots
- Order: Alismatales
- Family: Araceae
- Genus: Burttianthus; S.Y.Wong, S.L.Low & P.C.Boyce

Genus of flowering plants

Burttianthus is a genus of flowering plants belonging to the family Araceae.

Its native range is Borneo.

Species:

- Burttianthus caulescens (M.Hotta) S.Y.Wong & P.C.Boyce
- Burttianthus hansenii (Bogner) S.Y.Wong & P.C.Boyce
- Burttianthus longipedunculatus (M.Hotta) S.Y.Wong & P.C.Boyce
- Burttianthus orestus (S.Y.Wong, S.L.Low & P.C.Boyce) S.Y.Wong & P.C.Boyce
- Burttianthus purseglovei (Furtado) S.Y.Wong & P.C.Boyce
- Burttianthus spissus (S.Y.Wong, S.L.Low & P.C.Boyce) S.Y.Wong & P.C.Boyce
- Burttianthus veluntandrus (S.Y.Wong, S.L.Low & P.C.Boyce) S.Y.Wong & P.C.Boyce
