= Anadendrum =

Scientific classification
- Kingdom: Plantae
- Clade: Tracheophytes
- Clade: Angiosperms
- Clade: Monocots
- Order: Alismatales
- Family: Araceae
- Subfamily: Monsteroideae
- Tribe: Anadendreae
- Genus: Anadendrum; Schott

Genus of flowering plants

Anadendrum is a genus of flowering plants in the family Araceae. It is native to China and Southeast Asia.

== Species ==
- Anadendrum affine Schott - Borneo, Sumatra
- Anadendrum angustifolium Engl. - Thailand, Peninsular Malaysia
- Anadendrum badium P.C.Boyce - Thailand
- Anadendrum cordatum Schott - Sumatra
- Anadendrum ellipticum Widyartini & Widjaja - Borneo, Sumatra, Java, Peninsular Malaysia
- Anadendrum griseum P.C.Boyce - Thailand
- Anadendrum latifolium Hook.f - Yunnan, Laos, Vietnam, Cambodia, Peninsular Malaysia, Borneo, Java, Sumatra, Sulawesi, Philippines
- Anadendrum marcesovaginatum P.C.Boyce - Thailand
- Anadendrum marginatum Schott - Sumatra, Peninsular Malaysia, Sarawak
- Anadendrum microstachyum (de Vriese & Miq.) Backer & Alderw. - Peninsular Malaysia, Borneo, Java, Sumatra, Sulawesi, Philippines, Thailand, southern China
- Anadendrum montanum Schott - Yunnan, Indochina, Java, Sulawesi, Philippines
- Anadendrum superans Alderw. - Sumatra
- Anadendrum Calcicola Borneo. -
