= Galantharum =

Scientific classification
- Kingdom: Plantae
- Clade: Tracheophytes
- Clade: Angiosperms
- Clade: Monocots
- Order: Alismatales
- Family: Araceae
- Genus: Galantharum; P.C.Boyce & S.Y.Wong
- Species: G. kishii

Binomial name
- Galantharum kishii P.C.Boyce & S.Y.Wong

Genus of plants

Galantharum is a monotypic genus of flowering plants belonging to the family Araceae. The only species is Galantharum kishii.

The species is found in Borneo.
