= Aia tseui =

Scientific classification
- Kingdom: Plantae
- Clade: Tracheophytes
- Clade: Angiosperms
- Clade: Monocots
- Order: Alismatales
- Family: Araceae
- Subfamily: Aroideae
- Tribe: Schismatoglottideae
- Genus: Aia; S.Y.Wong & P.C.Boyce
- Species: A. tseui

Binomial name
- Aia tseui (S.Y.Wong & P.C.Boyce) S.Y.Wong & P.C.Boyce

Synonyms
- Schismatoglottis tseui S.Y.Wong & P.C.Boyce

Species of flowering plant

Aia tseui is a species of flowering plant in the arum family, Araceae. It is the sole species in genus Aia. It is a perennial or rhizomatous geophyte endemic to Malaysia's Sarawak state in northern Borneo.

The plant was first described as Schismatoglottis tseui by Sin Yeng Wong and Peter Charles Boyce in 2014. In 2024 Wong and Boyce placed the species in the newly described monotypic genus Aia as Aia tseui.
