= Vivaria calvasensis =

Scientific classification
- Kingdom: Plantae
- Clade: Tracheophytes
- Clade: Angiosperms
- Clade: Monocots
- Order: Alismatales
- Family: Araceae
- Genus: Vivaria; O.Cabrera, Tinitana, Cumbicus, Prina & Paulo Herrera (2022)
- Species: V. calvasensis

Binomial name
- Vivaria calvasensis O.Cabrera, Tinitana, Cumbicus, Prina & Paulo Herrera (2022)

Species of flowering plant

Vivaria calvasensis is a species of flowering plant in the arum family, Araceae. It is the sole species in genus Vivaria. It is endemic to Ecuador.
