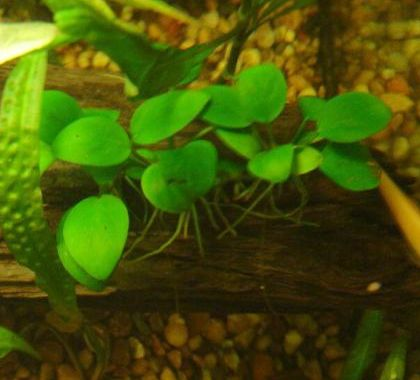
- Anubias barteri var. nana on a bogwood (top view)

Scientific classification
- Kingdom: Plantae
- Clade: Tracheophytes
- Clade: Angiosperms
- Clade: Monocots
- Order: Alismatales
- Family: Araceae
- Subfamily: Aroideae
- Tribe: Anubiadeae; Engler

Genus
- Anubias

= Anubiadeae =

Tribe of aquatic plants

The Anubiadeae are a tribe of the family Araceae, subfamily Aroideae. The tribe was first described in 1879 by Adolf Engler and contained only the genus Anubias Schott. In 1915, Engler added the genus Amauriella Rendle. The two genera were distinguished by the position of the thecae on the synandria (fused anthers). The latest taxonomic revision regards Amauriella as a synonym of Anubias, leaving this a monogeneric tribe. The Anubiadeae are aquatic and semi-aquatic plants and are native to tropical central and western Africa. They primarily grow in rivers and streams, but can also be found in marshes.
