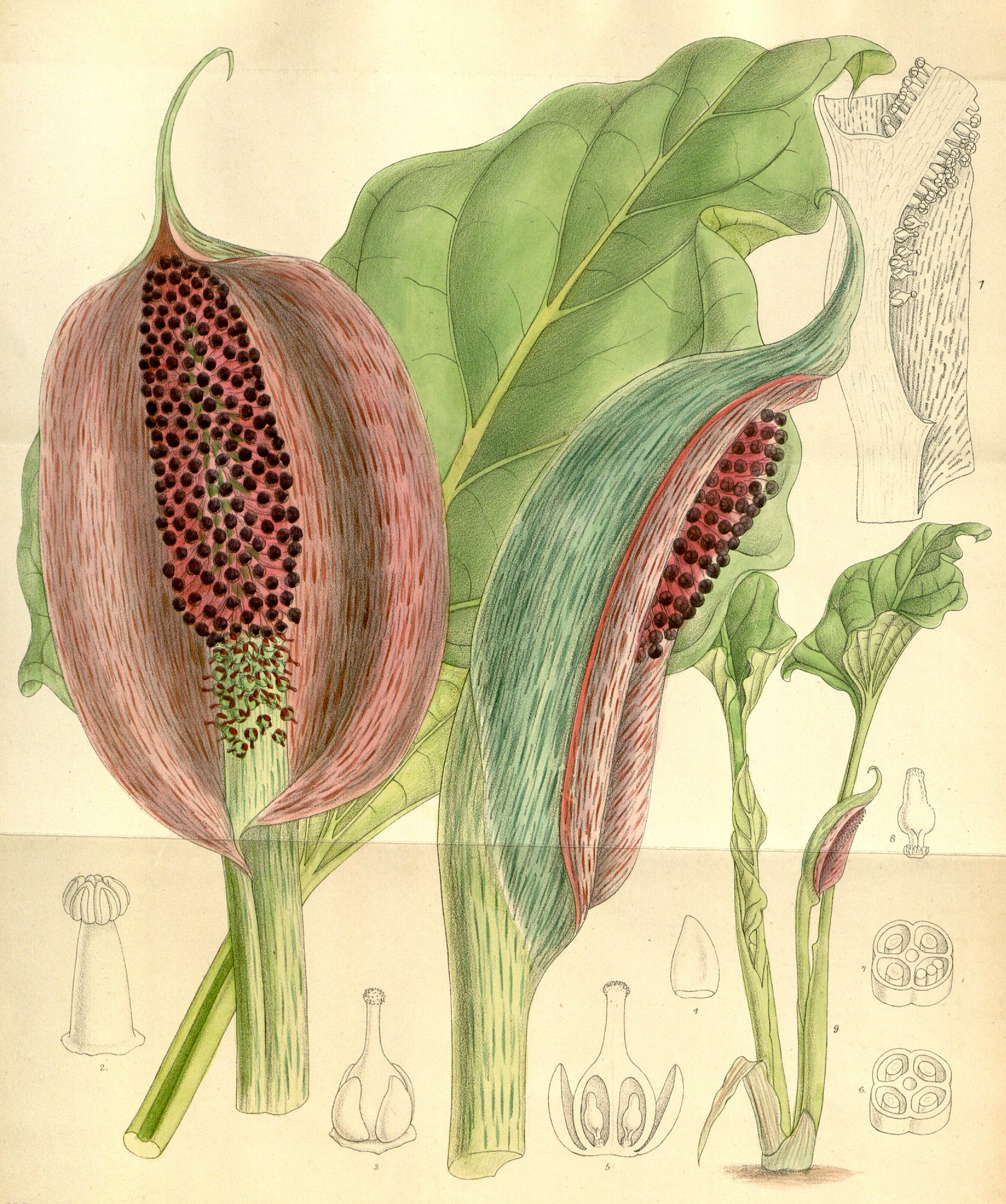
- Synandrospadix vermitoxicus

Scientific classification
- Kingdom: Plantae
- Clade: Tracheophytes
- Clade: Angiosperms
- Clade: Monocots
- Order: Alismatales
- Family: Araceae
- Subfamily: Aroideae
- Tribe: Spathicarpeae
- Genus: Synandrospadix; Engl.
- Species: S. vermitoxicus

Binomial name
- Synandrospadix vermitoxicus (Griseb.) Engl.

Synonyms
- Asterostigma vermitoxicum Griseb.; Staurostigma vermitoxicum (Griseb.) Engl.; Lilloa puki Speg.

= Synandrospadix =

Genus of flowering plants

Synandrospadix is a monotypic genus of flowering plants in the family Araceae. It comprises a single species Synandrospadix vermitoxicus. It is found in Peru, Argentina, Paraguay, and Bolivia. The inflorescence has an unpleasant smell with a spathe whose inner surface is purple with brownish-green warts and a smooth green outer surface. The spadix is egg shaped, red, and has spiked male flowers protruding from it.

== Uses ==
The Indigenous Enxet people of the Paraguayan Gran Chaco traditionally consume the roots of Synandrospadix (yátapomxet in Enxet), which are gathered in the wild.
