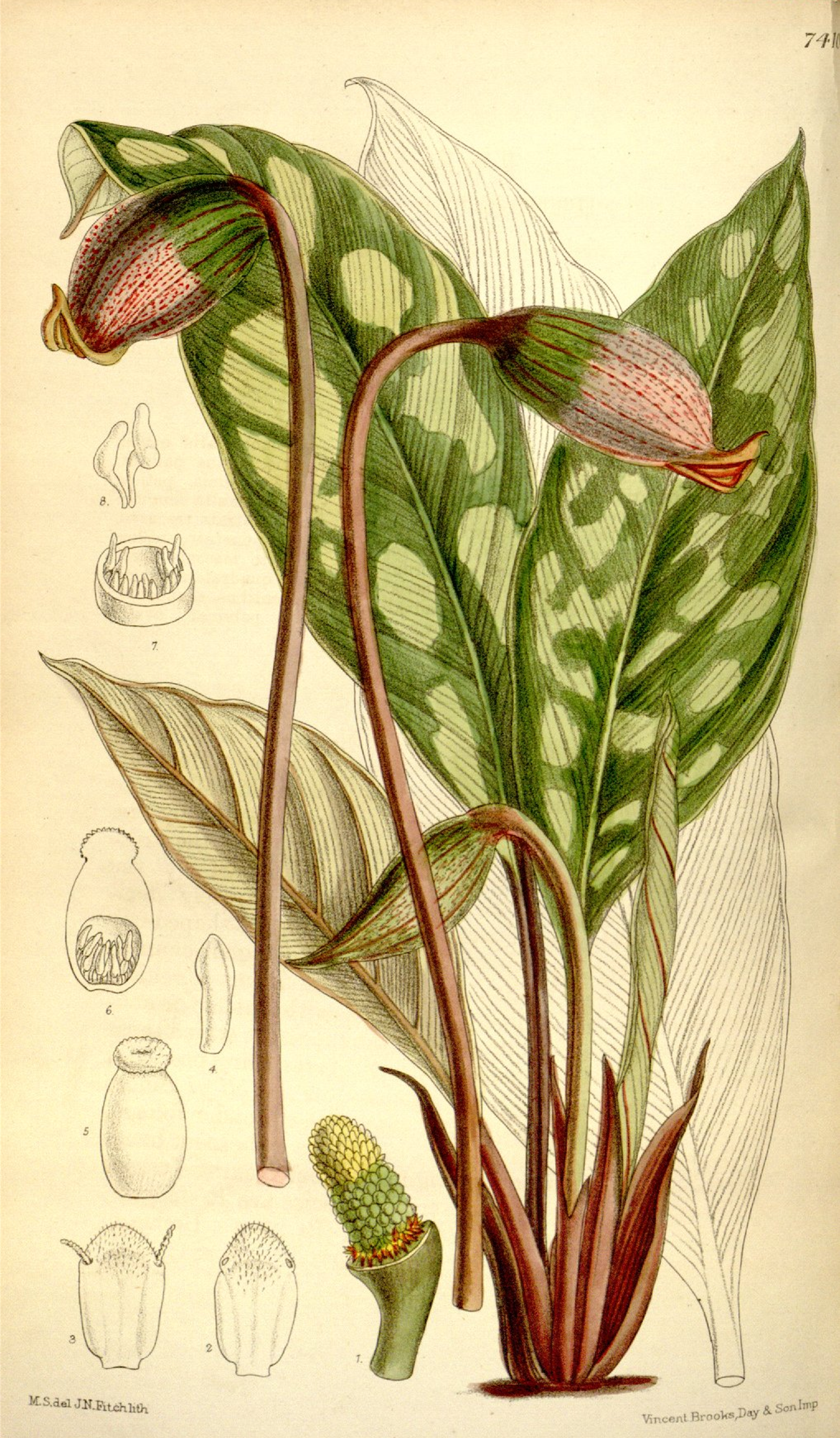
- Piptospatha ridleyi

Scientific classification
- Kingdom: Plantae
- Clade: Tracheophytes
- Clade: Angiosperms
- Clade: Monocots
- Order: Alismatales
- Family: Araceae
- Subfamily: Aroideae
- Tribe: Schismatoglottideae
- Genus: Piptospatha; N.E.Br. (1879)

= Piptospatha =

Genus of flowering plants

Piptospatha is a genus of flowering plants in the family Araceae. The genus is characteristic is rheophytic and has seeds that are dispersed by splashes of water hitting its cup-like spathes. It includes three species native to Borneo.

- Piptospatha insignis N.E.Br. - Sarawak
- Piptospatha remiformis Ridl. - Sarawak
- Piptospatha repens H.Okada & Tsukaya - Kalimantan Barat
