= Hottarum =

Scientific classification
- Kingdom: Plantae
- Clade: Tracheophytes
- Clade: Angiosperms
- Clade: Monocots
- Order: Alismatales
- Family: Araceae
- Genus: Hottarum; Bogner & Nicolson (1978)
- Species: H. truncatum

Binomial name
- Hottarum truncatum (M.Hotta) Bogner & Nicolson (1978)

Synonyms
- Microcasia truncata M.Hotta (1965); Piptospatha truncata (M.Hotta) Bogner & A.Hay (2000)

Genus of flowering plants

Hottarum truncatum is a species of flowering plant in the arum family, Araceae. It is the sole species in genus Hottarum. It is a subshrub endemic to the Malaysian state of Sarawak on the island of Borneo.
