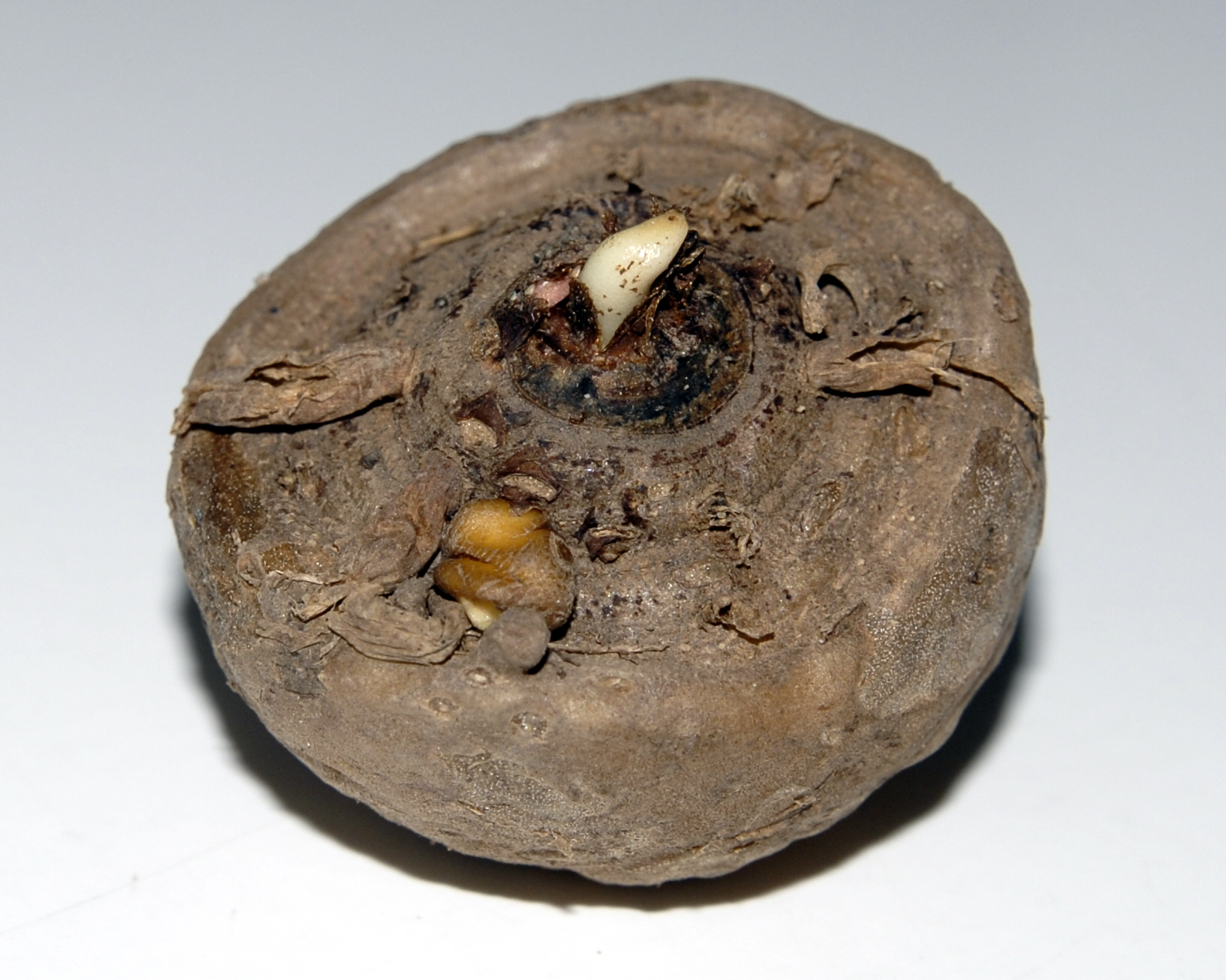
- Tuber of Pycnospatha arietina

Scientific classification
- Kingdom: Plantae
- Clade: Tracheophytes
- Clade: Angiosperms
- Clade: Monocots
- Order: Alismatales
- Family: Araceae
- Subfamily: Lasioideae
- Genus: Pycnospatha; Thorel ex Gagnep.

= Pycnospatha =

Genus of flowering plants

Pycnospatha is a genus of flowering plants in the family Araceae. It contains only two species both of which are tuberous and endemic to Indochina (Laos, Thailand, Cambodia, Vietnam).

- Pycnospatha arietina Gagnep. - Thailand, Cambodia, Quan Phu Quoc Island of Vietnam
- Pycnospatha palmata Gagnep. - Laos, Thailand
