= Gearum =

Scientific classification
- Kingdom: Plantae
- Clade: Tracheophytes
- Clade: Angiosperms
- Clade: Monocots
- Order: Alismatales
- Family: Araceae
- Subfamily: Aroideae
- Tribe: Spathicarpeae
- Genus: Gearum; N.E.Br.
- Species: G. brasiliense

Binomial name
- Gearum brasiliense N.E.Br.

Genus of flowering plants

Gearum is genus of flowering plants in the family Araceae. It contains only one described species, Gearum brasiliense, native to central Brazil (States of Tocantins + Mato Grosso).
