= Naiadia =

Scientific classification
- Kingdom: Plantae
- Clade: Tracheophytes
- Clade: Angiosperms
- Clade: Monocots
- Order: Alismatales
- Family: Araceae
- Genus: Naiadia; S.Y.Wong, S.L.Low & P.C.Boyce
- Species: N. zygoseta

Binomial name
- Naiadia zygoseta (S.Y.Wong, S.L.Low & P.C.Boyce) S.Y.Wong & P.C.Boyce

Genus of plants

Naiadia is a monotypic genus of flowering plants belonging to the family Araceae. The only species is Naiadia zygoseta.

The species is found in Borneo.
