= Boycea =

Scientific classification
- Kingdom: Plantae
- Clade: Tracheophytes
- Clade: Angiosperms
- Clade: Monocots
- Order: Alismatales
- Family: Araceae
- Genus: Boycea; A.Hay (2022)
- Species: B. bintuluensis

Binomial name
- Boycea bintuluensis (A.Hay, Bogner & P.C.Boyce) A.Hay (2022)

Synonyms
- Nephthytis bintuluensis A.Hay, Bogner & P.C.Boyce (1994)

Genus of flowering plants

Boycea bintuluensis is a species of flowering plant in the arum family, Araceae. It is the sole species in genus Boycea. It is a perennial or rhizomatous geophyte endemic to the Malaysian state of Sarawak on the island of Borneo.

The species was first described as Nephthytis bintuluensis in 1994. In 2022, it was renamed Boycea bintuluensis and placed in its own genus.
