= Hera hebe =

Scientific classification
- Kingdom: Plantae
- Clade: Tracheophytes
- Clade: Angiosperms
- Clade: Monocots
- Order: Alismatales
- Family: Araceae
- Genus: Hera; S.Y.Wong, S.L.Low & P.C.Boyce (2018)
- Species: H. hebe

Binomial name
- Hera hebe (S.Y.Wong, S.L.Low & P.C.Boyce) S.Y.Wong & P.C.Boyce (2018)

Synonyms
- Aridarum hebe S.Y.Wong, S.L.Low & P.C.Boyce (2014)

Species of flowering plant

Hera hebe is a species of flowering plant in the arum family, Araceae. It is the sole species in genus Hera. It is endemic to the Indonesian portion of Borneo (Kalimantan).

The species was first described as Aridarum hebe in 2014. In 2018 it was renamed Hera hebe, and placed in its own genus.
