= Kiewia =

Scientific classification
- Kingdom: Plantae
- Clade: Tracheophytes
- Clade: Angiosperms
- Clade: Monocots
- Order: Alismatales
- Family: Araceae
- Genus: Kiewia; S.Y.Wong & P.C.Boyce

Genus of plants

Kiewia is a genus of flowering plants belonging to the family Araceae.

Its native range is Southern Peninsular Thailand to Western Malesia.

Species:

- Kiewia perakensis (Engl.) S.Y.Wong & P.C.Boyce
- Kiewia ridleyi (N.E.Br. ex Hook.f.) S.Y.Wong & P.C.Boyce
- Kiewia teijsmannii (P.C.Boyce & S.Y.Wong) S.Y.Wong & P.C.Boyce
