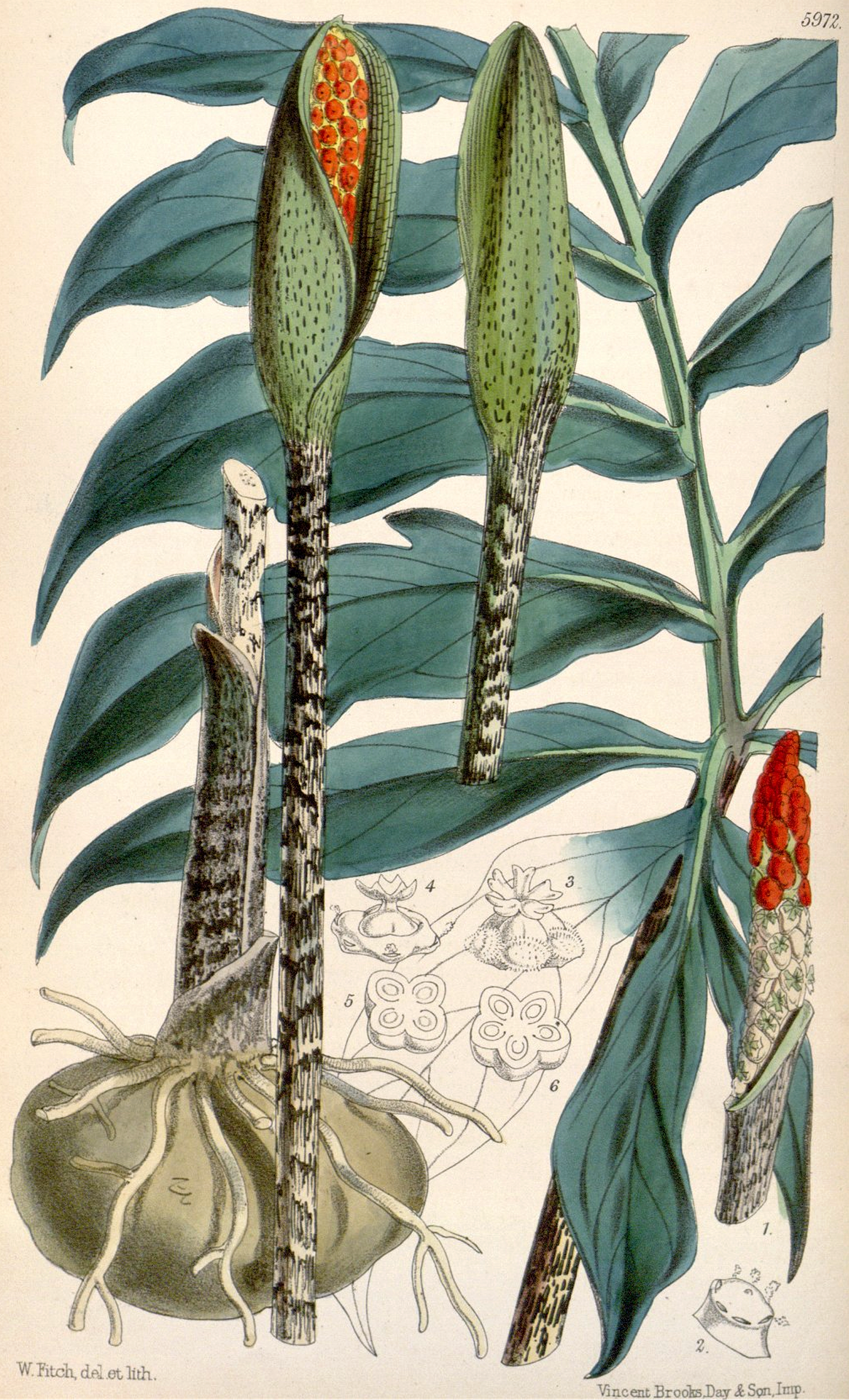
- Asterostigma luschnathianum

Scientific classification
- Kingdom: Plantae
- Clade: Embryophytes
- Clade: Tracheophytes
- Clade: Spermatophytes
- Clade: Angiosperms
- Clade: Monocots
- Order: Alismatales
- Family: Araceae
- Subfamily: Aroideae
- Tribe: Spathicarpeae
- Genus: Asterostigma; Fisch. & C.A.Mey. 1845

Synonyms
- Staurostigma Scheidw.; Andromycia A.Rich.; Rhopalostigma Schott

= Asterostigma =

Genus of flowering plants

Asterostigma is a genus of flowering plants in the family Araceae. It is native to Brazil and Argentina. The leaves are pinnate and the plant is tuberous.

Species

- Asterostigma cryptostylum Bogner - Brasília, Goiás, Minas Gerais
- Asterostigma cubense (A.Rich.) K.Krause ex Bogner - São Paulo
- Asterostigma lividum (G.Lodd.) Engl. - southern Brazil; Misiones Province of Argentina
- Asterostigma lombardii E.G.Gonç. - Minas Gerais, Espírito Santo
- Asterostigma luschnathianum Schott - southern Brazil
- Asterostigma reticulatum E.G.Gonç - southern Brazil
- Asterostigma riedelianum (Schott) Kuntze - eastern Brazil
- Asterostigma tweedieanum Schott - Santa Catarina in southern Brazil
