= Croatiella =

Scientific classification
- Kingdom: Plantae
- Clade: Tracheophytes
- Clade: Angiosperms
- Clade: Monocots
- Order: Alismatales
- Family: Araceae
- Subfamily: Aroideae
- Tribe: Spathicarpeae
- Genus: Croatiella; E.G.Gonç.
- Species: C. integrifolia

Binomial name
- Croatiella integrifolia (Madison) E.G.Gonç.

Synonyms
- Asterostigma integrifolium Madison

Genus of flowering plants

Croatiella is a genus of plants in the family Araceae. It has only one known species, Croatiella integrifolia, endemic to Ecuador.
