= Josefia =

Scientific classification
- Kingdom: Plantae
- Clade: Tracheophytes
- Clade: Angiosperms
- Clade: Monocots
- Order: Alismatales
- Family: Araceae
- Genus: Josefia; Scherber., K.Hase & P.C.Boyce (2023)
- Species: J. intricata

Binomial name
- Josefia intricata Scherber., Wongso & K.Hase (2023)

Genus of flowering plants

Josefia intricata is a species of flowering plant in the arum family, Araceae. It is the sole species in genus Josefia. It is endemic to the Indonesian portion of Borneo (Kalimantan).
