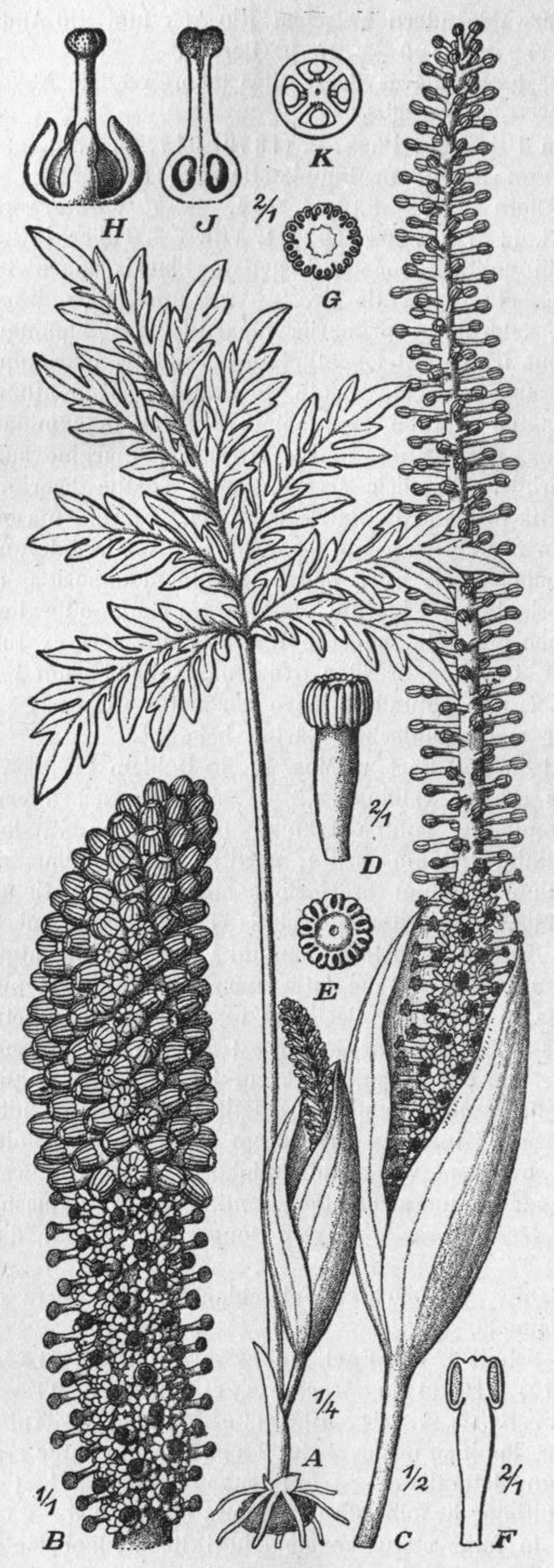
- Taccarum weddellianum

Scientific classification
- Kingdom: Plantae
- Clade: Tracheophytes
- Clade: Angiosperms
- Clade: Monocots
- Order: Alismatales
- Family: Araceae
- Subfamily: Aroideae
- Tribe: Spathicarpeae
- Genus: Taccarum; Brongn. ex Schott

Synonyms
- Lysistigma Schott; Endera Regel

= Taccarum =

Genus of flowering plants

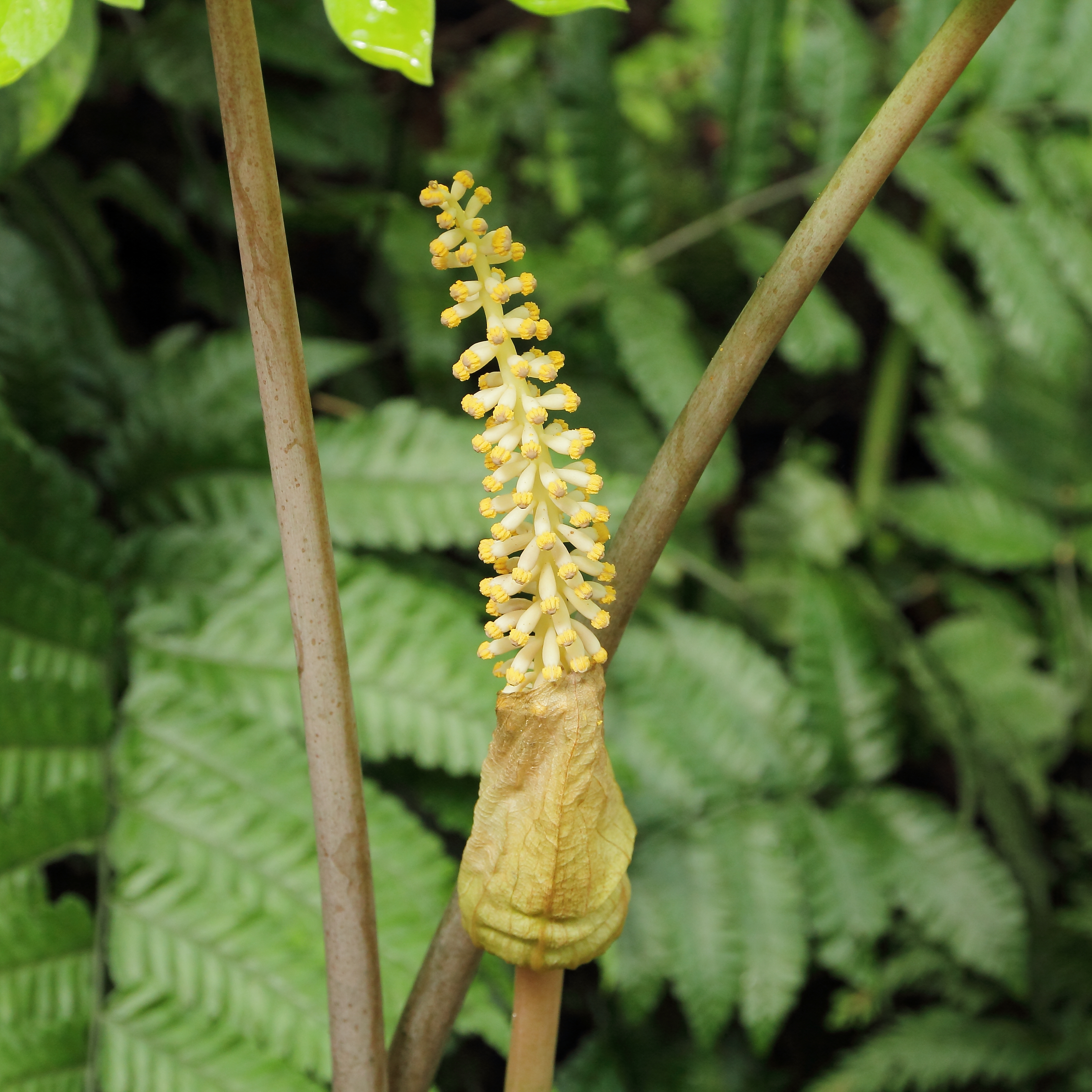
Taccarum weddellianum

Taccarum is a genus of flowering plants in the family Araceae. It is endemic to South America. The genus tends to grow in rocky areas.

Species

- Taccarum caudatum Rusby - Bolivia, Peru, Acre State in western Brazil
- Taccarum crassispathum E.G.Gonç. - central Brazil
- Taccarum peregrinum (Schott) Engl. - Paraguay, southern Brazil, Misiones Province of Argentina
- Taccarum ulei Engl. & K.Krause - eastern Brazil
- Taccarum warmingii Engl. - southern Brazil
- Taccarum weddellianum Brongn. ex Schott - Bolivia, Peru, Paraguay, central and western Brazil
