= Toga (plant) =

Scientific classification
- Kingdom: Plantae
- Clade: Tracheophytes
- Clade: Angiosperms
- Clade: Monocots
- Order: Alismatales
- Family: Araceae
- Genus: Toga; S.Y.Wong, S.L.Low & P.C.Boyce (2018)

Species
- 6; see text

Genus of flowering plants

Toga is a genus of flowering plants in the arum family, Araceae. It includes six species which are endemic to Borneo.

== Species ==
Six species are accepted.

- Toga alatensis (S.Y.Wong, S.L.Low & P.C.Boyce) S.Y.Wong & P.C.Boyce
- Toga hippocrepis (P.C.Boyce & S.Y.Wong) S.Y.Wong & P.C.Boyce
- Toga perplexa (S.Y.Wong, S.L.Low & P.C.Boyce) S.Y.Wong & P.C.Boyce
- Toga rostrata (Bogner & A.Hay) S.Y.Wong & P.C.Boyce
- Toga surukensis (S.Y.Wong, S.L.Low & P.C.Boyce) S.Y.Wong & P.C.Boyce
- Toga unca (P.C.Boyce & S.Y.Wong) S.Y.Wong & P.C.Boyce
