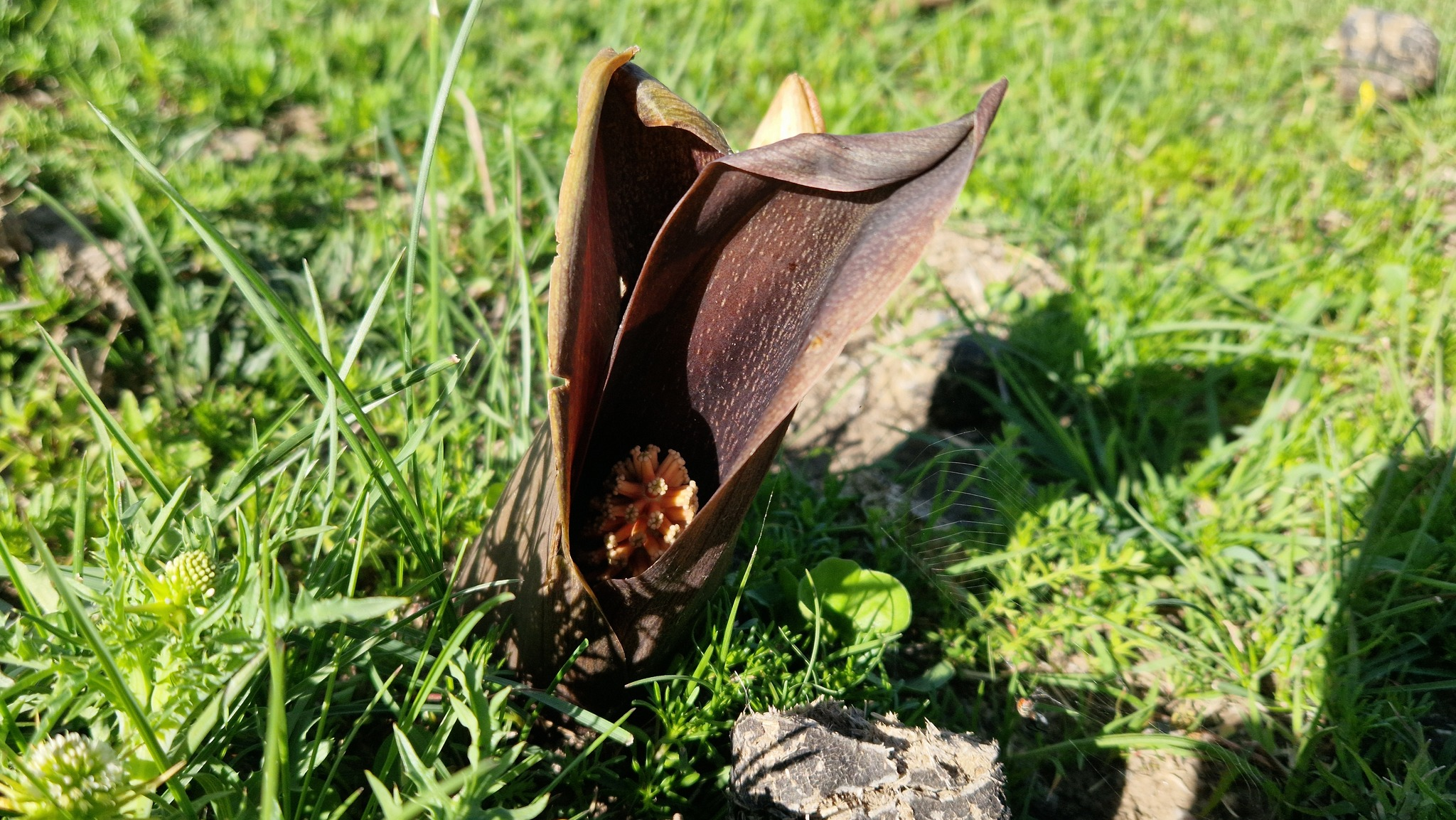
- Gorgonidium vermicidum in Argentina

Scientific classification
- Kingdom: Plantae
- Clade: Embryophytes
- Clade: Tracheophytes
- Clade: Spermatophytes
- Clade: Angiosperms
- Clade: Monocots
- Order: Alismatales
- Family: Araceae
- Subfamily: Aroideae
- Tribe: Spathicarpeae
- Genus: Gorgonidium; Schott

= Gorgonidium =

Genus of flowering plants

Gorgonidium is a genus of flowering plants in the family Araceae. It is native to South America (Peru, Bolivia, and Argentina). The spathes tend to be purple and the fruits are black.

Species

- Gorgonidium beckianum Bogner - Bolivia
- Gorgonidium bulbostylum Bogner & E.G.Gonç - Bolivia
- Gorgonidium cardenasianum (Bogner) E.G.Gonç - Bolivia
- Gorgonidium intermedium (Bogner) E.G.Gonç - Peru
- Gorgonidium mirabile Schott - Bolivia
- Gorgonidium striatum Hett., Ibisch & E.G.Gonç
- Gorgonidium vargasii Bogner & Nicolson - Peru
- Gorgonidium vermicidum (Speg.) Bogner & Nicolson - Bolivia, northern Argentina
