= Chlorospatha =

Scientific classification
- Kingdom: Plantae
- Clade: Tracheophytes
- Clade: Angiosperms
- Clade: Monocots
- Order: Alismatales
- Family: Araceae
- Subfamily: Aroideae
- Tribe: Caladieae
- Genus: Chlorospatha; Engl.

Synonyms
- Caladiopsis Engl.

Genus of flowering plants

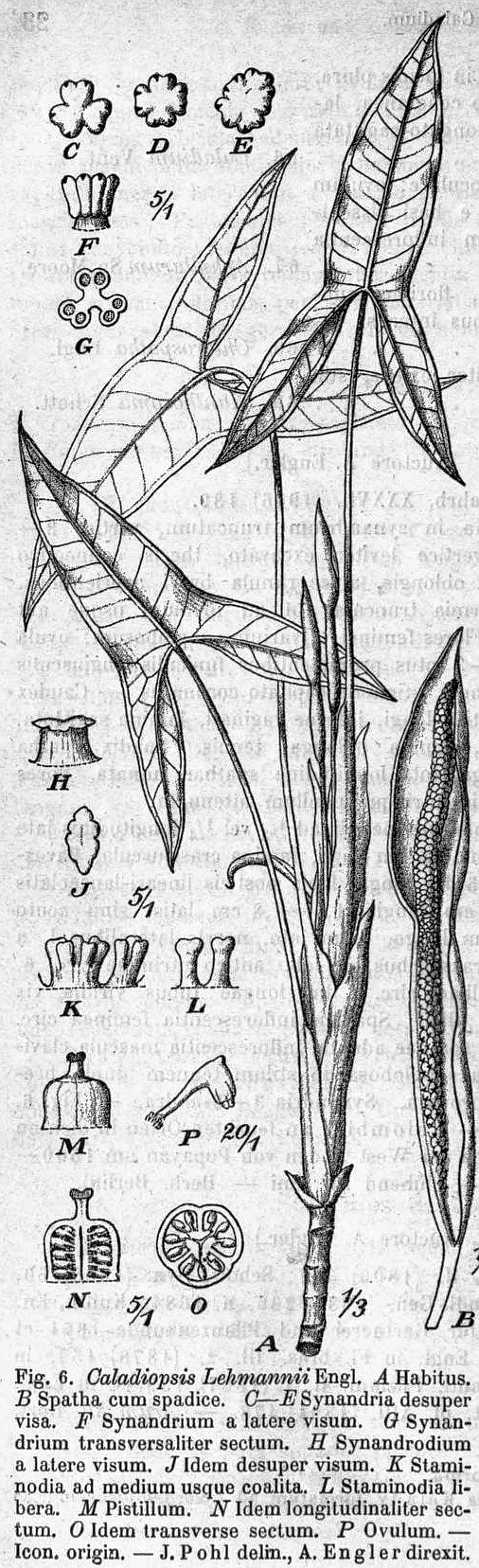
Chlorospatha lehmannii

Chlorospatha is a genus of flowering plants in the family Araceae. Chlorospatha can be found from Costa Rica, Panama, Colombia, Ecuador, and Peru.

The plants are usually found in shaded bogs and are notoriously difficult to cultivate. One of the species, C. kressii is currently believed to be extinct.

Species

- Chlorospatha amalfiensis Croat & L.P.Hannon – Antioquia region of Colombia
- Chlorospatha antioquiensis Croat & L.P.Hannon – Antioquia region of Colombia
- Chlorospatha atropurpurea (Madison) Madison – Ecuador
- Chlorospatha besseae Madison – Ecuador
- Chlorospatha betancurii Croat & L.P.Hannon – Antioquia region of Colombia
- Chlorospatha bogneri Croat & L.P.Hannon – Ecuador, Colombia
- Chlorospatha callejasii Croat & L.P.Hannon – Antioquia region of Colombia
- Chlorospatha castula (Madison) Madison – Ecuador
- Chlorospatha cogolloi Croat & L.P.Hannon – Antioquia region of Colombia
- Chlorospatha corrugata Bogner & Madison – Antioquia region of Colombia
- Chlorospatha croatiana Grayum – Costa Rica, Panama, Colombia
- Chlorospatha cutucuensis Madison – Ecuador
- Chlorospatha dodsonii (G.S.Bunting) Madison – Ecuador
- Chlorospatha feuersteiniae (Croat & Bogner) Bogner & L.P.Hannon – Ecuador
- Chlorospatha gentryi Grayum – Colombia
- Chlorospatha hammeliana Grayum & Croat – Panama
- Chlorospatha hastifolia Bogner & L.P.Hannon – Colombia
- Chlorospatha ilensis Madison – Ecuador
- Chlorospatha kolbii Engl. – Colombia
1. †Chlorospatha kressii Grayum – Chocó region of Colombia
- Chlorospatha lehmannii (Engl.) Madison – Ecuador, Colombia
- Chlorospatha longipoda (K.Krause) Madison – Ecuador
- Chlorospatha luteynii Croat & L.P.Hannon – Antioquia region of Colombia
- Chlorospatha macphersonii Croat & L.P.Hannon – Antioquia region of Colombia
- Chlorospatha mirabilis (W.Bull) Madison – Panama, Colombia, Ecuador
- Chlorospatha nicolsonii Croat & L.P.Hannon – Antioquia region of Colombia
- Chlorospatha planadensis Croat & L.P.Hannon – Colombia
- Chlorospatha ricaurtensis Croat & L.P.Hannon – Colombia
