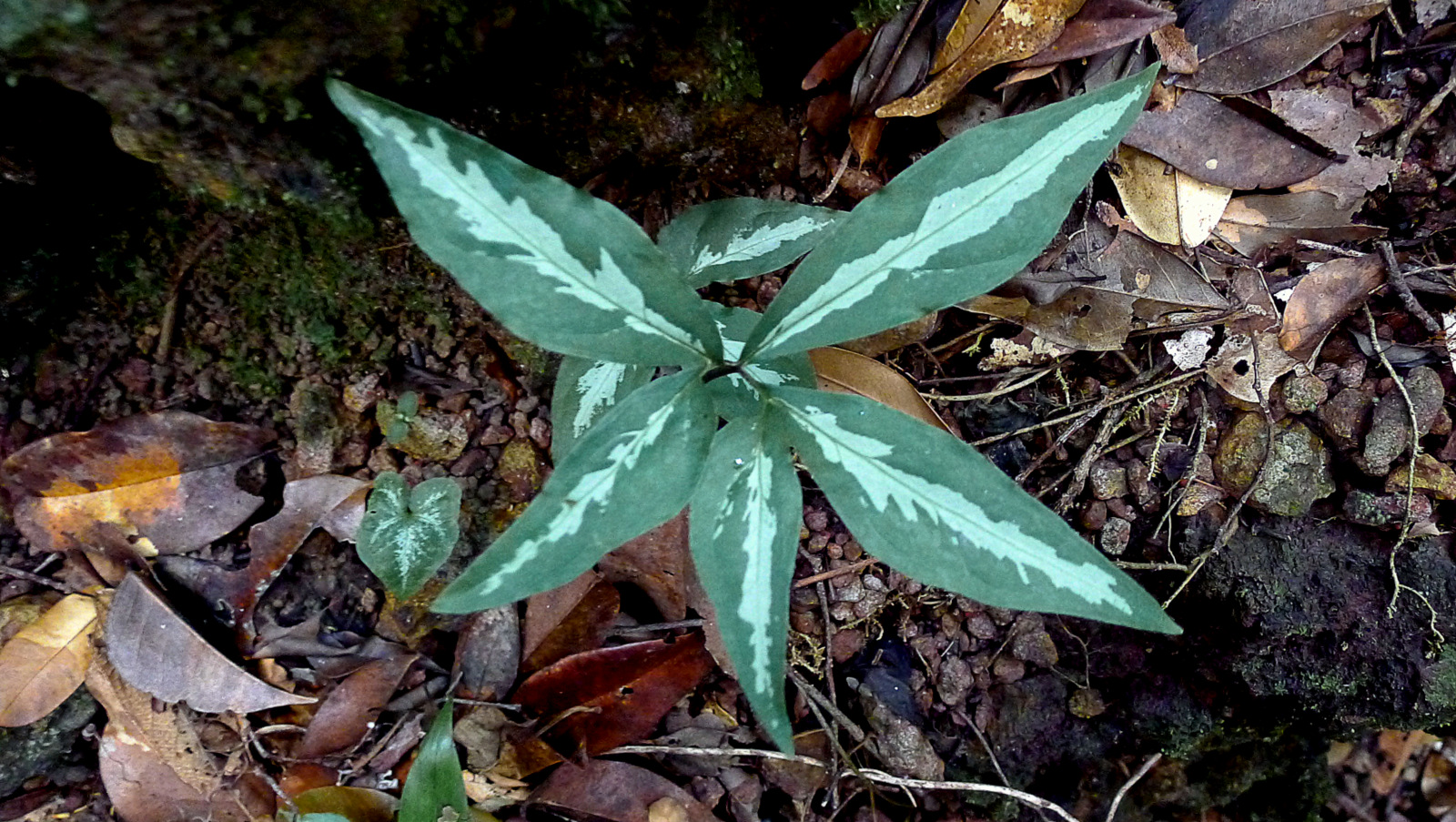
- Zomicarpa steigeriana

Scientific classification
- Kingdom: Plantae
- Clade: Tracheophytes
- Clade: Angiosperms
- Clade: Monocots
- Order: Alismatales
- Family: Araceae
- Subfamily: Aroideae
- Tribe: Caladieae
- Genus: Zomicarpa; Schott

= Zomicarpa =

Genus of flowering plants

Zomicarpa is a genus of flowering plants in the family Araceae. It is endemic to eastern Brazil.

Species

- Zomicarpa pythonium (Mart.) Schott - eastern Brazil
- Zomicarpa steigeriana Maxim. ex Schott - Bahia
