= Idimanthus =

Scientific classification
- Kingdom: Plantae
- Clade: Tracheophytes
- Clade: Angiosperms
- Clade: Monocots
- Order: Alismatales
- Family: Araceae
- Genus: Idimanthus; E.G.Gonç. (2018)
- Species: I. amorphophalloides

Binomial name
- Idimanthus amorphophalloides E.G.Gonç. (2018)

Species of flowering plant

Idimanthus amorphophalloides is a species of flowering plant in the arum family, Araceae. It is the sole species in genus Idimanthus. It is a tuberous geophyte native to Rio de Janeiro state in southeastern Brazil.
