= Pichinia =

Scientific classification
- Kingdom: Plantae
- Clade: Tracheophytes
- Clade: Angiosperms
- Clade: Monocots
- Order: Alismatales
- Family: Araceae
- Genus: Pichinia; S.Y.Wong & P.C.Boyce
- Species: P. disticha

Binomial name
- Pichinia disticha S.Y.Wong & P.C.Boyce

Genus of plants

Pichinia is a monotypic genus of flowering plants belonging to the family Araceae. The only species is Pichinia disticha.

The species is found in Borneo.
