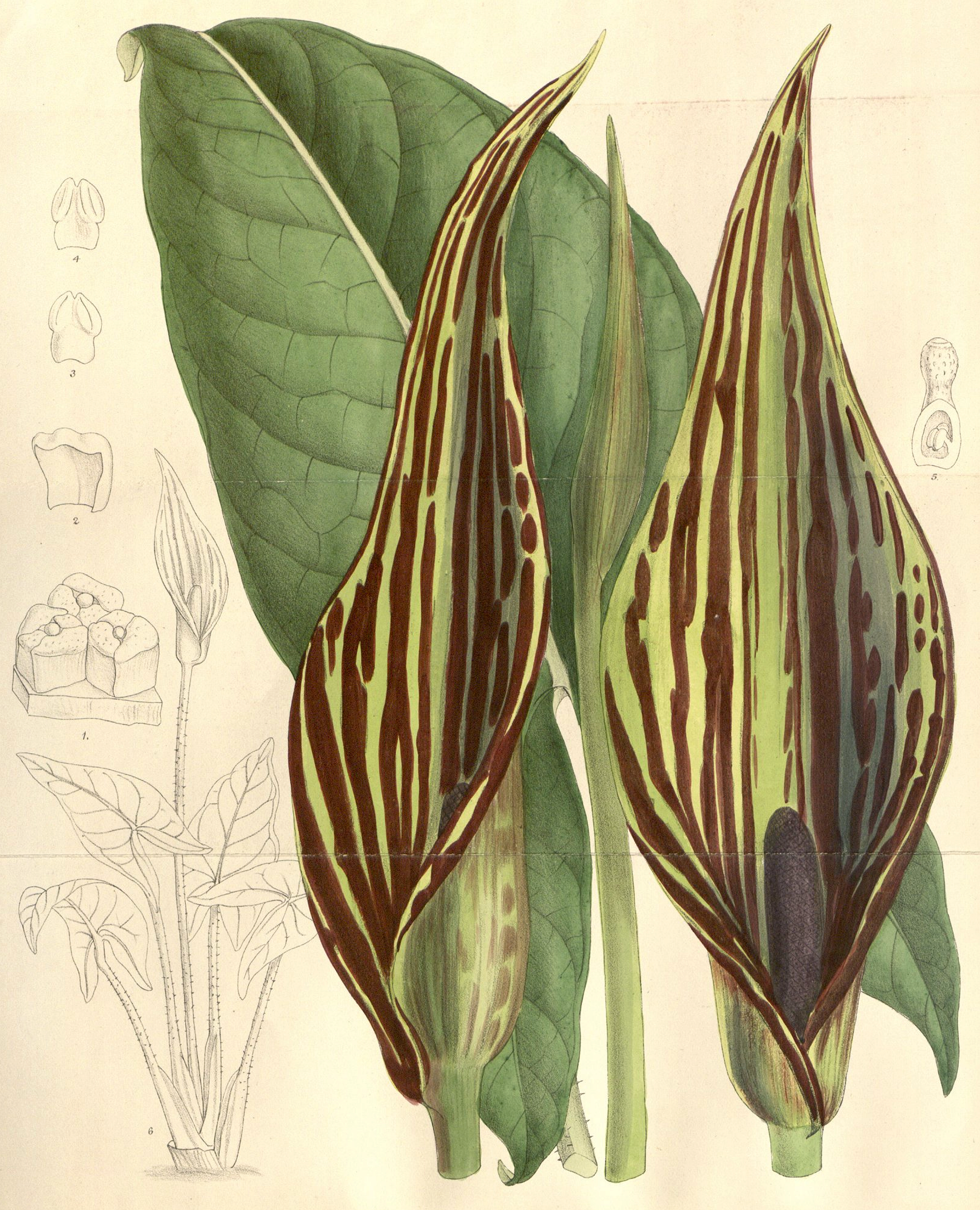
- Lasimorpha senegalensis

Conservation status
- Least Concern (IUCN 3.1)

Scientific classification
- Kingdom: Plantae
- Clade: Tracheophytes
- Clade: Angiosperms
- Clade: Monocots
- Order: Alismatales
- Family: Araceae
- Subfamily: Lasioideae
- Genus: Lasimorpha; Schott
- Species: L. senegalensis

Binomial name
- Lasimorpha senegalensis Schott

Synonyms
- Cyrtosperma senegalense (Schott) Engl.; Lasimorpha afzelii Schott; Cyrtosperma afzelii (Schott) Engl.

= Lasimorpha =

Genus of flowering plants

Lasimorpha is a monotypic genus of flowering plants in the family Araceae. It has the single species Lasimorpha senegalensis. This species is native to western and central Africa, from Liberia east to Chad and south to Angola.
