= Vesta longifolia =

Scientific classification
- Kingdom: Plantae
- Clade: Tracheophytes
- Clade: Angiosperms
- Clade: Monocots
- Order: Alismatales
- Family: Araceae
- Subfamily: Aroideae
- Tribe: Schismatoglottideae
- Genus: Vesta; S.Y.Wong
- Species: V. longifolia

Binomial name
- Vesta longifolia (Ridl.) S.Y.Wong

Synonyms
- Hestia longifolia (Ridl.) S.Y.Wong & P.C.Boyce; Schismatoglottis longifolia Ridl.

Species of flowering plant

Vesta is a genus of flowering plants in the family Araceae, formally described in 2018. It contains only one known species, Vesta longifolia, native to Perak in Peninsular Malaysia and to Brunei and Sarawak on the island of Borneo.

== Taxonomy ==
=== Taxonomic history ===
The species Vesta longifolia (Ridl.) S.Y.Wong was first described as Schismatoglottis longifolia Ridl. in 1902. Later, the genus Hestia S.Y.Wong & P.C.Boyce was proposed in 2010 for this species and it was then known as Hestia longifolia (Ridl.) S.Y.Wong & P.C.Boyce. However, Hestia now considered a Nomen illegitimum. This is due to the fact, that the generic name Hestia has already been given to a fossil lycopsid. Since the new generic name was not accepted, the new genus Vesta S.Y.Wong was described in 2018, and the single species is since known as Vesta longifolia (Ridl.) S.Y.Wong.
