= Vietnamocasia =

Scientific classification
- Kingdom: Plantae
- Clade: Tracheophytes
- Clade: Angiosperms
- Clade: Monocots
- Order: Alismatales
- Family: Araceae
- Genus: Vietnamocasia; N.S.Lý, S.Y.Wong & P.C.Boyce (2017)
- Species: V. dauae

Binomial name
- Vietnamocasia dauae N.S.Lý, Haev., S.Y.Wong & V.D.Nguyen (2017)

Genus of flowering plants

Vietnamocasia dauae is a species of flowering plant belonging to the family Araceae. It is the sole species in genus Vietnamocasia. It is a perennial or subshrub endemic to Vietnam.
