= Rhynchopyle =

Scientific classification
- Kingdom: Plantae
- Clade: Tracheophytes
- Clade: Angiosperms
- Clade: Monocots
- Order: Alismatales
- Family: Araceae
- Subfamily: Aroideae
- Tribe: Schismatoglottideae
- Genus: Rhynchopyle; Engl.

Genus of flowering plants

Rhynchopyle is a genus of flowering plants in the family Araceae. It includes seven species endemic to Borneo.

== Species ==
Seven species are accepted.

- Rhynchopyle elongata (Engl.) Engl.
- Rhynchopyle impolita (S.Y.Wong, P.C.Boyce & Bogner) S.Y.Wong & P.C.Boyce
- Rhynchopyle loi (P.C.Boyce & S.Y.Wong) S.Y.Wong & P.C.Boyce
- Rhynchopyle marginata (Engl.) Engl.
- Rhynchopyle nivea (P.C.Boyce, S.Y.Wong & Sahal) S.Y.Wong & P.C.Boyce
- Rhynchopyle pileata (S.Y.Wong & P.C.Boyce) S.Y.Wong & P.C.Boyce
- Rhynchopyle viridistigma (S.Y.Wong, P.C.Boyce & Bogner) S.Y.Wong & P.C.Boyce
