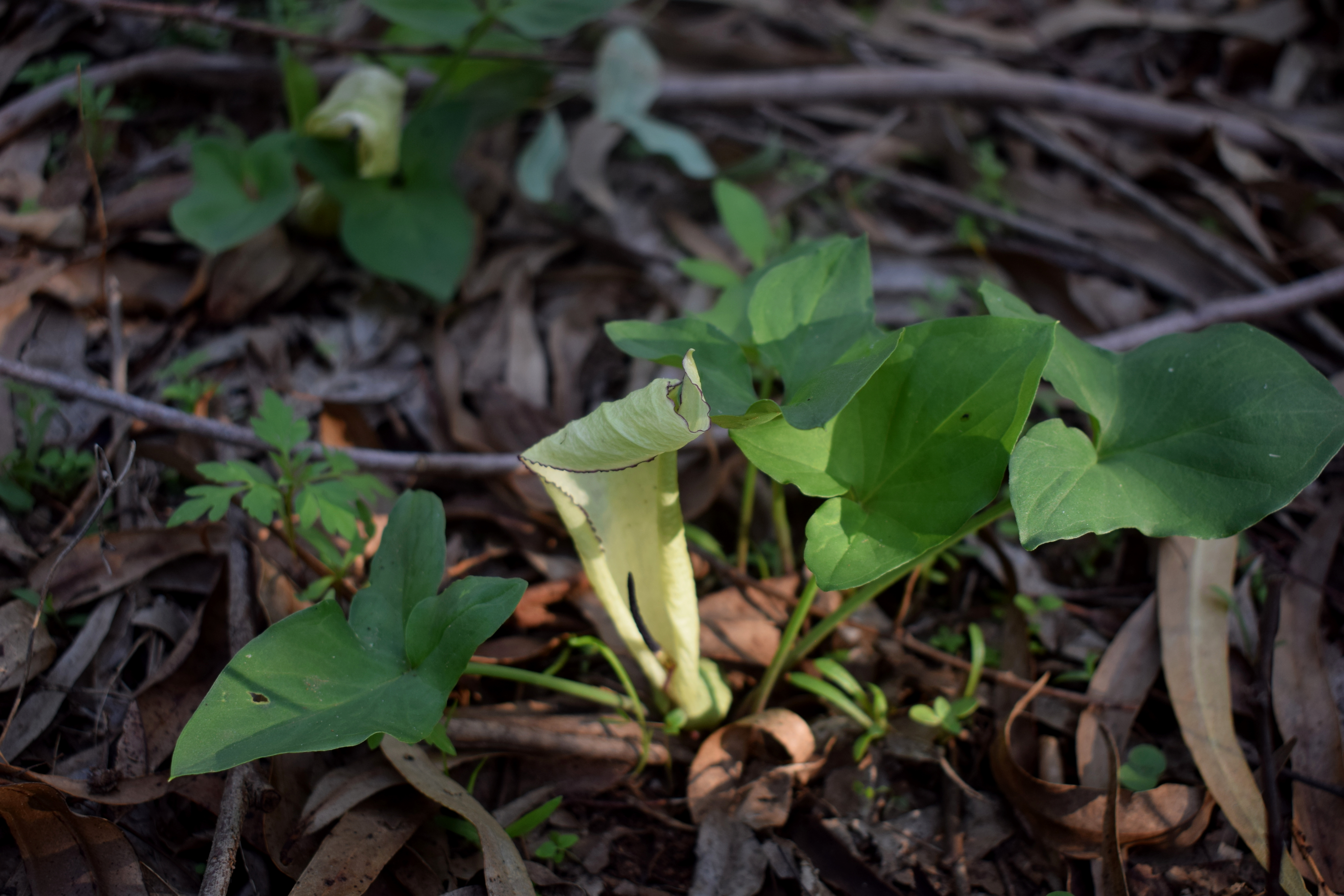
- Theriophonum minutum in Karnataka

Scientific classification
- Kingdom: Plantae
- Clade: Tracheophytes
- Clade: Angiosperms
- Clade: Monocots
- Order: Alismatales
- Family: Araceae
- Subfamily: Aroideae
- Tribe: Areae
- Genus: Theriophonum; Blume
- Range of the genus Theriophonum

Synonyms
- Tapinocarpus Dalzell; Calyptrocoryne Schott; Pauella Ramam. & Sebastine

= Theriophonum =

Genus of flowering plants

Theriophonum is a genus of flowering plants in the family Araceae. It is found only in India and Sri Lanka. The genus is closely related to Typhonium. The only apparent difference between the two is in how many ovules each have and the overall size of the plants. Typhoniums are bigger than Theriophonum.

== Species ==
As of February 2025, Plants of the World Online accepted these species:

- Theriophonum blumei Arulanandam, Soosairaj, P.Raja & Balaguru – Tamil Nadu
- Theriophonum dalzellii Schott – western India
- Theriophonum fischeri Sivad. – Kerala, Tamil Nadu
- Theriophonum infaustum N.E.Br. – Kerala
- Theriophonum minutum (Willd.) Baill. – central and southern India, Sri Lanka
- Theriophonum sivaganganum (Ramam. & Sebastine) Bogner – Tamil Nadu

== Gallery ==
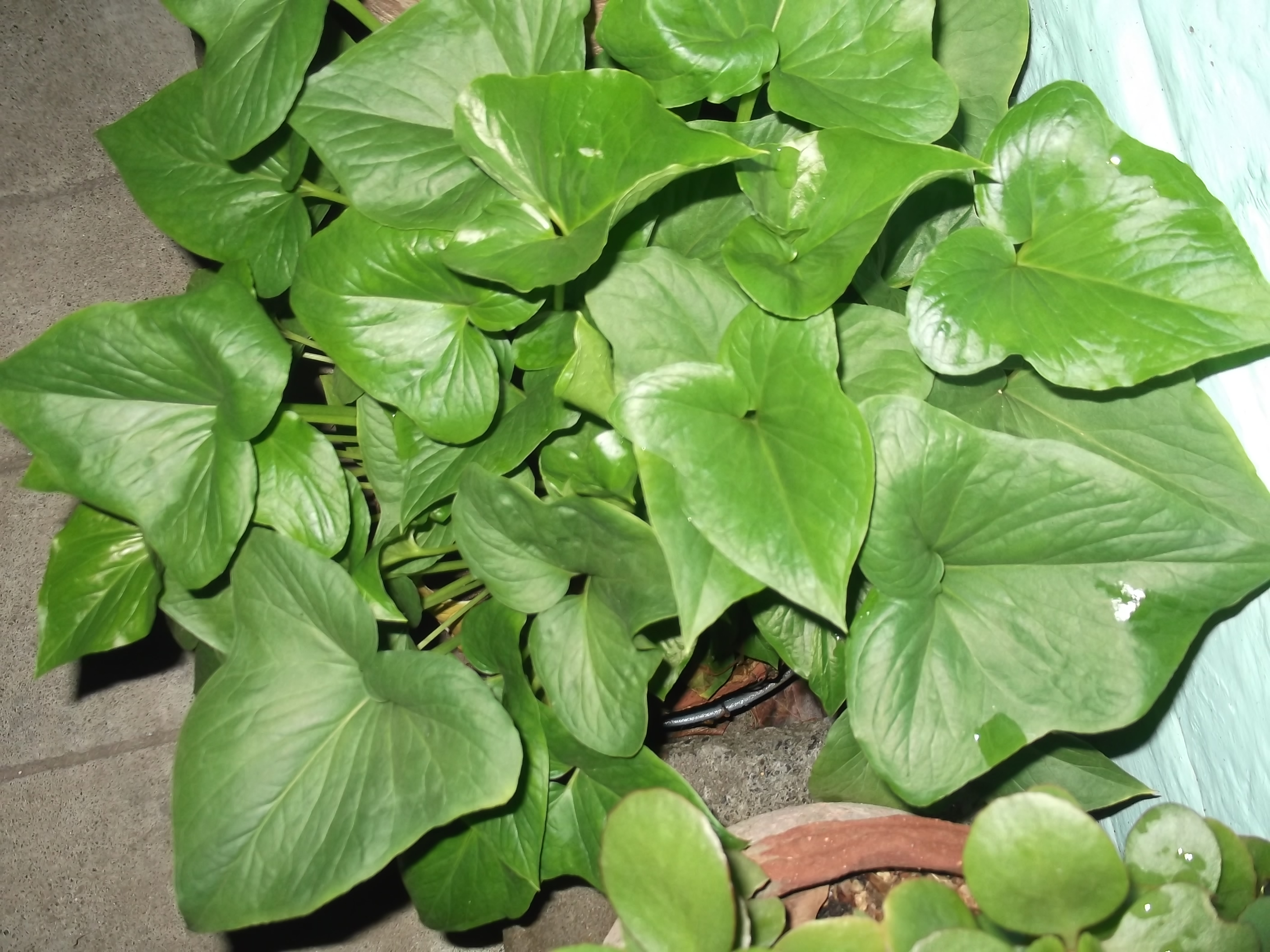
T. fischeri

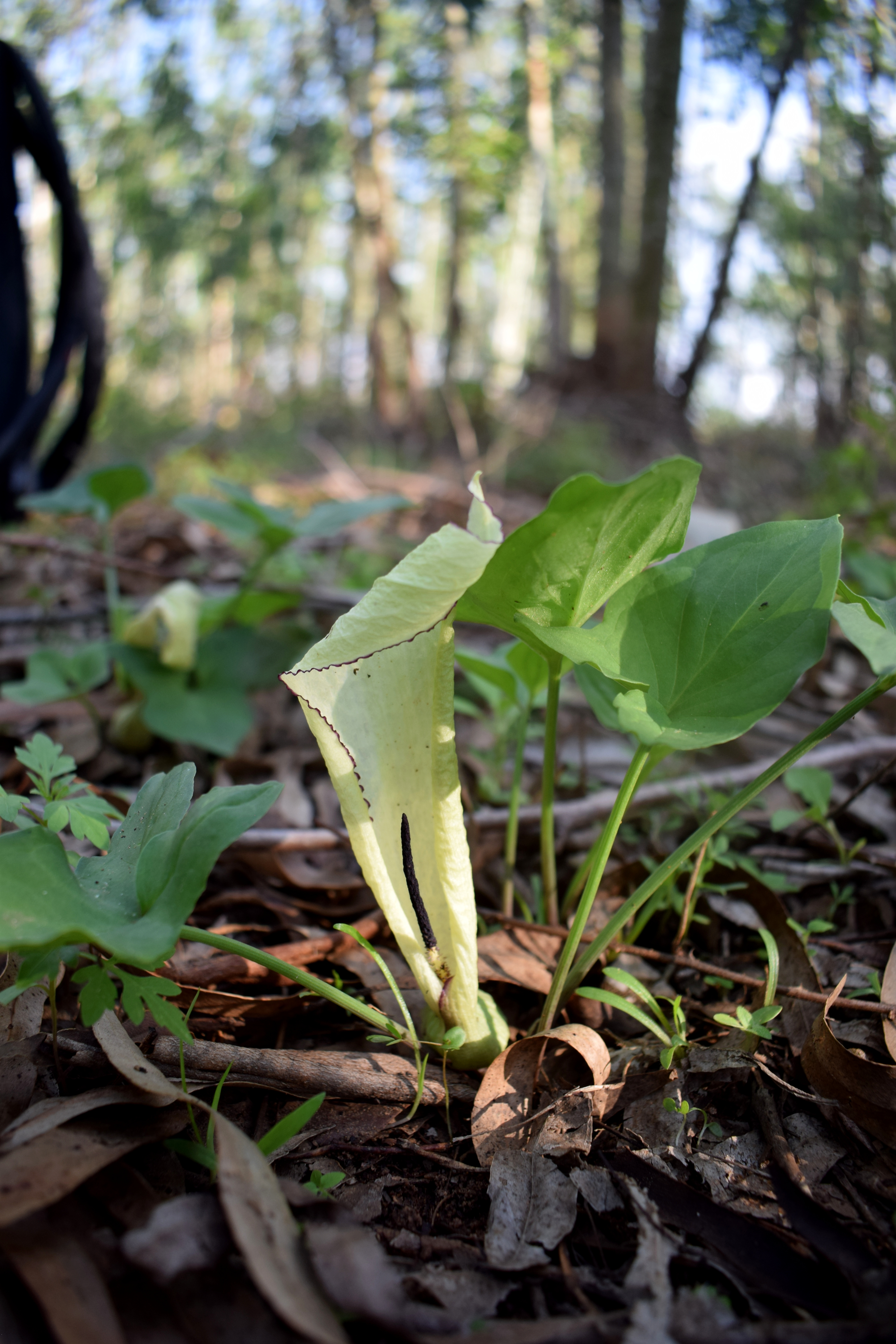
T. minutum
