= Filarum =

Scientific classification
- Kingdom: Plantae
- Clade: Tracheophytes
- Clade: Angiosperms
- Clade: Monocots
- Order: Alismatales
- Family: Araceae
- Subfamily: Aroideae
- Tribe: Caladieae
- Genus: Filarum; Nicolson
- Species: F. manserichense

Binomial name
- Filarum manserichense Nicolson

Species of plant

Filarum is a monotypic genus of flowering plants in the family Araceae. The single species making up the genus is Filarum manserichense. It is found growing in the amazonian region of northeastern Peru. Govaerts, R. & Frodin, D.G. (2002). World Checklist and Bibliography of Araceae (and Acoraceae): 1–560. The Board of Trustees of the Royal Botanic Gardens, Kew. The fertile male flowers of Filarum are unique in that they have hairlike attachment to them.
