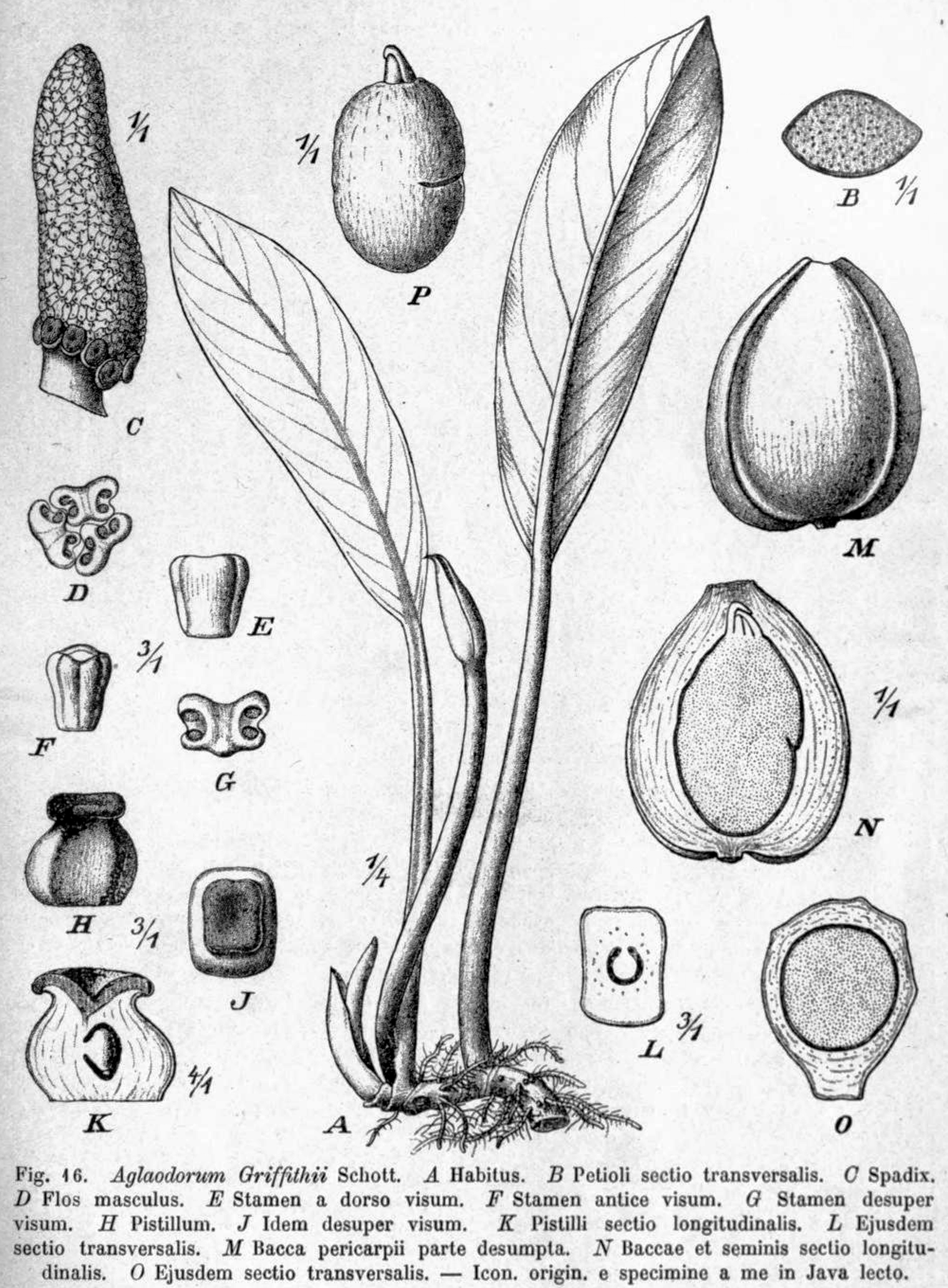
- Aglaodorum griffithi

Scientific classification
- Kingdom: Plantae
- Clade: Embryophytes
- Clade: Tracheophytes
- Clade: Angiosperms
- Clade: Monocots
- Order: Alismatales
- Family: Araceae
- Subfamily: Aroideae
- Tribe: Aglaonemateae
- Genus: Aglaodorum; Schott
- Species: A. griffithii

Binomial name
- Aglaodorum griffithii (Schott) Schott

= Aglaodorum =

Genus of flowering plants

Aglaodorum is a monotypic genus of flowering plants in the family Araceae. The only species that is a member of this genus is Aglaodorum griffithii.

Aglaodorum is extremely similar to species in the genus Aglaonema. One main differences that distinguishes Aglaodorum from species in Aglaonema is that it produces green fruit whereas Aglaonema species produce red fruit. Also, Aglaodorum has a longer peduncle and produces only one whorl of flowers instead of many as in Aglaonema.

Aglaodorum are found growing in tidal mudflats in Borneo, Sumatra, southern Indochina, and Peninsular Malaysia. It is usually found growing alongside of Cryptocoryne ciliata and Nypa fruticans. An interesting feature of the plant is that the seeds germinate before it drops from the plant. The seeds themselves tend to be quite large.
