= Phymatarum =

Scientific classification
- Kingdom: Plantae
- Clade: Tracheophytes
- Clade: Angiosperms
- Clade: Monocots
- Order: Alismatales
- Family: Araceae
- Subfamily: Aroideae
- Tribe: Schismatoglottideae
- Genus: Phymatarum; M.Hotta
- Species: P. borneense

Binomial name
- Phymatarum borneense M.Hotta

Synonyms
- Phymatarum montanum M.Hotta

Genus of flowering plants

Phymatarum is a genus of flowering plants in the family Araceae. It contains only one known species, Phymatarum borneense, native to Brunei and Sarawak on the Island of Borneo.
