= Bidayuha =

Scientific classification
- Kingdom: Plantae
- Clade: Tracheophytes
- Clade: Angiosperms
- Clade: Monocots
- Order: Alismatales
- Family: Araceae
- Genus: Bidayuha; S.Y.Wong & P.C.Boyce
- Species: B. crassispatha

Binomial name
- Bidayuha crassispatha S.Y.Wong & P.C.Boyce

Genus of flowering plants

Bidayuha is a genus of flowering plants belonging to the family Araceae. The only species is Bidayuha crassispatha.

Its native range is Borneo.
