= Gosong =

Scientific classification
- Kingdom: Plantae
- Clade: Tracheophytes
- Clade: Angiosperms
- Clade: Monocots
- Order: Alismatales
- Family: Araceae
- Subfamily: Aroideae
- Tribe: Schismatoglottideae
- Genus: Gosong; S.Y.Wong & P.C.Boyce
- Species: G. brevipedunculata

Binomial name
- Gosong brevipedunculata S.Y.Wong & P.C.Boyce

Synonyms
- Bakoa brevipedunculata (H.Okada & Y.Mori) S.Y.Wong; Hottarum brevipedunculatum H.Okada & Y.Mori; Piptospatha brevipedunculata (H.Okada & Y.Mori) Bogner & A.Hay

Genus of Araceae plants

Gosong is a genus of flowering plants in the family Araceae. It has only one currently accepted species, Gosong brevipedunculata, native to Borneo. G. brevipedunculata is a rheophyte living alongside fast‑moving streams.
