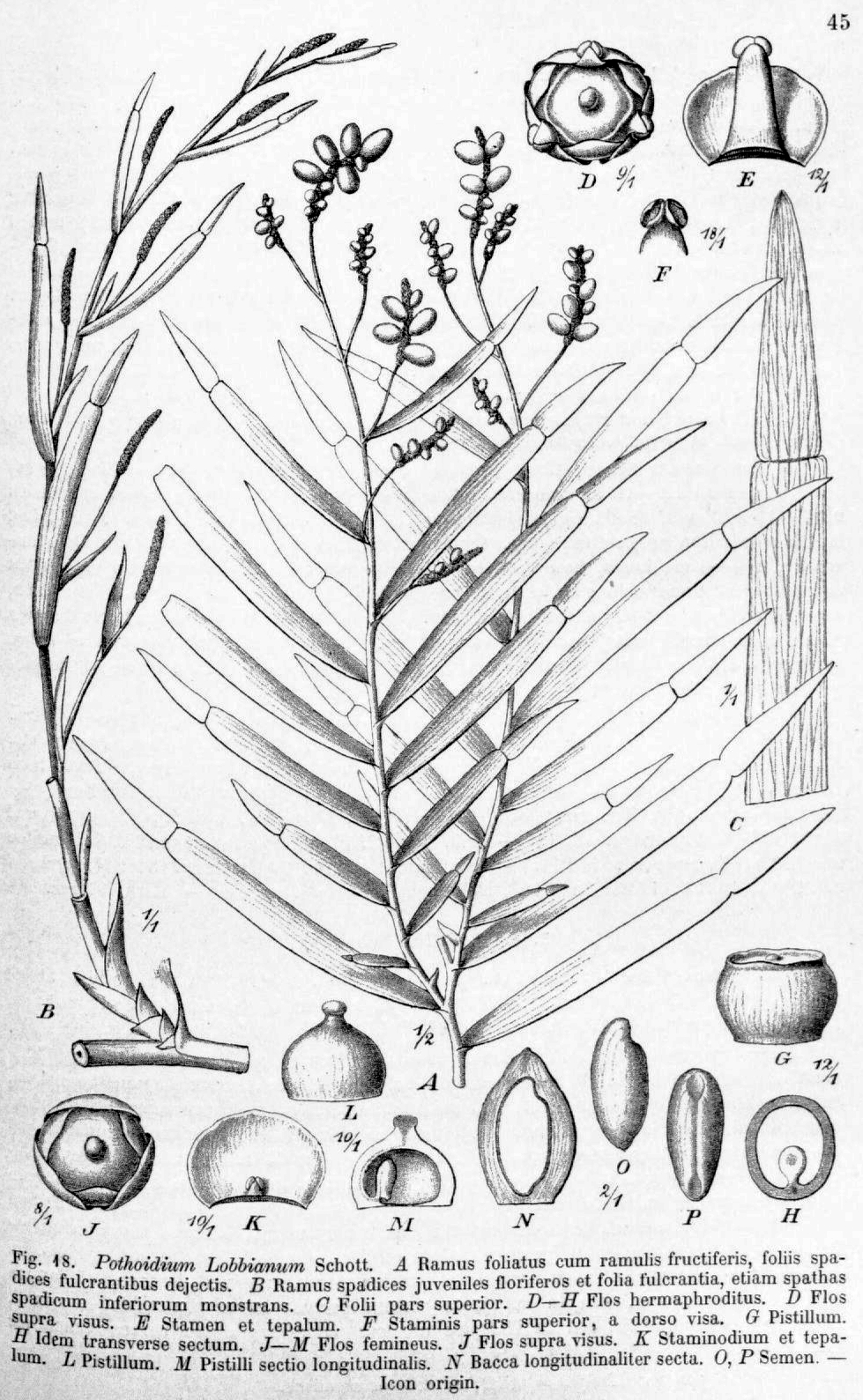
- 1905 illustration by Adolf Engler

Scientific classification
- Kingdom: Plantae
- Clade: Tracheophytes
- Clade: Angiosperms
- Clade: Monocots
- Order: Alismatales
- Family: Araceae
- Genus: Pothoidium
- Species: P. lobbianum

Binomial name
- Pothoidium lobbianum Schott

= Pothoidium =

Genus of plant in the family Araceae

Pothoidium is a monotypic genus (i.e. a genus that contains only one species) of flowering plants in the Calla Lily family Araceae. The single species that comprises the genus is Pothoidium lobbianum. It is native to Maluku, Sulawesi, the Philippines, and Lan Yü Island (Orchid Island) of Taiwan.
