= Zomicarpella =

Scientific classification
- Kingdom: Plantae
- Clade: Tracheophytes
- Clade: Angiosperms
- Clade: Monocots
- Order: Alismatales
- Family: Araceae
- Subfamily: Aroideae
- Tribe: Caladieae
- Genus: Zomicarpella; N.E.Br.

Genus of flowering plants

Zomicarpella is a genus of flowering plants in the family Araceae. It is native to Colombia, Peru and Brazil. The leaves are hastate or sagittate. The chromosome number for Zomicarpella species is 2n=26. Additionally, the seeds have an endosperm.

Species

- Zomicarpella amazonica Bogner - Amazonas State of northwestern Brazil
- Zomicarpella maculata N.E.Br. - Colombia, Peru
