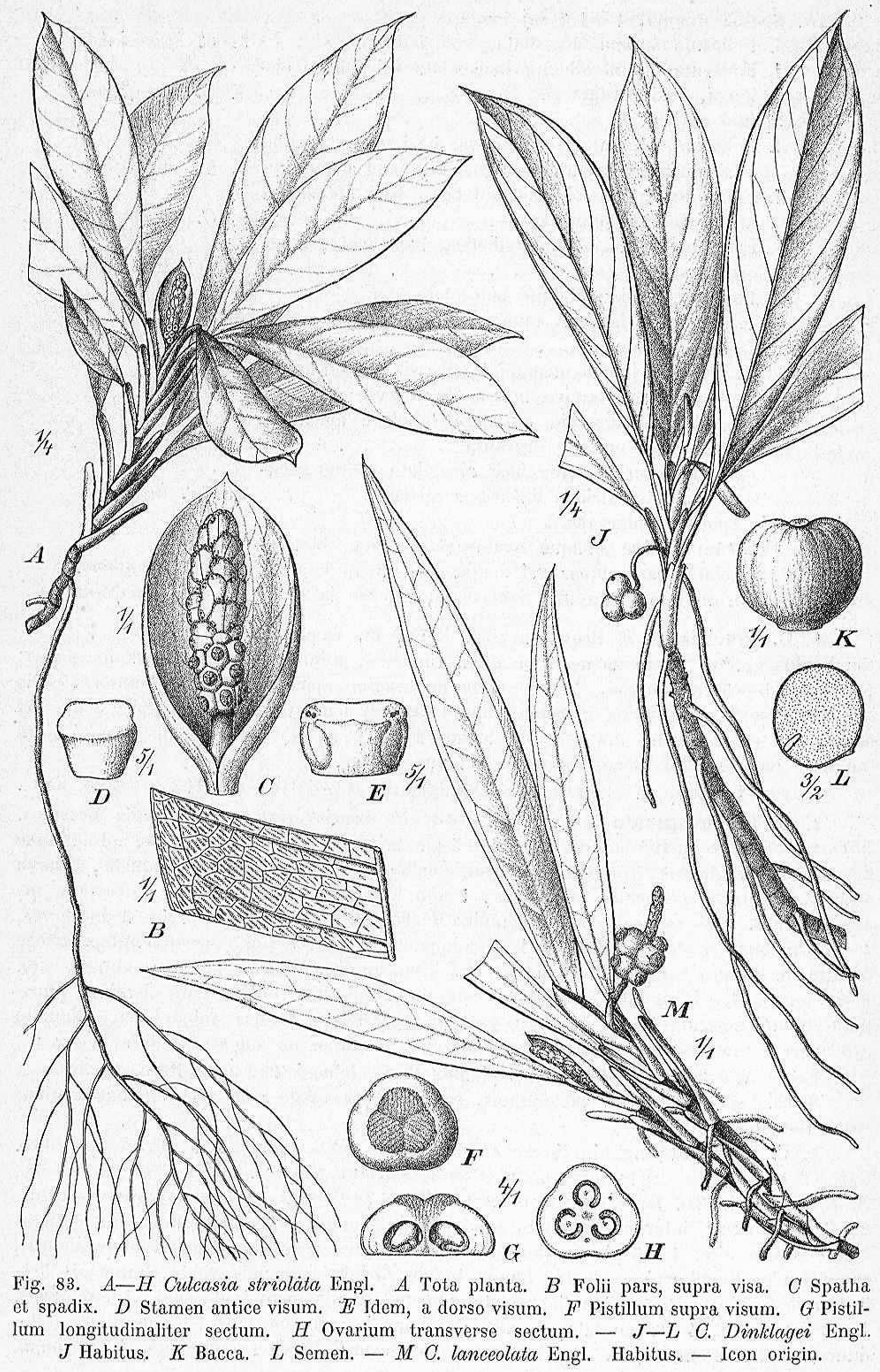
- Culcasia striolata

Scientific classification
- Kingdom: Plantae
- Clade: Tracheophytes
- Clade: Angiosperms
- Clade: Monocots
- Order: Alismatales
- Family: Araceae
- Subfamily: Aroideae
- Tribe: Culcasieae
- Genus: Culcasia; P. Beauv., 1803

Synonyms
- Denhamia Schott

= Culcasia =

Genus of flowering plants

Culcasia is a genus of flowering plants in the family Araceae, native to tropical Africa. Most of its species are climbers and resemble Cercestis, except that they do not produce flagella.

Species

- Culcasia angolensis Welw. ex Schott - western + central Africa from Senegal to Angola
- Culcasia annetii Ntépé-Nyamè - Ivory Coast, Cameroon, Liberia
- Culcasia bosii Ntépé-Nyamè - Cameroon, Gabon, Congo-Brazzaville
- Culcasia brevipetiolata Bogner - Gabon
- Culcasia caudata Engl. - Zaïre
- Culcasia dinklagei Engl - western + central Africa from Liberia to Zaïre
- Culcasia ekongoloi Ntépé-Nyamè - central Africa from Nigeria to Zaïre
- Culcasia falcifolia Engl. - central Africa from Gabon east to Tanzania and south to Mozambique
- Culcasia glandulosa Hepper - Ivory Coast, Sierra Leone, Liberia, Congo-Brazzaville
- Culcasia insulana N.E.Br. - Zaïre, Cameroon, Gulf of Guinea Islands
- Culcasia lanceolata Engl. - Cameroon, Gabon
- Culcasia liberica N.E.Br. - Ivory Coast, Sierra Leone, Liberia, Togo
- Culcasia linearifolia Bogner - Cameroon, Gabon
- Culcasia loukandensis Pellegr - Cameroon, Gabon, Congo-Brazzaville, Zaïre, Central African Republic
- Culcasia mannii (Hook.f.) Engl. - Cameroon, Gabon, Congo-Brazzaville, Nigeria, Equatorial Guinea
- Culcasia obliquifolia Engl. - Cameroon, Gabon
- Culcasia orientalis Mayo - Kenya, Tanzania, Mozambique, Zambia
- Culcasia panduriformis Engl. & K.Krause - Cameroon, Gabon
- Culcasia parviflora N.E.Br. - western + central Africa from Liberia to Zaïre
- Culcasia rotundifolia Bogner - Gabon
- Culcasia sanagensis Ntépé-Nyamè - Cameroon
- Culcasia scandens P.Beauv. - western + central Africa from Liberia to Angola
- Culcasia seretii De Wild - western + central Africa from Liberia to Zaïre
- Culcasia simiarum Ntépé-Nyamè - western Africa from Ivory Coast to Cameroon
- Culcasia striolata Engl. - western + central Africa from Liberia to Congo-Brazzaville
- Culcasia tenuifolia Engl. - western + central Africa from Liberia to Zaïre
- Culcasia yangambiensis Louis & Mullend. - Congo-Brazzaville, Zaïre
