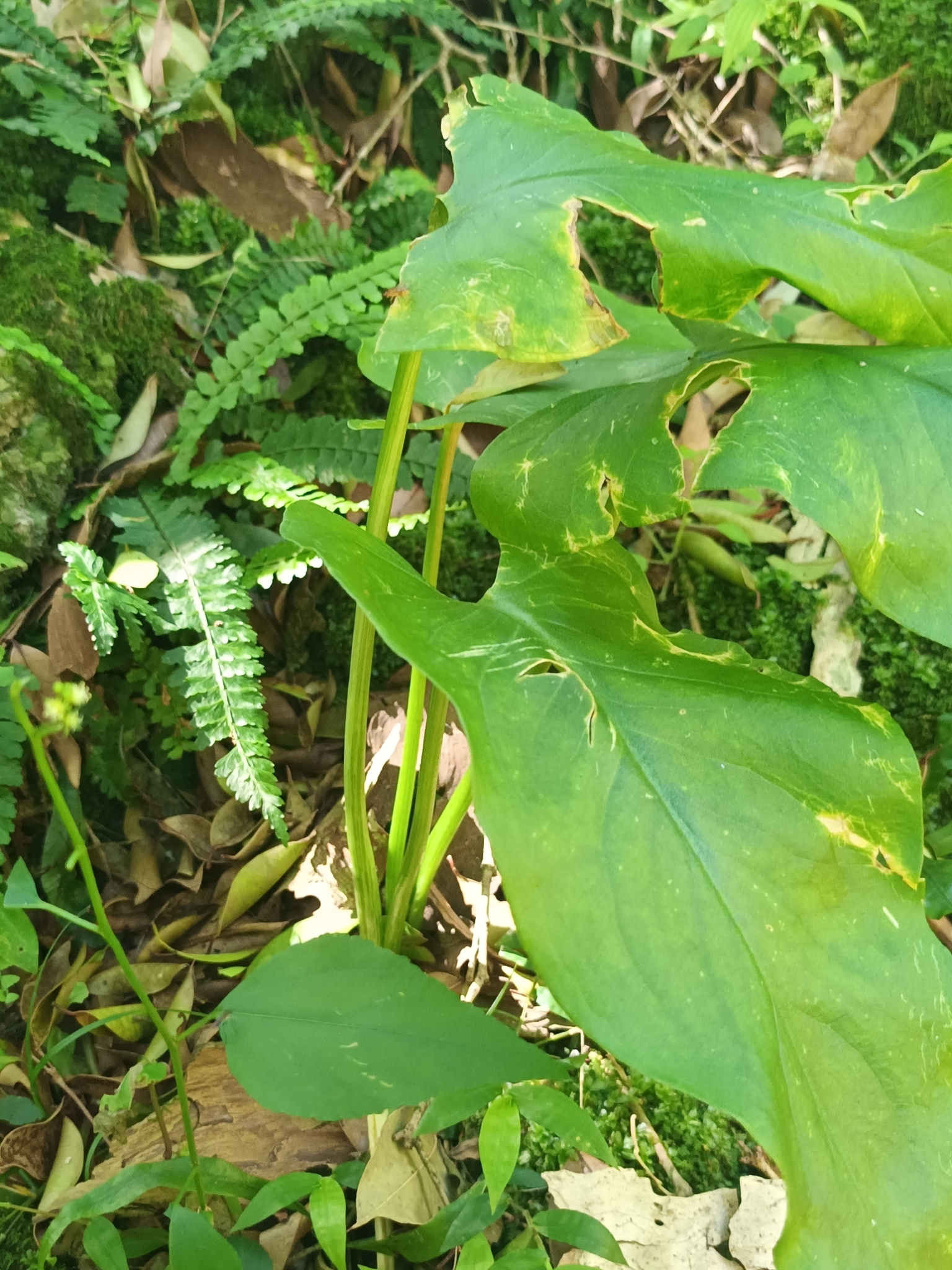
- Mangonia tweedieana in Uruguay

Scientific classification
- Kingdom: Plantae
- Clade: Tracheophytes
- Clade: Angiosperms
- Clade: Monocots
- Order: Alismatales
- Family: Araceae
- Subfamily: Aroideae
- Tribe: Spathicarpeae
- Genus: Mangonia; Schott 1857

Synonyms
- Felipponia Hicken; Felipponiella Hicken

= Mangonia =

Genus of flowering plants

Mangonia is a genus of flowering plants in the family Araceae. The genus contains only two known species native to southern Brazil and Uruguay.

- Mangonia tweedieana Schott. - Brazil (Rio Grande do Sul), Uruguay
- Mangonia uruguaya (Hicken) Bogner - Cerro Largo in Uruguay
