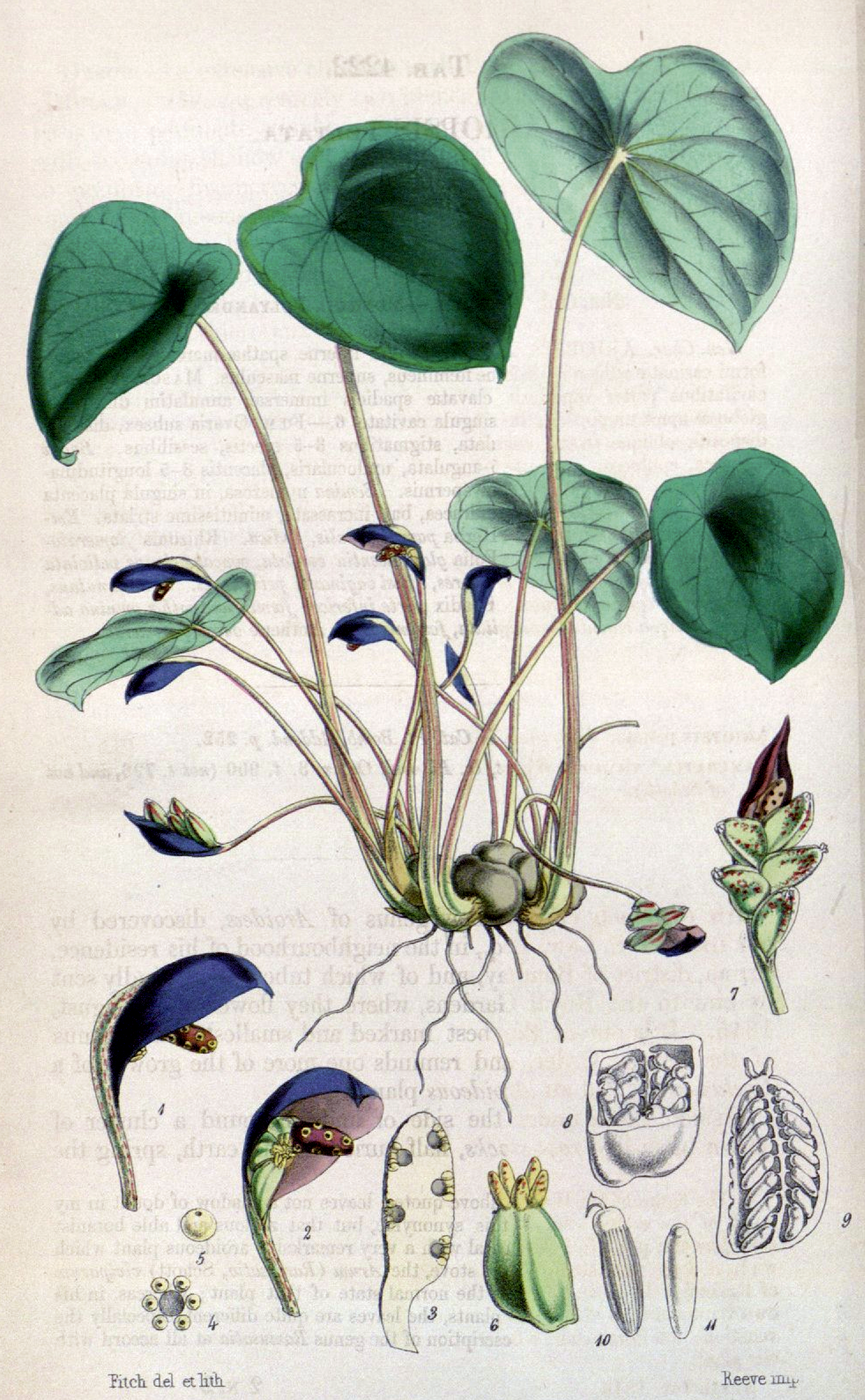
- Ariopsis peltata

Scientific classification
- Kingdom: Plantae
- Clade: Tracheophytes
- Clade: Angiosperms
- Clade: Monocots
- Order: Alismatales
- Family: Araceae
- Subfamily: Aroideae
- Tribe: Colocasieae
- Genus: Ariopsis; Nimmo
- Range of the genus Ariopsis.

= Ariopsis (plant) =

Genus of flowering plants

Ariopsis is a genus of flowering plants in the family Araceae. There are only two species of plants in the genus namely Ariopsis peltata and Ariopsis protanthera. Both species are found in the understories of tropical forests, but they both live in different areas. Ariopsis peltata is found in the Western Ghats, whereas Ariopsis protanthera is found in Nepal, Bhutan, Assam, northern Bangladesh, Myanmar and Thailand. Ariopsis has heart shaped leaves and are tuberous plants. The spadix is cylindrical and has cavities into which the pollen falls into.
