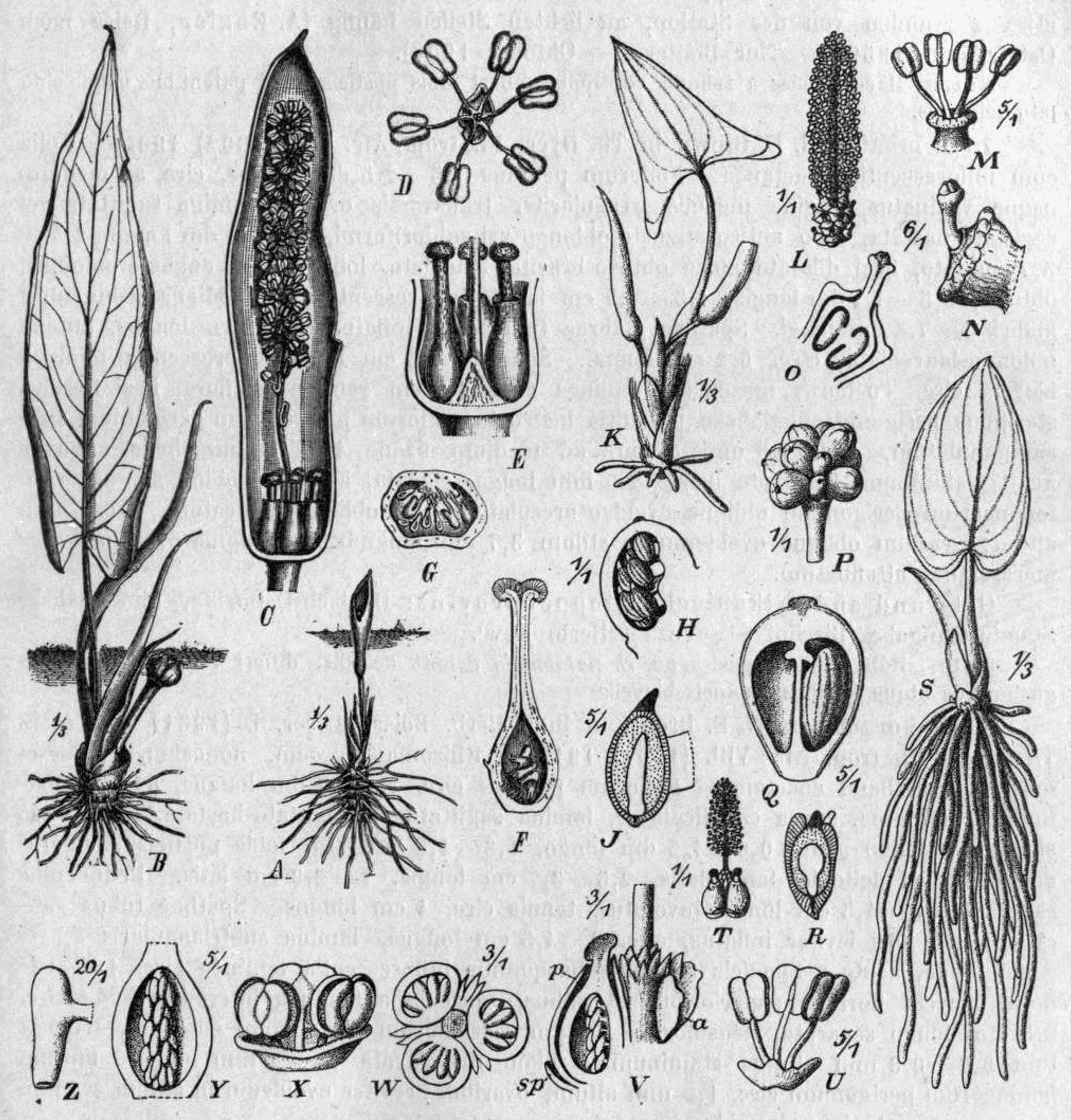
- Stylochaeton spp.

Scientific classification
- Kingdom: Plantae
- Clade: Tracheophytes
- Clade: Angiosperms
- Clade: Monocots
- Order: Alismatales
- Family: Araceae
- Subfamily: Aroideae
- Tribe: Stylochaetoneae; Schott
- Genus: Stylochaeton; Lepr.

Synonyms
- Gueinzia Sond. ex Schott

= Stylochaeton =

Genus of flowering plants

Stylochaeton is a genus of flowering plants in the family Araceae that is native to Africa. Stylochaeton are rhizomatous with hastate leaves. Flowering in this genus is said to be quite uncommon. Stylochaeton is the sole genus in the tribe Stylochaetoneae.

== Species ==
1. Stylochaeton angolense Engl. - Angola
2. Stylochaeton bogneri Mayo - Kenya, Tanzania
3. Stylochaeton borumense N.E.Br. - Kenya, Tanzania, Mozambique, Zambia
4. Stylochaeton crassispathum Bogner - Tanzania
5. Stylochaeton cuculliferum Peter - Zaïre, Tanzania, Zambia, Malawi
6. Stylochaeton euryphyllum Mildbr. - Tanzania, Mozambique
7. Stylochaeton grande N.E.Br. - Somalia
8. Stylochaeton hypogeum Lepr. - Benin, Burkina Faso, Ivory Coast, Mauritania, Senegal, Nigeria, Chad, Ethiopia, Sudan
9. Stylochaeton kornasii Malaisse & Bamps - Zaïre
10. Stylochaeton lancifolium Kotschy & Peyr. - Benin, Burkina Faso, Guinea, Ivory Coast, Mali, Nigeria, Niger, Senegal, Togo, Cameroon, Central African Republic, Chad, Sudan
11. Stylochaeton malaissei Bogner - Zaïre
12. Stylochaeton milneanum Mayo - Tanzania
13. Stylochaeton natalense Schott - Tanzania, Malawi, Mozambique, Zimbabwe, Eswatini, northern South Africa
14. Stylochaeton oligocarpum Riedl. - Ogaden region of eastern Ethiopia
15. Stylochaeton pilosum Bogner - Sierra Leone
16. Stylochaeton puberulum N.E.Br. - Kenya, Tanzania, Mozambique, Zambia, Zimbabwe
17. Stylochaeton salaamicum N.E.Br. - Kenya, Tanzania
18. Stylochaeton shabaense Malaisse & Bamps - Zaïre
19. Stylochaeton tortispathum Bogner & Haigh - Mozambique
20. Stylochaeton zenkeri Engl - Zaïre, Congo-Brazzaville, Equatorial Guinea, Cameroon, Sierra Leone
