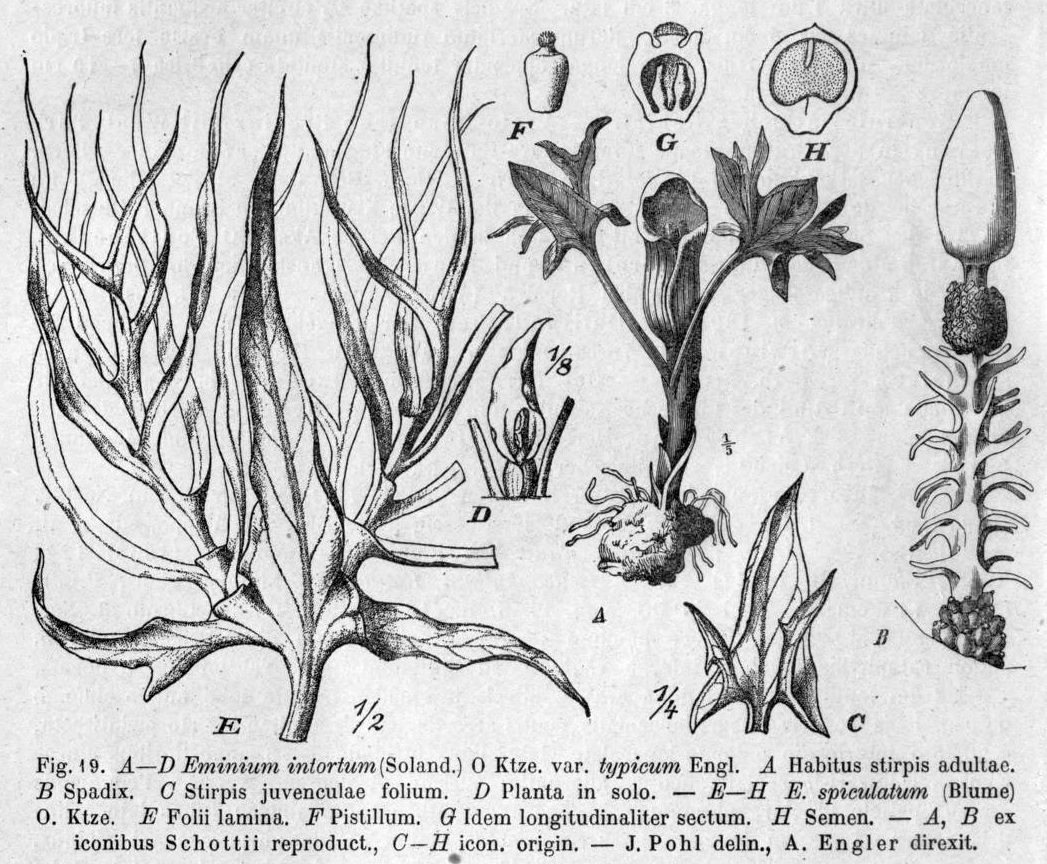
- Eminium intortum

Scientific classification
- Kingdom: Plantae
- Clade: Tracheophytes
- Clade: Angiosperms
- Clade: Monocots
- Order: Alismatales
- Family: Araceae
- Subfamily: Aroideae
- Tribe: Areae
- Genus: Eminium; Schott
- Range of the genus Eminium.

Synonyms
- Helicophyllum Schott

= Eminium =

Genus of flowering plants

Eminium is a genus of flowering plants in the family Araceae. The genus ranges from Turkey and Egypt east to Central Asia. Usually they can be found growing in barren areas in sand or stony soil. The foliage of Eminium resembles Helicodiceros and its inflorescence and fruit resembles those of Biarum.

Species

- Eminium albertii (Regel) Engl. - Turkmenistan, Uzbekistan, Afghanistan
- Eminium heterophyllum (Blume) Schott - Iran, Iraq, Turkey
- Eminium intortum (Banks & Sol.) Kuntze - Turkey, Syria
- Eminium jaegeri Bogner & P.C.Boyce - Iran
- Eminium koenenianum Lobin & P.C.Boyce - Turkey
- Eminium lehmannii (Bunge) Kuntze - Kazakhstan, Kyrgyzstan, Turkmenistan, Uzbekistan, Afghanistan, Tajikistan
- Eminium rauwolffii (Blume) Schott - Turkey, Syria
- Eminium regelii Vved. - Kazakhstan, Kyrgyzstan, Tajikistan, Uzbekistan
- Eminium spiculatum (Blume) Schott - Egypt, Israel, Palestine, Jordan, Lebanon, Syria, Iraq, Iran

== Gallery ==
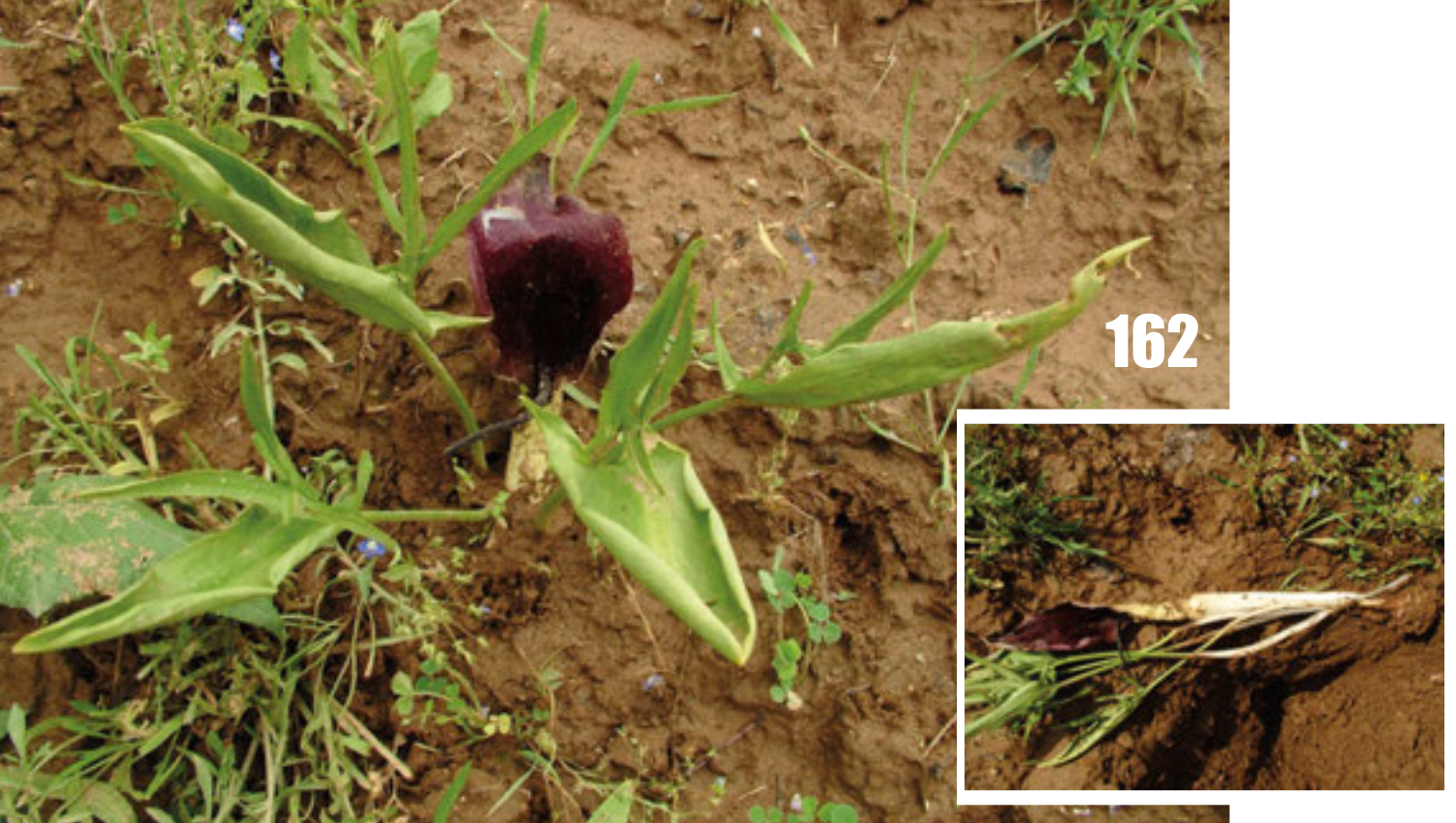
E. albertii

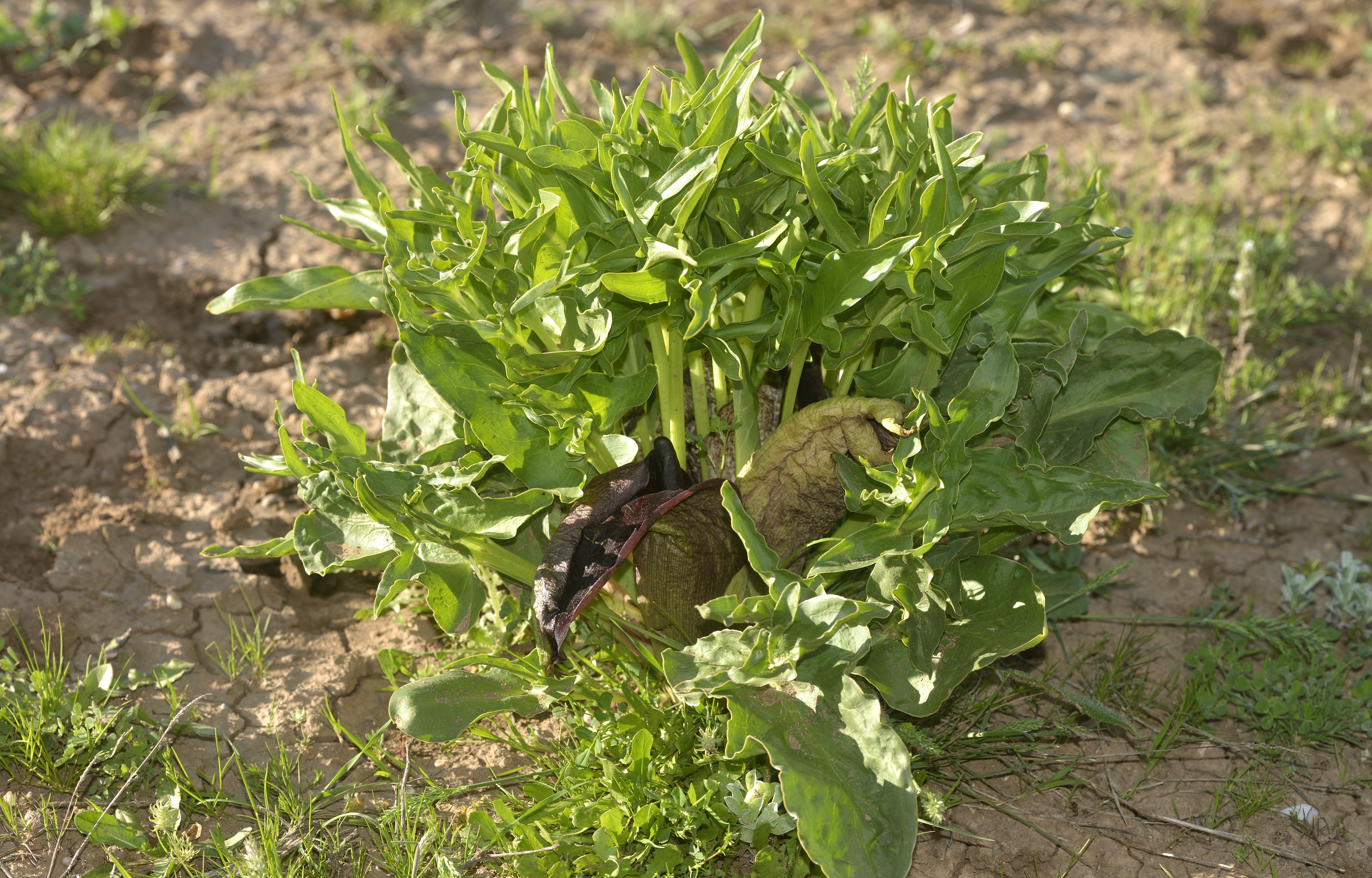
E. intortum

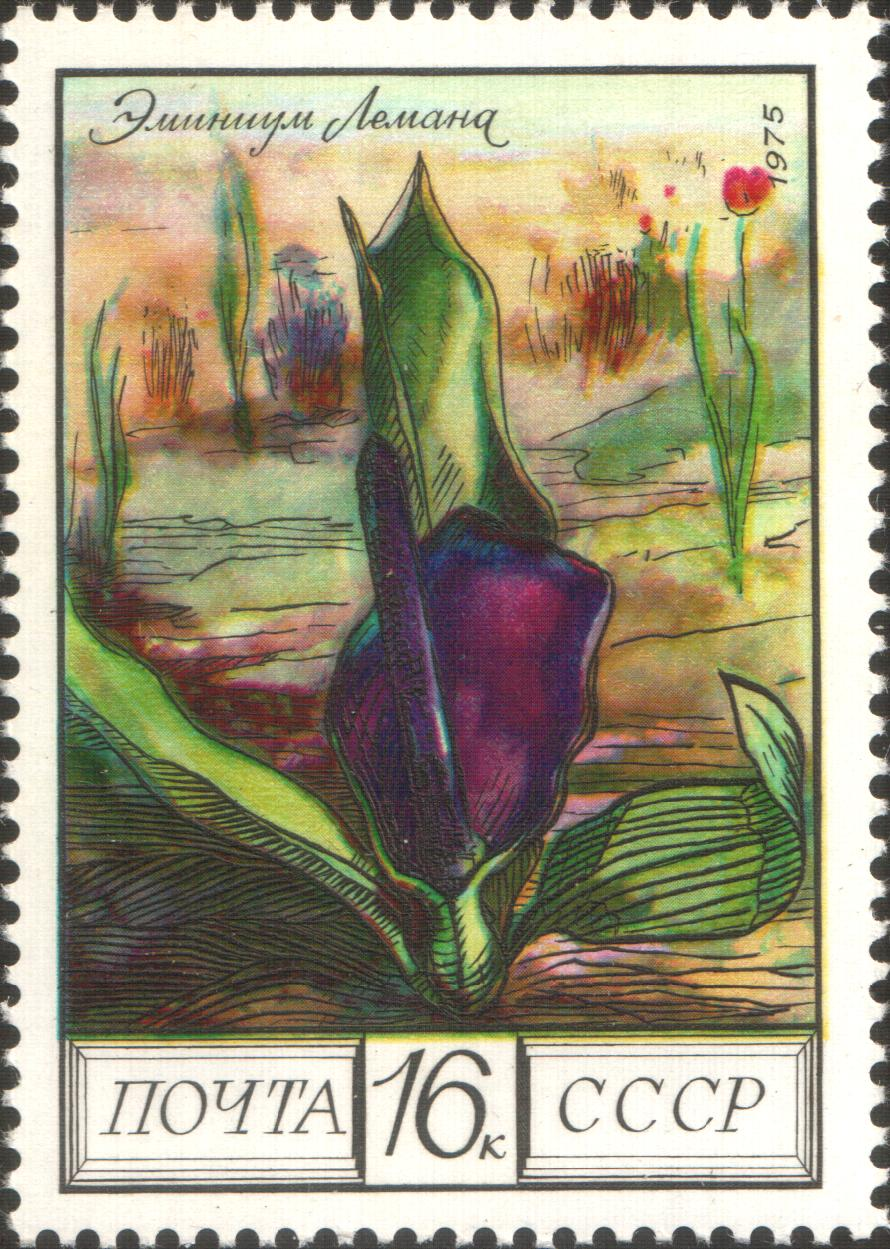
E. lehmannii

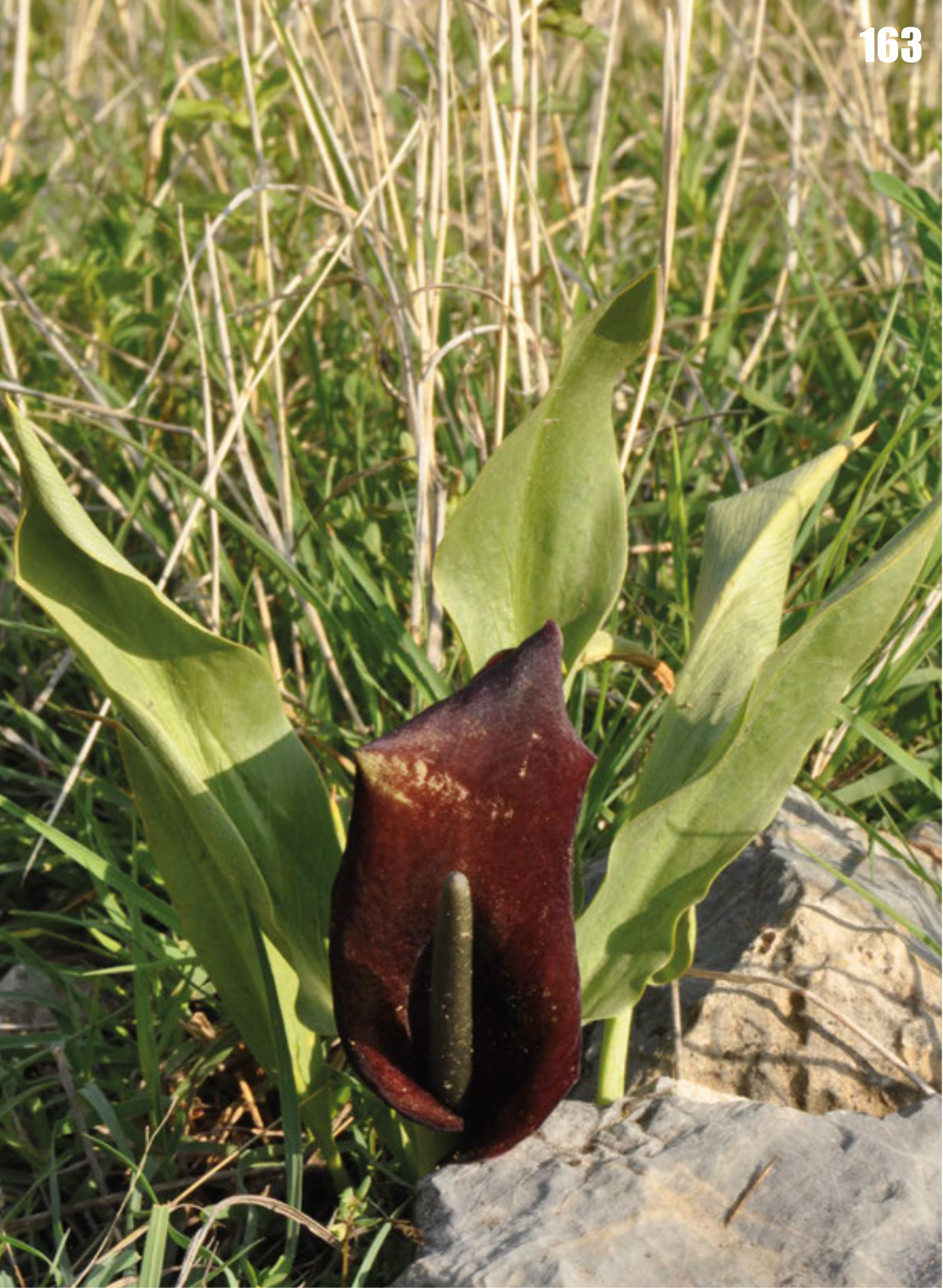
E. regelii

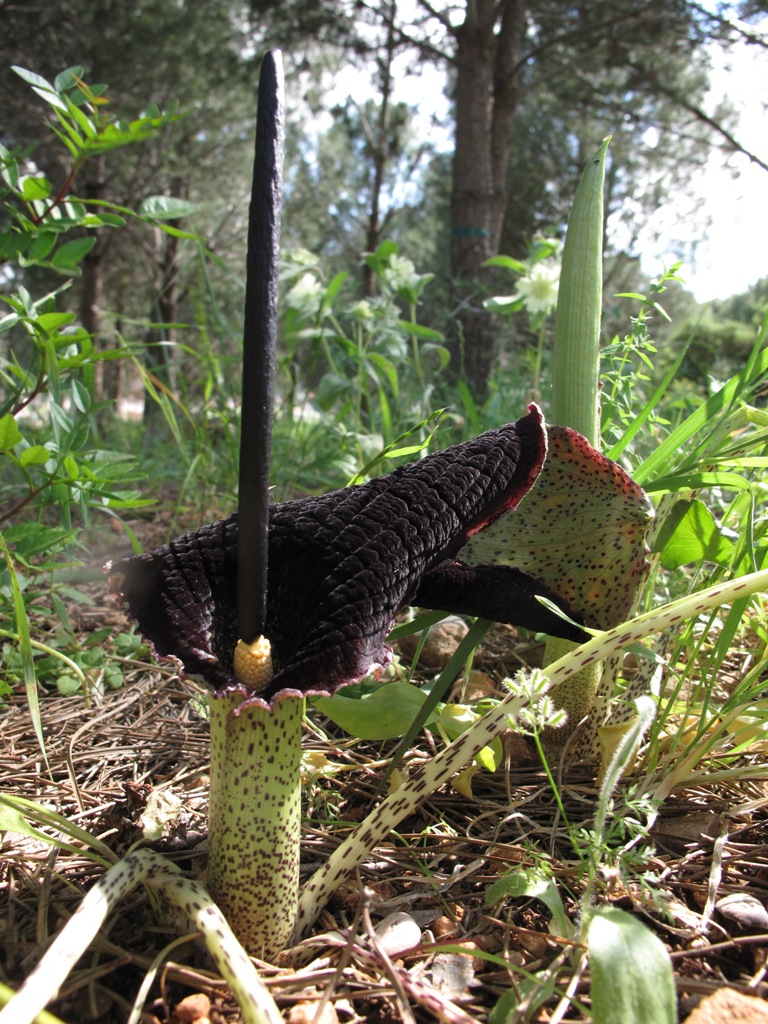
E. spiculatum
