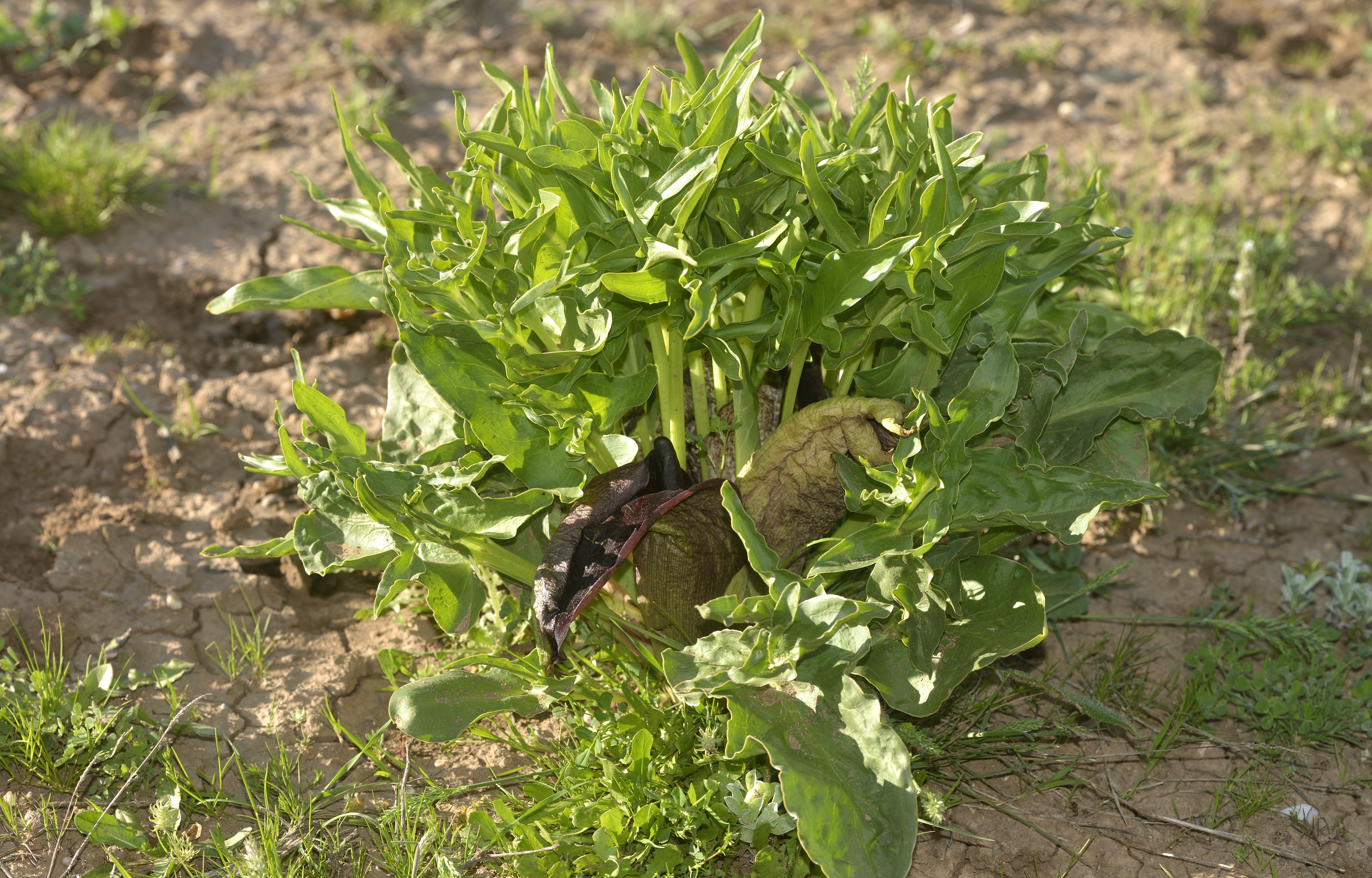
- Photograph
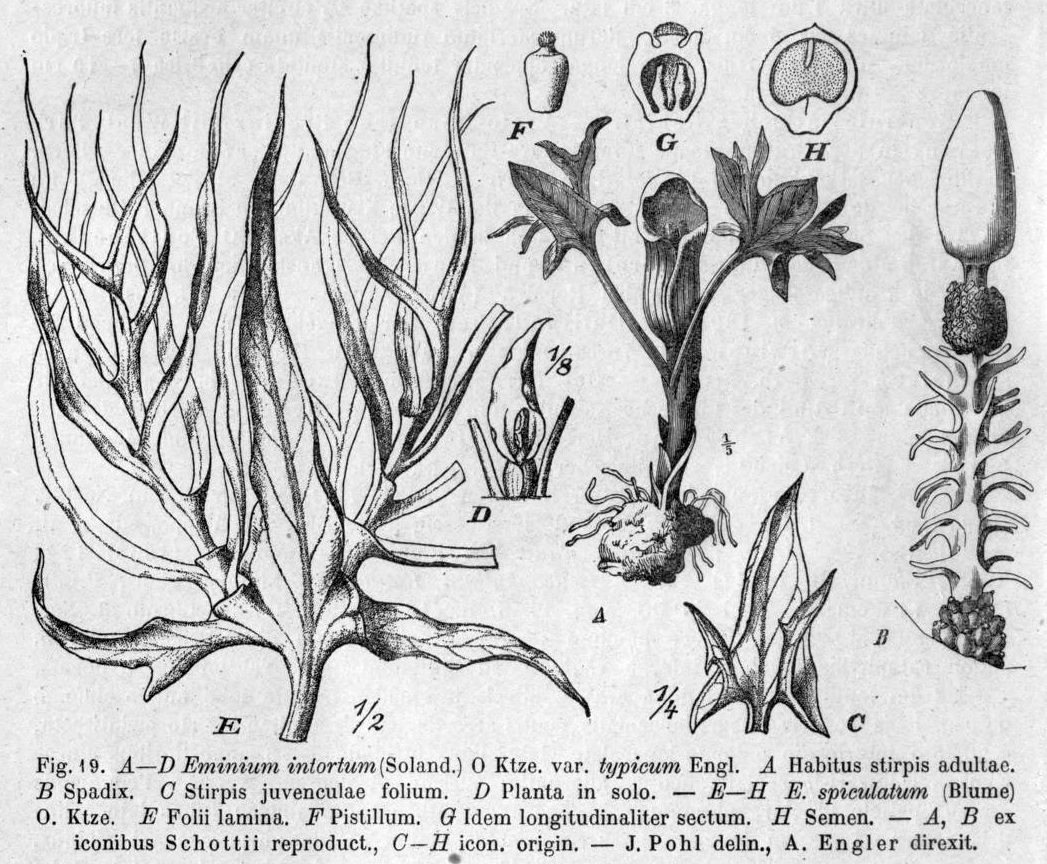
- Botanical illustration

Scientific classification
- Kingdom: Plantae
- Clade: Tracheophytes
- Clade: Angiosperms
- Clade: Monocots
- Order: Alismatales
- Family: Araceae
- Genus: Eminium
- Species: E. intortum

Binomial name
- Eminium intortum (Banks & Sol.) Kuntze

= Eminium intortum =

Species of flowering plant

Eminium intortum is a species of plant in the family Araceae. It is a cormous geophyte native to Turkey and the northern Levant.

== Description ==
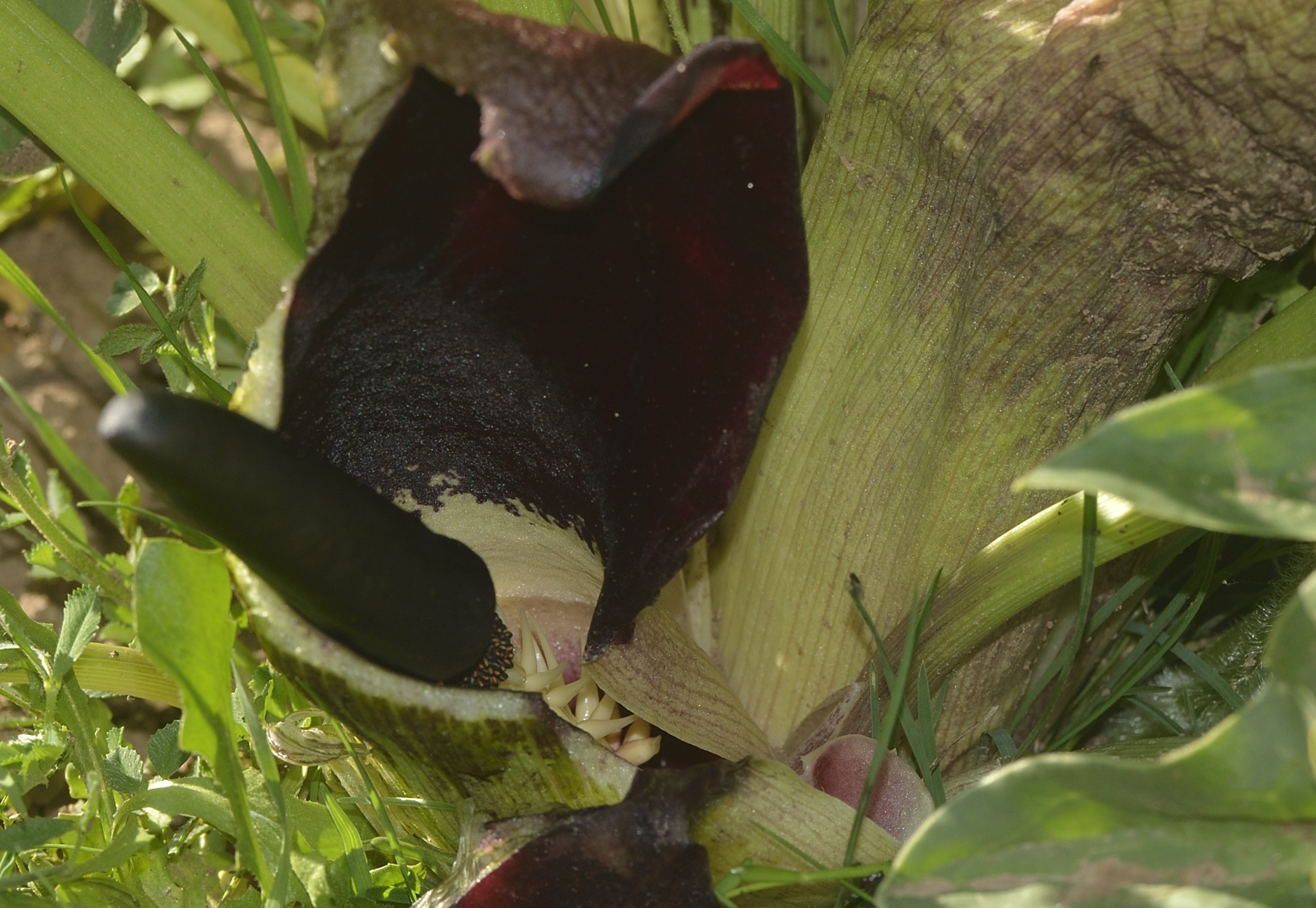
Flower detail

Perennial geophyte. Colms globose.

Purplish-red stems usually 11–18 cm long, but may appear acaulescent. The stem lacks speckes and generally becomes violet-colored toward the base. Scapes are 6–15 cm long, thickening around the lower region of the spathe. Leaves petiolate and hastate, with lateral veins that branch out toward the midsection of the leaf blade upon separation from the middle vein. Basal lobes are linear and come to a point, curling upward. The lower blade of the leaf generally has blackish-brown speckles.

It can be distinguished from E. rauwolffii by its leaves: its posterior leaf lobes may fragment into secondary lobes, unlike those of E. rauwolfii.

Flower with spathe, purplish, brownish, or reddish black, purplish, or reddish on the inside, green on the outside. Inner surface of spathe is velvety textured. Glabrous 5-8[-10] mm long spadix, with 11–13 mm long pistil. Sterile zone 20-24-35 mm lon long, stamen 7-8[-10] mm long, and sterile flowers 4–5 mm long. Appendix is cylindrical, conical, dark brown or blackish purple, with short stems.

Fruit is grape-like in texture.

Pollen 46.07 μm in diameter, covered with spines 2.37 μm in height.

== Taxonomy ==
A 2021 phenogram placed it closest to E. spiculatum, but a genetic study has yet to be undertaken (apart from its use as an outgroup).

== Distribution and habitat ==
It is found native in Turkey, Lebanon, and Syria.

It grows on rocky slopes at an elevation of 820–1700 m.

== Ecology ==
Flowers April–May.

== History ==
It was first described as Arum intortum in 1794 by Joseph Banks and Daniel Solander in Volume II of the 2nd edition of Alexander Russel's The Natural History of Aleppo.

== Uses ==
A 2023 study aimed at metabolite profiling was the first mass spectrometry of the species, and identified the extract of its flowers as a strong cholinesterase inhibitor.

=== Toxicity ===
A case of poisoning occurred in the countryside of Edessa when a girl consumed about 50 g of the corm of the plant raw, (Note: Normally the corms of Araceae species are only eaten cooked, to destroy the painful raphides they contain.) developing SOB, a swollen tongue, a burning sensation in the mouth, hypersalivation, and eventually aphthous lesions and a necrotic wound on the underside of the tongue.

== Literature ==
- Güner, A.; et al. (2018). Resimli Türkiye Florası [Illustrated Flora of Turkey] (in Turkish). Vol. 2.
- Güner, A. (2012). Türkiye Bitkileri Listesi.
- Davis, P. H. (1984). Flora of Turkey and East Aegean Islands. Vol. 8.
- Mouterde, P. (1966). Nouv. Fl. Liban Syrie. Vol. 1.
