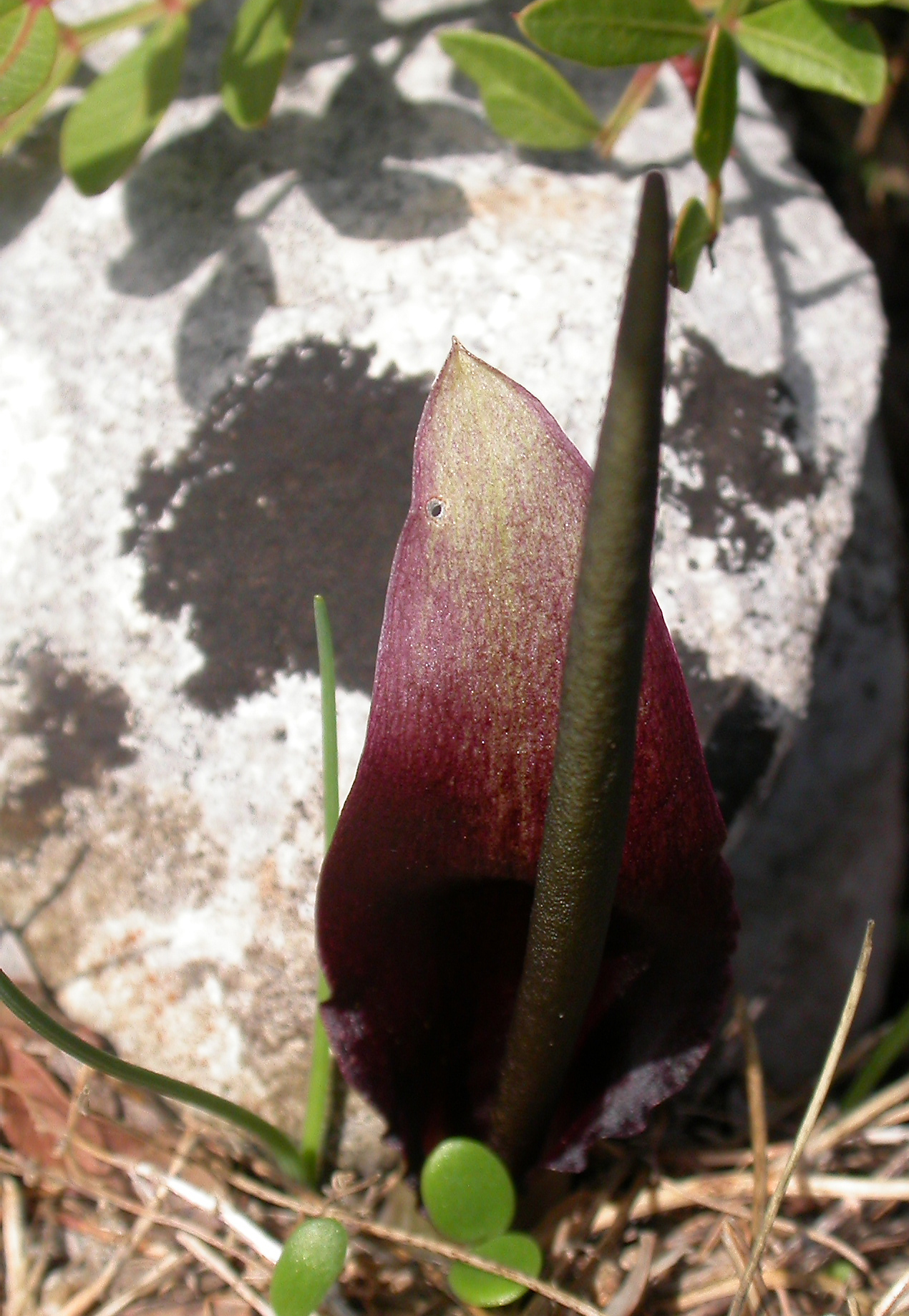
- Biarum tenuifolium subsp. abbreviatum flowering

Scientific classification
- Kingdom: Plantae
- Clade: Tracheophytes
- Clade: Angiosperms
- Clade: Monocots
- Order: Alismatales
- Family: Araceae
- Genus: Biarum
- Species: B. tenuifolium

Binomial name
- Biarum tenuifolium (L.) Schott

Synonyms
- Arum tenuifolium L.; Arum gramineum Lam.; Biarum constrictum C.Koch; Biarum anguillare Schott; Homaida tenuifolia (L.) Kuntze; Stenurus tenuifolium (L.) Salisb.

= Biarum tenuifolium =

Species of flowering plant in the arum family

Biarum tenuifolium is a cormous flowering plant species in the family Araceae.

== Taxonomy ==
Within the genus Biarum, it is the only species in subgenus Biarum.

=== Subspecies ===
Six subspecies are generally recognized:

- Biarum tenuifolium subsp. tenuifolium: southern Italy to the southern Balkans.
- Biarum tenuifolium subsp. zelebori: Greece and south-western Turkey.
- Biarum tenuifolium subsp. arundanum: heavy terra rossa soils in Portugal and Spain
- Biarum tenuifolium subsp. galianii: loose sandy soils in south-western Spain.
- Biarum tenuifolium subsp. abbreviatum: Central Mediterranean, from Italy to Greece.
- Biarum tenuifolium subsp. idomenaeum: Crete.

Subspecies arundanum and galianii have also been treated as two independent species (Biarum arundanum and Biarum galianii), or lumped together under Biarum arundanum.
