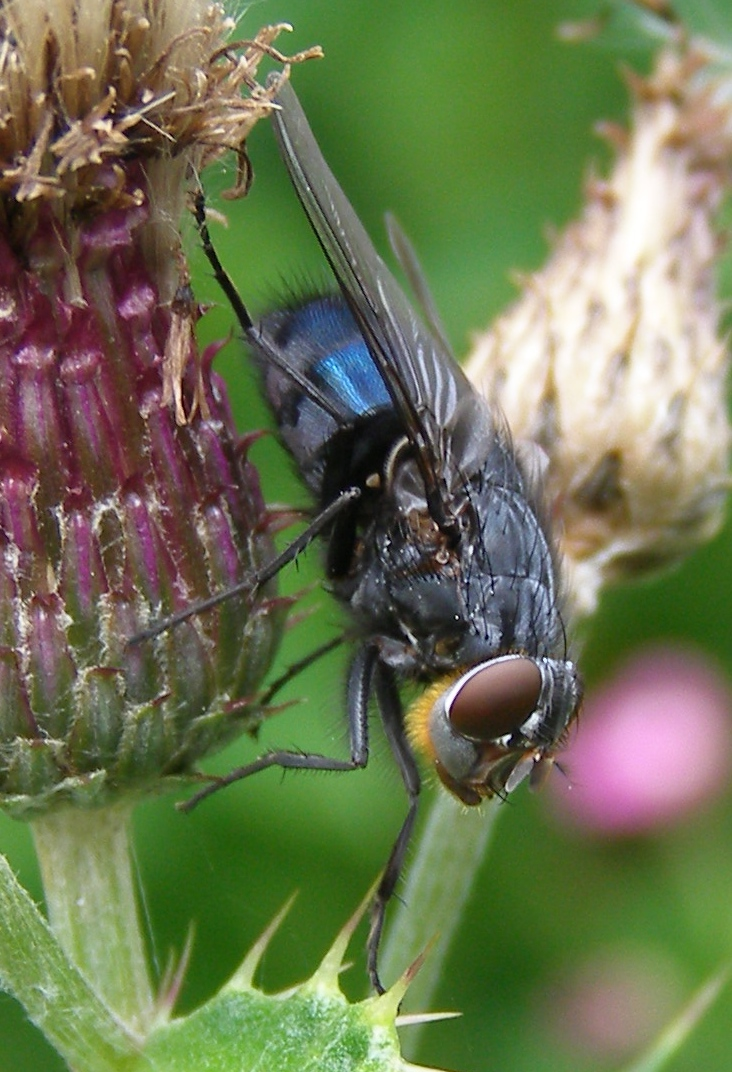
- Female
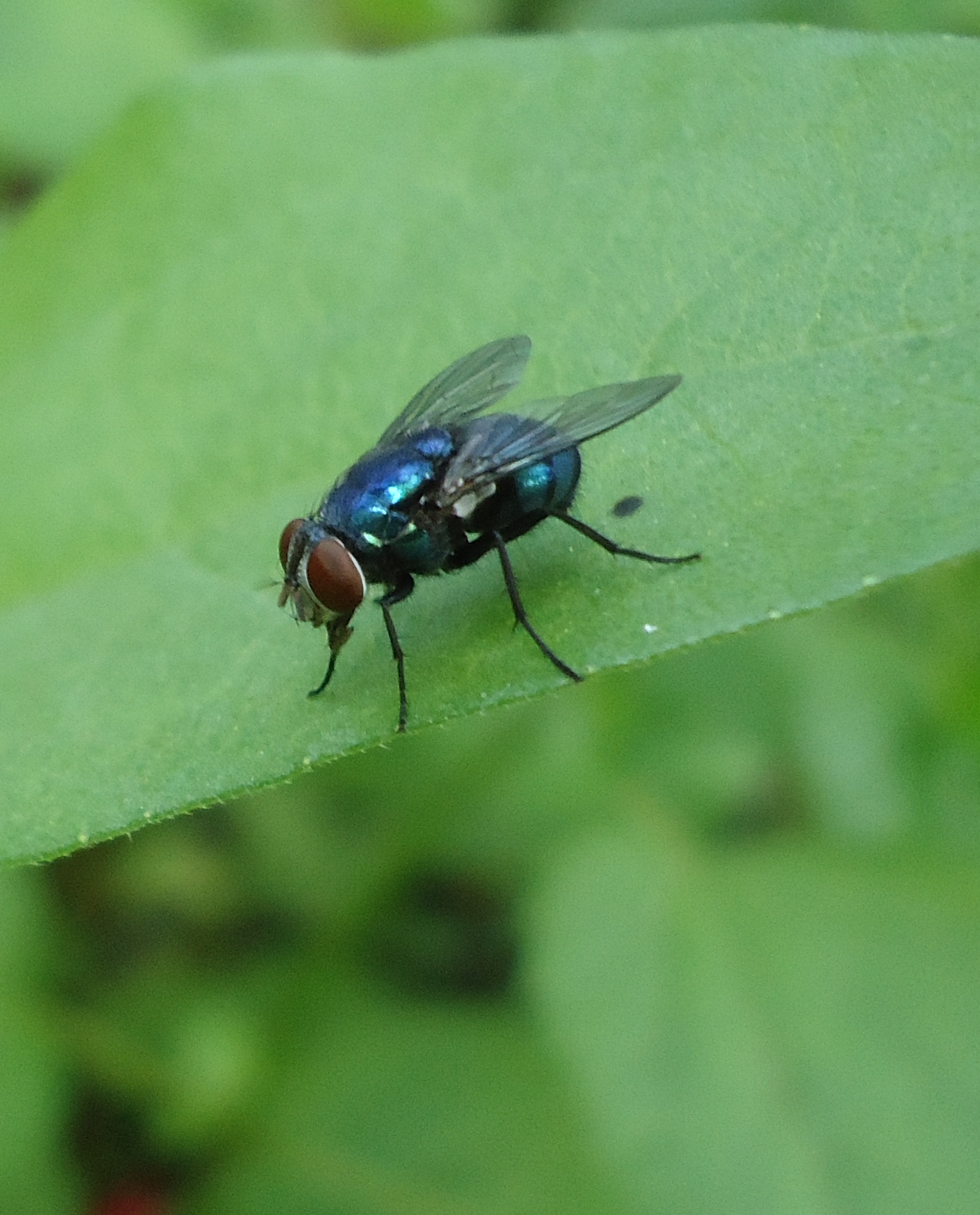
- Male

Scientific classification
- Kingdom: Animalia
- Phylum: Arthropoda
- Clade: Pancrustacea
- Class: Insecta
- Order: Diptera
- Family: Calliphoridae
- Genus: Calliphora
- Species: C. vomitoria

Binomial name
- Calliphora vomitoria (Linnaeus, 1758)

Synonyms
- Calliphora rubrifrons Townsend; Musca obscoena Eschscholz; Musca vomitoria Linnaeus

= Calliphora vomitoria =

Species of fly

Calliphora vomitoria, known as the bluebottle fly, orange-bearded bluebottle, or bottlebee, is a species of blowfly, a species in the family Calliphoridae. Calliphora vomitoria is the type species of the genus Calliphora. It is common throughout many continents including Europe, Americas, and Africa. They are fairly large flies, nearly twice the size of the housefly, with a metallic blue abdomen and long orange setae on the gena.

While adult flies feed on nectar, females deposit their eggs on rotting corpses, making them important forensic insects, as their eggs and timing of oviposition can be used to estimate time of death.

== Description ==
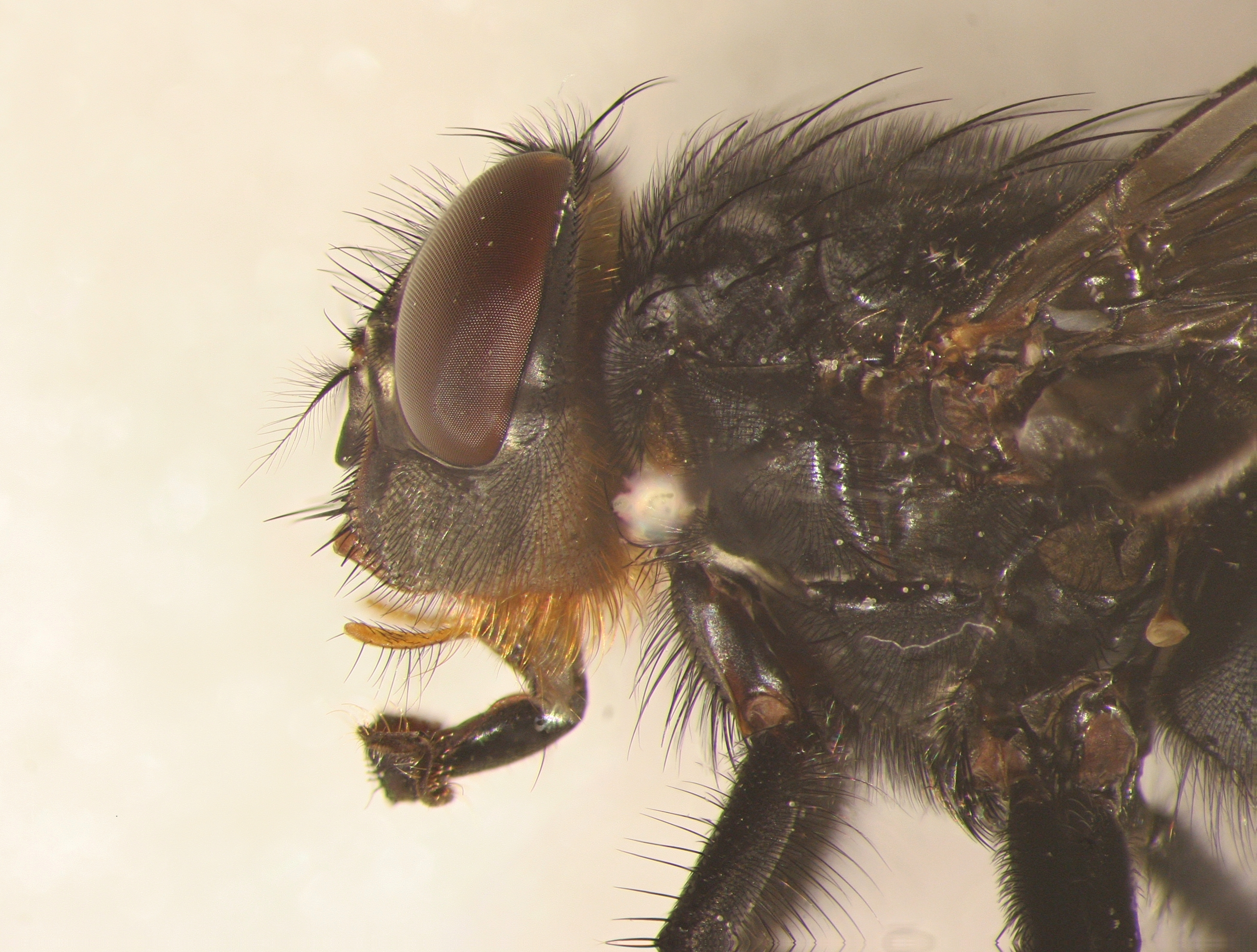
Lateral close-up of a male C. vomitoria

Bluebottle flies are typically 10–14 mm (3/8–9/16 in) long, almost twice the size of a housefly. The head and thorax are dull gray, and the back of the head has long yellow-orange setae. The abdomen is bright metallic blue with black markings. Its body and legs are covered with black bristly hairs. It has short, aristate antennae and four tarsi per leg. The eyes are red and the wings are transparent. The legs and antennae are black and pink. The chest is bright purple and has spikes for protection from other flies. To differentiate C. vomitoria from other closely related species such as Calliphora vicina, C. vomitoria can be identified by characteristic "orange cheeks", which are the orange hairs below the eyes. Additionally, C. vomitoria has a dark basicosta (base of the wing) while C. vicina has a yellow basicosta. All these characteristics can be identified through a simple photograph.

== Distribution and habitat ==
Calliphora vomitoria can be found throughout the world, including most of Europe, Alaska, Greenland, the south of Mexico, United States, and southern Africa. It prefers higher elevations relative to other Calliphoridae species, such as Lucilia sericata and Chrysomya albiceps. They are among the most abundant flies found in these regions.

Temperature has a significant effect on distribution. As is the case with most flies, C. vomitoria are found most abundantly during spring and summer, and least abundant during fall and winter. The preferred habitat of C. vomitoria varies depending on the season. During winter and summer, they can be found mostly in rural areas (and riparian areas to a lesser extent). During spring and fall, they are found in riparian areas.

== Life cycle ==
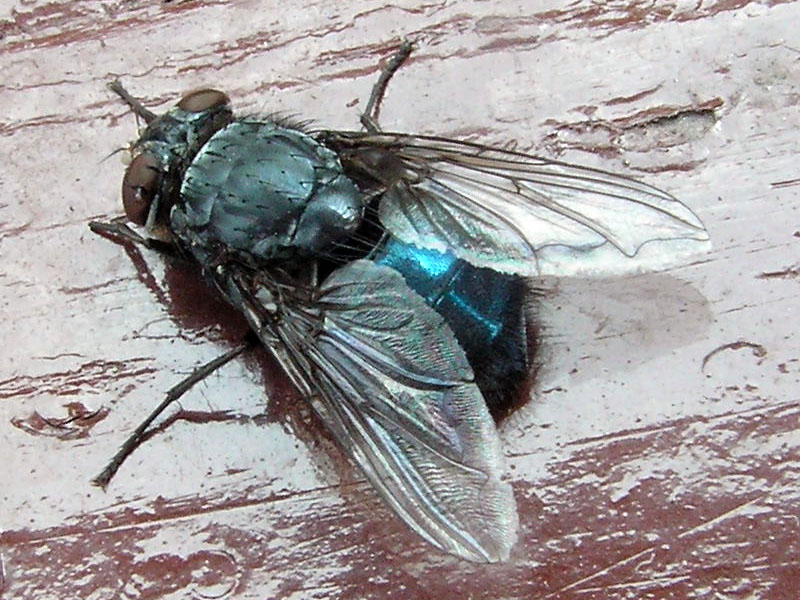
A dorsal closeup of the fly

Bluebottle flies have the complete cycle of egg, larva, pupa, and adult. Development usually takes around 2 weeks. Larvae are protein-rich and can theoretically be used as feed. A female bluebottle fly lays her eggs where she feeds, usually in decaying meat, garbage, or feces. Pale whitish larvae, commonly called maggots, soon hatch from the eggs and immediately begin feeding on carcasses of dead animals and on the decomposing matter where they were hatched. After a few days of feeding, they are fully grown. At that time they crawl away to a drier place where they burrow into soil or similar matter and pupate into tough brown cocoons. The pupal stage is the longest stage of the development cycle.

After two or three weeks, the adults emerge from the pupal stage to mate, beginning the cycle again. The normal duration spent in adult form averages 10–14 days, however, during cold weather, pupae and adults can hibernate until higher temperatures revive them.

=== Metamorphosis and cell death ===
Undergoing metamorphosis requires a tremendous amount of change for the fly, such as cell death. While it is commonly believed that programmed cell death and apoptosis are the same, they are not always so. At the beginning of metamorphosis during the larvae stage, salivary gland cells of Calliphora vomitoria larvae are programmed to self-destruct. After enough feeding, the larvae come to rest and an initial protein synthesis stage occurs, culminating in the production of high amounts of protein. This occurs from day 1 to about day 8. Then, on day 9, cell death of salivary gland cells occurs. This pattern of synthesis and destruction is not to be confused with apoptosis, as no DNA degeneration is seen and cells are shown to vacuolate and swell (instead of condensing and shrinking, as in the case of apoptosis). Instead, selective expression and DNA synthesis occur during programmed cell death of salivary gland cells.

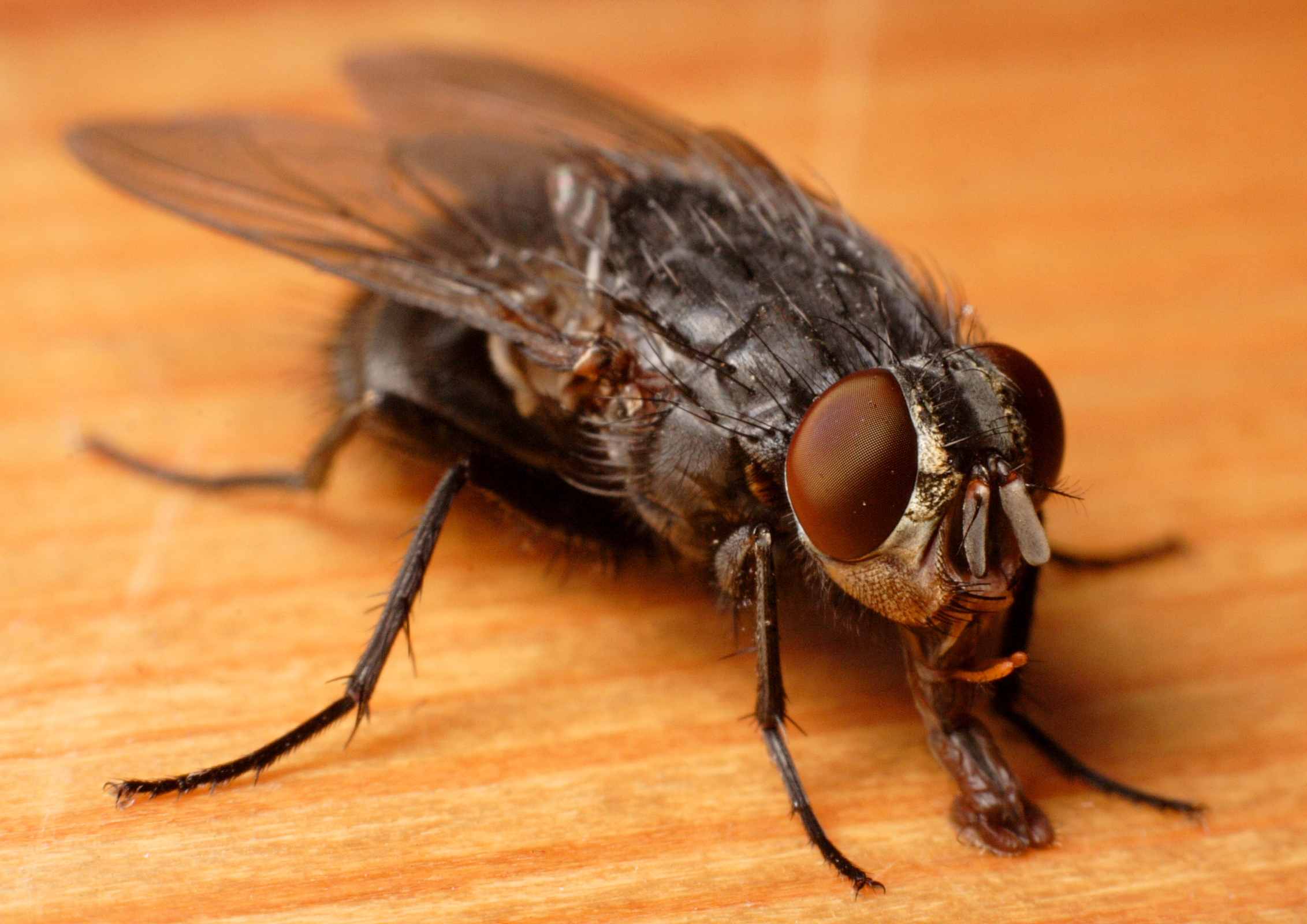
Calliphora vicina, close relative of C. vomitoria

== Diet ==
Like other blowflies, C. vomitoria colonize animal remains, including humans. While adult C. vomitoria feed on nectar, the larvae feed on corpses, the medium in which they grow. However, it has been shown that feeding on processed substrates (food that are modified for human consumption by increasing shelf life and taste through salting, curing, smoking, etc.) provided much better growth than unprocessed substrates such as raw unmodified liver. Because different substrates drastically affected growth, C. vomitoria is best characterized as a specialist that best utilizes processed substrates (minced meats, for example). Its close relative, Calliphora vicina, is a generalist, being able to utilize mixed substrates with equal growth rates. In the case of overcrowding, C. vomitoria competition results in compensation by increased speed of development, leading to smaller larvae and adults. This has complications in forensics because different parts of the body would grow at different rates. Additionally, it has been shown that the fly larvae are able to colonize even buried remains. Growth rates are similar between surface and buried larvae. Usually, these flies lay their eggs around wounds on fresh corpses shortly after death. Right before the pupal stage, the fly larvae that leaves the carrion can burrow into the soil in order to pupate. Then, adult flies emerge. In decaying carcasses, it was found that Calliphoridae flies dominate, especially C. vomitoria. In both spring and fall, C. vomitoria is the primary species found on carcasses. In some cases, C. vomitoria shares carcasses with other calliphorid species such as Lucilia caesar.

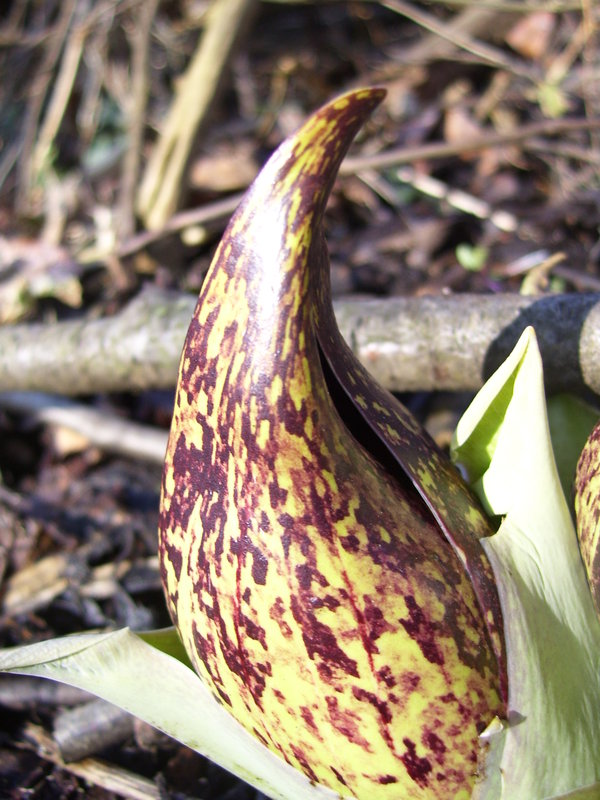
C. vomitoria is a known pollinator of the skunk cabbage

Bluebottle fly adults feed on nectar, and they are pollinators of flowers. They are especially attracted to flowers that have strong odors, such as those that have adapted to smell like rotting meat. Plants pollinated by the fly include the skunk cabbage (Symplocarpus foetidus), American pawpaw (Asimina triloba), dead horse arum (Helicodiceros muscivorus), goldenrod and some species of the carrot family. These insects tend to fly in packs in order to detect possible food sources more efficiently. If one fly detects food, it disperses a pheromone, which will alert the others to the meal.

== Parental care ==
Blow flies like C. vomitoria lay their eggs at carrion sites, which are scarce in most places so these corpses end up with many eggs of various species. As a result, high larval density arises. In fact, when there are many other individuals around the site, pregnant females increase oviposition rate (which increases number of offspring), likely triggered by contact and chemical stimulation. However, the large number of larvae ends up being beneficial for each individual. The larvae feed by secretion of enzymes that break down tissues of the corpse, so by aggregating in large numbers these secretions are more effective, leading to easier feeding. Additionally, the large aggregation helps generate heat and keep the larvae warm, as the flies generally prefer warmer temperature. One complication with the high number of individuals is that competition is still a factor, as larvae on the periphery may be left out of the feeding, and by the end of the developmental cycle they emerge undernourished and undersized.

== Physiology ==
=== Night flight ===
It has been suggested that C. vomitoria rarely fly at night, regardless of the presence of an existing corpse. They thus may not deposit eggs on corpses during the night. This is relevant for forensic science, as the approximate time of oviposition would be during the daytime.

Insulin chain A and B linked by disulfide bridges

=== Hormones ===
The median neuro-secretory cells (MNC) of the brain of Calliphora species contain peptide hormones that resemble insulin. This was proven when researchers were able to bind these insulin-like peptides with antibodies of bovine insulin. This shows that an insect hormone can be structurally analogous to a prominent mammalian hormone and it raises the possibility of these insulin-like or polypeptide-like materials serving as central nervous system regulatory hormones before they were metabolic regulatory hormones.

=== Adhesive organ ===
On the terminal region of the 5th tarsal segment, the C. vomitoria contain pulvilli, which are the cushion-like hairy feet on insects and many arthropods located at base of their two claws. The hair that project from the ventral surface is the key for the adhesion abilities of these flies. Additionally, they have large claws that help to hold on to irregular surfaces to prevent falling. Calliphora vomitoria, like other blowflies, also secrete non-volatile lipids through the hairs that are important for further adhesion. By a combination of the physical grip of the claws and hairs and the surface tension created by the lipid secretions, they are able to adhere to smooth surfaces with ease.

== Interaction with humans ==
=== Forensics ===
These flies are among the most important insect evidence in forensic science, specifically for obtaining time of colonization (TOC) and post mortem interval (PMI). Calliphora species are the most important in temperate regions because of their growth rate in accordance to temperature. By knowing the temperature, the amount of time since the eggs were laid can be estimated. In addition, C. vomitoria has higher threshold temperature for growth than many species; likewise, it is present in many regions. There is a limit to their usage, though, as few species can survive in cold temperatures; most cannot continue development unless it is warmer than roughly 2 °C (36 °F).

Degradation of carcasses can be divided into six separate stages: stage of decomposition, fresh stage, bloated stage, active decay stage, advanced decay stage, and remains stage. Adult C. vomitoria first starts to appear at carcasses during the bloated stage, followed by larvae 1 to 3 days after. During the active decay stage, the blowfly larvae population reaches its peak.

In buried corpses, information of time since burial and how the body was kept (above/below ground before burial) can also be collected through the identification of C. vomitoria. The study of these flies, however, is limited to areas where entomologists are readily available, as life histories can differ in separate regions. These life histories differ in subtle ways due to differences in climate such as temperature and elevation. These restrictions should be thus considered so the proper time of colonization (TOC) and post mortem interval (PMI) can be established.

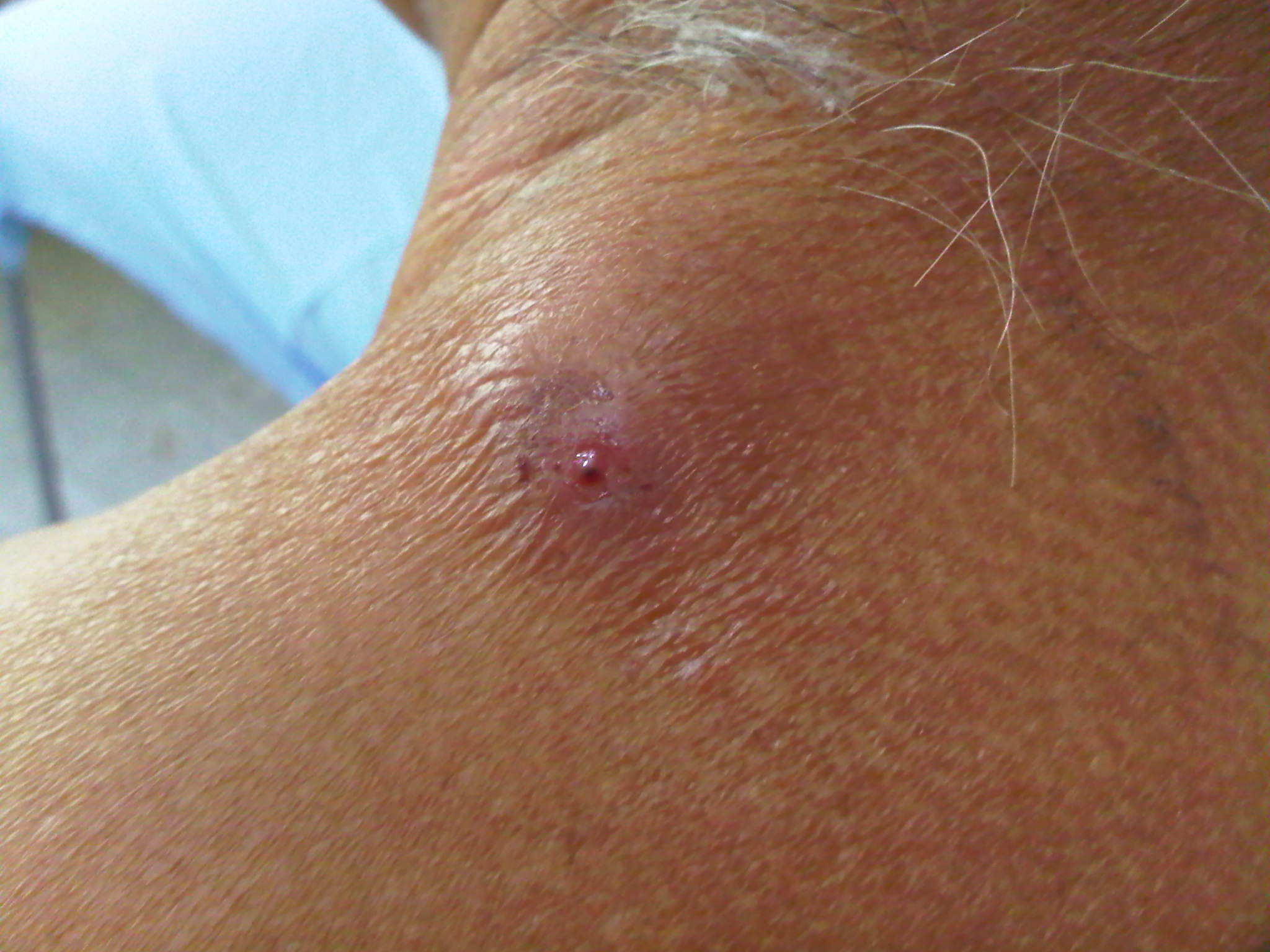
Myiasis in a human neck

This bluebottle fly can also cause human or animal myiasis (parasitization in a living individual). Forensic scientists sometimes identify it in the course of their work, such as in one case of an autopsy of a neglected child.

==== Identification ====
Calliphora vomitoria is often not the only species present at carrion, so some process of identification of the correct species is needed in order to avoid false estimates of the time of death due to their having different developmental cycles. In the past, simple morphological differences are used to differentiate between species. However, it is very difficult in crime scenes because more often than not these sites are not ideal, with preservation of insect species far from good. Methods that can best differentiate between the species are DNA, mitochondrial DNA, and the COI gene. The COI gene used in conjunction with restriction enzymes has been shown to be a relatively fast and simple method of distinguishing between blowfly species with good accuracy.

==== Post mortem interval ====
Post mortem interval (PMI) is the time between death and discovery of a corpse. Calliphora vomitoria is important for PMI estimations because it is among the first species to lay eggs on the corpse. There are two ways of estimating PMI. One is killing the larvae, and then comparing the larvae's length and temperature to those in the standardized data. Another way to calculate PMI is to calculate the accumulated degree hours/days (ADH/D) that a larva needs to reach a certain developmental stage. The later method is the more widely accepted way to estimate PMI.

==== Legal importance ====
As one of the most abundant flies and their tendency to be first on the case (carrion), they are very useful in legal investigations. Other Calliphora species, while important as parasites of humans, are not as important simply because they are less often found. However, there is not a clear consensus on fly distribution, as different areas attract different species of flies, and so field research should be conducted in local areas to confirm the presence or absence of these important forensic resources.

=== Pollination of crops ===
Calliphora vomitoria can sometimes pollinate crops, working especially well with strongly scented crops. However, it can also transmit pathogenic bacteria such as Xanthomonas campestris pv. campestris to flowers, resulting in infected seeds.

== Gallery ==
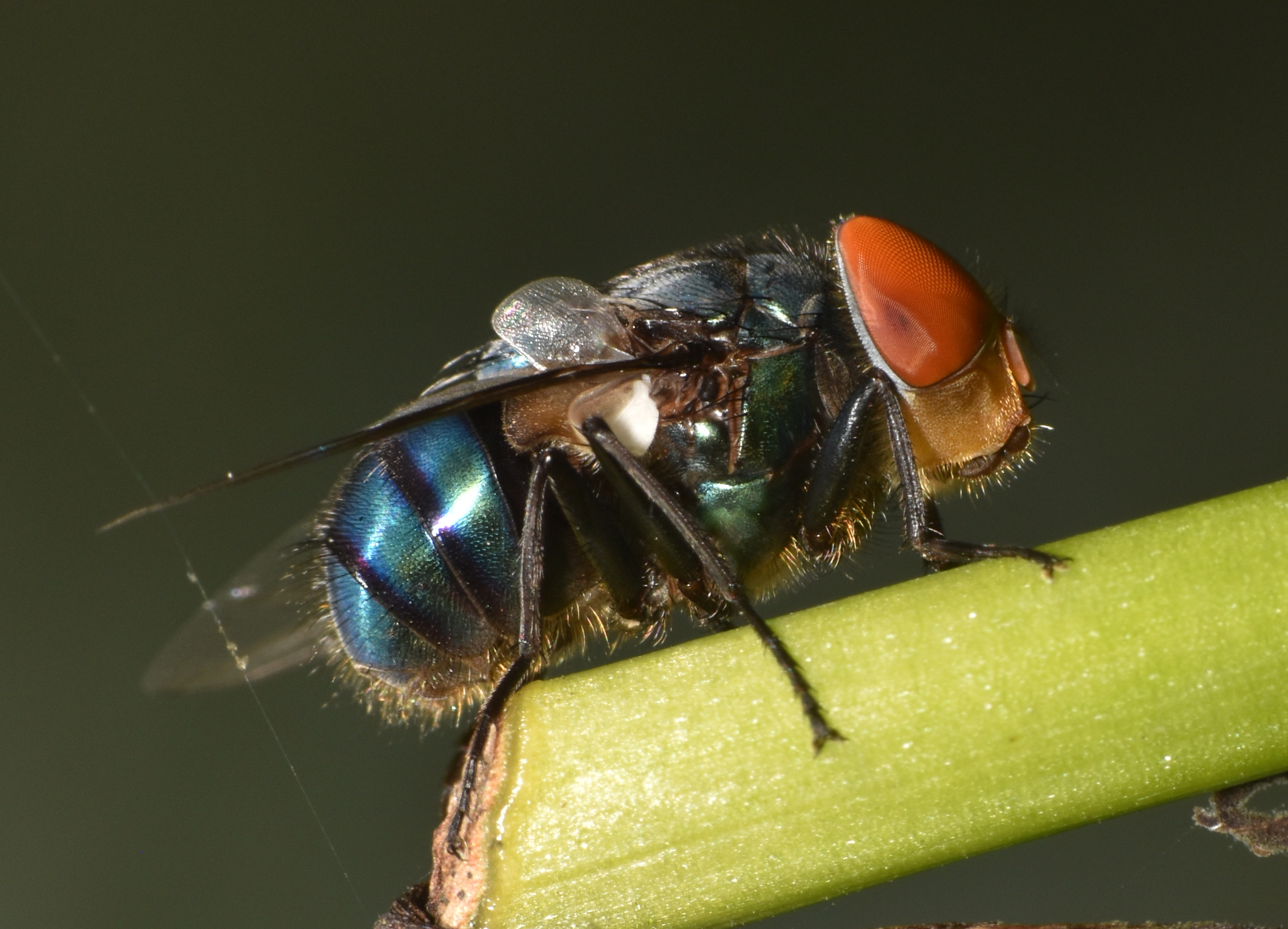
Lateral view

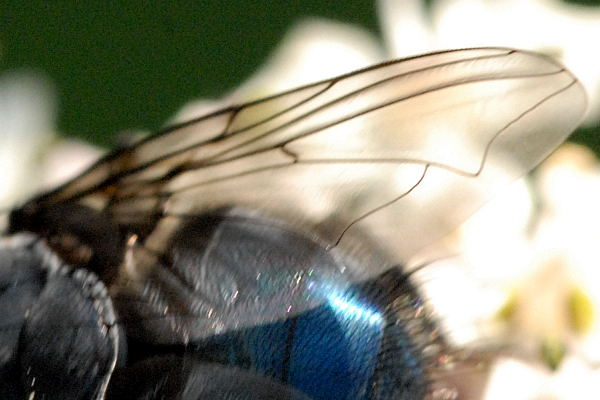
Wing

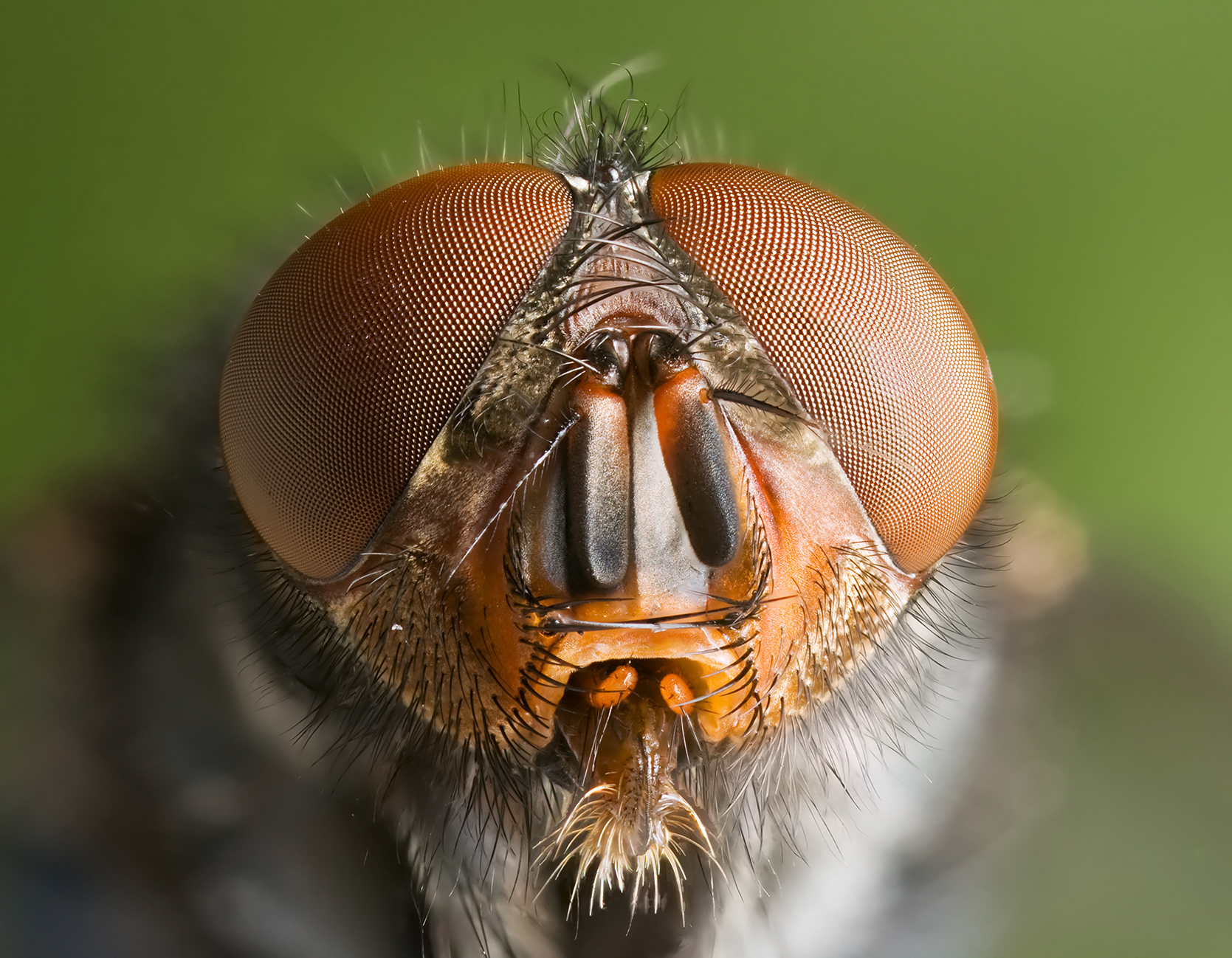
Closeup of eye structure

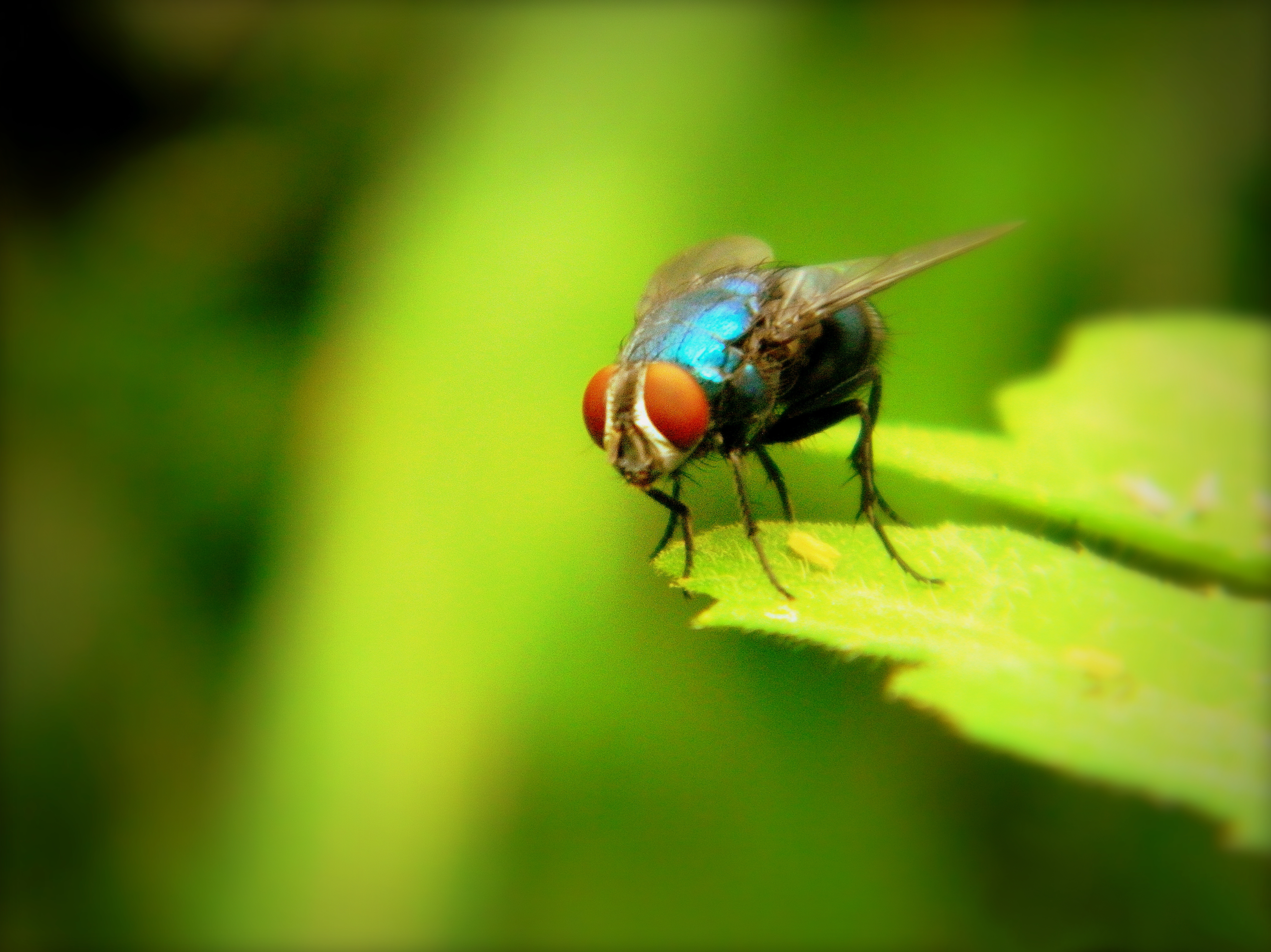
Ready to take off

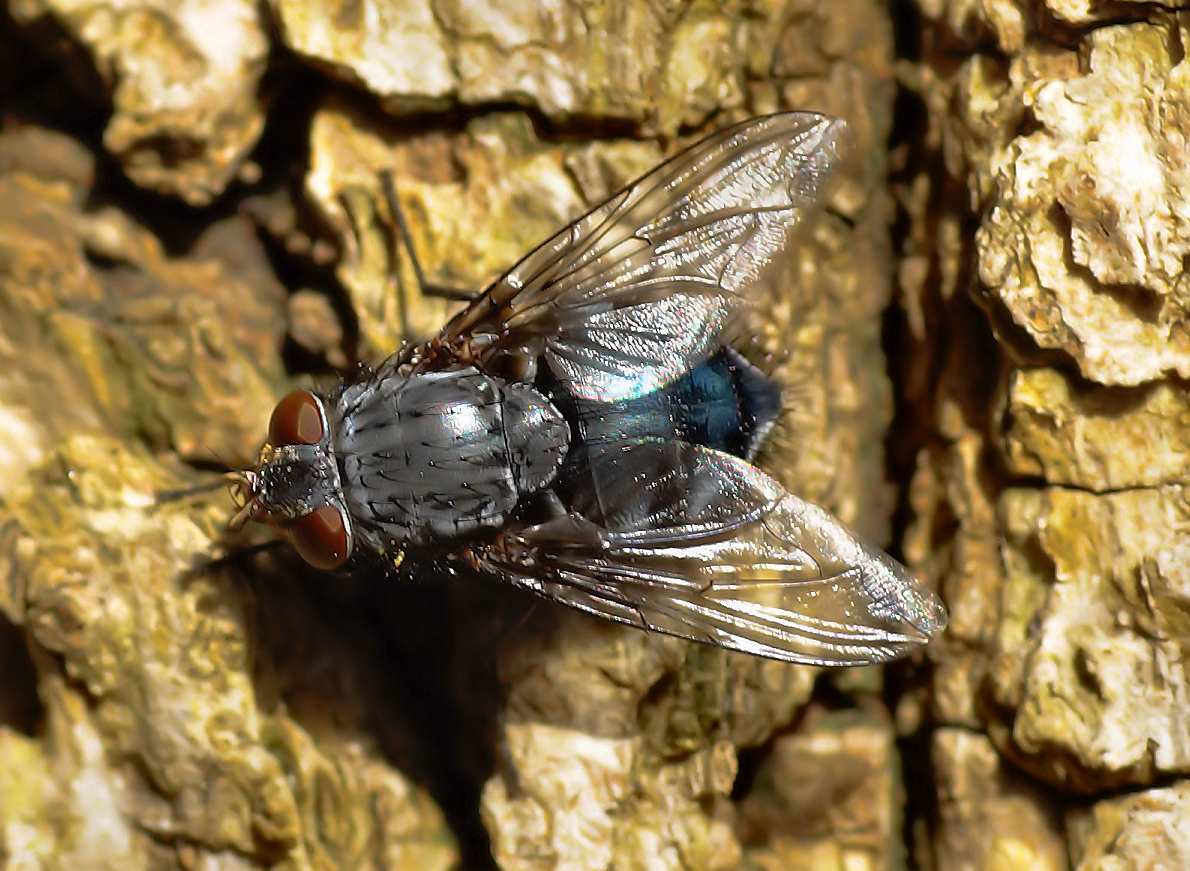
View from the top
