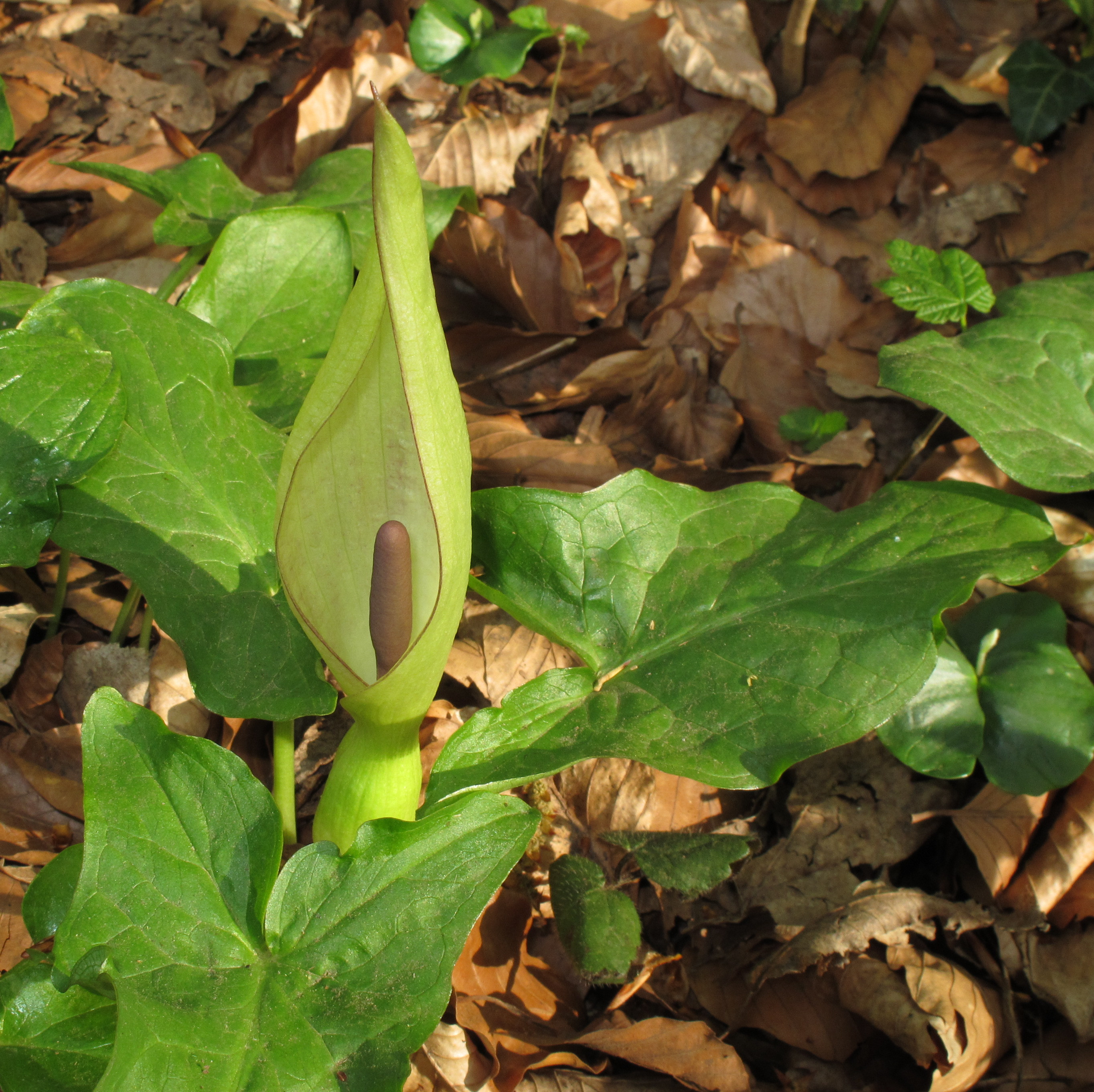
- Arum maculatum, a member of the tribe Areae

Scientific classification
- Kingdom: Plantae
- Clade: Embryophytes
- Clade: Tracheophytes
- Clade: Angiosperms
- Clade: Monocots
- Order: Alismatales
- Family: Araceae
- Subfamily: Aroideae
- Tribe: Areae; R.Br. ex Duby

Genera
- See text

= Areae (plant) =

Tribe of plants

Areae is a tribe of plants in the arum family. The genera are related by genetics, but - apart from Sauromatum - also have a very similar growth habit.

== Taxonomy ==
Areae contains the following eight genera:

- Arum L.
- Biarum Schott
- Dracunculus Mill.
- Eminium Schott
- Sauromatum Schott
- Helicodiceros Schott
- Theriophonum Blume
- Typhonium Schott
