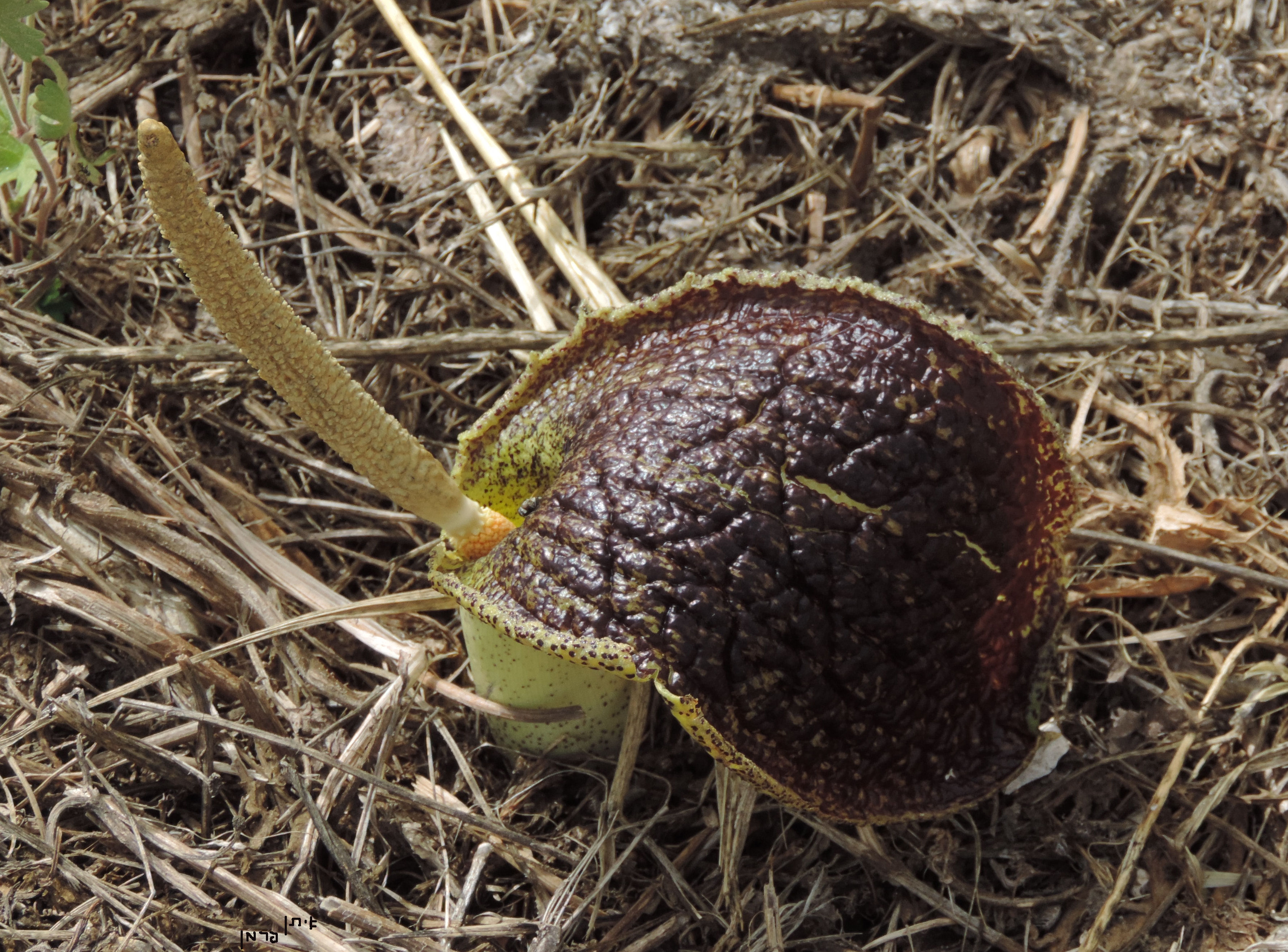

Scientific classification
- Kingdom: Plantae
- Clade: Tracheophytes
- Clade: Angiosperms
- Clade: Monocots
- Order: Alismatales
- Family: Araceae
- Genus: Eminium
- Species: E. spiculatum

Binomial name
- Eminium spiculatum (Blume) Schott

= Eminium spiculatum =

Species of flowering plant

Eminium spiculatum is a species of plant in the family Araceae.

== Description ==
Perennial. Corm thick, globular. Leaves petiolate; petiole sheathing, often purplish. Limbs shorter than petioles, those of the first shoots regular, the others decomposed into secondary limbs issued at the base with one fitting into the other. Spathe with a tube equal to the lamina. The outer part of both has light background with numerous brown veins; the inner part of the lamina blackish brown or purplish, granulated. Appendix black, short.

== Flowering ==
March–May.

== Habitat ==
Fields, waste ground, rocks.

== Distribution ==
Coast, middle mountain, Beqaa Valley of Lebanon.

== Geographic area ==
Syria, Lebanon, Israel, Jordan, Egypt.

The corms of this plant are appreciated by Egyptian Bedouins, who eat them like potatoes after boiling. Some eat the seeds in times of scarcity.
