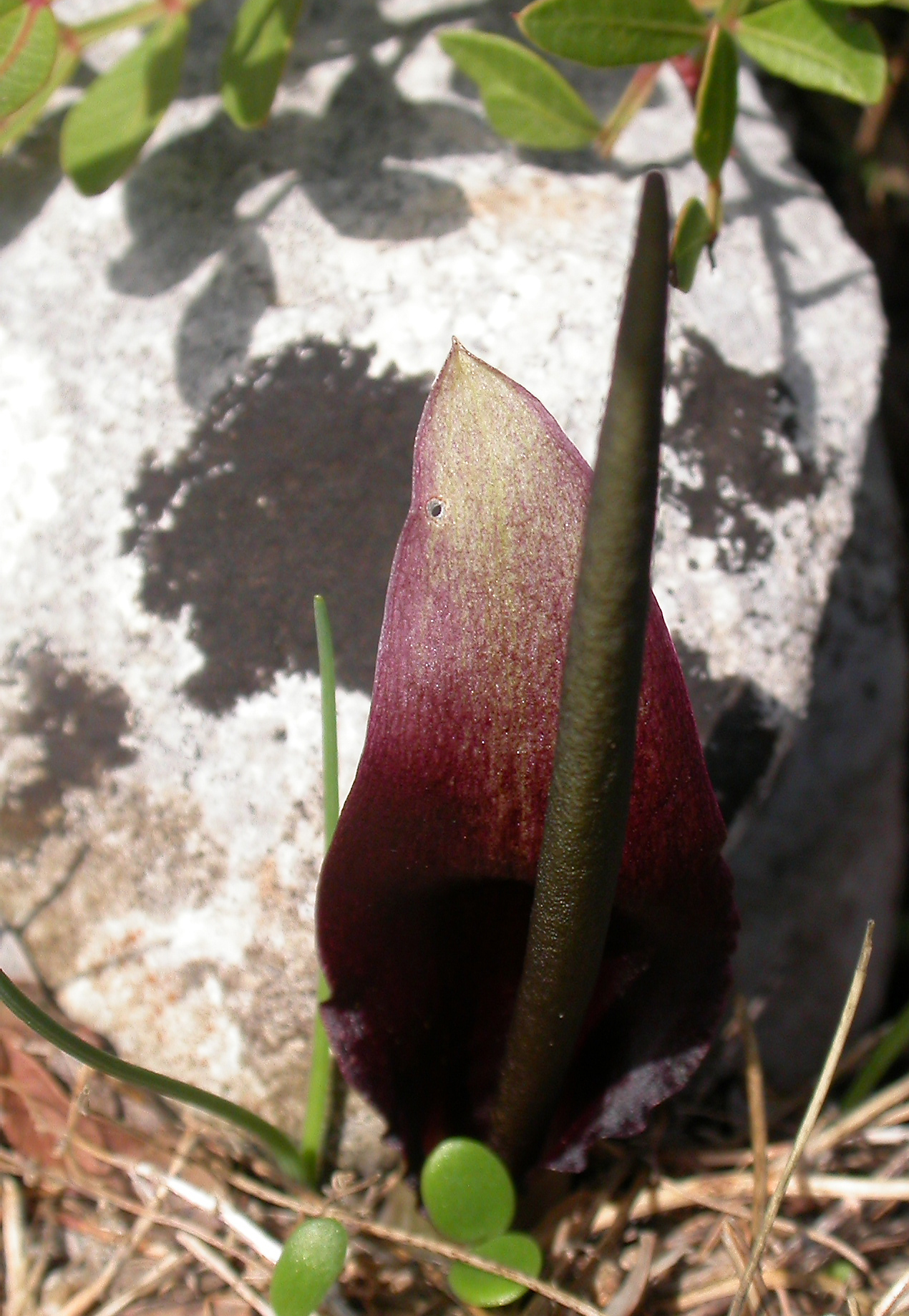
- Biarum tenuifolium

Scientific classification
- Kingdom: Plantae
- Clade: Tracheophytes
- Clade: Angiosperms
- Clade: Monocots
- Order: Alismatales
- Family: Araceae
- Subfamily: Aroideae
- Tribe: Areae
- Genus: Biarum; Schott 1832
- Range of the genus Biarum.

Synonyms
- Homaid Adans.; Homaida Raf.; Ischarum Blume; Cyllenium Schott; Leptopetion Schott; Stenurus Salisb.

= Biarum =

Genus of flowering plants

Biarum is a genus of flowering plants in the family Araceae. It is composed of plants that are native to the Middle East, southern Europe (Spain, Portugal, Italy, Balkans), and North Africa. Biarum are often found growing in rock crevices and graveled soil composed largely of limestone.

The leaves of Biarum can be similar to grass or even oval. Their corms are spherical and the plants as a whole tend to be small. Many Biarum are quite similar in appearance to Arums. To flower Biarum required a dry rest period during summer. Their inflorescence tend to grow close to the ground and produce an extremely intense and unpleasant odor. The fruits produced tend to be camouflaged so as to resemble stones. It's not entirely known how they are dispersed, but one idea is that they have evolved to avoid seed dispersal since doing so in such inhospitable environments might not be conducive to its reproduction.

Species

- Biarum aleppicum J.Thiébaut - Syria
- Biarum angustatum (Hook.f.) N.E.Br. - Syria, Israel
- Biarum auraniticum Mouterde - Syria
- Biarum bovei Blume - Turkey, Syria, Lebanon, Israel, Jordan, Iraq, Iran
- Biarum carduchorum (Schott) Engl. - Turkey, Syria, Lebanon, Israel, Jordan, Iraq, Iran
- Biarum carratracense (Willk.) Font Quer - southern Spain
- Biarum crispulum (Schott) Engl. - Turkey, Syria
- Biarum davisii Turrill - Crete
- Biarum dispar (Schott) Talavera - southern Spain, Sardinia, Algeria, Libya, Tunisia, Morocco
- Biarum ditschianum Bogner & P.C.Boyce - Turkey, Kastellorizo Island in Greece
- Biarum eximium (Schott & Kotschy) Engl. - Turkey, Jordan
- Biarum fraasianum (Schott) Nyman - Greece
- Biarum kotschyi (Schott) B.Mathew ex Riedl - Turkey
- Biarum marmarisense (P.C.Boyce) P.C.Boyce - Turkey, Symi Island in Greece
- Biarum mendax P.C.Boyce - southern Spain, Alto Alentejo Province in Portugal
- Biarum olivieri Blume - Egypt, Israel
- Biarum pyrami (Schott) Engl. - Turkey, Syria, Lebanon, Israel, Jordan
- Biarum rhopalospadix K.Koch - Greece
- Biarum straussii Engl. - Iran, Iraq
- Biarum syriacum (Spreng.) Riedl - Turkey, Syria
- Biarum tenuifolium (L.) Schott - Morocco, Portugal, Spain, Italy, Greece, Albania, Yugoslavia, Turkey

== Gallery ==
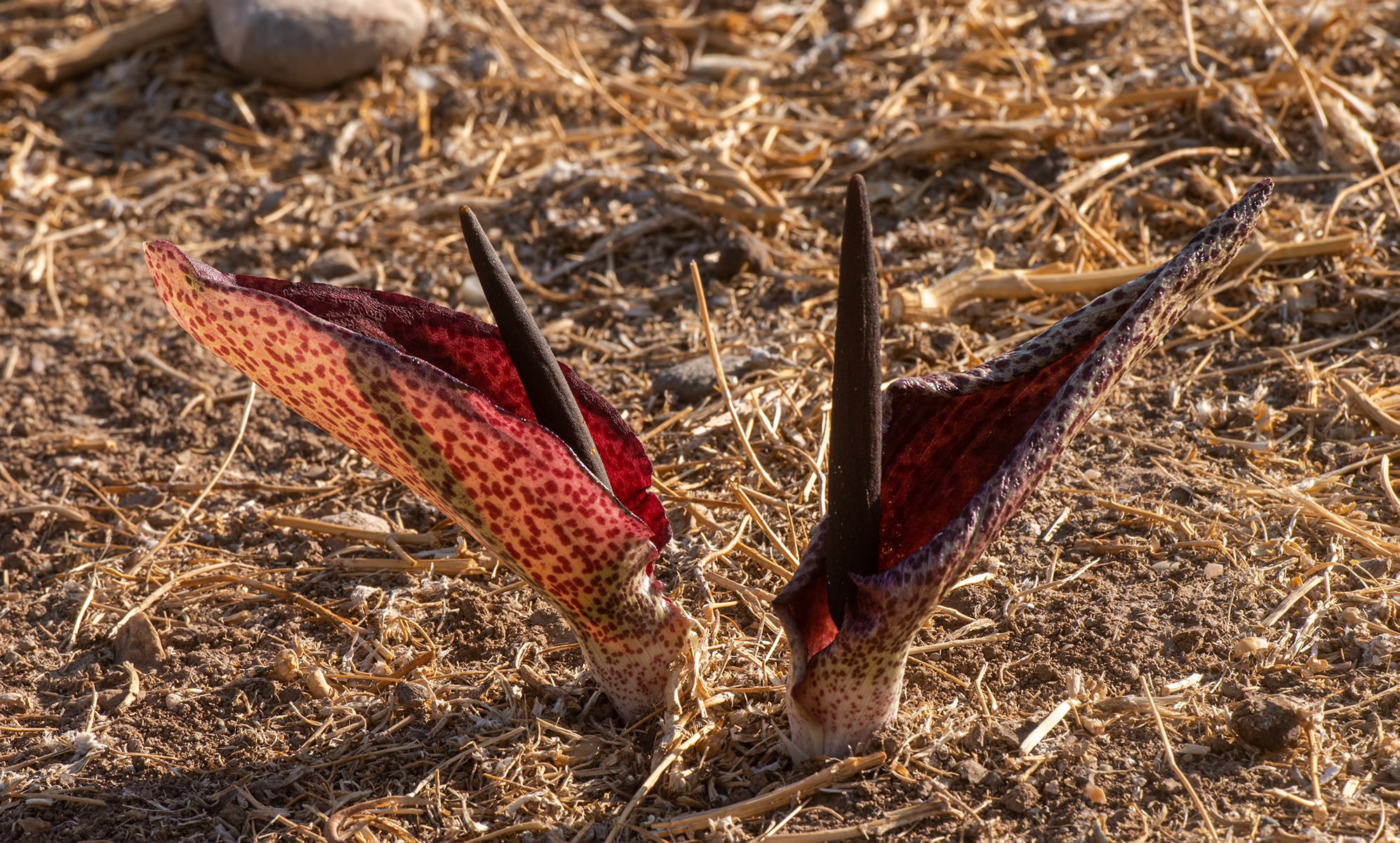
B. aleppicum

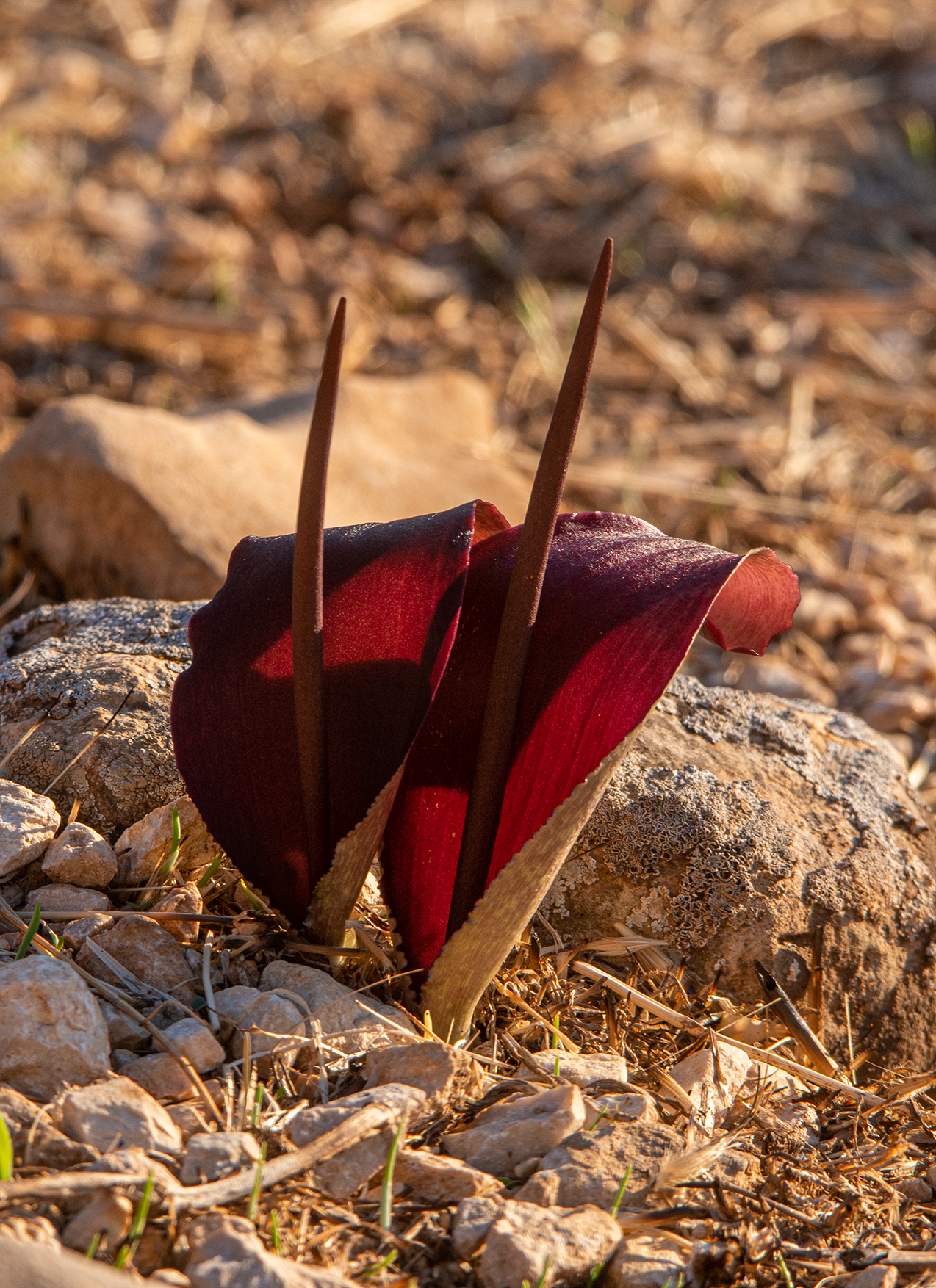
B. carduchorum

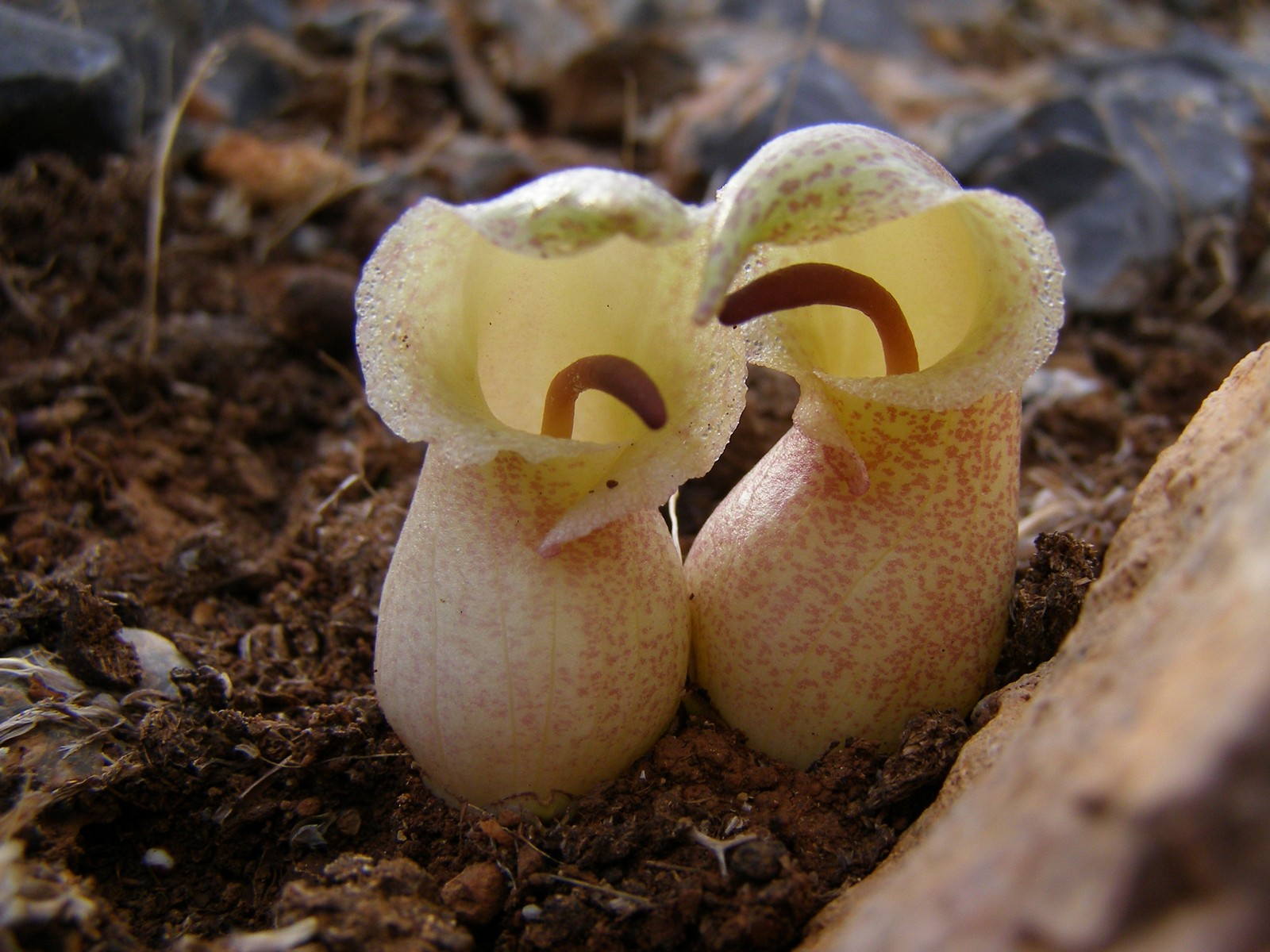
B. davisii

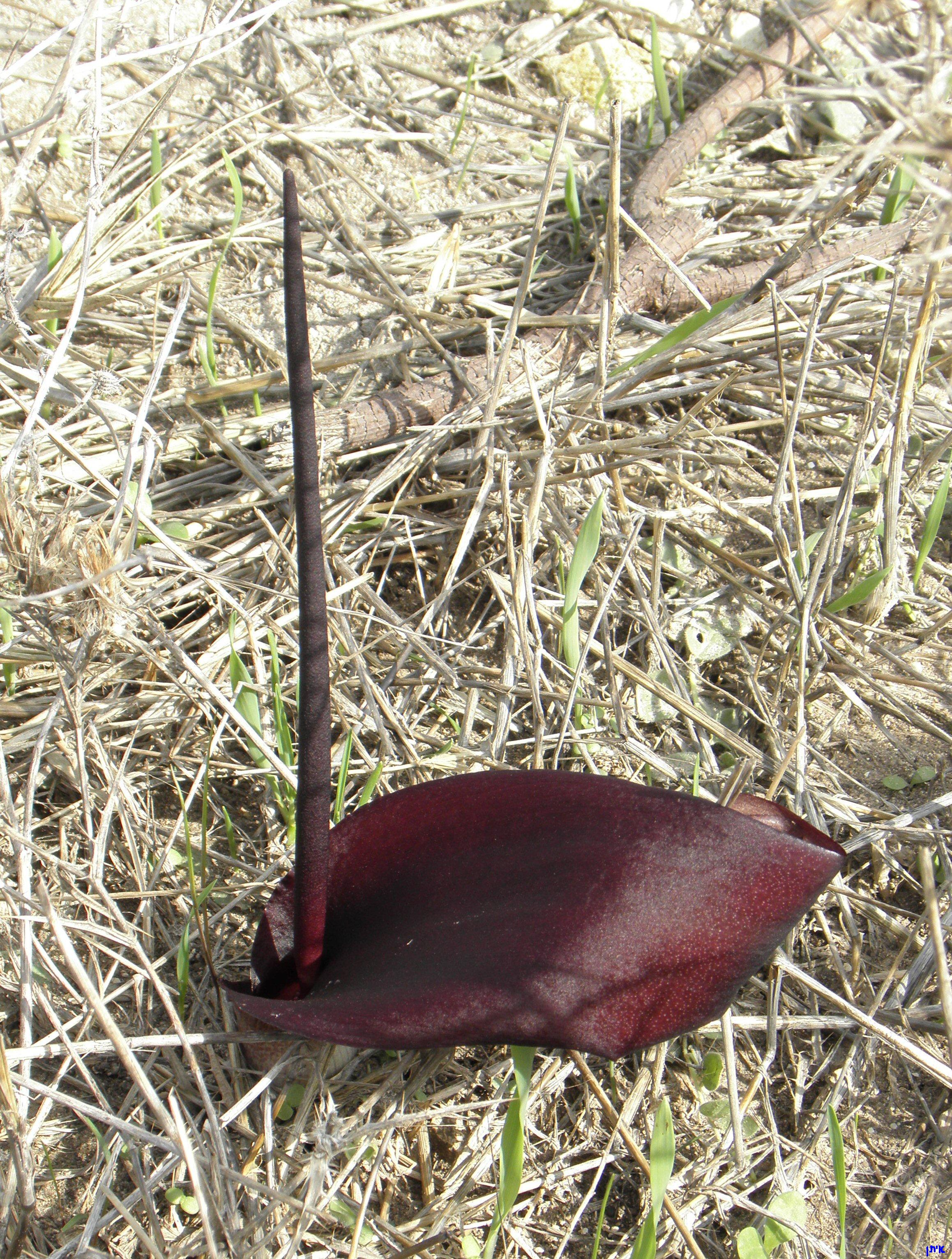
B. pyrami

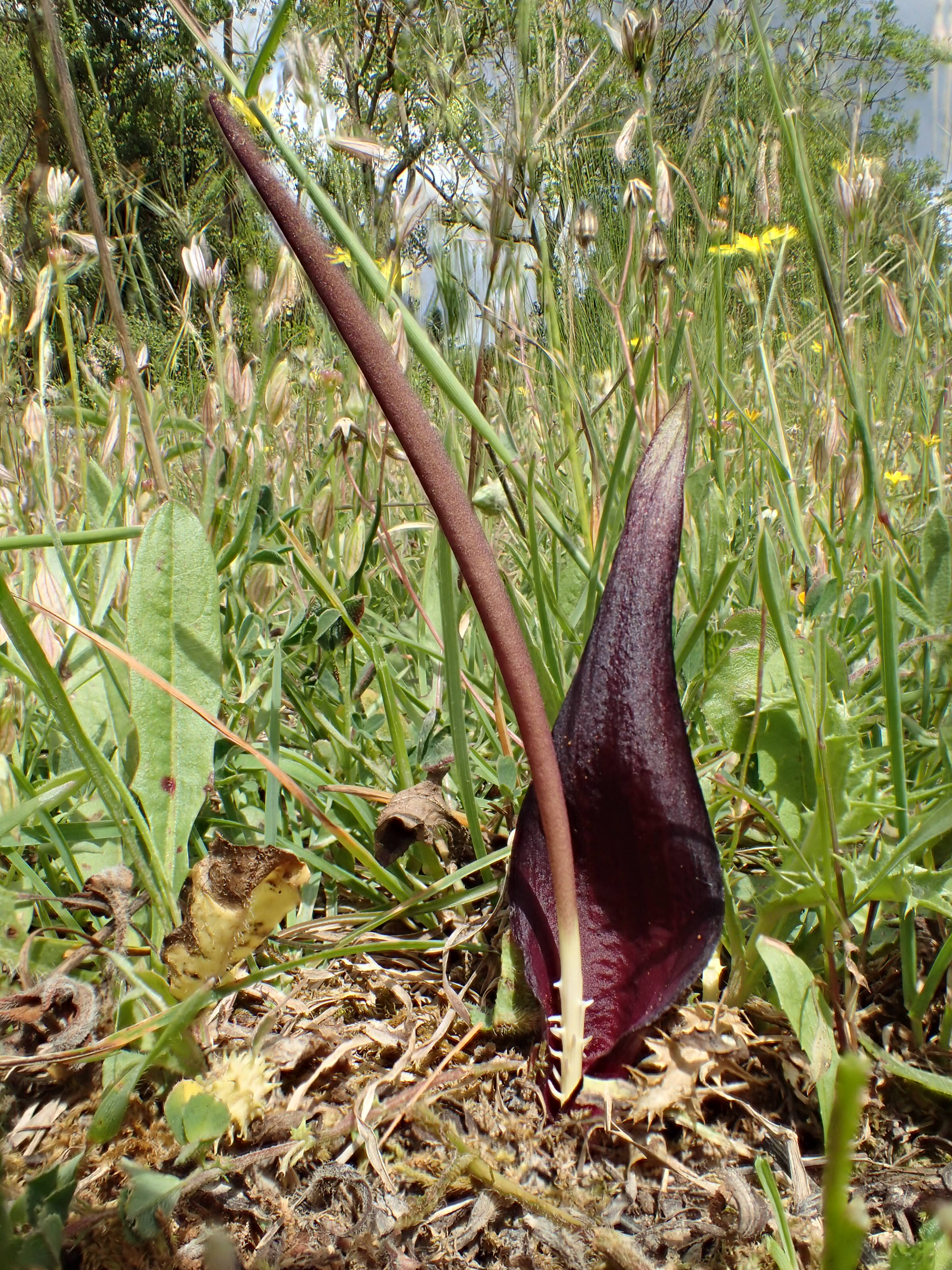
B. tenuifolium
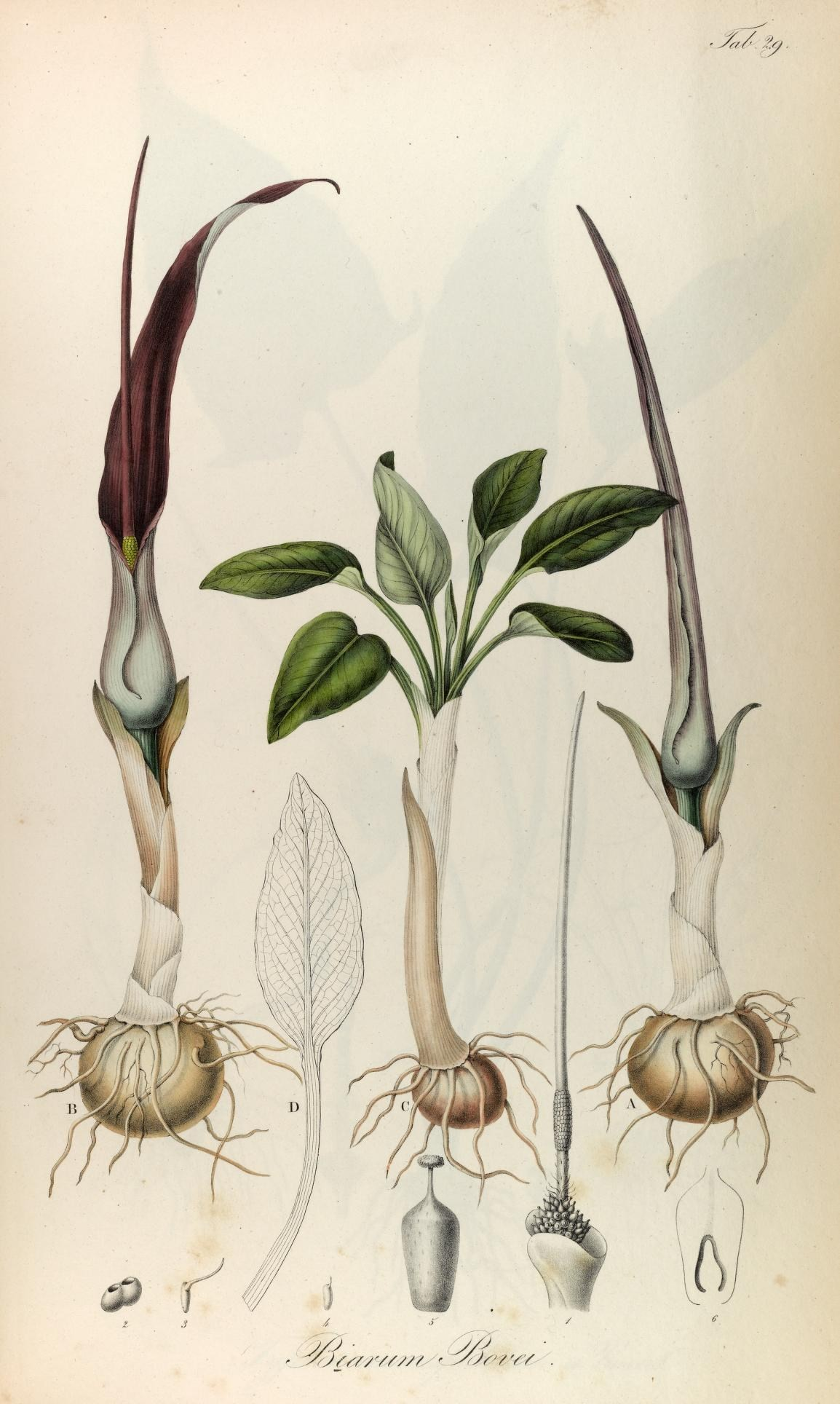
B. bovei

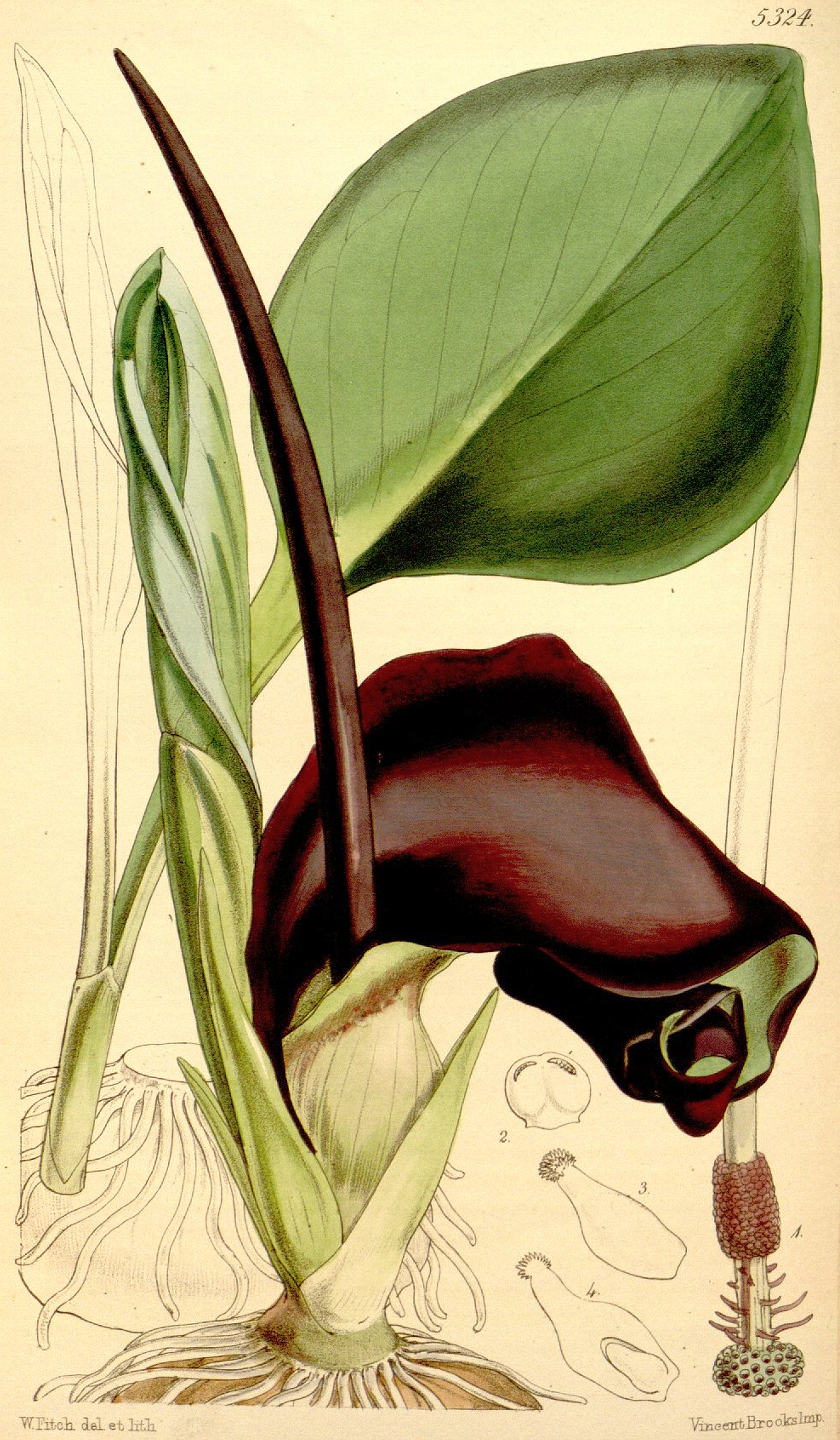
B. pyrami
