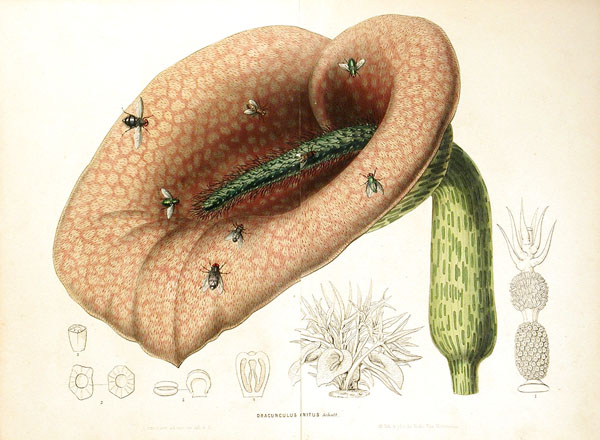
- Illustration from Louis van Houtte's Flore des serres et des jardins de l'Europe (1849)

Conservation status
- Least Concern (IUCN 3.1)

Scientific classification
- Kingdom: Plantae
- Clade: Tracheophytes
- Clade: Angiosperms
- Clade: Monocots
- Order: Alismatales
- Family: Araceae
- Subfamily: Aroideae
- Tribe: Areae
- Genus: Helicodiceros; Schott ex K.Koch
- Species: H. muscivorus

Binomial name
- Helicodiceros muscivorus (L.f.) Engl.
- Range of Helicodiceros muscivorus in Europe

Synonyms
- List: Megotigea Raf.; Arum muscivorum L.f.; Dracunculus muscivorus (L.f.) Parl.; Arum crinitum Aiton; Arum spirale Salisb.; Dracunculus crinitus Schott; Megotigea crinita Raf.; Helicodiceros crinitus (Raf.) Schott; Dracunculus muscivorus var. caprariensis Romo

= Helicodiceros =

Dead horse arum lily

Genus of flowering plants

Helicodiceros muscivorus, the dead horse arum lily, is an ornamental plant native to Corsica, Sardinia and the Balearic Islands. It is the only species in the genus Helicodiceros. Within the family Araceae the plant is part of the subfamily Aroideae.

The flowers of H. muscivorus smell like rotting meat, attracting carrion-seeking blow flies which act as pollinators. The composition of the volatiles is similar to that of carrion. The main compounds are dimethyl disulfide and dimethyl trisulfide. One of a rare group of thermogenic plants, the dead horse arum can raise its temperature by thermogenesis. This helps to lure flies into the plant to contact its pollen. The plant still is being studied for the way it is able to produce its own heat without being necessarily dependent of ambient temperature.

== Description ==
The inflorescence of the arum lilies is a three-part spadix which resembles the anal area of a dead mammal. In between is a hairy spathe such as a 'tail' running down into the chamber of the flower which bonds with the fertile male and female florets. The appendix and the male florets are thermogenic, but have different temporal patterns. The exits of the female florets are hindered by spines and filaments which serve to trap the blow flies once inside. The male florets exhibit independence from the ambient temperatures as heat production depends on the time of the day rather than ambient temperatures. Also, uncoupling protein was found in both the thermionic male florets and the appendix. The protein is 1178 nucleotides in length in the dead horse arum mRNA excluding the poly-A tail and it is believed to have a protein of 304 amino acids. It also possesses three mitochondrial carrier signature domains, six membrane-spanning domains, and one nucleotide-binding domain. Potato and rice have been compared to the plant at times due to its typical features of the uncoupling protein. Uncoupling protein plays a role in the production of energy to become heat.

== Thermogeny ==
Flies emerging from floral chamber

The dead horse arum manipulates the heat to release an odor that lures the flies to the structure of the appendix of the flower to begin pollination. This odor is a strong, putrid smell, its composition bearing similarity to a real carcass, and which flies are unable to distinguish from a real carcass. Blow flies, such as the common green bottle fly (Lucilia sericata), find the smell and the flesh-colored hairy inflorescence of the plant irresistible, such that large numbers of flies are attracted into the plant.^{(This source should not be cited to describe the specific interaction between these two species)} The thermogeny has a direct effect on the pollinators, by altering their behavior. Although male florets of the dead horse arum exhibit some independence from ambient temperature the pattern has shown that heat production depends on time of the day. Pollination occurs in one to two days. The highest temperature of the plant was found to peak at noon on day 1. The appendix temperature was 12.4 °C higher than ambient temperature. During day 1, eight flowering plants received a total of 881 fly visits. Thermogeny has been linked to be produced by the uncoupling protein; it does not complete the process to ATP synthesis, instead it allows electrons to flow into the mitochondria without creating ATP. The result is the creation of more energy which then dissipates into heat.

== Pollination ==
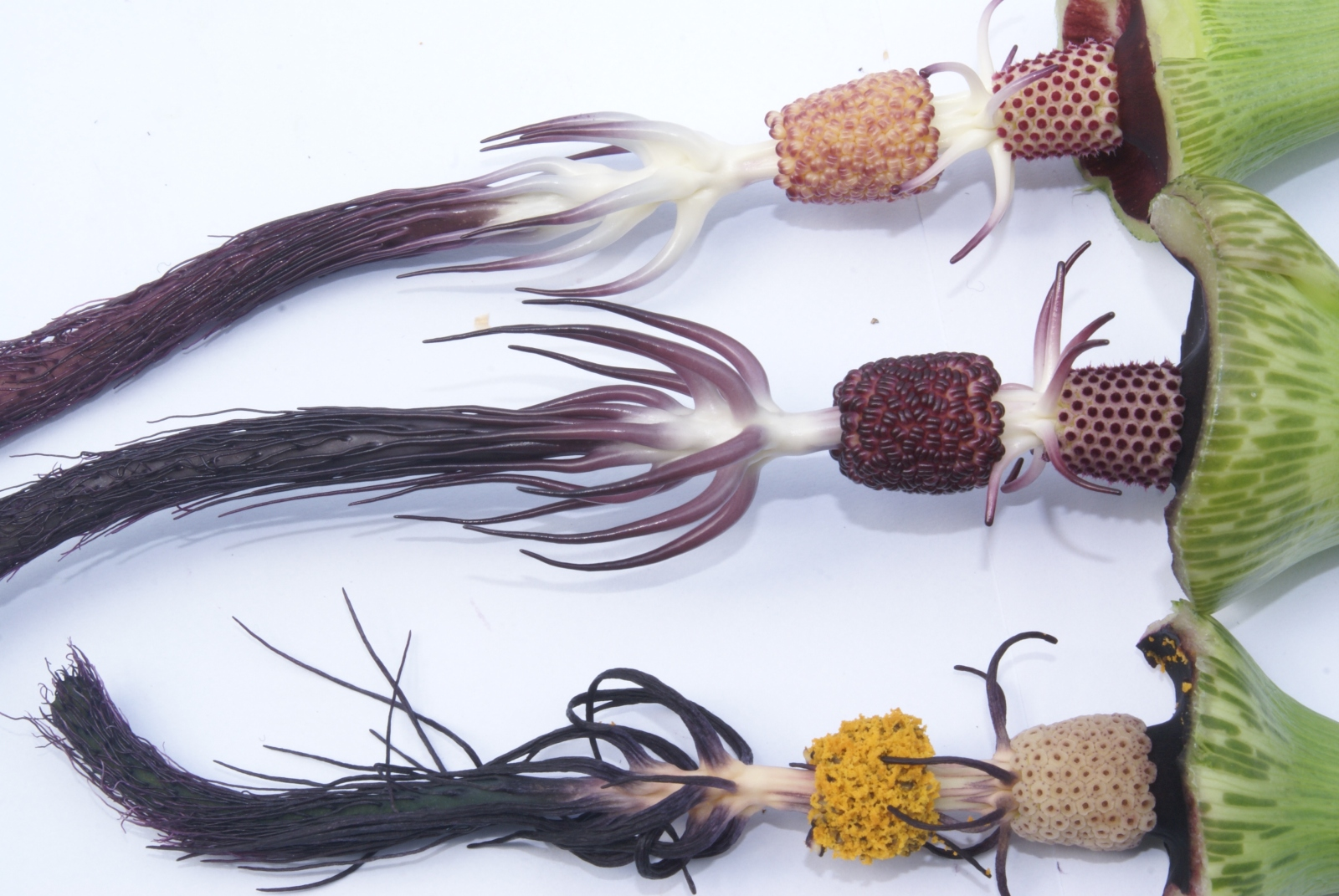
The different stages of flowering

The dead horse arum has a two-day process for pollination. The individual flower is able to receive pollen for one day only, and usually that day its male parts are not mature. Although the male part is able to produce pollen the next day, the female part shrivels up and cannot receive it. Both these mechanisms favor pollination from another plant and discourage self-pollination. When ready to pollinate, the plant produces its own heat and generates a smell like rotting flesh. This smell attracts the blow flies into the chamber of the plant for pollination. Once the flies are inside, they are trapped in the chamber by spines that block the exit path. The flies, which are carrying pollen from previous visits to other flowers, cover the female floret with that pollen, as they try to find a place to lay their eggs. The flies remain trapped overnight, and the spines remain erect until the male florets at the entrance of the chamber start producing pollen, by which time the female florets are no longer receptive. At this point, the spines wilt and the flies are able to leave. Just as the flies leave, they have to pass through the male florets and are coated with pollen that they will transport to another plant. Some blowflies, such as Calliphora vomitoria, are known pollinators.

== Gallery ==
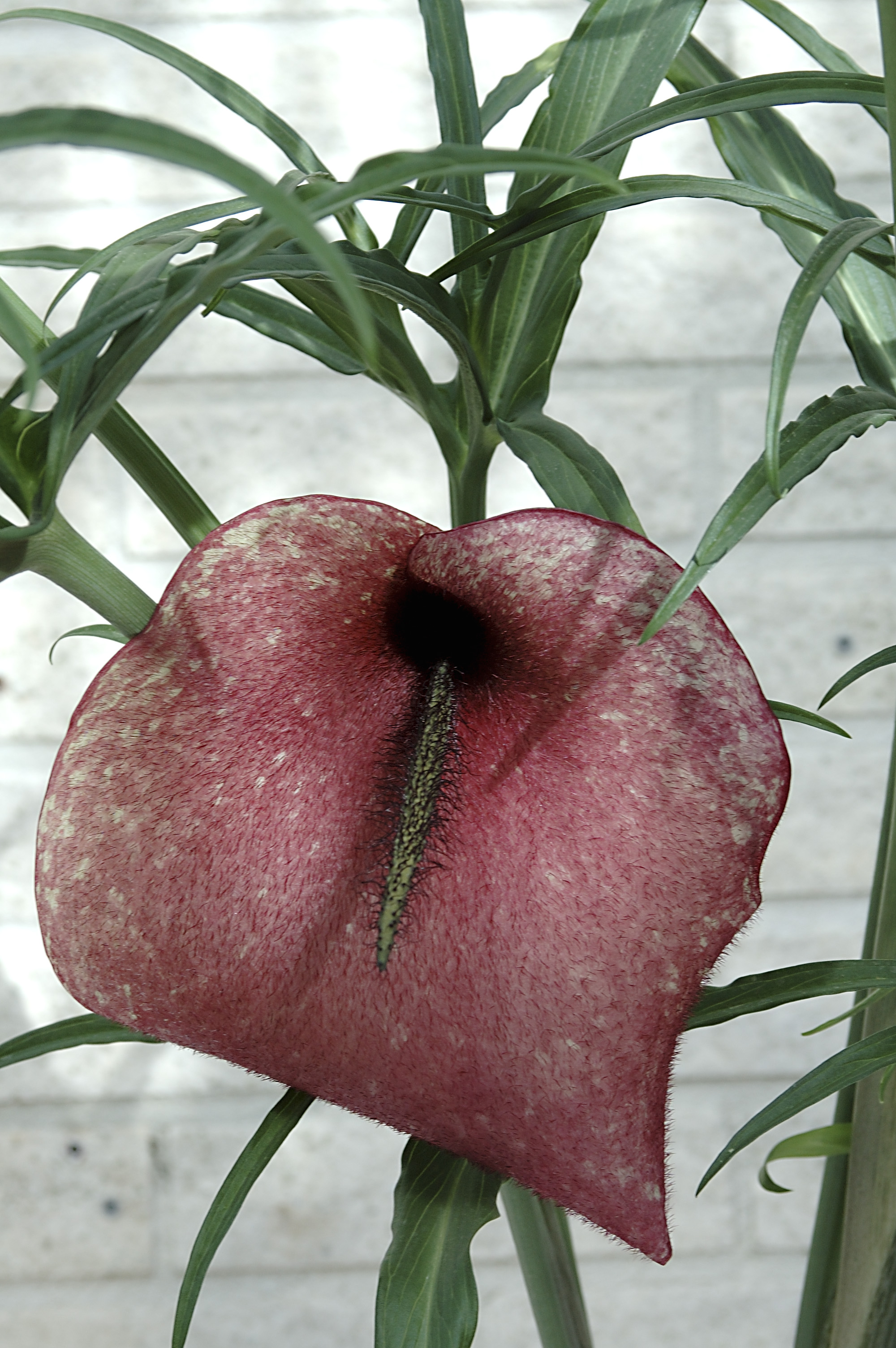
Helicodiceros muscivorus in bloom

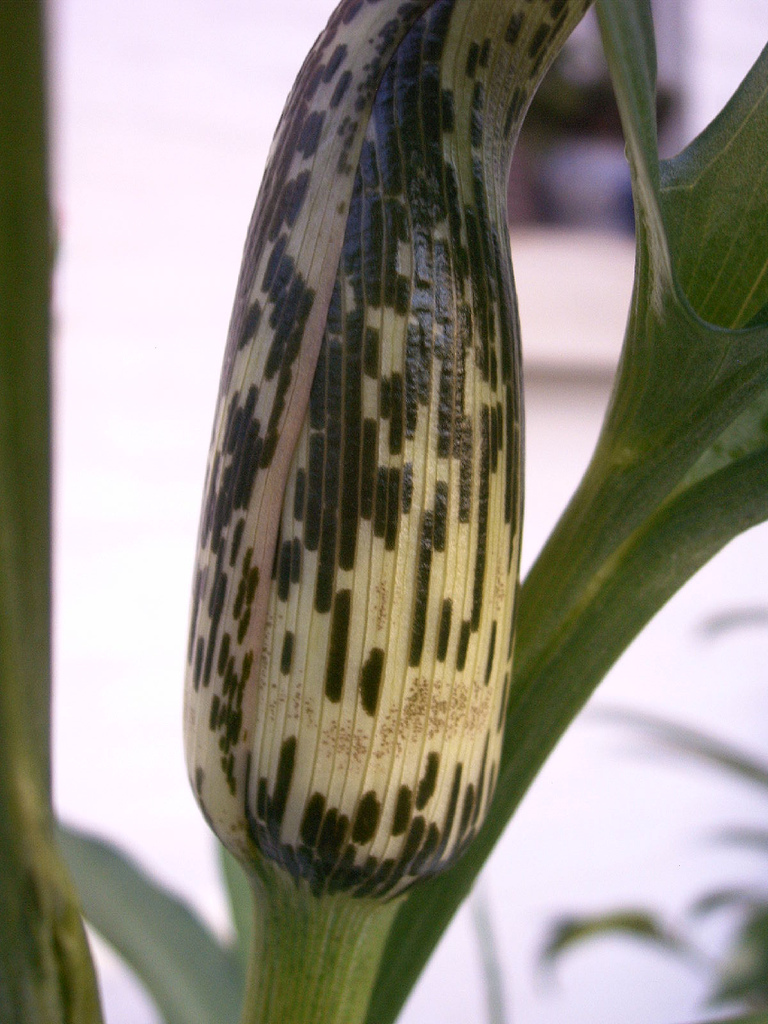
swollen base of the spathe

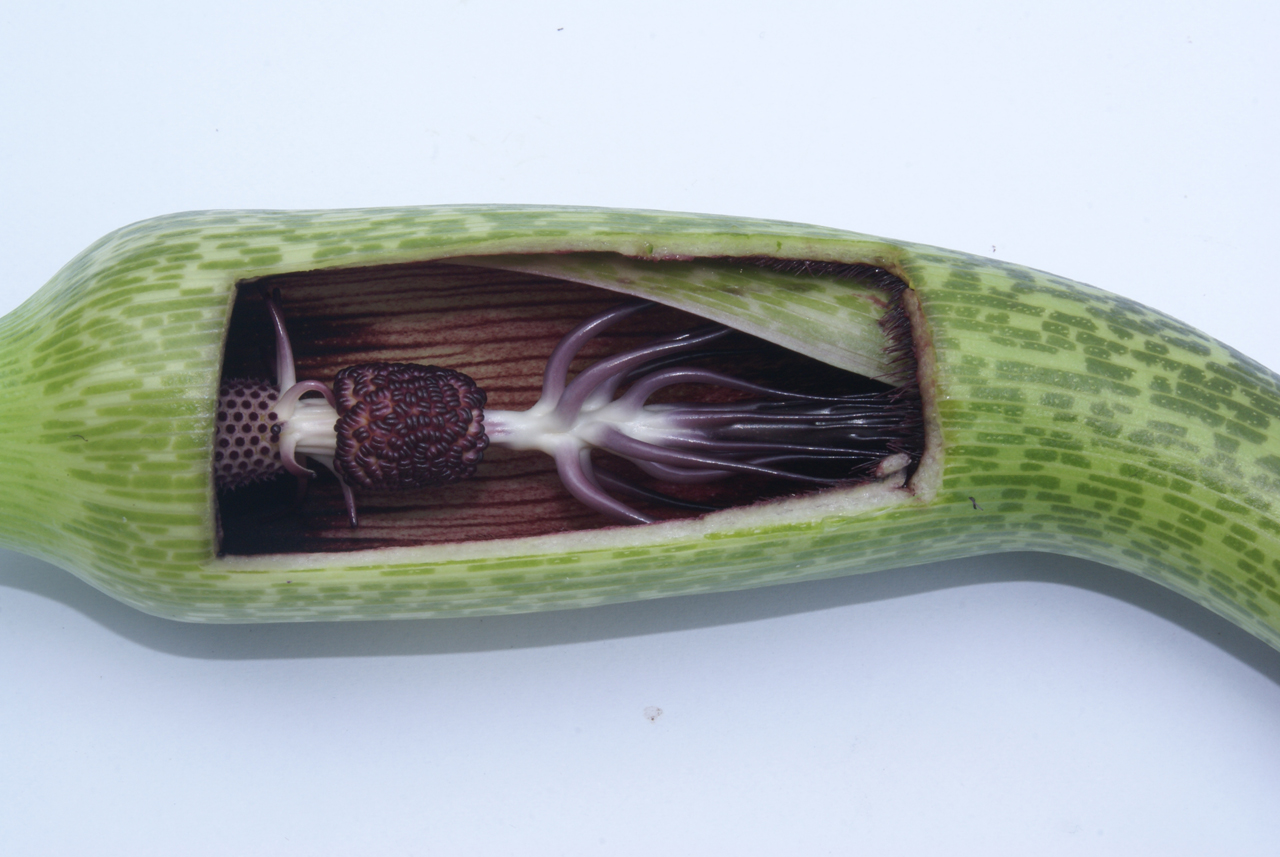
A look inside the immature inflorescence

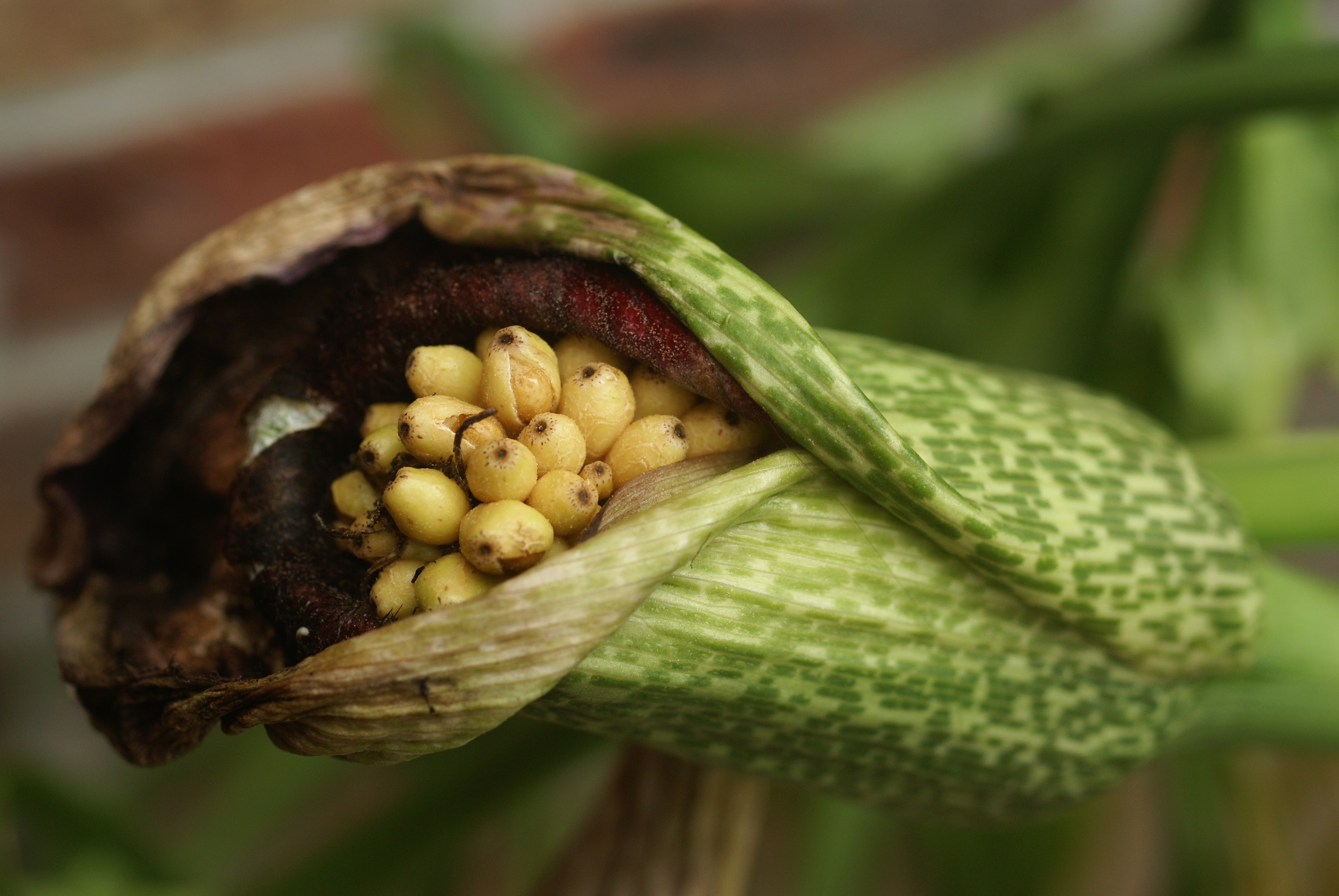
Fruits developing
