= Piricaudiopsis rhaphidophorae =

Scientific classification
- Kingdom: Fungi
- Division: Ascomycota
- Class: incertae sedis
- Genus: Piricaudiopsis
- Species: P. rhaphidophorae

Binomial name
- Piricaudiopsis rhaphidophorae Zhang & Zhang, 2009

Species of fungus

Piricaudiopsis rhaphidophorae is a fungus occurring on dead branches of Rhaphidophora decursiva, hence its name. It was first found in a tropical forest in southern China. It differs from other Piricaudiopsis species in conidial morphology and in the proliferation of its conidiogenous cell. The presence or proliferation of the conidiogenous cells and the conidial appendages, as well as the height of its conidia are considered putative phylogenetic characters of this genus.
