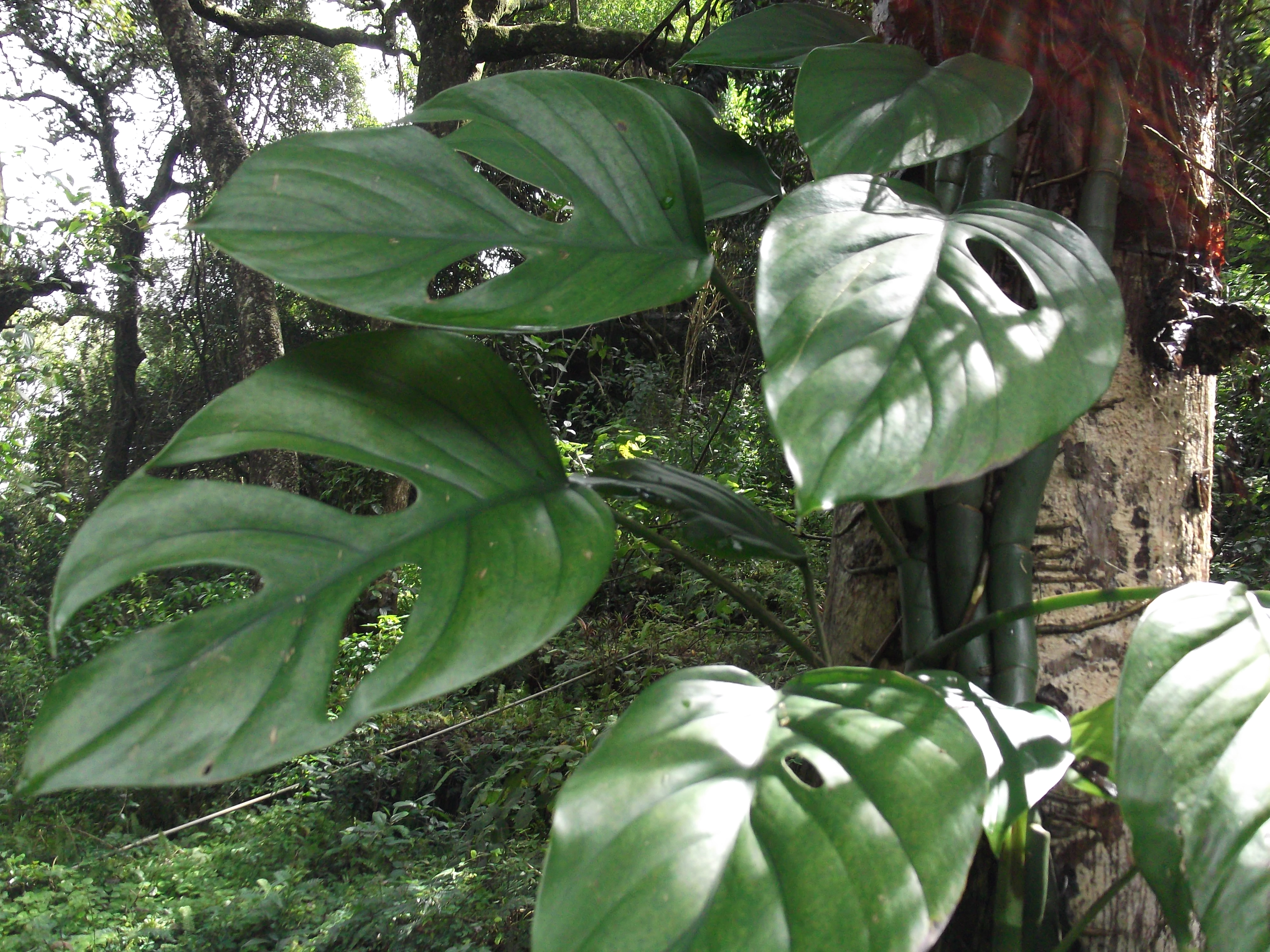

Scientific classification
- Kingdom: Plantae
- Clade: Tracheophytes
- Clade: Angiosperms
- Clade: Monocots
- Order: Alismatales
- Family: Araceae
- Genus: Rhaphidophora
- Species: R. pertusa

Binomial name
- Rhaphidophora pertusa (Roxb.) Schott 1857

= Rhaphidophora pertusa =

Species of plant

Rhaphidophora pertusa is a climbing species of aroid plant within the genus Rhaphidophora of the Araceae family. The species—which, superficially, is quite similar to R. tetrasperma—is found on the Andaman-Nicobar Islands and the Maldives, as well as in Bangladesh, India, Myanmar, Thailand and Sri Lanka.

In 2022 and 2023, the species became somewhat more readily available on the international houseplant market, leading to some confusion among newer plant collectors and gardeners; at first glance, R. pertusa resembles the so-called ‘Mini Monstera’, which is technically R. tetrasperma, causing some bloggers and plant vendors to nickname the species the ‘Perforated Philodendron’ (another misnomer).

By comparison, R. tetrasperma is somewhat smaller in size, with leaves growing to around the size of an adult human’s hand; R. pertusa is larger-leaved and has a thicker stem, and is known to fenestrate (form leaf holes splits) at a slightly later stage than the latter, more common species, and will often unfurl new leaves without holes before gradually forming fenestrations on later leaves.
