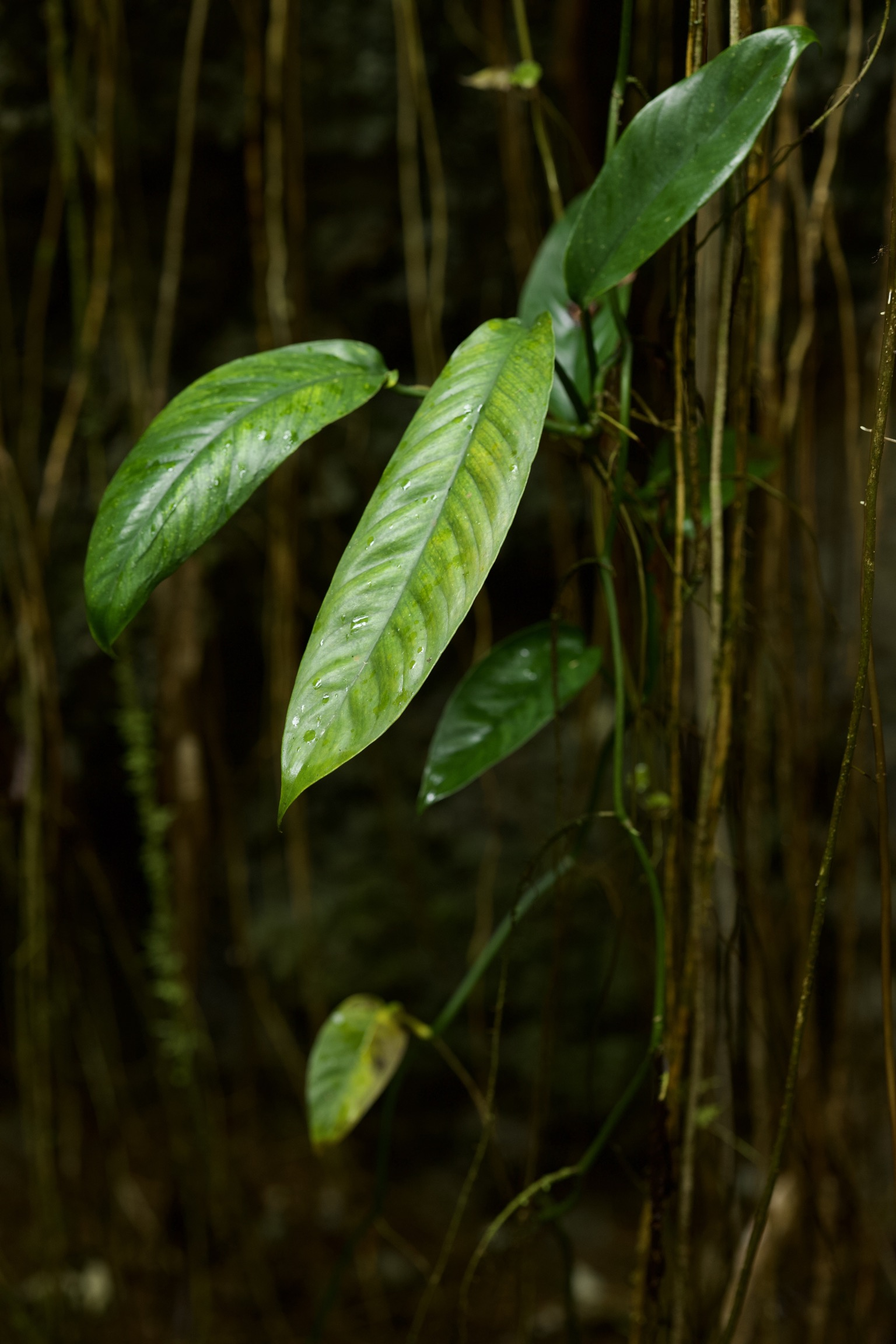

Scientific classification
- Kingdom: Plantae
- Clade: Tracheophytes
- Clade: Angiosperms
- Clade: Monocots
- Order: Alismatales
- Family: Araceae
- Genus: Rhaphidophora
- Species: R. guamensis

Binomial name
- Rhaphidophora guamensis P.C.Boyce (2001)

Synonyms
- None

= Rhaphidophora guamensis =

Climbing plant

Rhaphidophora guamensis is a climbing plant in the family Araceae that is endemic to the island of Guam in the Mariana Islands.

== Description ==
Rhaphidophora guamensis is a moderately-robust, medium-sized liana. It features leptocauly (slender primary stem with many branches). It is heterophyllous, producing two distinct kinds of leaves, one kind from non-flowering stems and the other from flowering stems. It resembles Rhaphidophora spathacea in many ways, but among distinguishing characteristics is it having solitary inflorescences at the tips of solitary shoots and a "remarkably long stigmatic stipe".

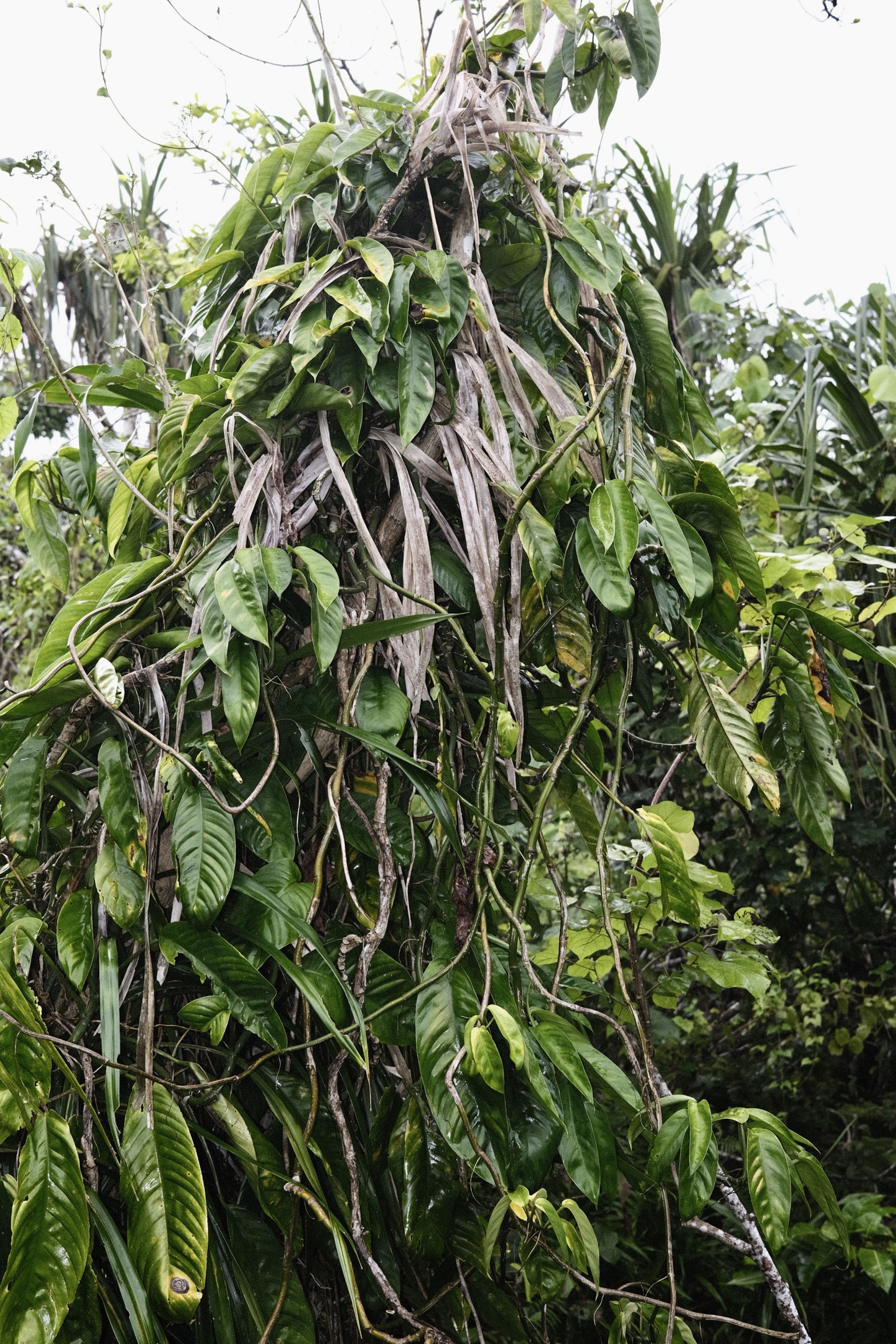

== Range and habitat ==
The species is endemic to the island of Guam, a US territory in the Mariana Islands, where it is found in mixed forests, coconut plantations and on limestone at elevations of around 400 m (1,300 ft).

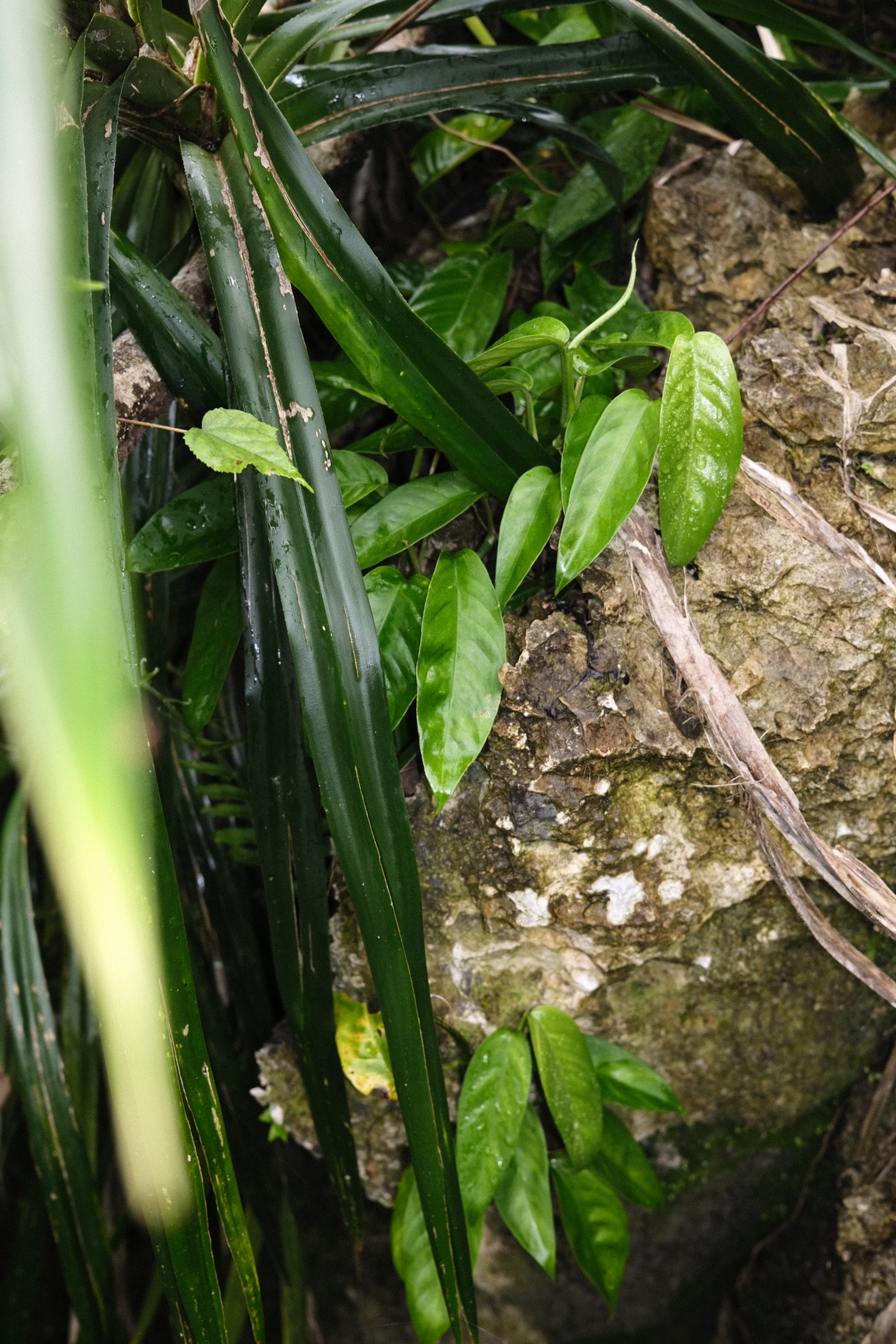

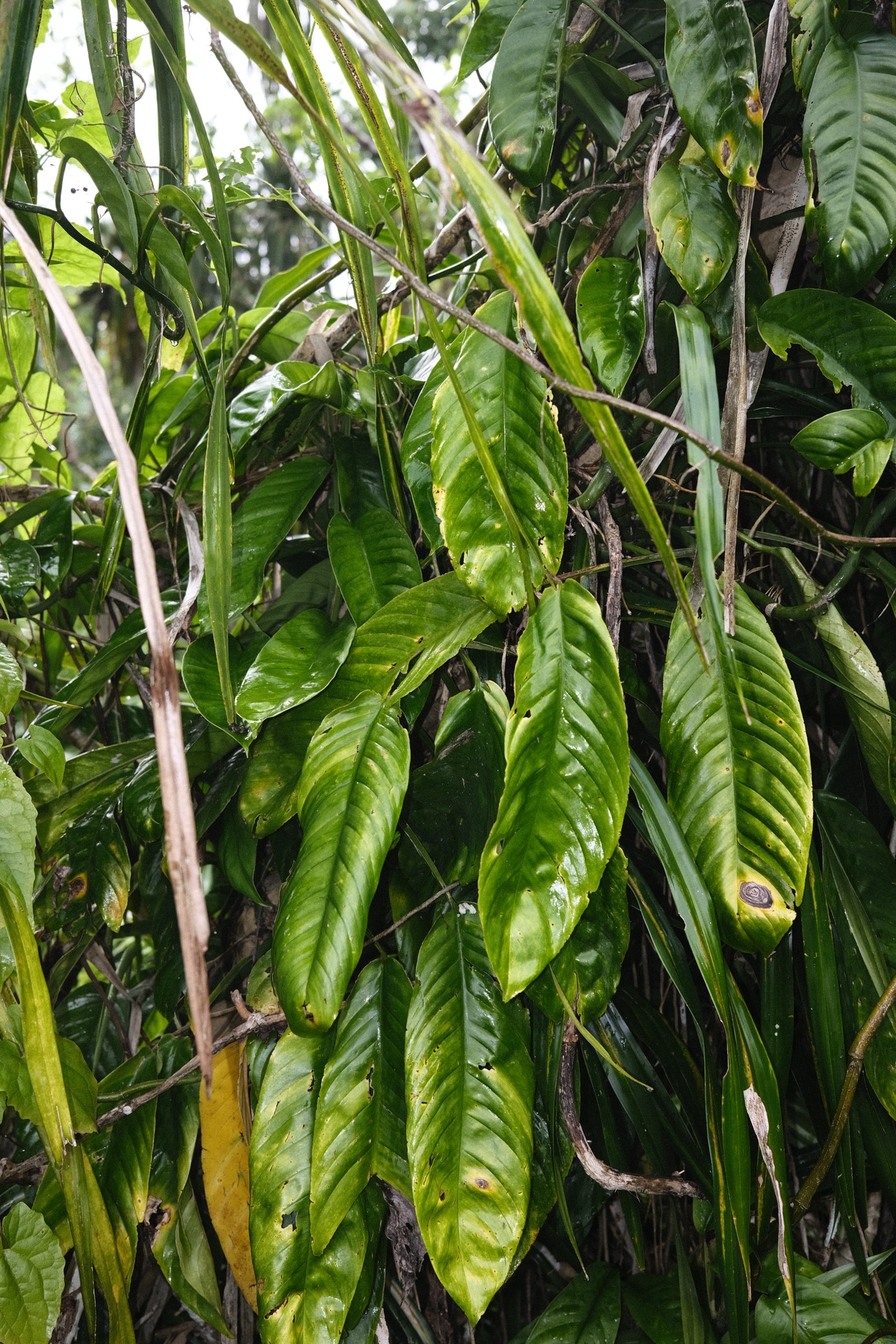

== Taxonomy ==
The species was first described in 2001 by Peter C. Boyce. The holotype is a specimen collected 28 April 1962, with the type locality given as a naval magazine near Fena Dam, on the slopes of Mount Almagosa.

Peter C. Boyce proposed 9 groups of the Rhaphidophora genus, grouping Rhaphidophora guamensis in the "Spathacea (Hollrungii) Group" with other species from Australia, New Guinea, and Micronesia (Rhaphidophora australasica, Rhaphidophora spathacea, Rhaphidophora versteegii and Rhaphidophora waria). It is most similar to Rhaphidophora spathacea from New Guinea and the Caroline Islands.

== History ==
The first herbarium specimen was collected from Mount Lamlam by Donald Anderson in 1949 for the Pacific Vegetation Project, later by Benjamin Stone (1962) and A. Rinehart (1987), labeled only as "Rhaphidophora." It was eventually described in detail and named Rhaphidophora guamensis by the British botanist, Peter C. Boyce in 2001 in The Gardens' Bulletin (Singapore).

== See also ==
List of endemic plants in the Mariana Islands
