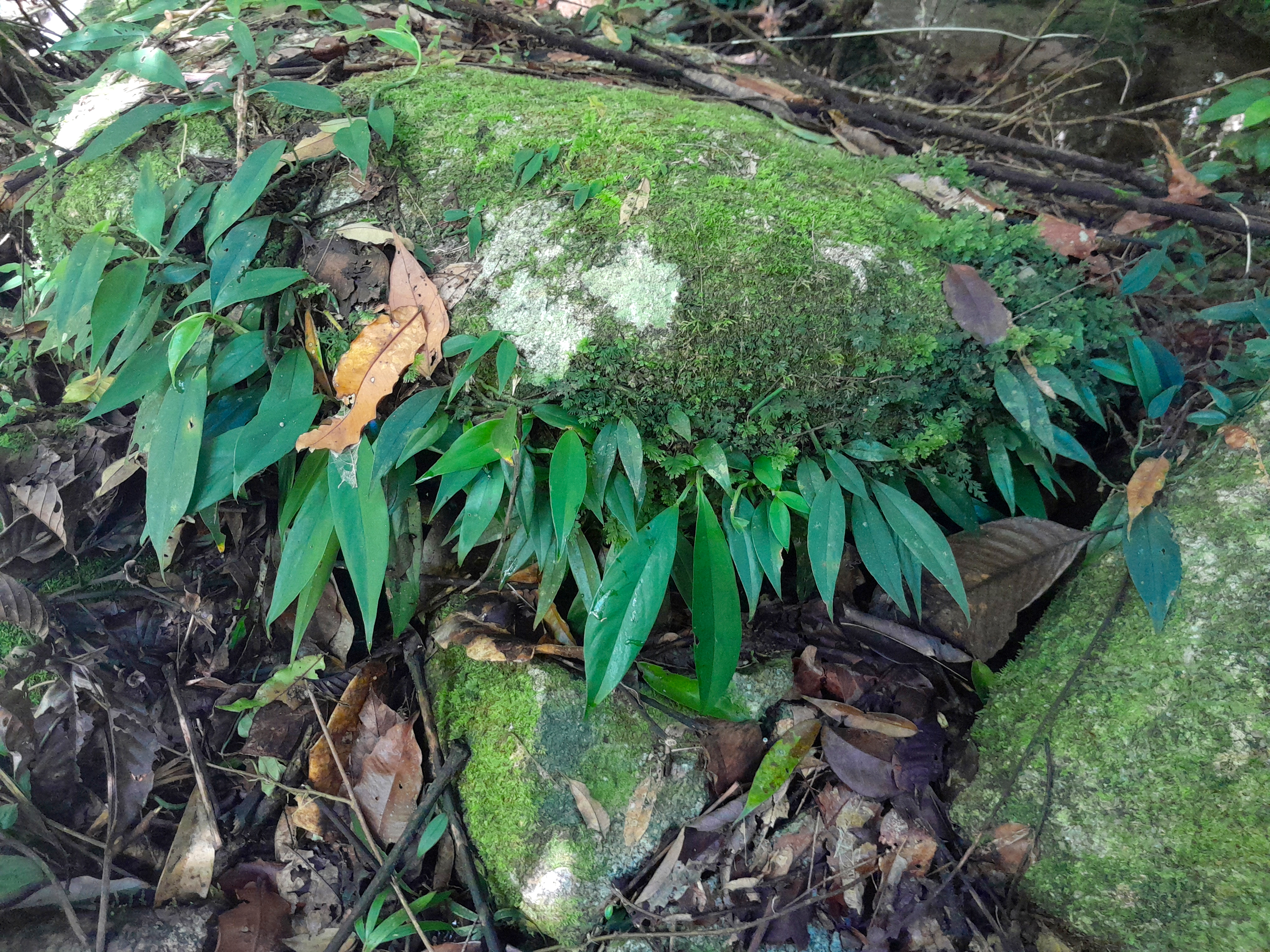
- In rainforest at Josephine Falls

Conservation status
- Least Concern (NCA)

Scientific classification
- Kingdom: Plantae
- Clade: Tracheophytes
- Clade: Angiosperms
- Clade: Monocots
- Order: Alismatales
- Family: Araceae
- Genus: Rhaphidophora
- Species: R. petrieana

Binomial name
- Rhaphidophora petrieana A.Hay

= Rhaphidophora petrieana =

Species of flowering plant

Rhaphidophora petrieana is a plant in the arum family Araceae that is only found in the Wet Tropics bioregion of northeastern Queensland, Australia.

== Description ==
Rhaphidophora petrieana is a semi-epiphytic, robust, herbaceous, root climber reaching about 20 m (66 ft) tall. The mid-green leaves are narrowly ovate to elliptic and measure up to 18 cm (7.1 in) long by 6 cm (2.4 in) wide. The inflorescence is a spadix about 6 cm (2.4 in) long, enclosed in a spathe about 8 cm (3.1 in) long.

== Taxonomy ==
This species was first described in 1993 by the Australian botanist Alistair Hay, and published in the journal Telopea. The type specimen was collected by Bruce Gray in 1982 from a National Park reserve west of Innisfail.

== Distribution and habitat ==
Rhaphidophora petrieana occurs in rainforest from Cape Tribulation south to about Innisfail, at altitudes from sea level to about 800 m (2,600 ft). There has also been isolated collections from near Lockhart River, about 200 km (120 mi) north of Cape Tribulation.

== Conservation ==
This species is listed by the Queensland Government's Department of Environment, Science and Innovation as least concern. As of 2 April 2024, it has not been assessed by the International Union for Conservation of Nature (IUCN).

== Gallery ==
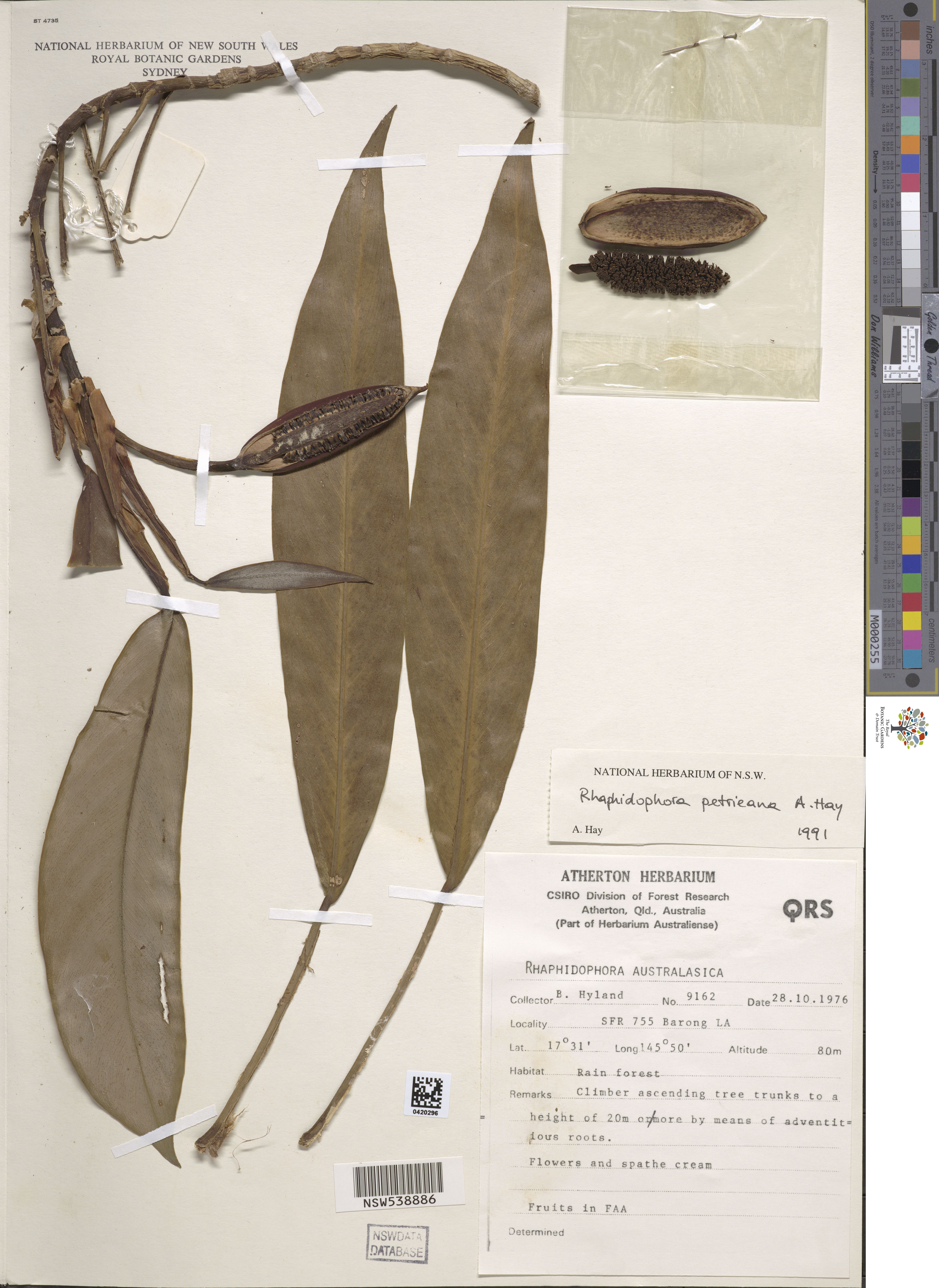
Herbarium specimen

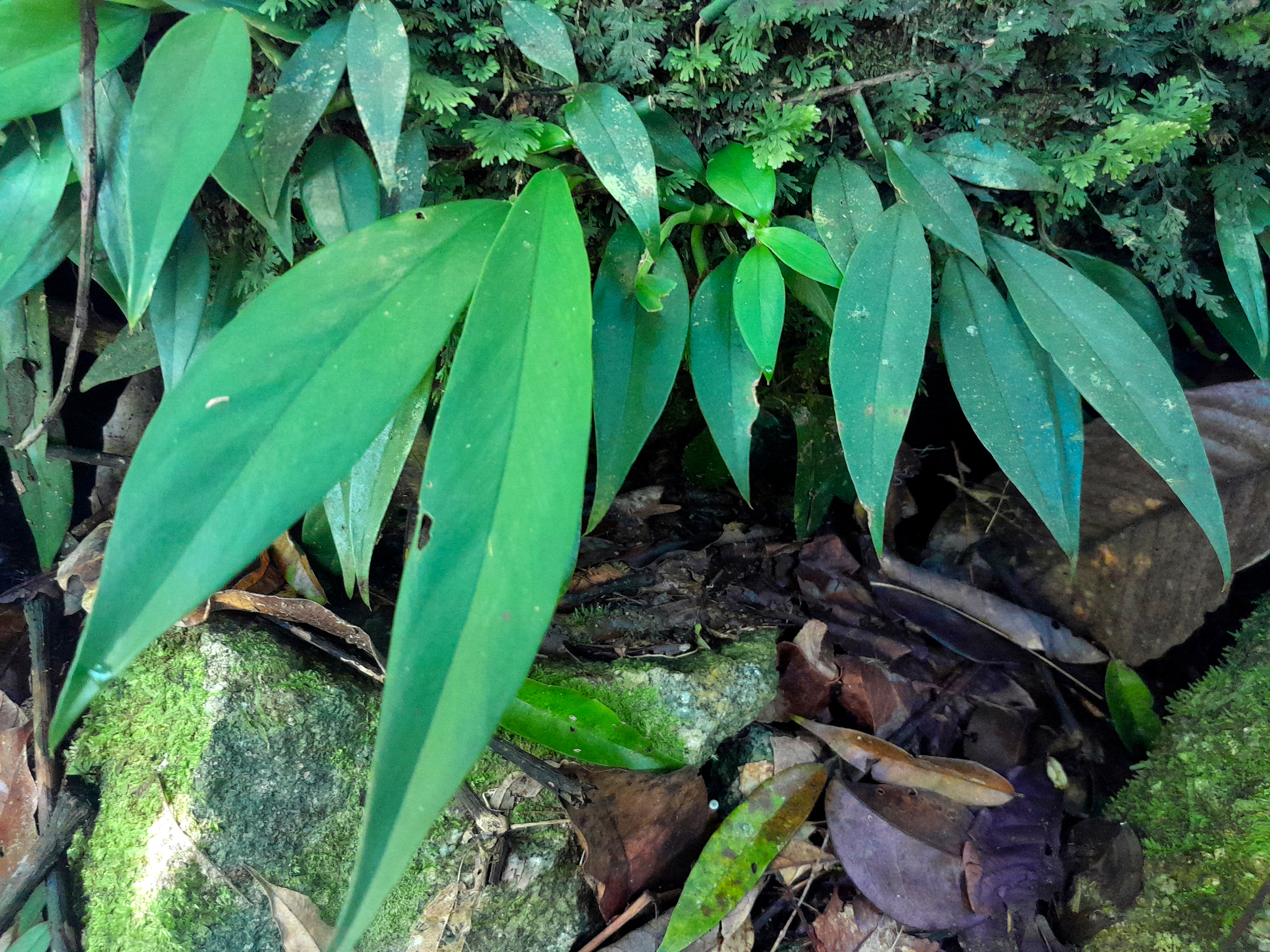
Foliage

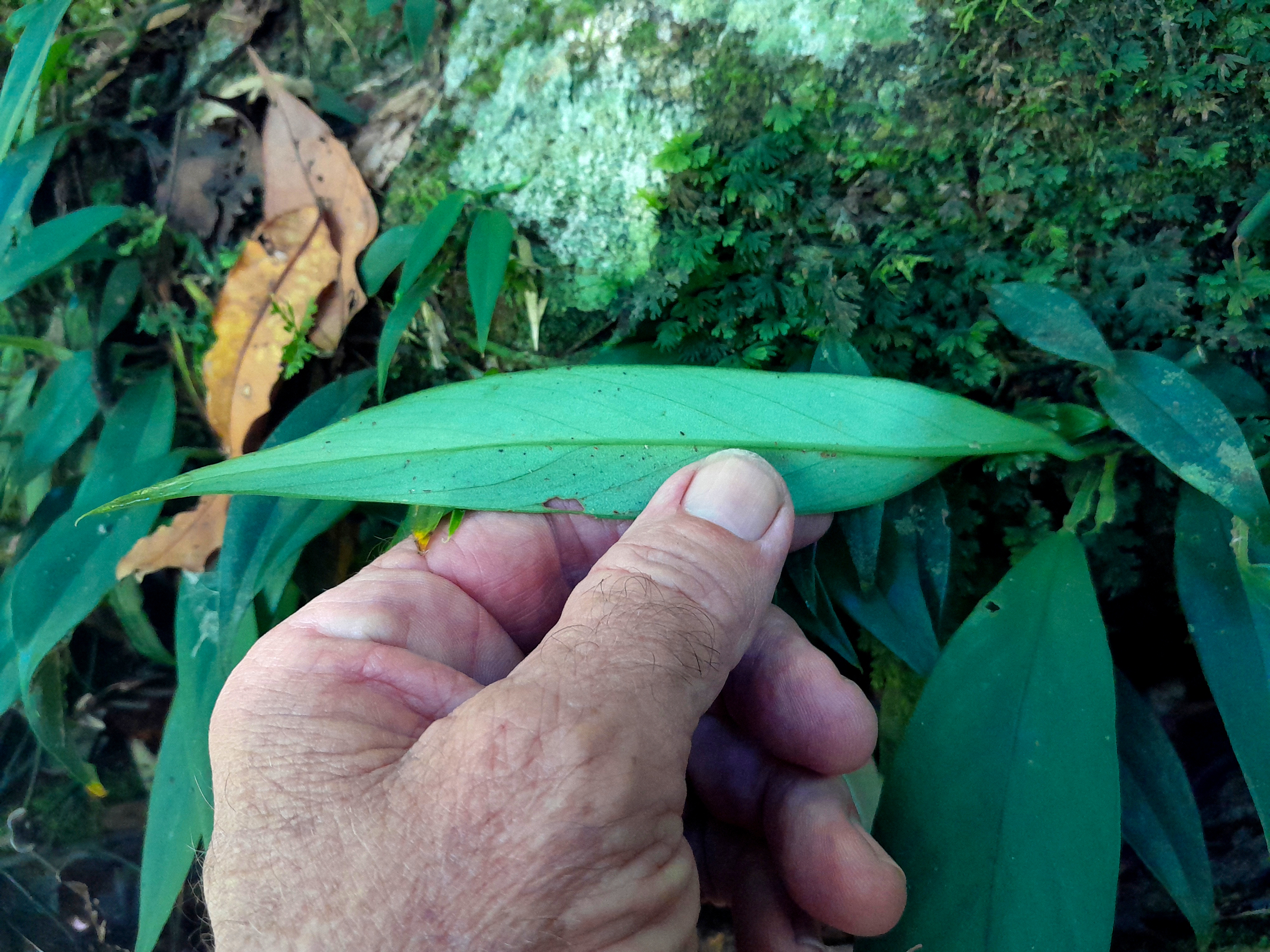

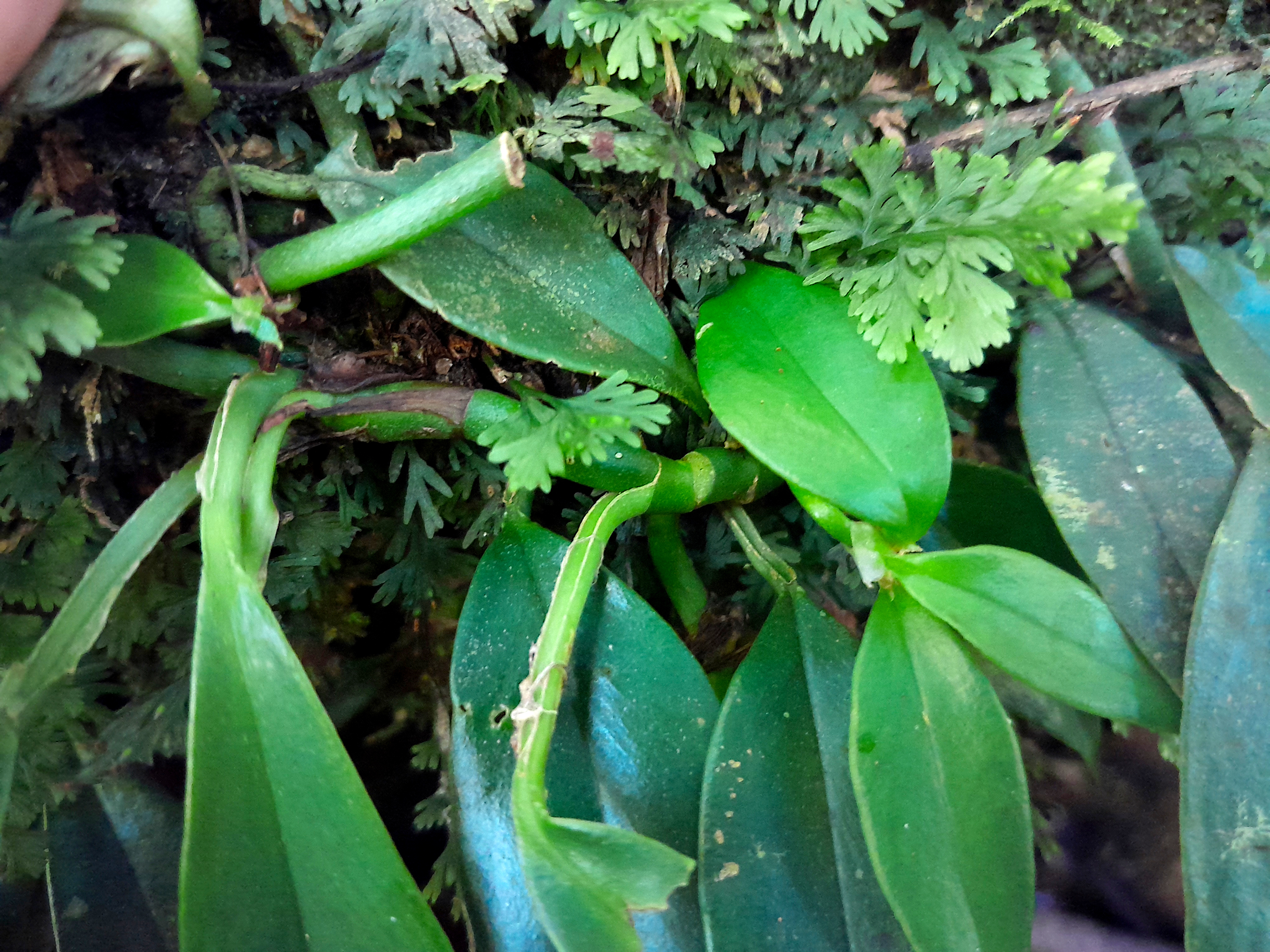
Stem and petioles

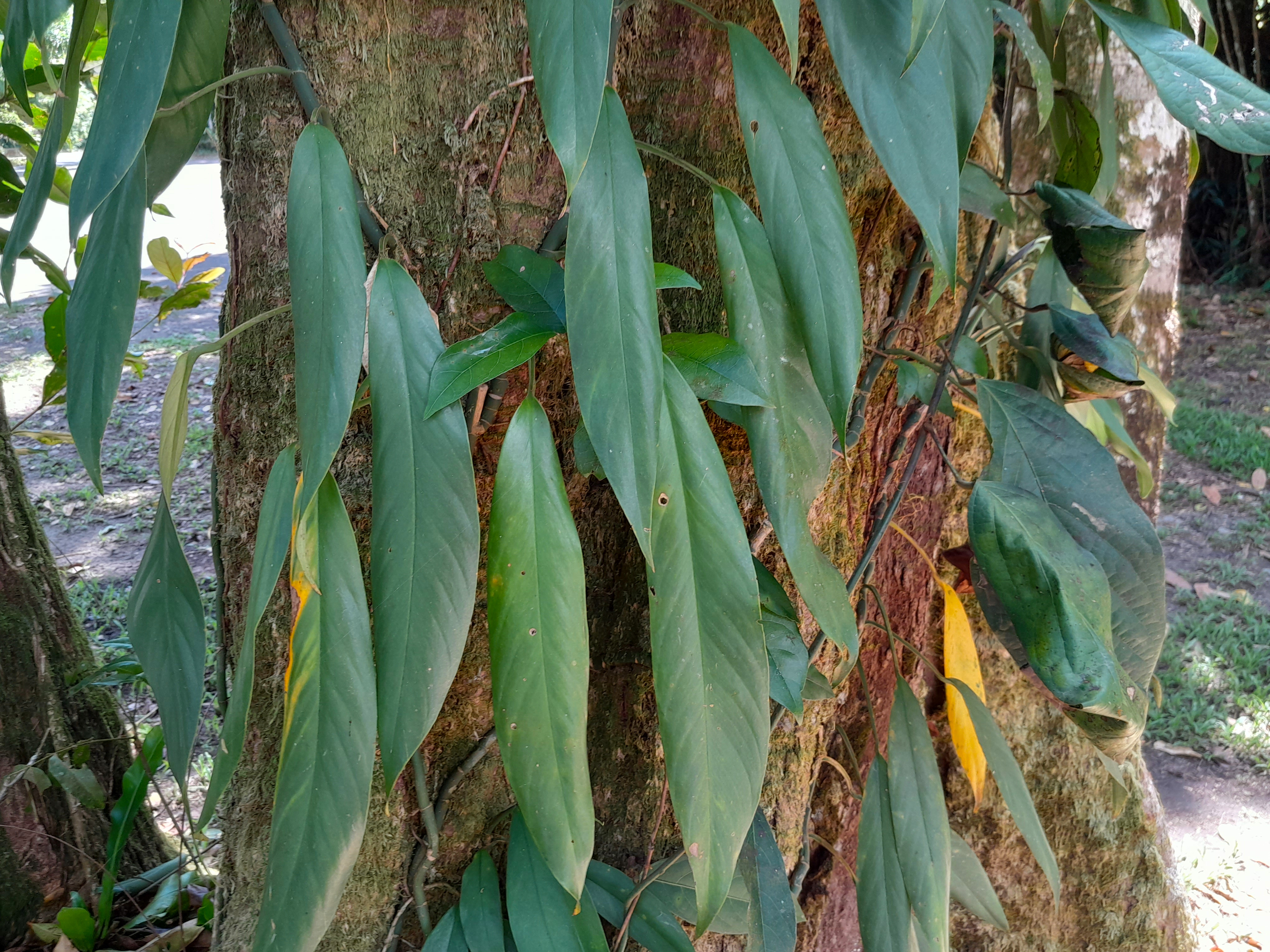
