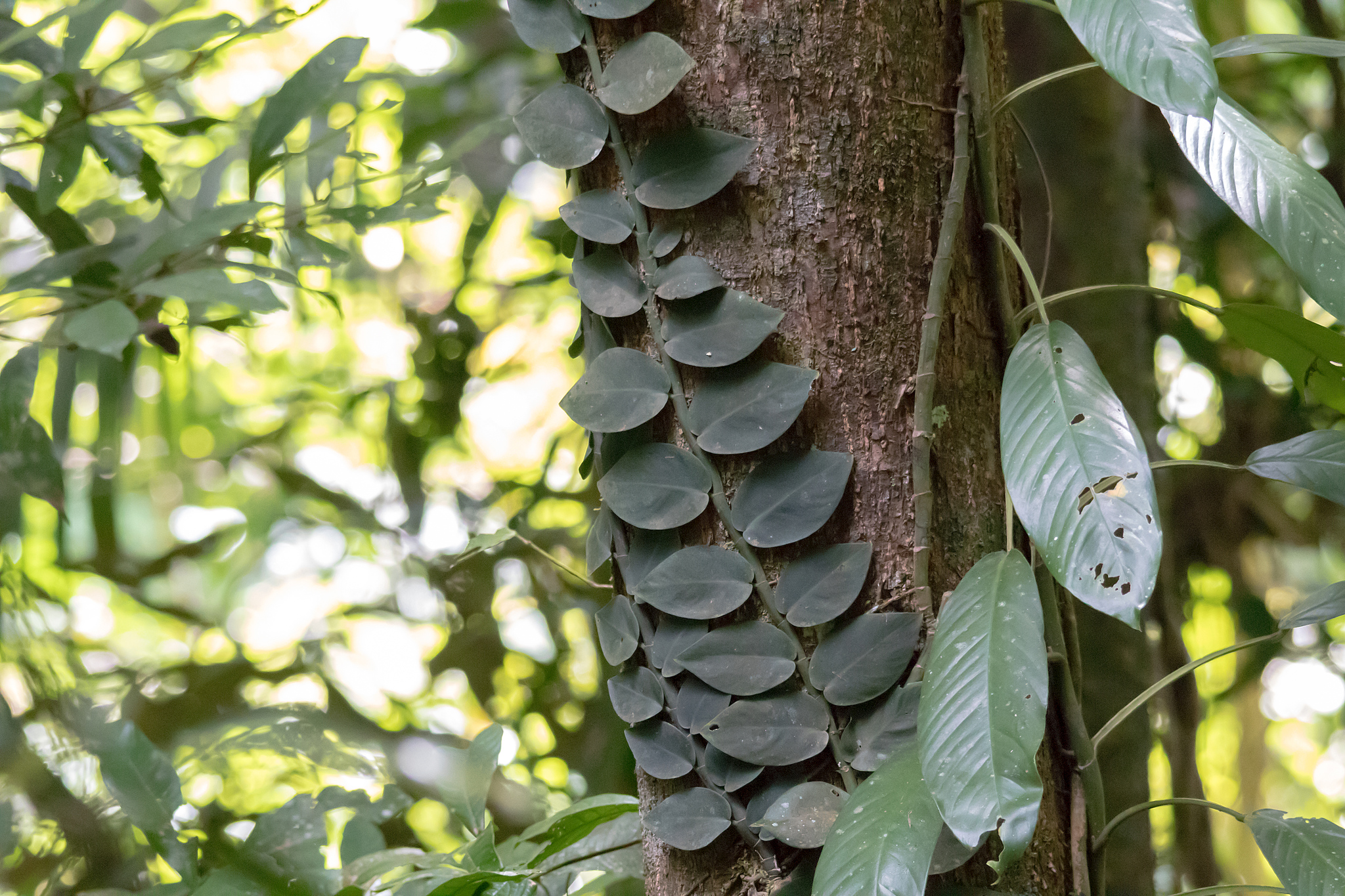

Conservation status
- Least Concern (NCA)

Scientific classification
- Kingdom: Plantae
- Clade: Tracheophytes
- Clade: Angiosperms
- Clade: Monocots
- Order: Alismatales
- Family: Araceae
- Genus: Rhaphidophora
- Species: R. hayi

Binomial name
- Rhaphidophora hayi P.C.Boyce & Bogner

= Rhaphidophora hayi =

Species of plant

Rhaphidophora hayi is a species of flowering plant in the arum family Araceae, native to New Guinea, the Bismarck Archipelago, the Solomon Islands and the Australian state of Queensland. It is an appressed or shingling semi-epiphytic vining plant that grows in wet tropical forests.

== Conservation ==
This species is listed as least concern in the Queensland Government's Wildnet database. As of 10 September 2026, it has not been assessed by the International Union for Conservation of Nature.
