= Piricaudiopsis rosae =

Scientific classification
- Kingdom: Fungi
- Division: Ascomycota
- Class: incertae sedis
- Genus: Piricaudiopsis
- Species: P. rosae

Binomial name
- Piricaudiopsis rosae Zhang & Zhang, 2009

Species of fungus

Piricaudiopsis rosae is a fungus occurring on dead branches of Rosa chinensis, hence its name. It was first found in a tropical forest in southern China. It differs from other Piricaudiopsis species in conidial morphology and in the proliferation of its conidiogenous cell. The presence or proliferation of the conidiogenous cells and the conidial appendages, as well as the height of its conidia are considered putative phylogenetic characters of this genus.
