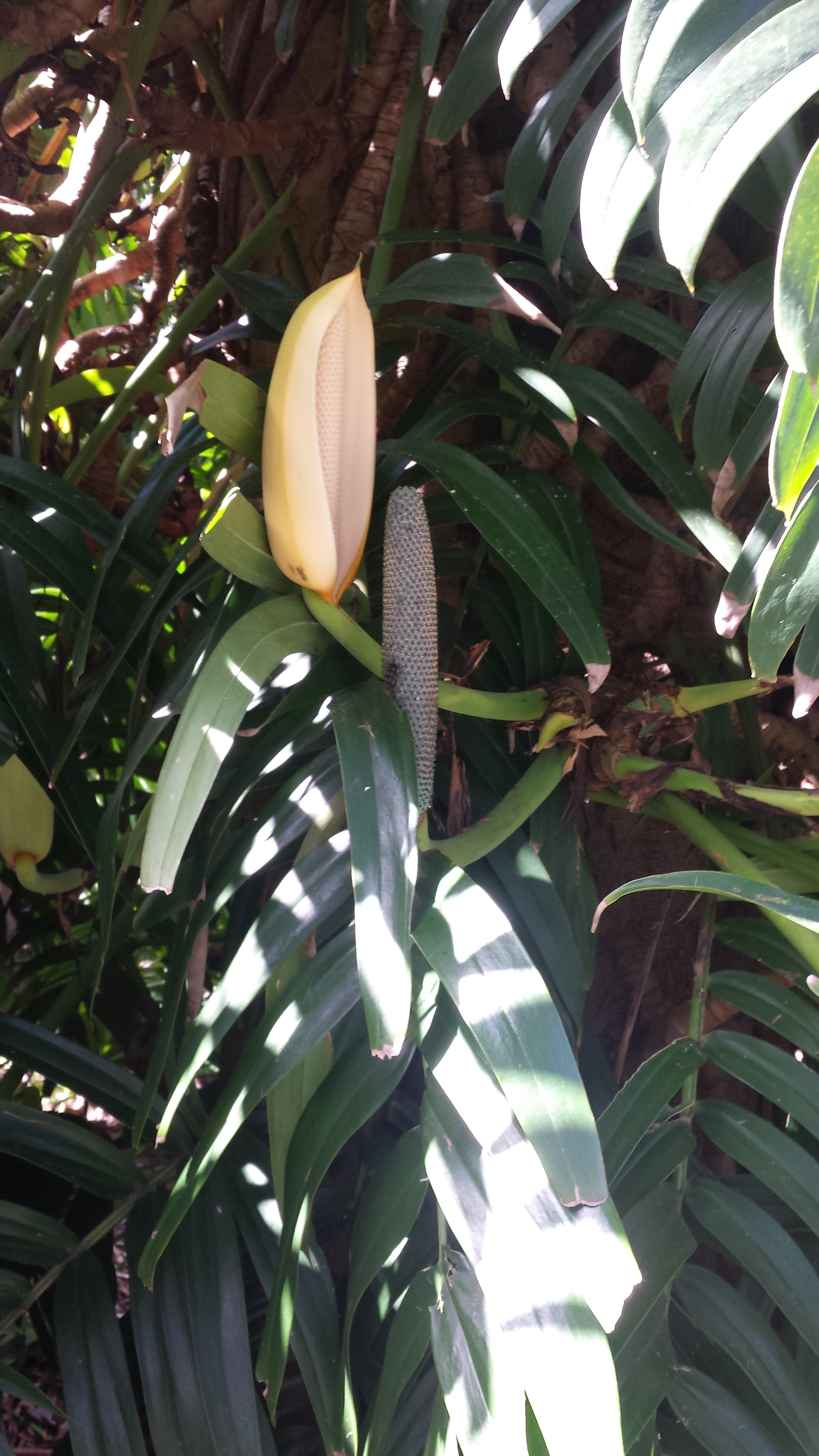
- Rhaphidophora neglecta

Scientific classification
- Kingdom: Plantae
- Clade: Tracheophytes
- Clade: Angiosperms
- Clade: Monocots
- Order: Alismatales
- Family: Araceae
- Subfamily: Monsteroideae
- Tribe: Monstereae
- Genus: Rhaphidophora; Hassk.

Synonyms
- Raphidophora Hassk.; Afrorhaphidophora Engl.

= Rhaphidophora =

Genus of plants

Rhaphidophora is a genus in the family Araceae, occurring from tropical Africa eastwards through Malesia and Australasia to the Western Pacific. The genus consists of approximately 100 species.

== Description ==
This is a genus of evergreen, robust, climbing plants. The flowers are bisexual, lacking a perianth. The spathe is shed after flowering. The ovules number eight or more and are superposed on two (rarely 3) parietal placentas of the ovary. The flowers produce many, ellipsoid, straight seeds with a brittle and smooth outer coat (testa).

These are hemiepiphytes, plants capable of beginning life as a seed and sending roots to the soil, or beginning as a terrestrial plant that climbs a tree and then sends roots back to the soil. In rare cases they are terrestrial rheophytes (plants that grow in fast-flowing water).

Their bast fibers have typically abundant, long and slender trichosclereids, merging with the fibers of the sclerenchyma. If the blade of the leaf is torn, many hairs become apparent. The leaf stalks bend abruptly at their top. The leaf margin is entire. The leaves are pinnatifid to pinnatisect (cut with deep opposite lobing). The leaf venation is parallel (with veins running parallel for the length of the leaf), pinnate (one mid-vein with smaller veins branching off laterally) to reticulate (feather-veined).

== Heterotypic synonyms ==
- Raphidophora Hassk., Tijdschr. Natuurl. Gesch. Physiol. 9: 168 (1842), orth. var.
- Afrorhaphidophora Engl. in H.G.A.Engler & K.A.E.Prantl, Nat. Pflanzenfam., Nachtr. 3: 31 (1906).

== Taxonomy ==
Research on the chloroplast DNA sequence data (trnL-F) has shown that Rhaphidophora and Epipremnum are paraphyletic, forming three informal groups with other genera of the paraphyletic tribe Monstereae. This may result in taxonomic changes in this genus. The genera Rhaphidophora, Epipremnum, and Monstera are poorly differentiated.

One cultivar, Rhaphidophora excelsa `Exotica' has been recognized.

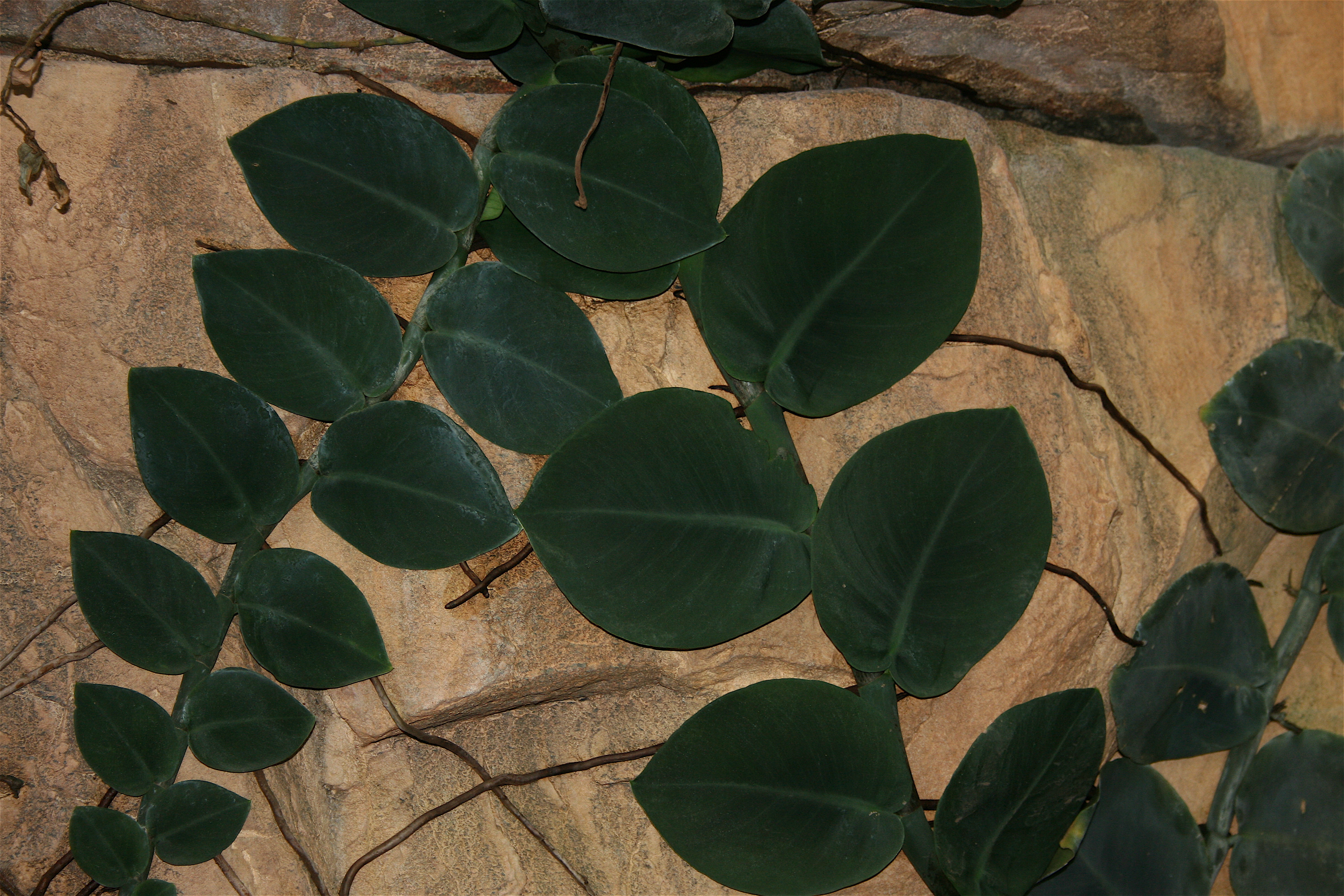
Rhaphidophora korthalsii

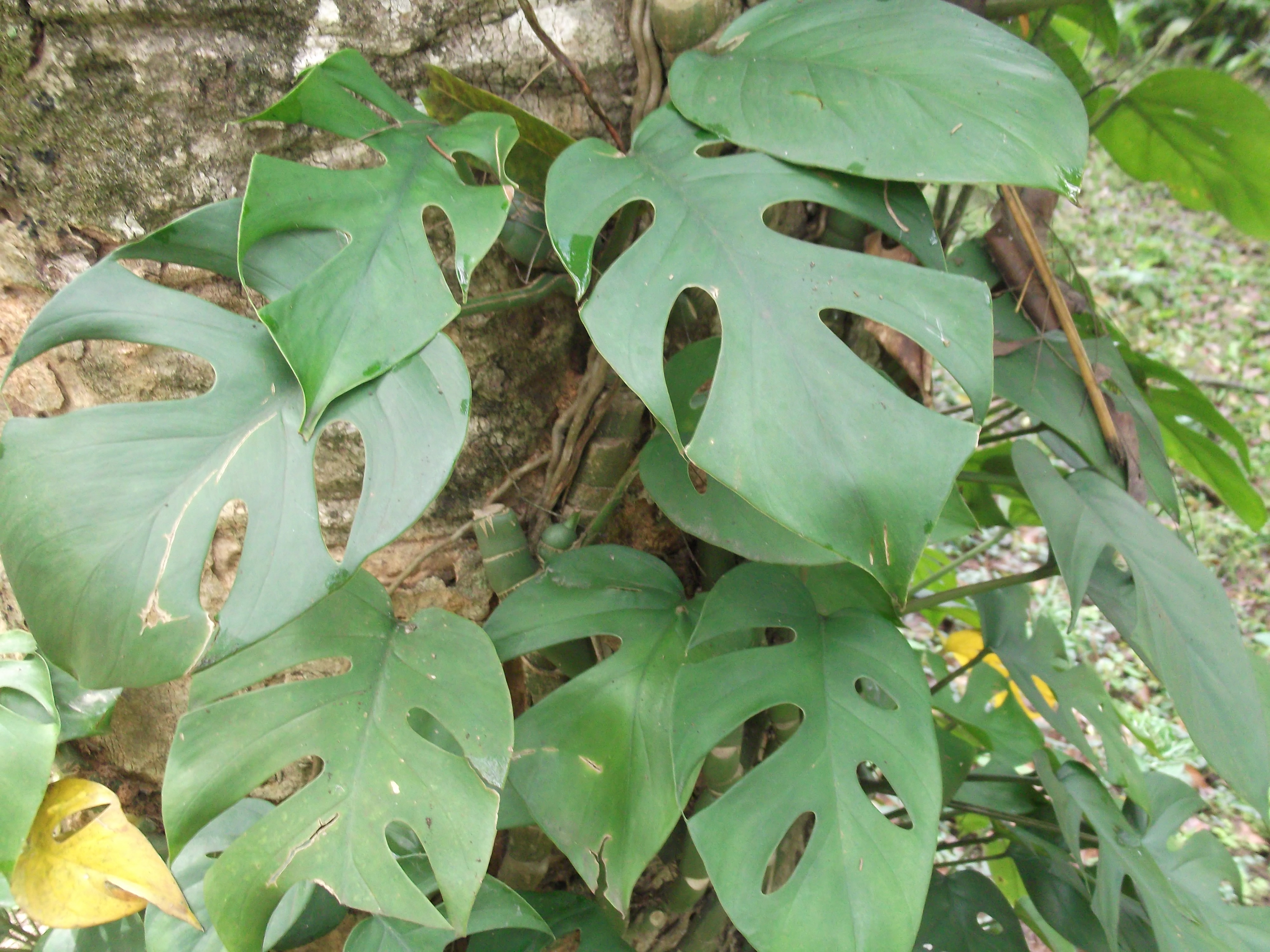
Raphidophora pertusa

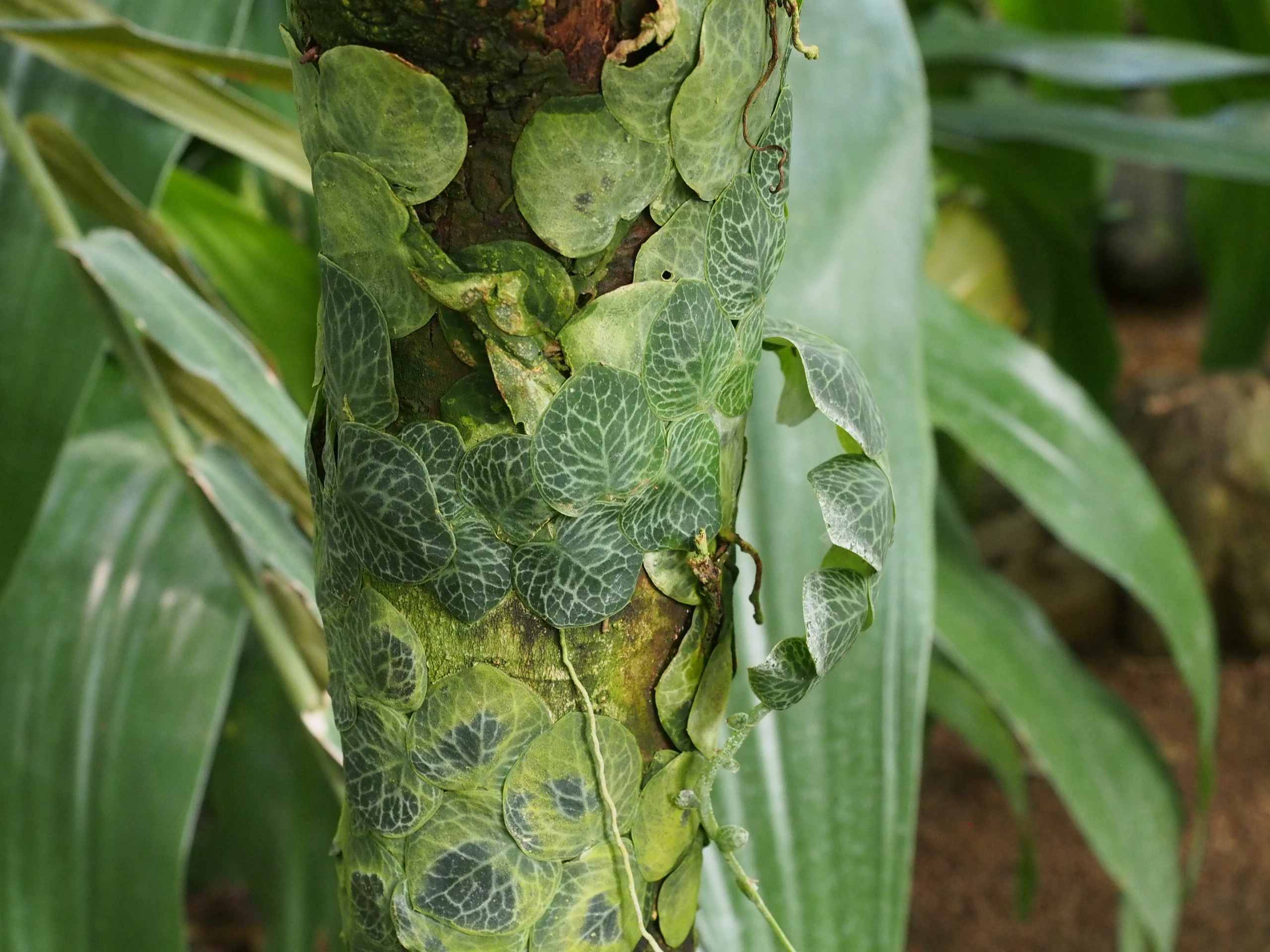
Rhaphidophora cryptantha

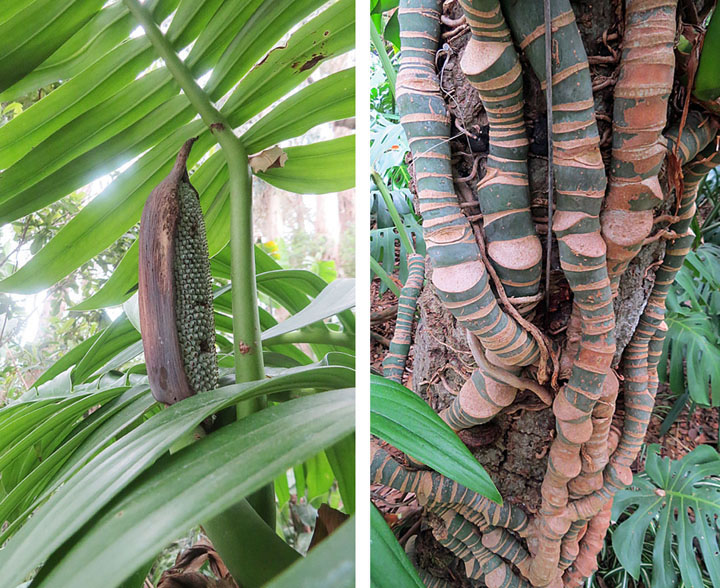
Raphidorphora decursiva

== Species ==
The following is a list of all 105 species accepted by Plants of the World Online as of 30 March 2024:

- Rhaphidophora acuminata Merr.
- Rhaphidophora africana N.E.Br.
- Rhaphidophora angustata Schott
- Rhaphidophora araea P.C.Boyce
- Rhaphidophora australasica F.M.Bailey
- Rhaphidophora balgooyi P.C.Boyce
- Rhaphidophora banosensis P.C.Boyce
- Rhaphidophora beccarii (Engl.) Engl.
- Rhaphidophora bogneri P.C.Boyce & Haigh
- Rhaphidophora bonii Engl. & K.Krause
- Rhaphidophora brevispathacea Engl. & K.Krause
- Rhaphidophora burkilliana Ridl.
- Rhaphidophora calophylla Schott
- Rhaphidophora chevalieri Gagnep.
- Rhaphidophora conica Engl.
- Rhaphidophora conocephala Alderw.
- Rhaphidophora corneri P.C.Boyce
- Rhaphidophora crassicaulis Engl. & K.Krause
- Rhaphidophora crassifolia Hook.f.
- Rhaphidophora cravenschoddeana P.C.Boyce
- Rhaphidophora cretosa P.C.Boyce
- Rhaphidophora cryptantha P.C.Boyce & C.M.Allen
- Rhaphidophora cylindrosperma Engl. & K.Krause
- Rhaphidophora dahlii Engl.
- Rhaphidophora decursiva (Roxb.) Schott
- Rhaphidophora discolor Engl. & K.Krause
- Rhaphidophora dulongensis H.Li
- Rhaphidophora elliptica Ridl.
- Rhaphidophora elliptifolia Merr.
- Rhaphidophora elmeri Engl. & K.Krause
- Rhaphidophora falcata Ridl.
- Rhaphidophora floresensis P.C.Boyce
- Rhaphidophora foraminifera (Engl.) Engl.
- Rhaphidophora formosana Engl.
- Rhaphidophora fortis P.C.Boyce
- Rhaphidophora geniculata Engl.
- Rhaphidophora glauca (Wall.) Schott
- Rhaphidophora gorokensis P.C.Boyce
- Rhaphidophora guamensis P.C.Boyce
- Rhaphidophora hayi P.C.Boyce & Bogner
- Rhaphidophora hongkongensis Schott
- Rhaphidophora hookeri Schott
- Rhaphidophora intonsa P.C.Boyce
- Rhaphidophora intrusa P.C.Boyce
- Rhaphidophora jubata P.C.Boyce
- Rhaphidophora kokodensis P.C.Boyce
- Rhaphidophora koordersii Engl.
- Rhaphidophora korthalsii Schott
- Rhaphidophora lacduongensis V.D.Nguyen & B.H.Quang
- Rhaphidophora laichauensis Gagnep.
- Rhaphidophora lancifolia Schott
- Rhaphidophora latevaginata M.Hotta
- Rhaphidophora liukiuensis Hatus.
- Rhaphidophora lobbii Schott
- Rhaphidophora luchunensis H.Li
- Rhaphidophora maingayi Hook.f.
- Rhaphidophora megaphylla H.Li
- Rhaphidophora megasperma Engl.
- Rhaphidophora megastigma Engl.
- Rhaphidophora microperforata S.Y.Wong & P.C.Boyce
- Rhaphidophora microspadix K.Krause
- Rhaphidophora mima P.C.Boyce
- Rhaphidophora minor Hook.f.
- Rhaphidophora moluccensis Engl. & K.Krause
- Rhaphidophora montana (Blume) Schott
- Rhaphidophora monticola K.Krause
- Rhaphidophora muluensis S.Y.Wong & P.C.Boyce
- Rhaphidophora neglecta A.Hay & P.C.Boyce
- Rhaphidophora neoguineensis Engl.
- Rhaphidophora nicolsonii P.C.Boyce
- Rhaphidophora okapensis P.C.Boyce & Bogner
- Rhaphidophora oligosperma Alderw.
- Rhaphidophora ovoidea A.Chev.
- Rhaphidophora pachyphylla K.Krause
- Rhaphidophora parvifolia Alderw.
- Rhaphidophora peepla (Roxb.) Schott
- Rhaphidophora peeploides Engl.
- Rhaphidophora perkinsiae Engl.
- Rhaphidophora pertusa (Roxb.) Schott
- Rhaphidophora petrieana A.Hay
- Rhaphidophora philippinensis Engl. & K.Krause
- Rhaphidophora pilosa P.C.Boyce
- Rhaphidophora puberula Engl.
- Rhaphidophora pusilla N.E.Br.
- Rhaphidophora sabit P.C.Boyce
- Rhaphidophora sarasinorum Engl.
- Rhaphidophora schlechteri K.Krause
- Rhaphidophora sonlaensis V.D.Nguyen & P.C.Boyce
- Rhaphidophora spathacea Schott
- Rhaphidophora spuria (Schott) Nicolson
- Rhaphidophora stenophylla K.Krause
- Rhaphidophora stolleana Engl. & K.Krause
- Rhaphidophora sulcata Gagnep.
- Rhaphidophora sylvestris (Blume) Engl.
- Rhaphidophora talamauana Alderw.
- Rhaphidophora tenuis Engl.
- Rhaphidophora ternatensis Alderw.
- Rhaphidophora tetrasperma Hook.f.
- Rhaphidophora teysmanniana Engl. & K.Krause
- Rhaphidophora todayensis K.Krause
- Rhaphidophora tonkinensis Engl. & K.Krause
- Rhaphidophora typha P.C.Boyce
- Rhaphidophora ustulata P.C.Boyce
- Rhaphidophora versteegii Engl. & K.Krause
- Rhaphidophora waria P.C.Boyce
