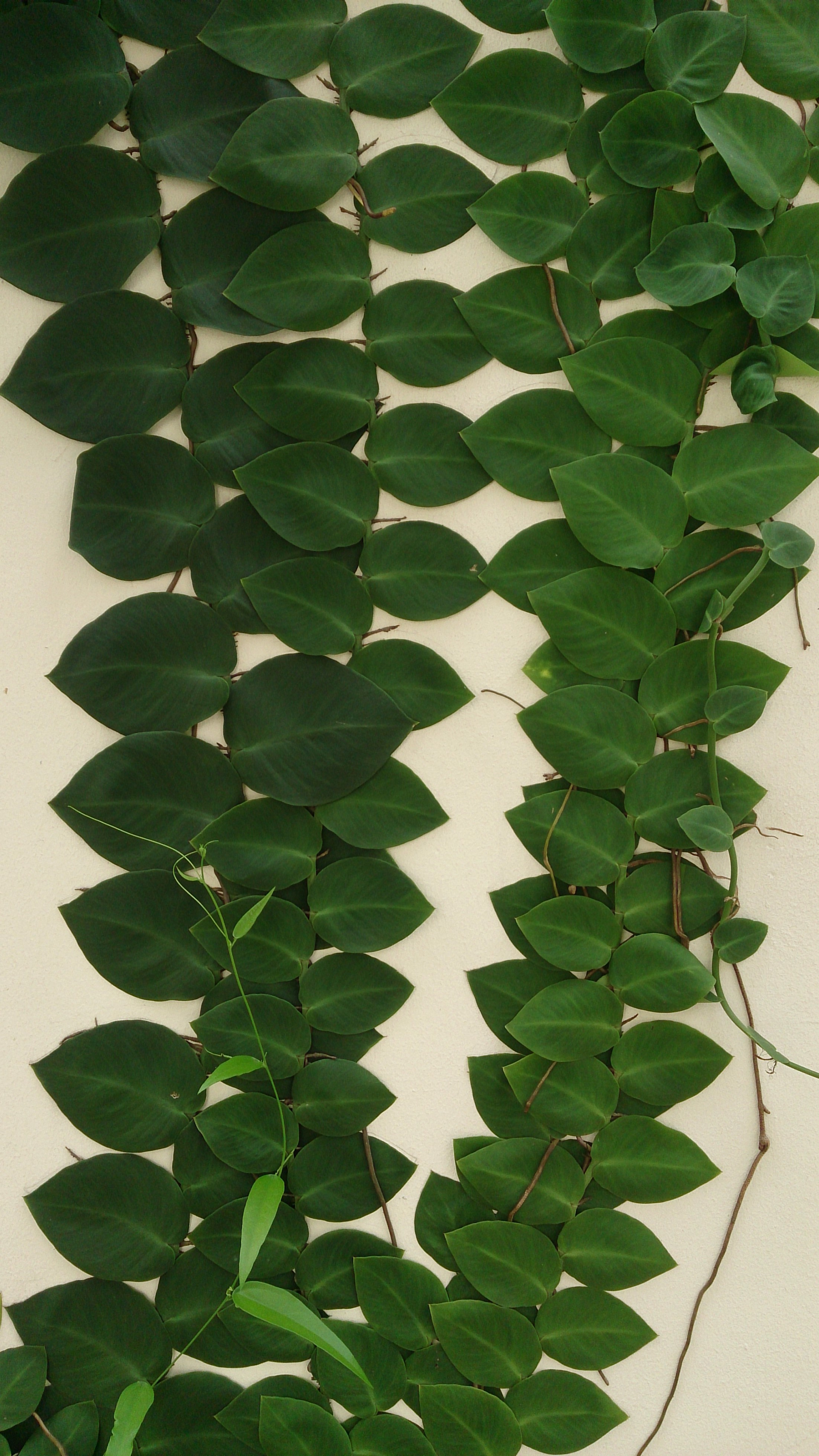

Scientific classification
- Kingdom: Plantae
- Clade: Tracheophytes
- Clade: Angiosperms
- Clade: Monocots
- Order: Alismatales
- Family: Araceae
- Genus: Rhaphidophora
- Species: R. korthalsii

Binomial name
- Rhaphidophora korthalsii Schott

Synonyms
- Rhaphidophora celatocaulis (N.E.Br.) Alderw.

= Rhaphidophora korthalsii =

Species of plant

Rhaphidophora korthalsii is a flowering plant of species Rhaphidophora the family Araceae.

== Description ==
=== Stem ===
Rhaphidophora korthalsii is a very large, robust pachycaul, heterophyllous liana to 20 meters in its seedling stage as a non-skototropic, "shingling" juvenile shoot. "Shingling" refers to the orientation of the leaves to match the contours of the substrate. The adult shoot is composed of elongated, "clingy", leafy flowing stems.

=== Inflorescence ===
Solitary or several together, the first inflorescence is subtended by a bract and one or more cataphylls, which degrade into netted fibres following the emergence of inflorescences subtended by one or more cataphylls.

=== Infructescence ===
The infructescences are 14-27 x 3-3.5 cm. When unripe they are a dark green which will ripen into a dull orange colour.

== Distribution ==
Rhaphidophora korthalsii is native to Arunachal Pradesh, South Nansei-shoto, peninsular Thailand to Malesia and the western Pacific region.
