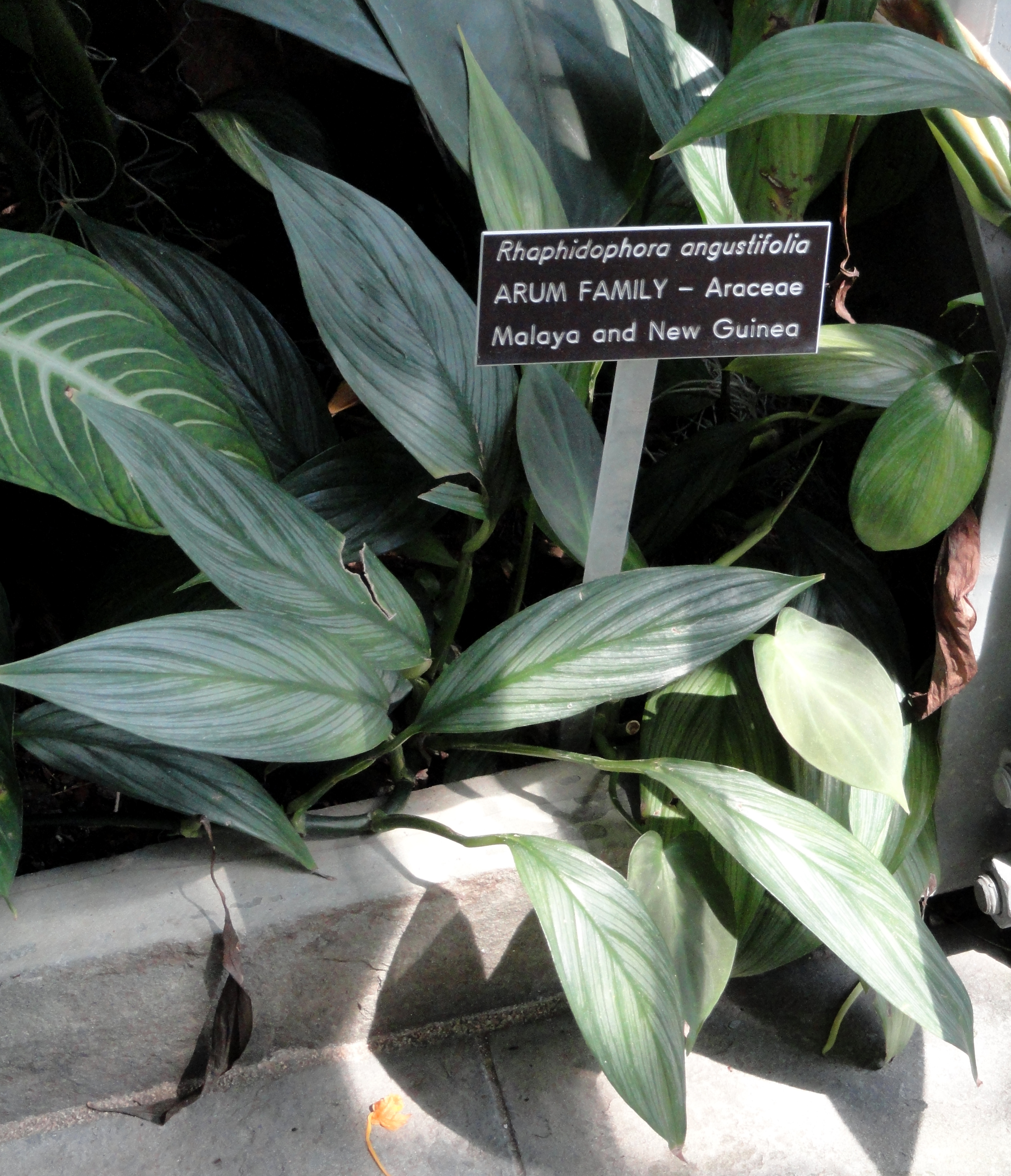

Scientific classification
- Kingdom: Plantae
- Clade: Tracheophytes
- Clade: Angiosperms
- Clade: Monocots
- Order: Alismatales
- Family: Araceae
- Genus: Rhaphidophora
- Species: R. sylvestris

Binomial name
- Rhaphidophora sylvestris (Blume) Engl. 1879

= Rhaphidophora sylvestris =

Species of plant

Rhaphidophora sylvestris is a species of Rhaphidophora found in Thailand to Malaysia and New Guinea (Kep. Aru).
