= Rhaphidophora pusilla =

Conservation status
- Vulnerable (IUCN 3.1)

Scientific classification
- Kingdom: Plantae
- Clade: Tracheophytes
- Clade: Angiosperms
- Clade: Monocots
- Order: Alismatales
- Family: Araceae
- Genus: Rhaphidophora
- Species: R. pusilla

Binomial name
- Rhaphidophora pusilla N.E.Br., Bull. Misc. Inform. Kew 1897: 286 (1897)

Species of flowering plant

Rhaphidophora pusilla is a species of plant in the family Araceae. It is found in Cameroon and Gabon. Its natural habitat is subtropical or tropical moist montane forests. It is threatened by habitat loss.

Rhaphidophora pusilla was considered synonymous with Rhaphidophora africana but was accepted as own species by R. Govaerts and D. G. Frodin in 2002. More recent studies tend to synonymize the species again with R. africana.
