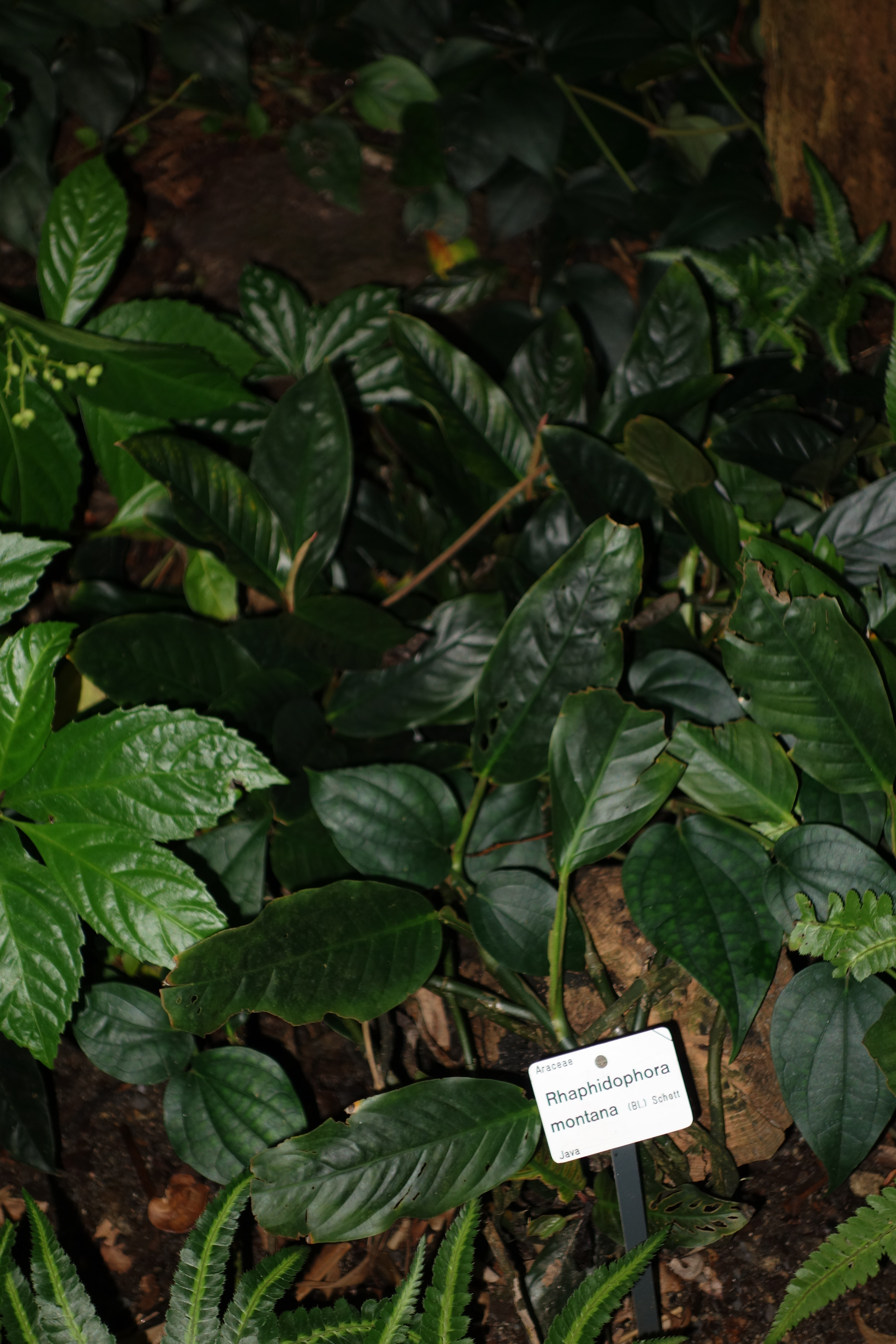

Scientific classification
- Kingdom: Plantae
- Clade: Tracheophytes
- Clade: Angiosperms
- Clade: Monocots
- Order: Alismatales
- Family: Araceae
- Genus: Rhaphidophora
- Species: R. montana

Binomial name
- Rhaphidophora montana (Blume) Schott 1863

= Rhaphidophora montana =

Species of plant

Rhaphidophora montana is a species of Rhaphidophora found in Thailand and Malaysia.
