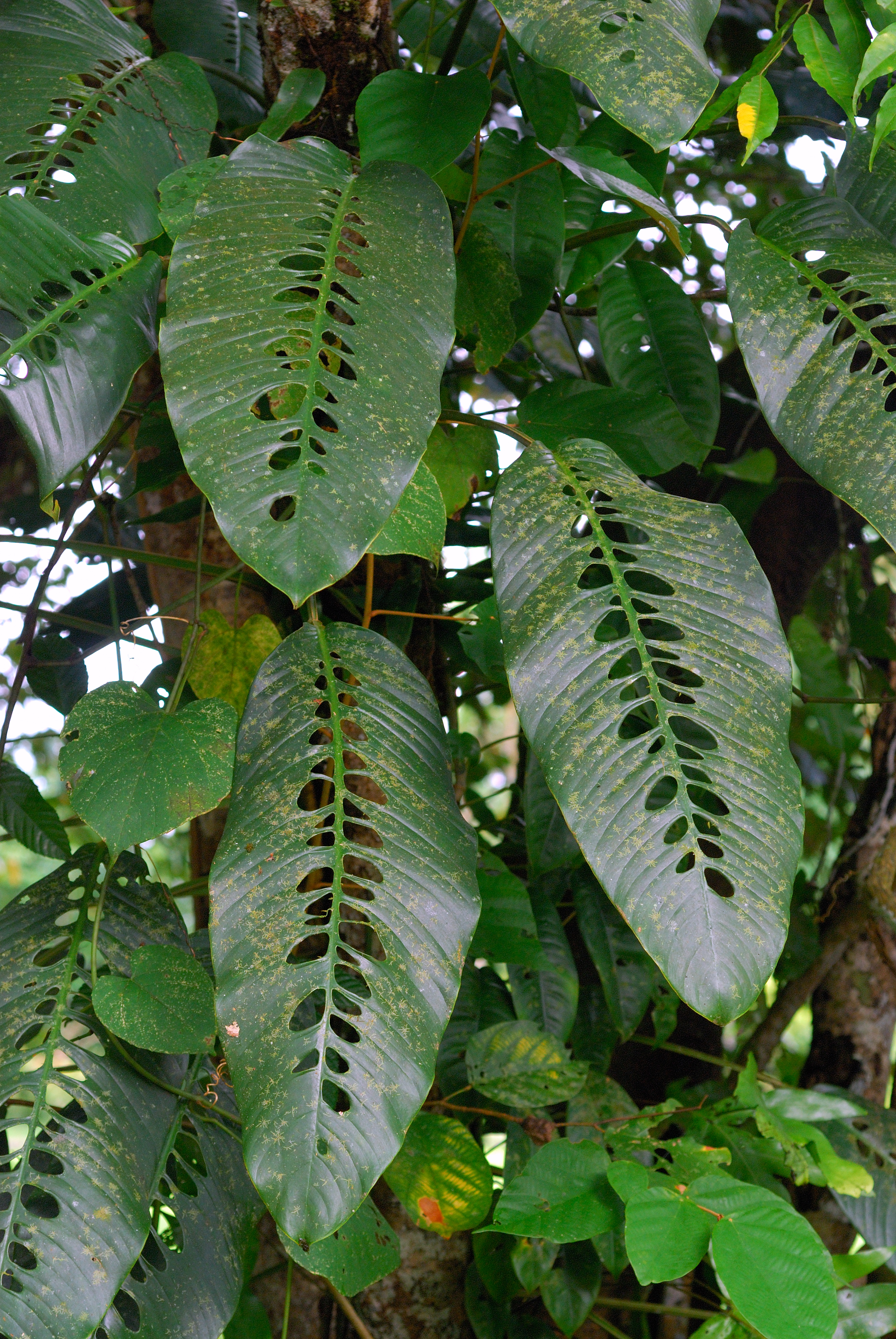

Scientific classification
- Kingdom: Plantae
- Clade: Tracheophytes
- Clade: Angiosperms
- Clade: Monocots
- Order: Alismatales
- Family: Araceae
- Genus: Rhaphidophora
- Species: R. foraminifera

Binomial name
- Rhaphidophora foraminifera (Engl.) Engl.

Synonyms
- Epipremnum foraminiferum Engl.

= Rhaphidophora foraminifera =

Species of flowering plant

Rhaphidophora foraminifera is a species of flowering plant in the family Araceae. It is native to Borneo, Sumatra and Peninsular Malaysia.
