= Piricaudiopsis =

Scientific classification
- Kingdom: Fungi
- Division: Ascomycota
- Class: incertae sedis
- Genus: Piricaudiopsis; J. Mena & Mercado, 1987

Species
- Piricaudiopsis punicae; Piricaudiopsis rhaphidophorae; Piricaudiopsis rosae

Genus of fungi

Piricaudiopsis is a genus of fungus in the phylum Ascomycota. It is considered incertae sedis or of indeterminate placement within the phylum.
