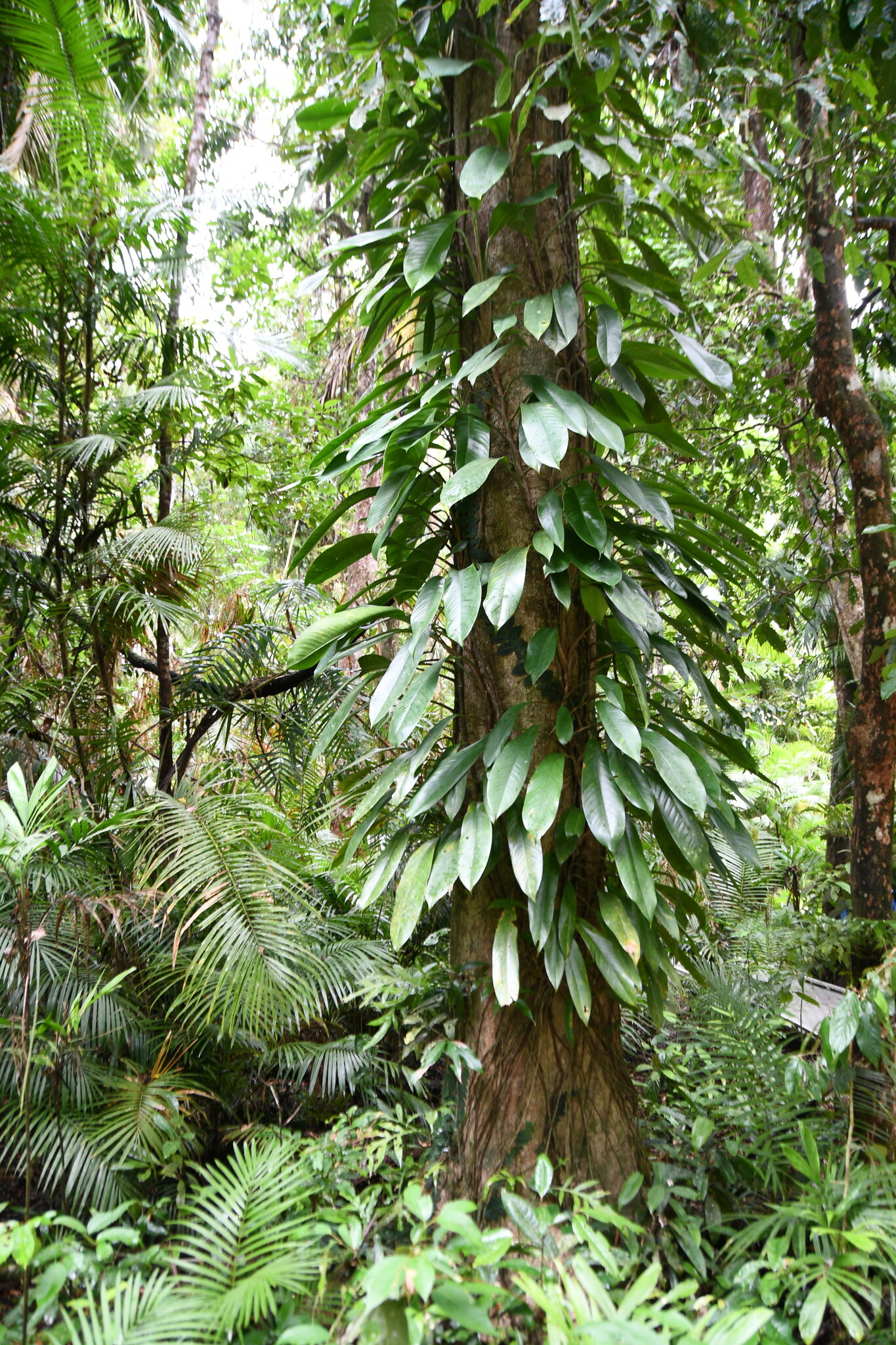
- In rainforest near Cape Tribulation

Conservation status
- Least Concern (NCA)

Scientific classification
- Kingdom: Plantae
- Clade: Tracheophytes
- Clade: Angiosperms
- Clade: Monocots
- Order: Alismatales
- Family: Araceae
- Genus: Rhaphidophora
- Species: R. australasica

Binomial name
- Rhaphidophora australasica F.M.Bailey
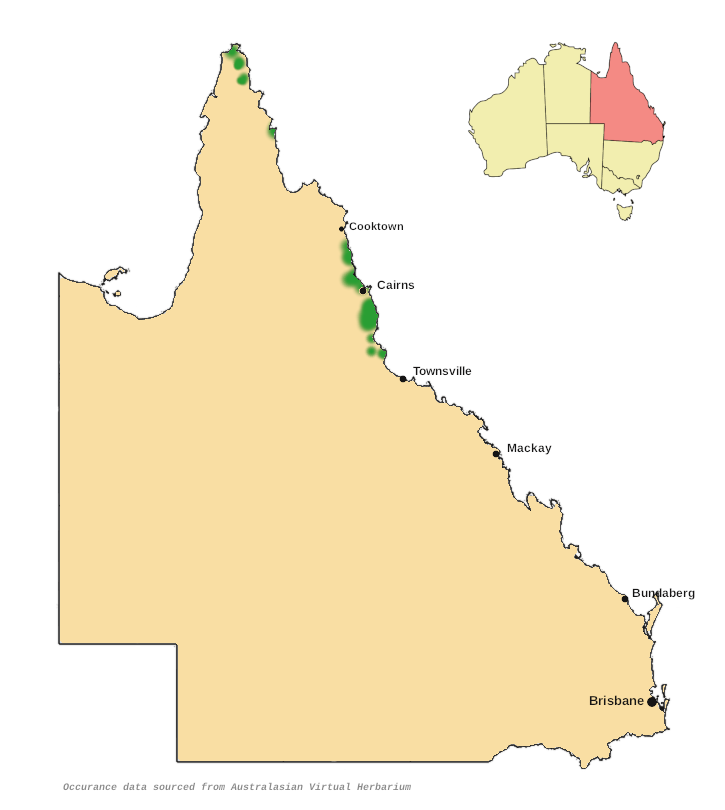

Synonyms
- Rhaphidophora hollrungii Engl. (1889); Rhaphidophora iboensis K.Krause (1912)

= Rhaphidophora australasica =

Needle berry

Species of flowering plant

Rhaphidophora australasica, commonly known as needle berry, is a plant in the arum family Araceae that is only found in the Wet Tropics bioregion of northeastern Queensland, Australia. It is a semi-epiphytic, robust, herbaceous, root climber reaching about 30 m (98 ft) tall. The dark green leaves are oblanceolate to elliptic and measure up to 40 cm (16 in) long by 14 cm (5.5 in) wide. The inflorescence is a spadix about 6–8 cm (2.4–3.1 in) long, enclosed in a spathe about 13 cm (5.1 in) long.

== Taxonomy ==
This species was first described in 1897 by the Australian botanist Frederick Manson Bailey, and published in the Queensland Agricultural Journal.

== Distribution and habitat ==
The needle berry occurs in rainforest from around Cooktown south to about Ingham, at altitudes from sea level to about 1,000 m (3,300 ft).

== Conservation ==
This species is listed by the Queensland Government's Department of Environment, Science and Innovation as least concern. As of 1 April 2024, it has not been assessed by the International Union for Conservation of Nature (IUCN).

== Gallery ==
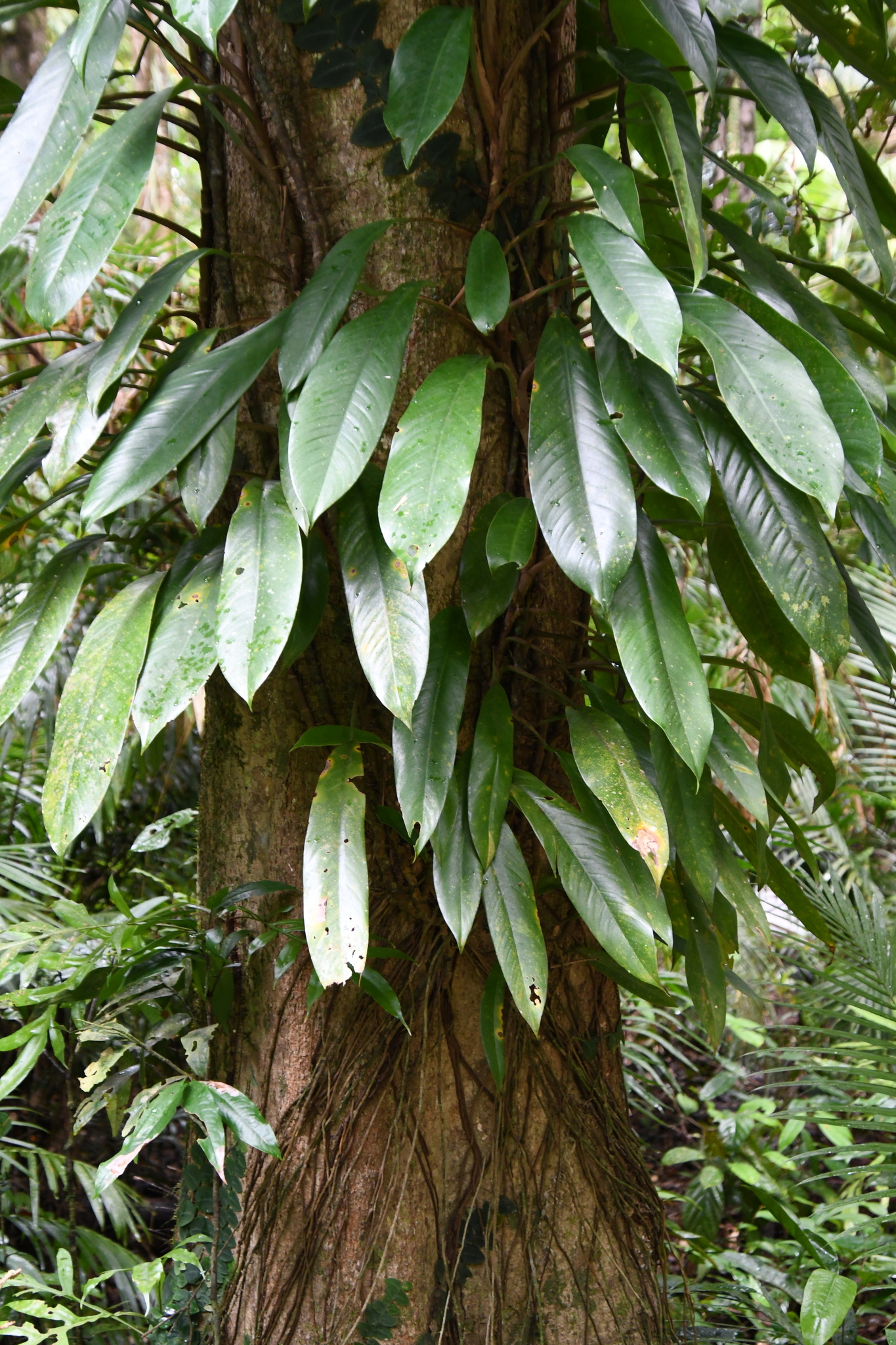
Habit

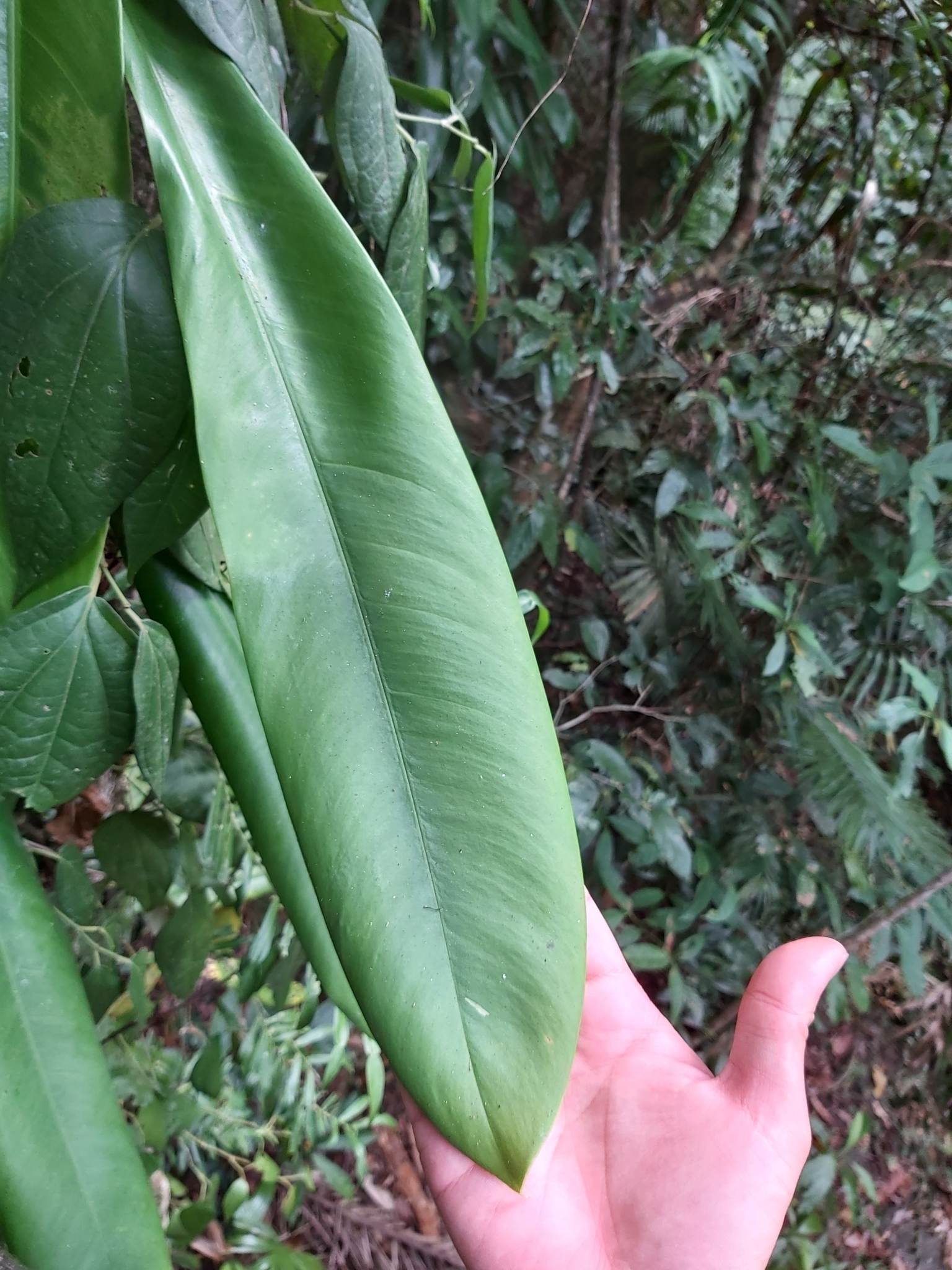
Leaf blade

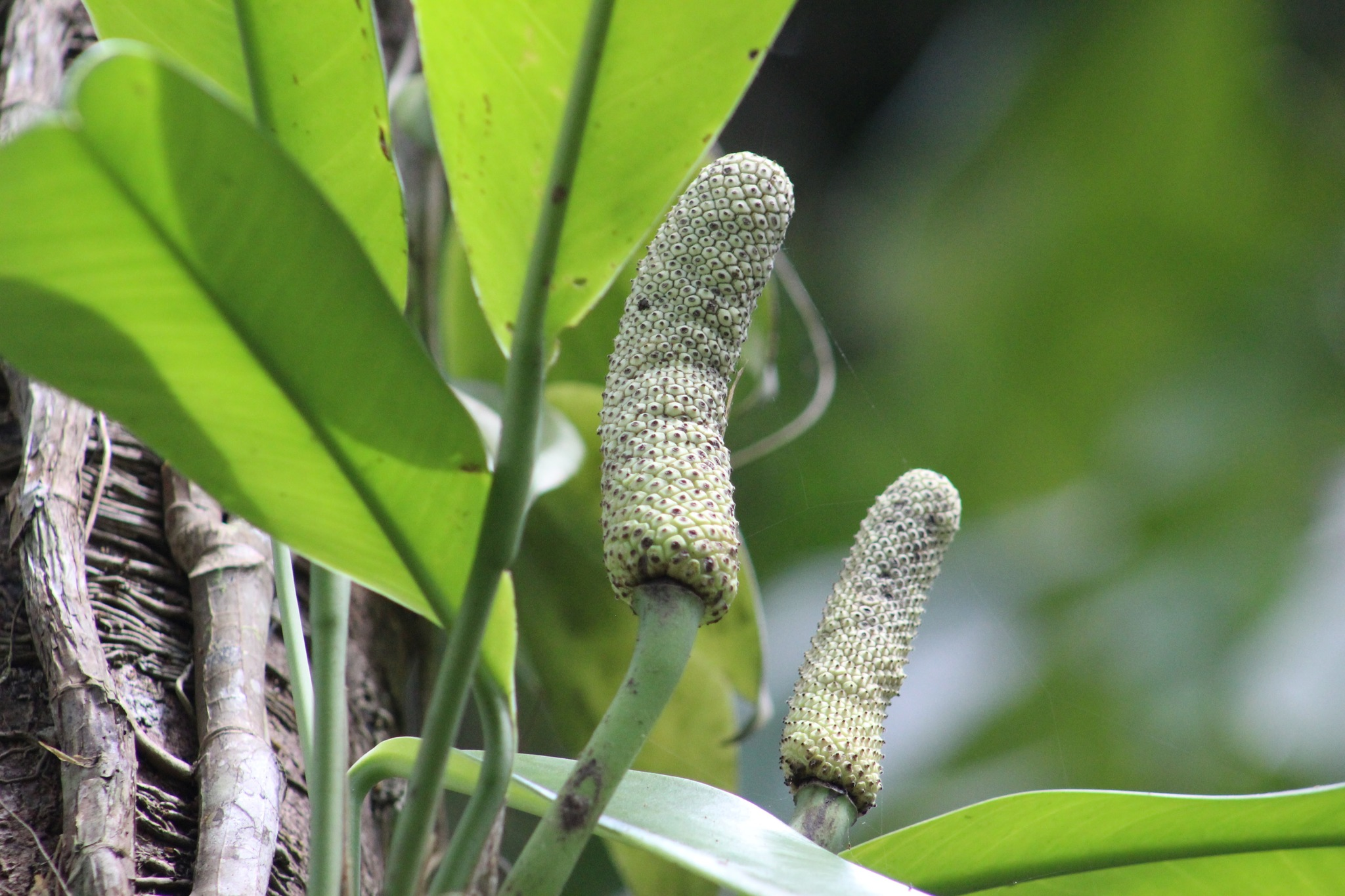
Two spadices (spathes absent)

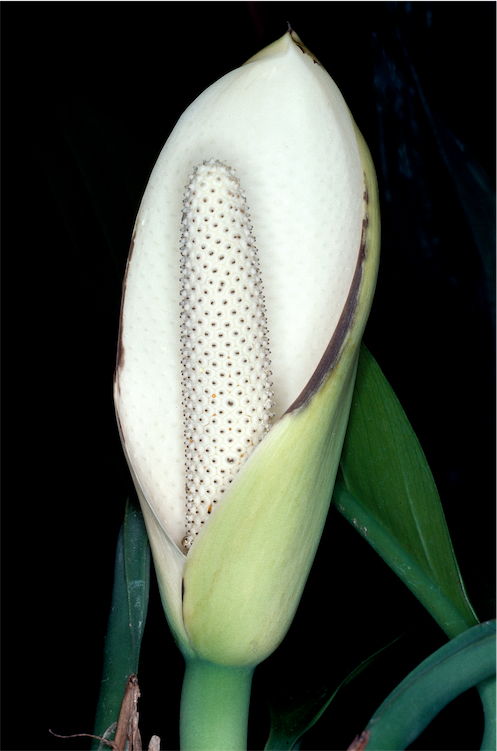
Spadix with spathe
