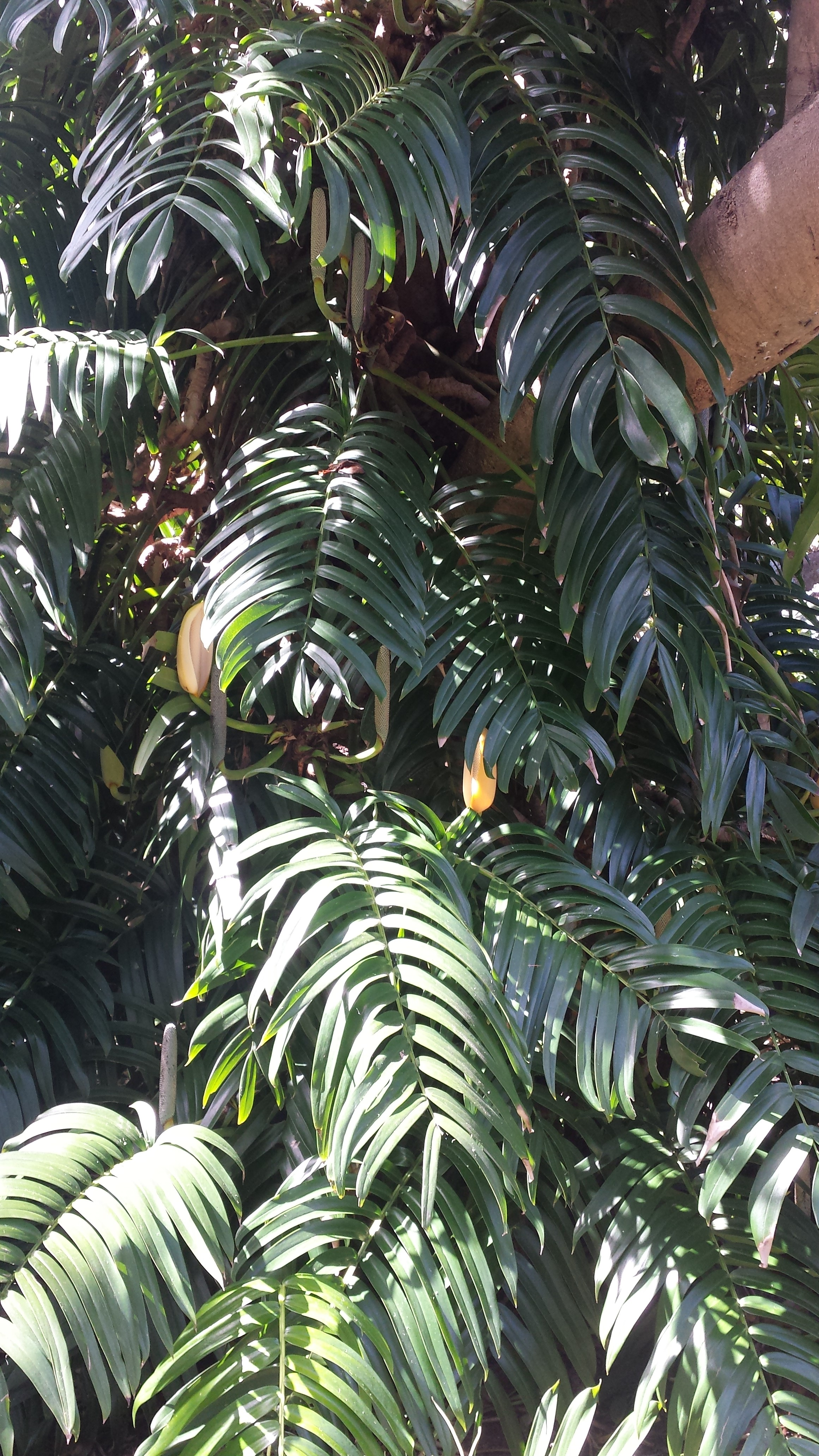
- Rhaphidophora decursiva

Scientific classification
- Kingdom: Plantae
- Clade: Tracheophytes
- Clade: Angiosperms
- Clade: Monocots
- Order: Alismatales
- Family: Araceae
- Genus: Rhaphidophora
- Species: R. decursiva

Binomial name
- Rhaphidophora decursiva (Roxb.) Schott

Synonyms
- Monstera decursiva (Roxb.) Schott; Monstera multijuga K.Koch ex Ender; Pothos decursivus Roxb.; Rhaphidophora affinis Schott; Rhaphidophora eximia Schott; Rhaphidophora grandis Schott; Rhaphidophora insignis Schott; Scindapsus decursivus (Roxb.) Schott

= Rhaphidophora decursiva =

Species of flowering plant

Rhaphidophora decursiva is a species of flowering plant in the family Araceae. It is native to China, the Indian subcontinent, and Indochina.

== Chemistry ==
Six compounds extracted from the dried leaves and stems of Rhaphidophora decursiva have been shown to possess activity against one malarial parasite, Plasmodium falciparum. Polysyphorin and rhaphidecurperoxin showed the strongest antimalarial activity, while rhaphidecursinol A, rhaphidecursinol B, grandisin, and epigrandisin were less active. Rhaphidecursinol A and rhaphidecursinol B were determined to be neolignans, a major class of phytoestrogens, while rhaphidecurperoxin is a new benzoperoxide.

== Gallery ==
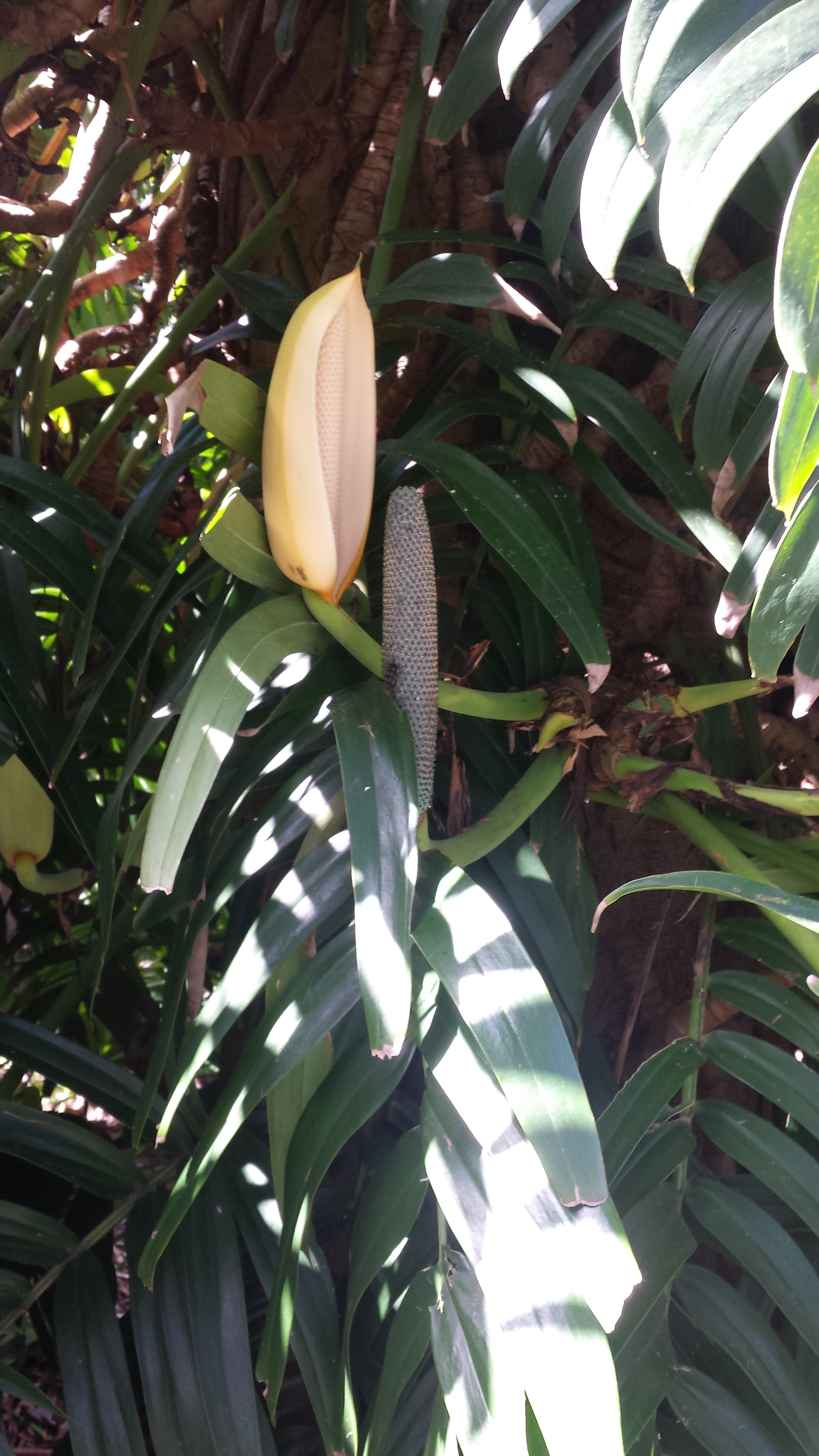

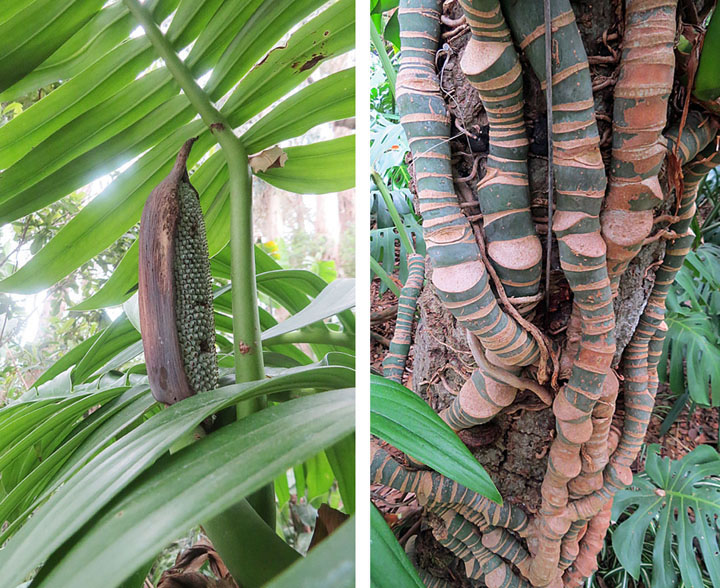
