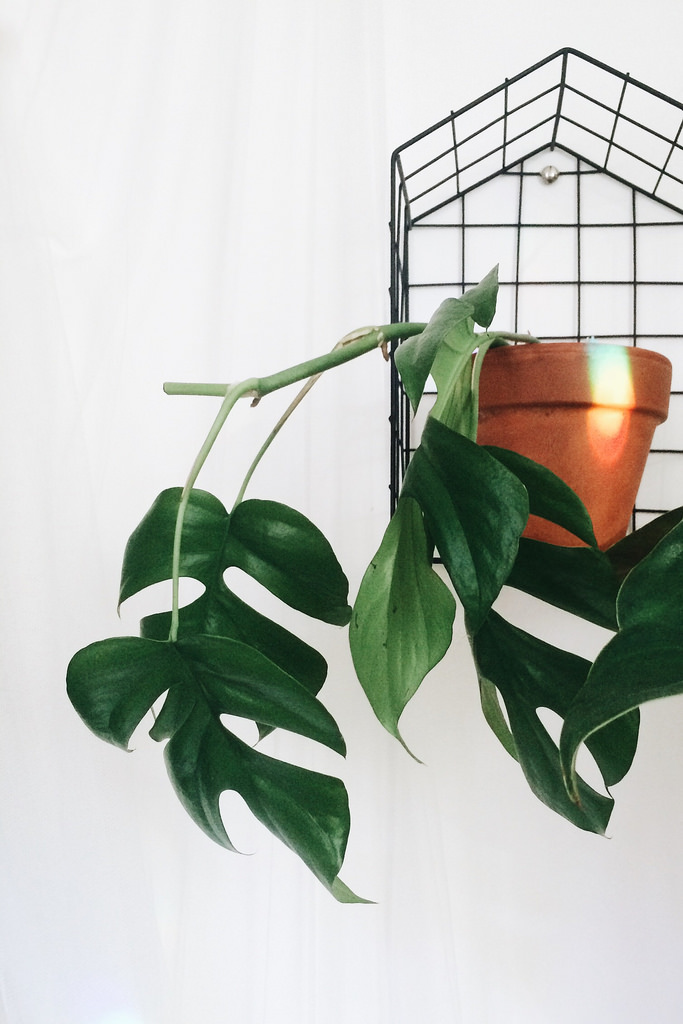
- Rhaphidophora tetrasperma as a houseplant: a cutting from a mature plant, rooting in moist sphagnum moss.

Scientific classification
- Kingdom: Plantae
- Clade: Embryophytes
- Clade: Tracheophytes
- Clade: Angiosperms
- Clade: Monocots
- Order: Alismatales
- Family: Araceae
- Genus: Rhaphidophora
- Species: R. tetrasperma

Binomial name
- Rhaphidophora tetrasperma Hook.f.

= Rhaphidophora tetrasperma =

Species of flowering plant

Rhaphidophora tetrasperma, the mini monstera, is a species of flowering plant in the family Araceae, genus Rhaphidophora. It is native to Southern Thailand and to Malaysia.

This aroid has often been mipinnate foliage, depending on the individual plant's stage of life.

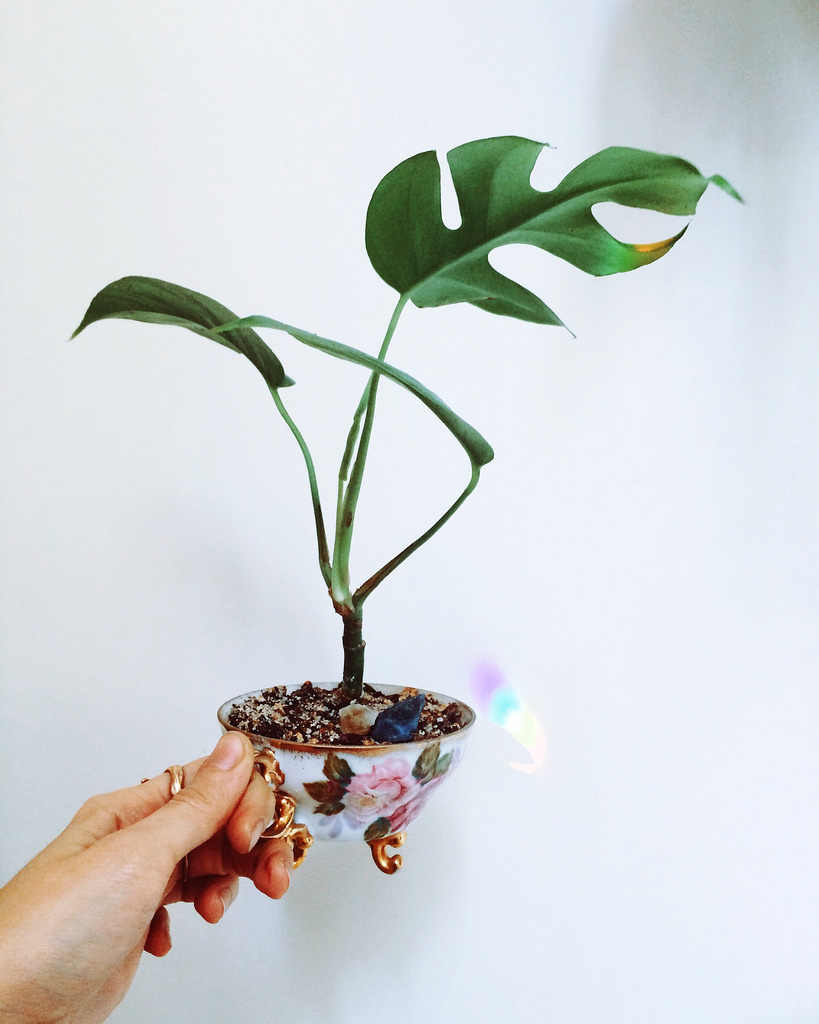
A young R. tetrasperma growing in a tea cup planter with drainage. Leaves of younger plants may not yet form the fenestrations that distinguish this species, especially if not given enough bright, indirect light.

== Taxonomy and etymology ==
The name tetrasperma means four-seeded.

== Trivia ==
On June 13, 2021, a single variegated Rhaphidophora tetrasperma was sold in an internet auction on "Trade me" in New Zealand for a record NZ$27,100 (approximately US$19,300.)
