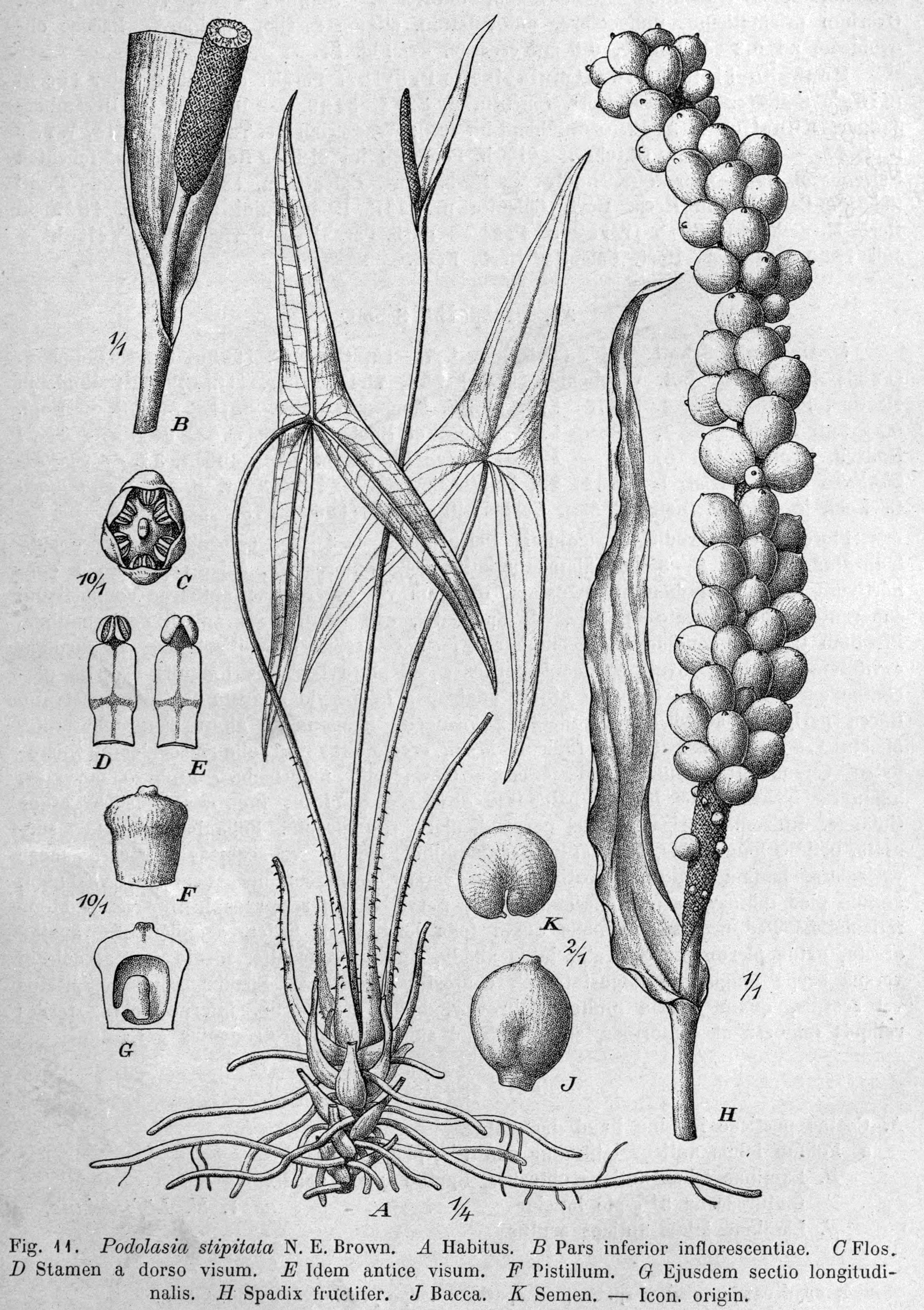
- Podolasia stipitata

Scientific classification
- Kingdom: Plantae
- Clade: Tracheophytes
- Clade: Angiosperms
- Clade: Monocots
- Order: Alismatales
- Family: Araceae
- Subfamily: Lasioideae
- Genus: Podolasia; N.E.Br.
- Species: P. stipitata

Binomial name
- Podolasia stipitata N.E.Br.

Synonyms
- Lasia stipitata N.E.Br.; Cyrtosperma angustilobum Engl.

= Podolasia =

Genus of flowering plants

Podolasia is a monotypic genus of flowering plants in the family Araceae. The single known species in the genus is Podolasia stipitata. It is native to Borneo, Sumatra, and Peninsular Malaysia.

Podolasia stipitata has vegetative features that are similar to the genus Lasia and has floral features similar to the genus Cyrtosperma. It has leathery leaves that can vary from being hastate to sagittate (arrow-shaped). The inflorescence is white when first produced but begin to turn purple from the top down as male anthesis begins. The fruit produced is large and red.
