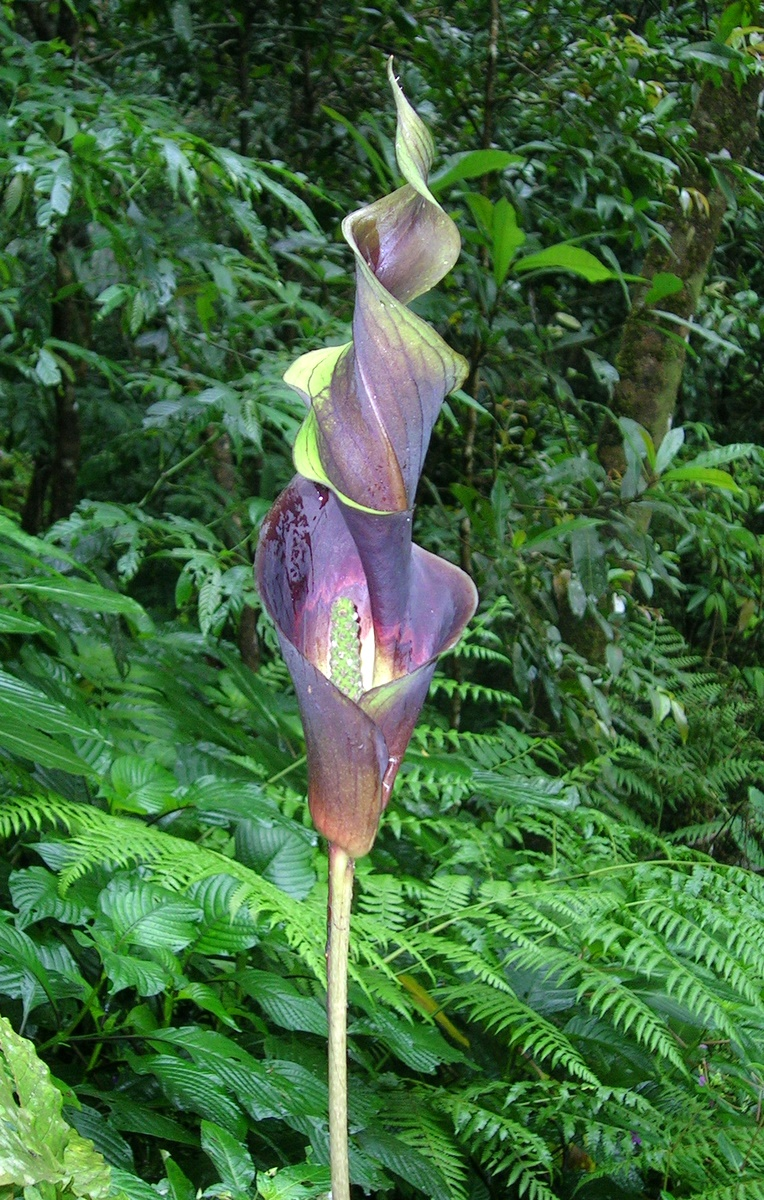
- Anaphyllum wightii

Scientific classification
- Kingdom: Plantae
- Clade: Tracheophytes
- Clade: Angiosperms
- Clade: Monocots
- Order: Alismatales
- Family: Araceae
- Subfamily: Lasioideae; Engl.

= Lasioideae =

Subfamily of flowering plants

Lasioideae is a subfamily of flowering plants in the family Araceae. It contains ten living genera: Anaphyllopsis, Anaphyllum, Cyrtosperma, Dracontioides, Dracontium, Lasia, Lasimorpha, Podolasia, Pycnospatha, and Urospatha. The subfamily also includes the extinct genus Keratospema described from Ypresian fossils recovered at the Eocene Okanagan Highlands Princeton Chert site.
