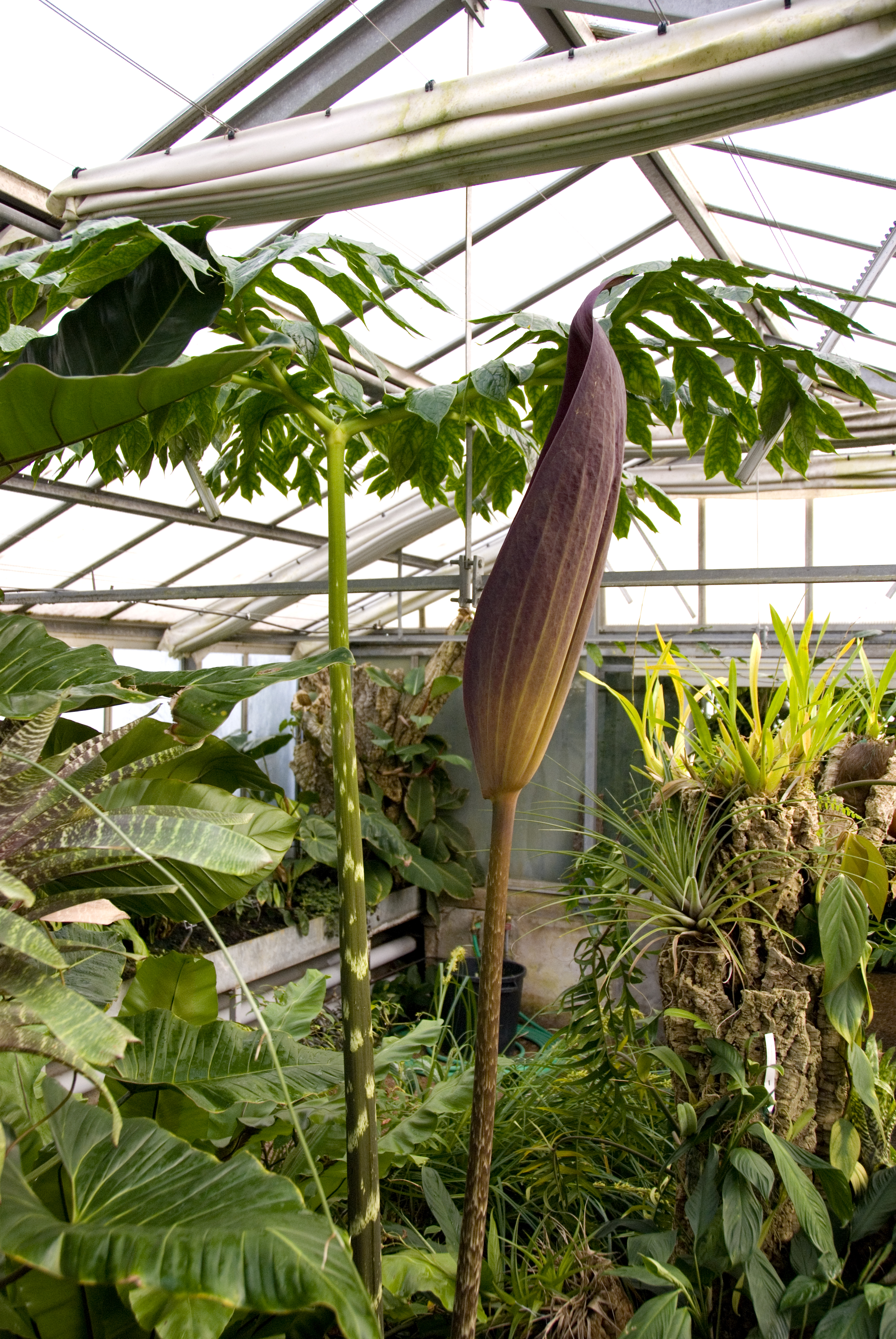

Scientific classification
- Kingdom: Plantae
- Clade: Embryophytes
- Clade: Tracheophytes
- Clade: Angiosperms
- Clade: Monocots
- Order: Alismatales
- Family: Araceae
- Genus: Dracontium
- Species: D. pittieri

Binomial name
- Dracontium pittieri Engl.

= Dracontium pittieri =

Species of flowering plant

Dracontium pittieri is a species of flowering plant native to Costa Rica. It is similar in appearance to Dracontium gigas, but has a substantially longer peduncle, which is the longest of any plant in its genus, between five and eight times the length of its spathe.
