= Anaphyllopsis =

Scientific classification
- Kingdom: Plantae
- Clade: Embryophytes
- Clade: Tracheophytes
- Clade: Spermatophytes
- Clade: Angiosperms
- Clade: Monocots
- Order: Alismatales
- Family: Araceae
- Subfamily: Lasioideae
- Genus: Anaphyllopsis; A.Hay

Genus of flowering plants

Anaphyllopsis is a genus of flowering plants in the family Araceae, native to northern South America.

The genus was created in 1988 by Hay in order to account for the differences of Cyrtosperma americanum from other Cyrtosperma species. The decision was to create a genus named Anaphyllopsis and rename Cyrtosperma americanum as Anaphyllopsis americanum. Two other species from the Amazon were subsequently added, Anaphyllopsis pinnata and Anaphyllopsis cururuana. The leaves of Anaphyllopsis are characteristic of being pinnate. Anaphyllopsis is quite similar in appearance to the genus Anaphyllum.

== Species ==
- Anaphyllopsis americanum (Engl.) A.Hay - northern Brazil, Guyana, French Guiana
- Anaphyllopsis cururuana A.Hay - northern Brazil
- Anaphyllopsis pinnata A.Hay - Amazonas State in southern Venezuela
