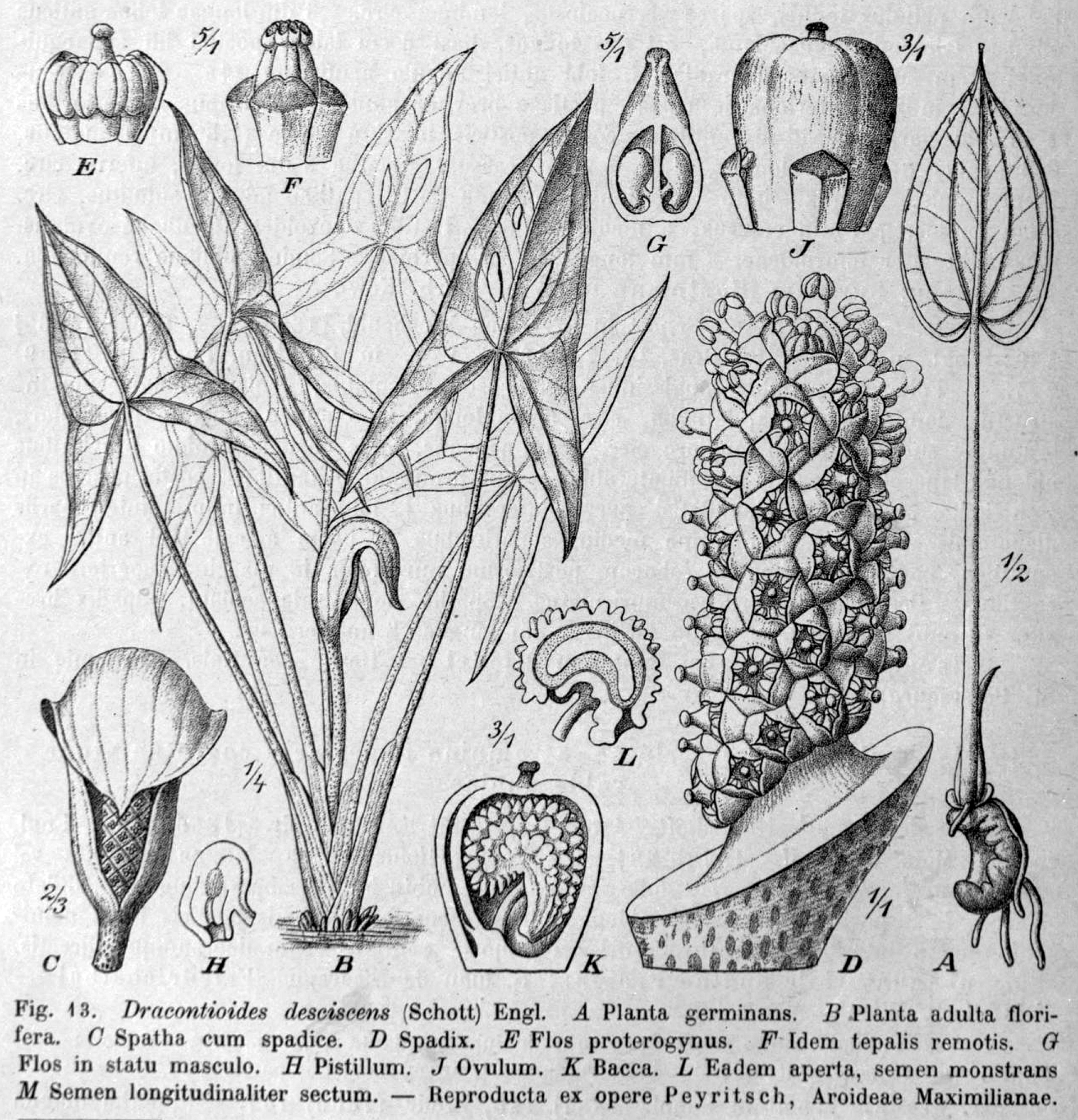
- Dracontioides desciscens 1911 illustration

Scientific classification
- Kingdom: Plantae
- Clade: Tracheophytes
- Clade: Angiosperms
- Clade: Monocots
- Order: Alismatales
- Family: Araceae
- Genus: Dracontioides
- Species: D. desciscens

Binomial name
- Dracontioides desciscens (Schott) Engl.

Synonyms
- Urospatha desciscens Schott

= Dracontioides desciscens =

Species of flowering plant

Dracontioides desciscens is a plant species in the family Araceae. It is endemic to eastern Brazil (States of Pernambuco, Bahia, Espírito Santo).
