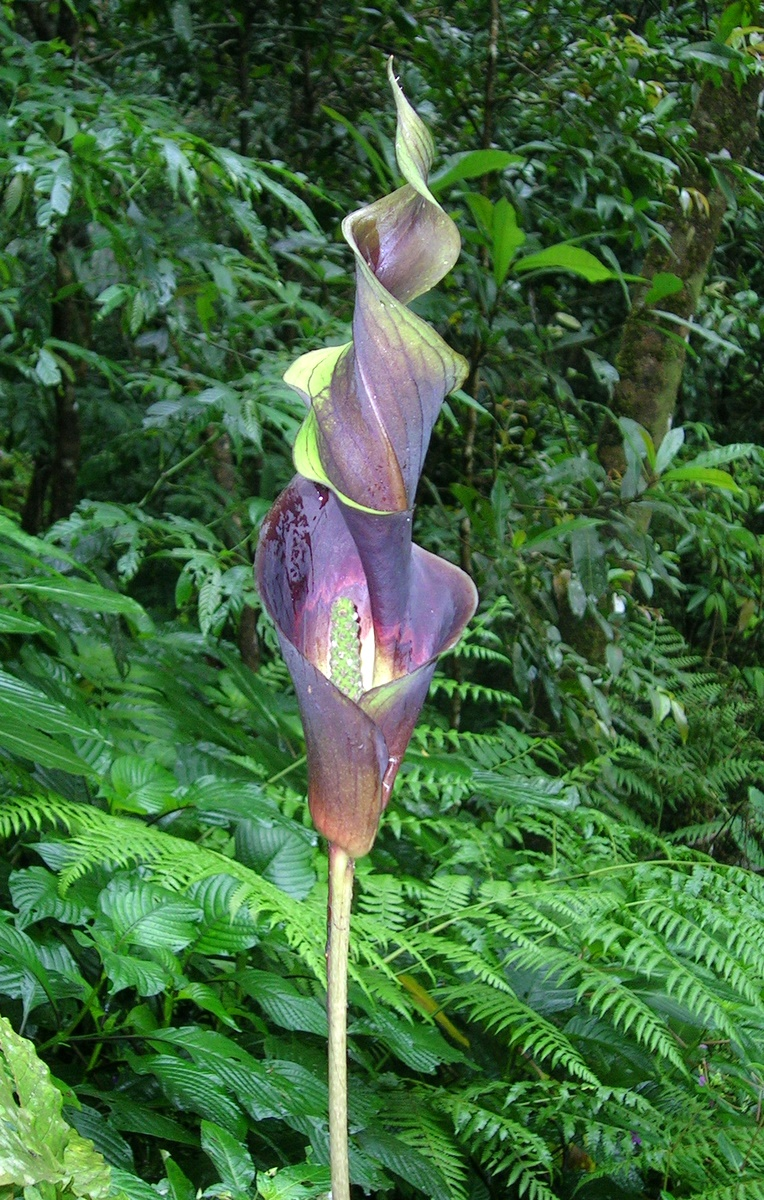
- Anaphyllum wightii

Scientific classification
- Kingdom: Plantae
- Clade: Tracheophytes
- Clade: Angiosperms
- Clade: Monocots
- Order: Alismatales
- Family: Araceae
- Subfamily: Lasioideae
- Genus: Anaphyllum; Schott

= Anaphyllum =

Genus of flowering plants

Anaphyllum is a genus of flowering plants in the family Araceae. It consists of two species. They are found in marshes, have leaves with some pinnation, and have a twisted spathe. The two species in this genus are similar in appearance to those in the genus Anaphyllopsis.

- Anaphyllum beddomei Engl. - Tamil Nadu, Lakshadweep (Laccadive Islands)
- Anaphyllum wightii Schott. - Kerala, Lakshadweep (Laccadive Islands)
