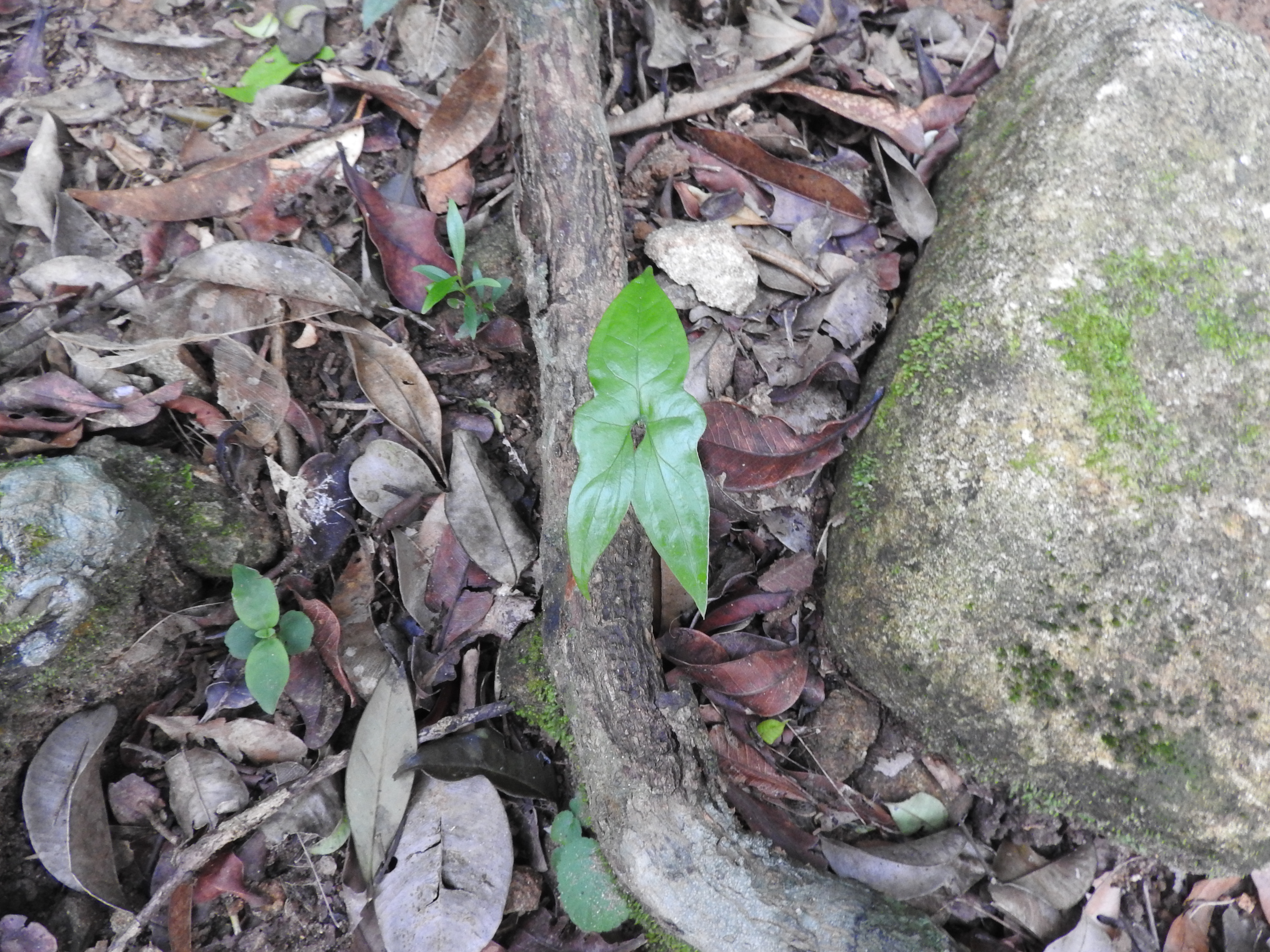

Scientific classification
- Kingdom: Plantae
- Clade: Tracheophytes
- Clade: Angiosperms
- Clade: Monocots
- Order: Alismatales
- Family: Araceae
- Genus: Anaphyllum
- Species: A. beddomei

Binomial name
- Anaphyllum beddomei Engl.

= Anaphyllum beddomei =

Genus of flowering plants

Anaphyllum beddomei is a species of flowering plant in the family Araceae.

== Distribution ==
It is distributed in Laccadive Islands, Kerala and Tamilnadu.

== Description ==
Herbaceous plants with leaves bearing a long petiole and a broad, expanded blade. The inflorescence consists of a somewhat petaloid spathe enclosing a spadix that bears numerous densely packed, sessile, ebracteate flowers. The spadix is cylindrical, shorter than the spathe, and lacks any terminal appendage.

== Uses ==
The Kani tribe of South Kerala use Anaphyllum beddomei as an anti-venom medicinal plant for treating snake bites. Parts of the plant such as roots, leaves, tubers, or the whole plant are utilized in their traditional herbal remedies.
