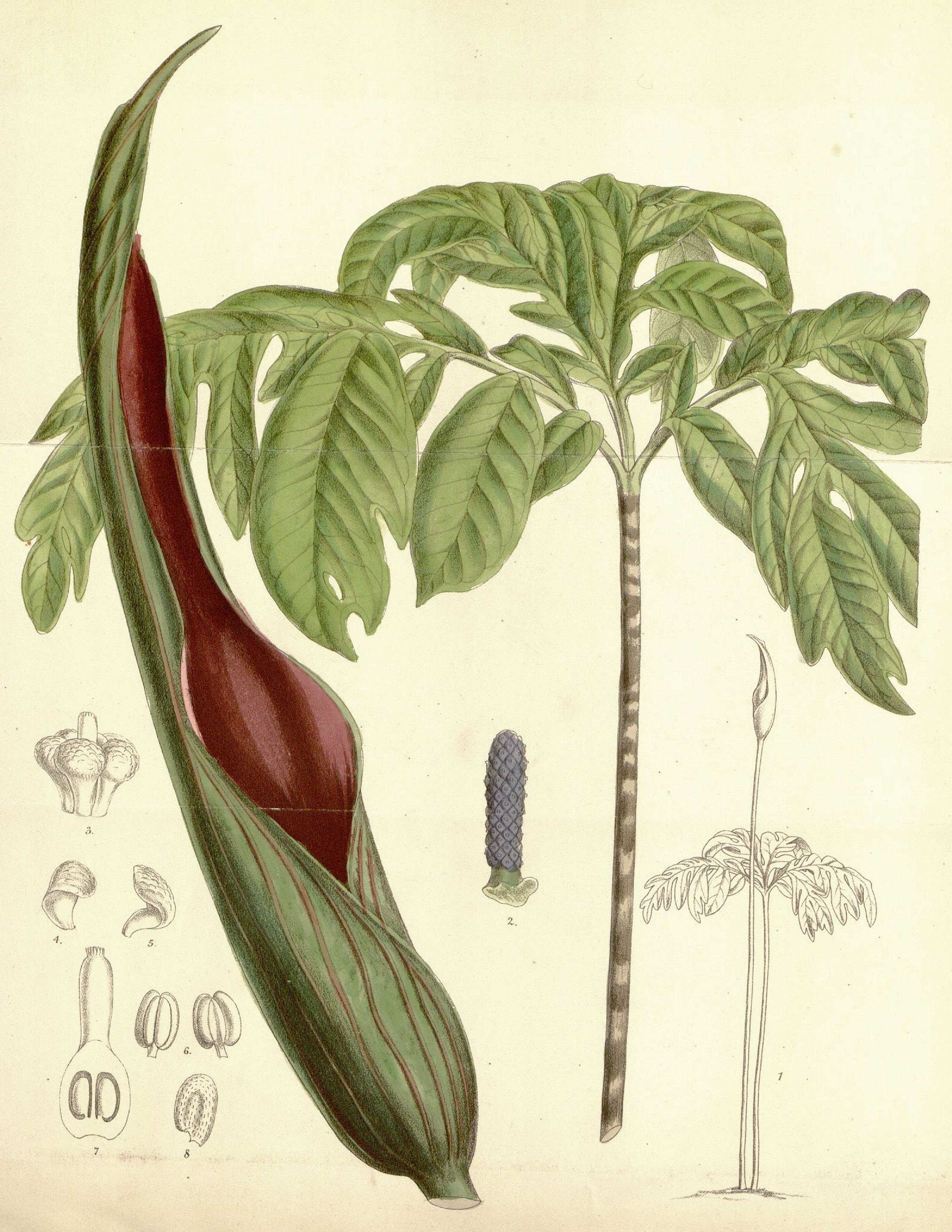
- 1880 Botanical illustration of Dracontium spruceanum

Scientific classification
- Kingdom: Plantae
- Clade: Tracheophytes
- Clade: Angiosperms
- Clade: Monocots
- Order: Alismatales
- Family: Araceae
- Genus: Dracontium
- Species: D. spruceanum

Binomial name
- Dracontium spruceanum (Schott) G.H.Zhu 1996

Synonyms
- Cyrtosperma spruceanum (Schott) Engl.; Dracontium carderi Hook.f.; Dracontium costaricense Engl.; Dracontium loretense K.Krause; Dracontium ornatum K.Krause; Dracontium trianae Engl.; Echidnium spruceanum Schott

= Dracontium spruceanum =

Species of flowering plant

Dracontium spruceanum is a tropical, succulent flowering plant species of the Amazon rainforest understory. It has been found in the South American countries of Colombia, Ecuador, Peru, Suriname, and Venezuela, as well as in the Central American countries of Costa Rica and Panama.

Common names for Dracontium sp. include jergón sacha (or sacha jergon), fer-de-lance, hierba del jergon, erva-jararaca, jararaca, jararaca-taia, milho-de-cobra, and taja-de-cobra.

Guang Hua Zhu identified two varieties of the species, apart from the typical variety: Dracontium spruceanum var. asperispathum and Dracontium spruceanum var. grandispathum.
