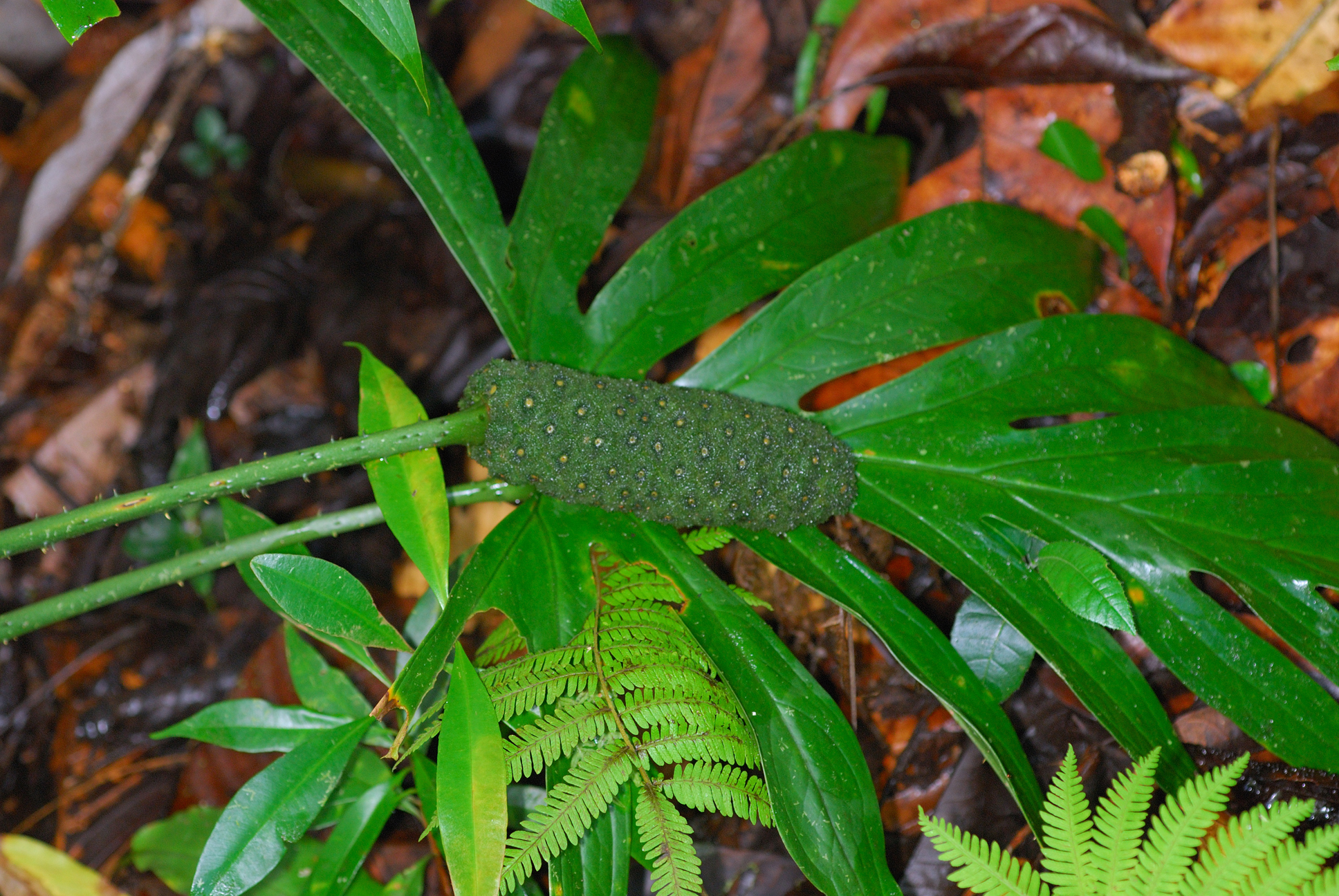
- Lasia spinosa

Scientific classification
- Kingdom: Plantae
- Clade: Tracheophytes
- Clade: Angiosperms
- Clade: Monocots
- Order: Alismatales
- Family: Araceae
- Subfamily: Lasioideae
- Genus: Lasia; Lour.

Synonyms
- Lasius Hassk.

= Lasia =

Genus of flowering plants

Lasia is a genus of flowering plants in the family Araceae, native to Asia and New Guinea. The genus contains only two known species, Lasia spinosa and Lasia concinna. Lasia was believed to be a monotypic genus until 1997 when a wild population of Lasia concinna was discovered in a farmer's paddy field in West Kalimantan, Indonesia. The farmer had been growing them for their edible young leaves. This species of Lasia had been known of previously only from a single specimen at the Bogor Botanic Gardens, formally described in 1920. Prior to 1997, the specimen was believed to have been a hybrid between Lasia spinosa and Cyrtosperma merkusii. The subsequent discovery by Hambali and Sizemore led to the realization that it was in fact a distinct species.

== Species ==
- Lasia concinna Alderw. – West Kalimantan (Borneo)
- Lasia spinosa (L.) Thwaites – China (including Tibet), Taiwan, Indian Subcontinent, Indochina, Malaysia, Indonesia, New Guinea

== Uses ==
In Sri Lanka, Lasia spinosa is known as kohila (කොහිල) and the leaves and rhizomes of the plant are used in Sri Lankan cuisine.

Leaf extract of Lasia spinosa has shown significant anthelminthic efficacy against the adult stages and migrating larvae of Trichinella spiralis. doi:10.1007/s00436-011-2551-9.

== Myanmar ==
In Myanmar, Lasia plant is known as Zayit (in Myanmar ဇရစ်). Its shoots are used in cuisines either as fried cuisine or soup.
