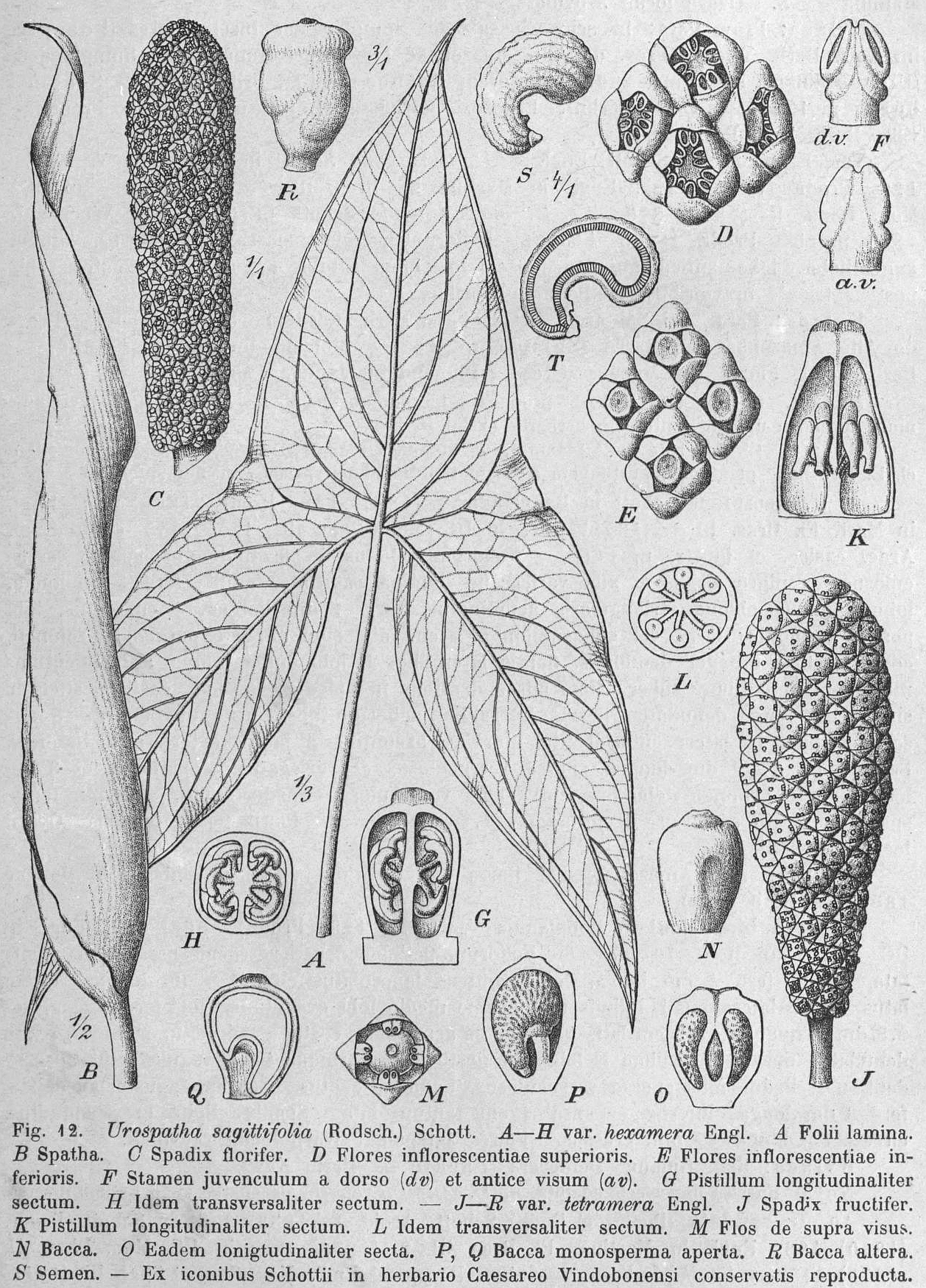
- Urospatha sagittifolia

Scientific classification
- Kingdom: Plantae
- Clade: Tracheophytes
- Clade: Angiosperms
- Clade: Monocots
- Order: Alismatales
- Family: Araceae
- Subfamily: Lasioideae
- Genus: Urospatha; Schott

Synonyms
- Urophyllum K.Koch 1857, illegitimate homonym, not Jack ex Wall. 1824; Urospathella G.S.Bunting

= Urospatha =

Genus of flowering plants

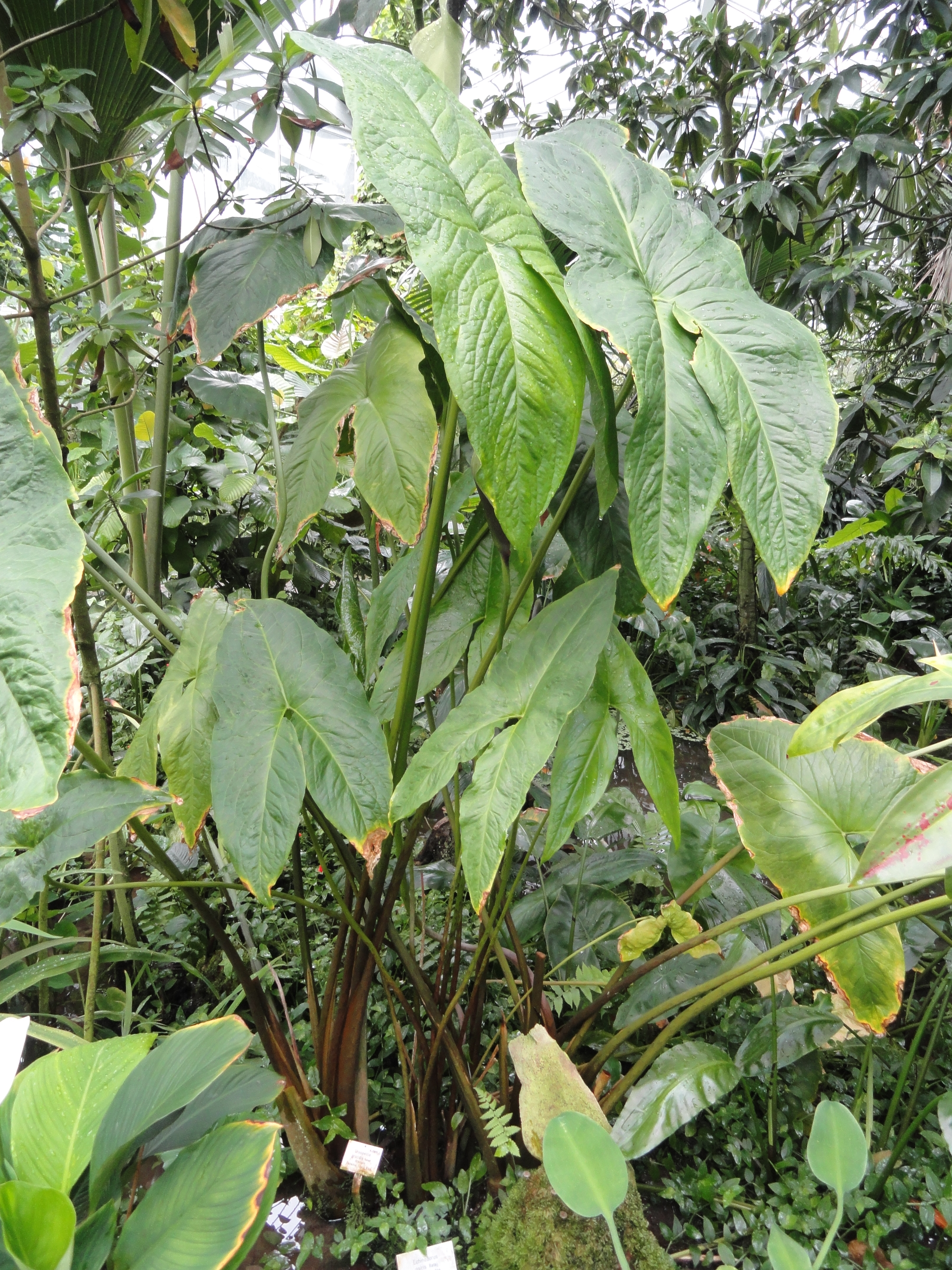
Urospatha grandis habit

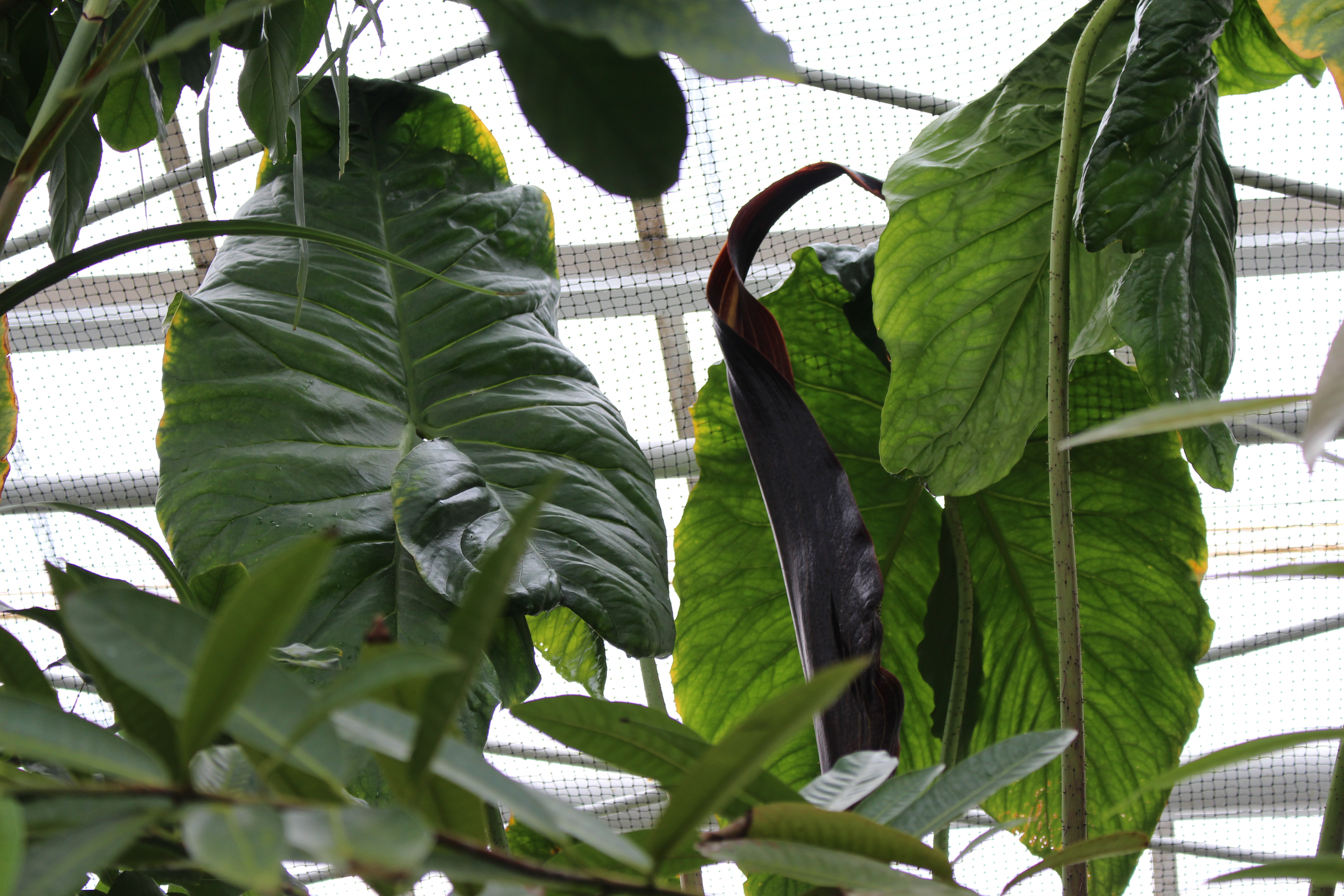
Upper spathe and leaves of Urospatha sagittifolia

Urospatha is a genus of flowering plants in the family Araceae that consists of 11 known species. They are found growing in South America and Central America in swamps, wet savannahs, and brackish water. The leaves of the species in this genus are upward pointing and sagittate (arrow-shaped). The inflorescences are quite unique; the spathe is mottled and elongated with a spiral twist at the end. The seeds are distributed by water and have a texture similar to cork that allows them to float. They also quickly germinate in water.

== Selected species ==
- Urospatha angustiloba Engl. - northwestern Brazil
- Urospatha antisylleptica R.E.Schult. - Colombia
- Urospatha caudata (Poepp.) Schott - Peru, northwestern Brazil
- Urospatha edwallii Engl. - southeastern Brazil
- Urospatha friedrichsthalii Schott - Costa Rica, Guatemala, Nicaragua, Panama
- Urospatha loefgreniana Engl. - central + southern Brazil
- Urospatha meyeri Schott - Suriname
- Urospatha riedeliana Schott - northeastern Brazil
- Urospatha sagittifolia (Rudge) Schott - Brazil, Paraguay, Bolivia, Peru, Ecuador, Colombia, Venezuela, the Guianas
- Urospatha somnolenta R.E.Schult. - Colombia
- Urospatha wurdackii (G.S.Bunting) A.Hay - Colombia, Venezuela
