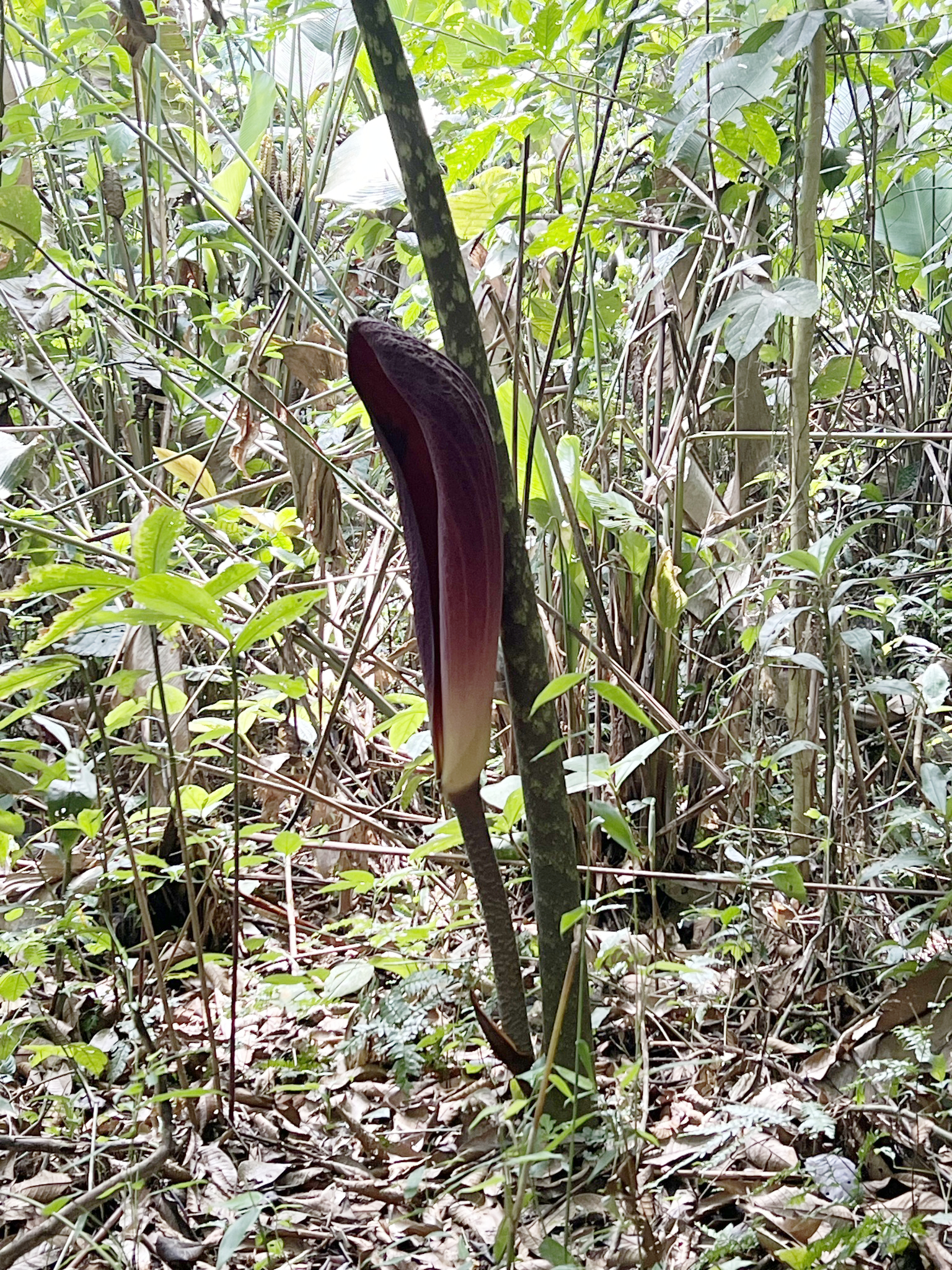
- Dracontium gigas in Sarapiquí, Costa Rica

Scientific classification
- Kingdom: Plantae
- Clade: Tracheophytes
- Clade: Angiosperms
- Clade: Monocots
- Order: Alismatales
- Family: Araceae
- Genus: Dracontium
- Species: D. gigas

Binomial name
- Dracontium gigas (Seem.) Engl.

Synonyms
- Godwinia gigas Seem.

= Dracontium gigas =

Species of flowering plant

Dracontium gigas (syn. Godwinia gigas) is a herbaceous rainforest plant in the family Araceae, native to Costa Rica and Nicaragua. It resembles the Old World species Amorphophallus titanum but has a spadix that is shorter than the spathe, and an inflorescence that reaches up to 85 cm (33 in) in height; the inflorescence gives off a disgusting carrion-like smell. The leaf can grow up to 3.5 m (11 ft) high (the record is 4.3 m (14 ft)) and 2.5 m (8 ft 2 in) wide. While the petiole of A. titanum can be 30 cm (12 in) or more thick, that of D. gigas is only 5–9.5 cm thick.

This species was discovered in 1869 by Berthold Seemann, in the mountains of the Chontales Department of Nicaragua. It can also be found in Trinidad and Tobago.
