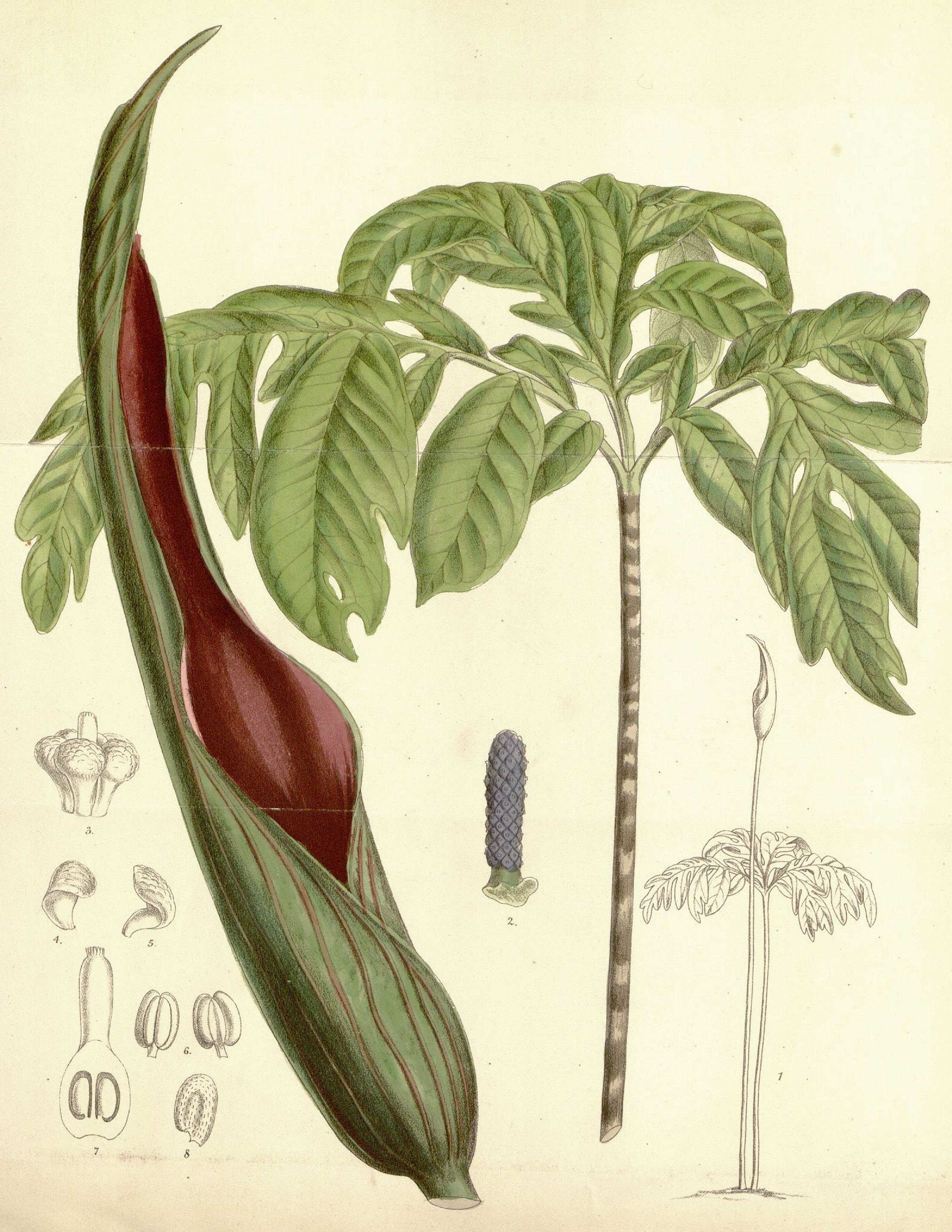
- 1880 Botanical illustration of Dracontium spruceanum

Scientific classification
- Kingdom: Plantae
- Clade: Tracheophytes
- Clade: Angiosperms
- Clade: Monocots
- Order: Alismatales
- Family: Araceae
- Subfamily: Lasioideae
- Genus: Dracontium; Blume ex Decne.

Species
- See text

Synonyms
- Eutereia Raf.; Echidnium Schott; Ophione Schott; Chersydrium Schott; Godwinia Seem.

= Dracontium =

Genus of flowering plants

Dracontium is a genus of flowering plants similar to those of Amorphophallus. Unlike Amorphophallus which is found in the Old World, this genus has a New World distribution and is native to South America, Central America, southern Mexico, and the West Indies.

Dracontium species can be distinguished from related genera by their inflorescence, which is smaller and unisexual. The plant has a large caudexlike tuber similar to that of Amorphophallus, but rounder, and with no central and circular scar mark. When Dracontium plants begin to flower, the tuber swells and smoothens.

== Species ==
More than 20 Dracontium species have been described:

- Dracontium amazonense G.H.Zhu & Croat - Venezuela, Peru, northwestern Brazil
- Dracontium angustispathum G.H.Zhu & Croat - Colombia, Peru
- Dracontium asperispathum G.H.Zhu & Croat - Colombia, Peru, Ecuador
- Dracontium asperum K. Koch - Puerto Rico, Dominican Republic, Trinidad, Windward Islands, Venezuela, Peru, northwestern Brazil, the Guianas
- Dracontium bogneri G.H.Zhu & Croat - Brazil
- Dracontium croatii G.H.Zhu - Carchi and Pichincha Provinces in Ecuador
- Dracontium dubium Kunth - Venezuela, Guyana
- Dracontium gigas (Seem.) Engl. - Nicaragua, Costa Rica
- Dracontium grandispathum G.H.Zhu & Croat - Ecuador
- Dracontium grayumianum G.H.Zhu & Croat - Panama, Colombia
- Dracontium guianense G.H.Zhu & Croat - French Guiana
- Dracontium iquitense E.C.Morgan & J.A.Sperling - Loreto region of eastern Peru
- Dracontium longipes Engl. - Peru, Acre State of Brazil
- Dracontium margaretae Bogner - Venezuela, Brazil, Bolivia, Paraguay
- Dracontium nivosum (Lem.) G.H.Zhu - Pará, Maranhão
- Dracontium peruvianum G.H.Zhu & Croat - Peru, northwestern Brazil
- Dracontium pittieri Engl. - Costa Rica
- Dracontium plowmanii G.H.Zhu & Croat - Peru
- Dracontium polyphyllum L. - Pará, French Guiana, Suriname, Venezuela, Peru, Puerto Rico
- Dracontium prancei G.H.Zhu & Croat - Amazonas and Roraima States of northwestern Brazil
- Dracontium purdieanum (Schott) Engl. - Colombia, Venezuela
- Dracontium soconuscum Matuda - Chiapas, Costa Rica, Panama
- Dracontium spruceanum (Schott) G.H.Zhu - Costa Rica, Panama, Colombia, Venezuela, northwestern Brazil, Ecuador, Peru, Suriname
- Dracontium ulei K.Krause - Acre State in western Brazil; Pando region of northern Bolivia
