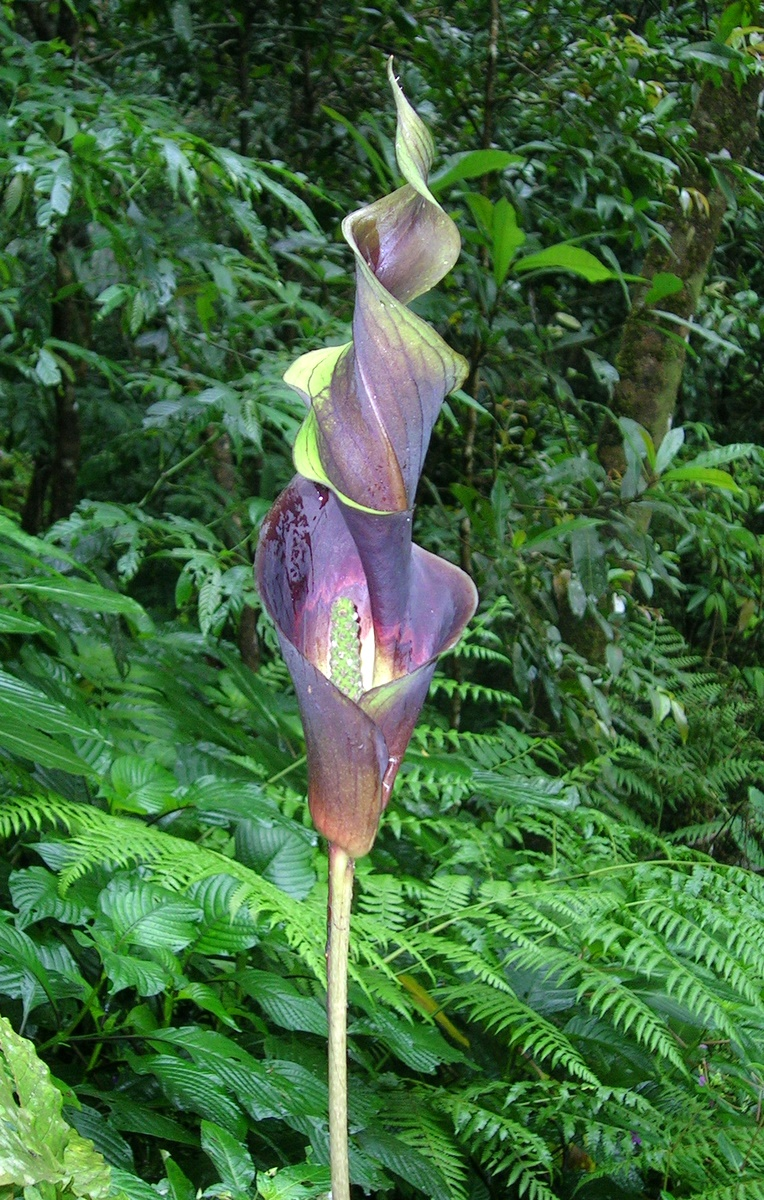

Scientific classification
- Kingdom: Plantae
- Clade: Tracheophytes
- Clade: Angiosperms
- Clade: Monocots
- Order: Alismatales
- Family: Araceae
- Genus: Anaphyllum
- Species: A. wightii

Binomial name
- Anaphyllum wightii Schott

= Anaphyllum wightii =

Genus of flowering plants

Anaphyllum wightii is a species of flowering plant in the family Araceae.

== Distribution ==
It is distributed in Laccadive Islands and SW India.

== Ecology ==
It is found in marshes, have leaves with some pinnation, and have a twisted spathe.
