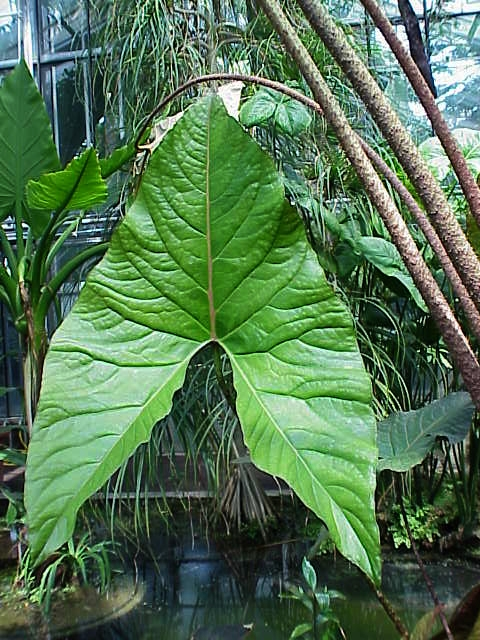
- Cyrtosperma johnstonii

Scientific classification
- Kingdom: Plantae
- Clade: Tracheophytes
- Clade: Angiosperms
- Clade: Monocots
- Order: Alismatales
- Family: Araceae
- Subfamily: Lasioideae
- Genus: Cyrtosperma; Griff.

Synonyms
- Arisacontis Schott

= Cyrtosperma =

Genus of flowering plants

Cyrtosperma is a genus of flowering plants in the family Araceae. The genus went through considerable taxonomic changes in the 1980s, and as a result is now considered to be native only to Southeast Asia and some Pacific islands. Previously, the genus was thought to be widespread from Asia to Africa and South America, but the African and South American species were subsequently moved into separate genera. Cyrtosperma is now known to be most prominent in New Guinea. The genus Cyrtosperma is unique in this regard because it is the only known big genus in Araceae that is known to be found east of Wallace's line.

Cyrtosperma merkusii, or pulaka, is grown as a root crop in Oceania.

Species

- Cyrtosperma beccarianum A.Hay - New Guinea
- Cyrtosperma bougainvillense A.Hay - Solomon Islands
- Cyrtosperma brassii A.Hay - Louisiade Archipelago
- Cyrtosperma carrii A.Hay - Papua New Guinea
- Cyrtosperma cuspidispathum Alderw. - New Guinea
- Cyrtosperma giganteum Engl. - New Guinea
- Cyrtosperma gressittiorum A.Hay - Louisiade Archipelago
- Cyrtosperma hambalii A.Dearden & A.Hay - Western New Guinea
- Cyrtosperma johnstonii (N.E.Br.) N.E.Br. - Solomon Islands
- Cyrtosperma kokodense A.Hay - Papua New Guinea
- Cyrtosperma macrotum Becc. ex Engl. - New Guinea
- Cyrtosperma merkusii (Hassk.) Schott - New Guinea, Solomon Islands, Borneo, Java, Sumatra, Philippines, Fiji, Samoa, Kiribati, Santa Cruz Islands, Cook Islands, Marquesas, Caroline Islands, Mariana Islands; naturalized on various other islands.

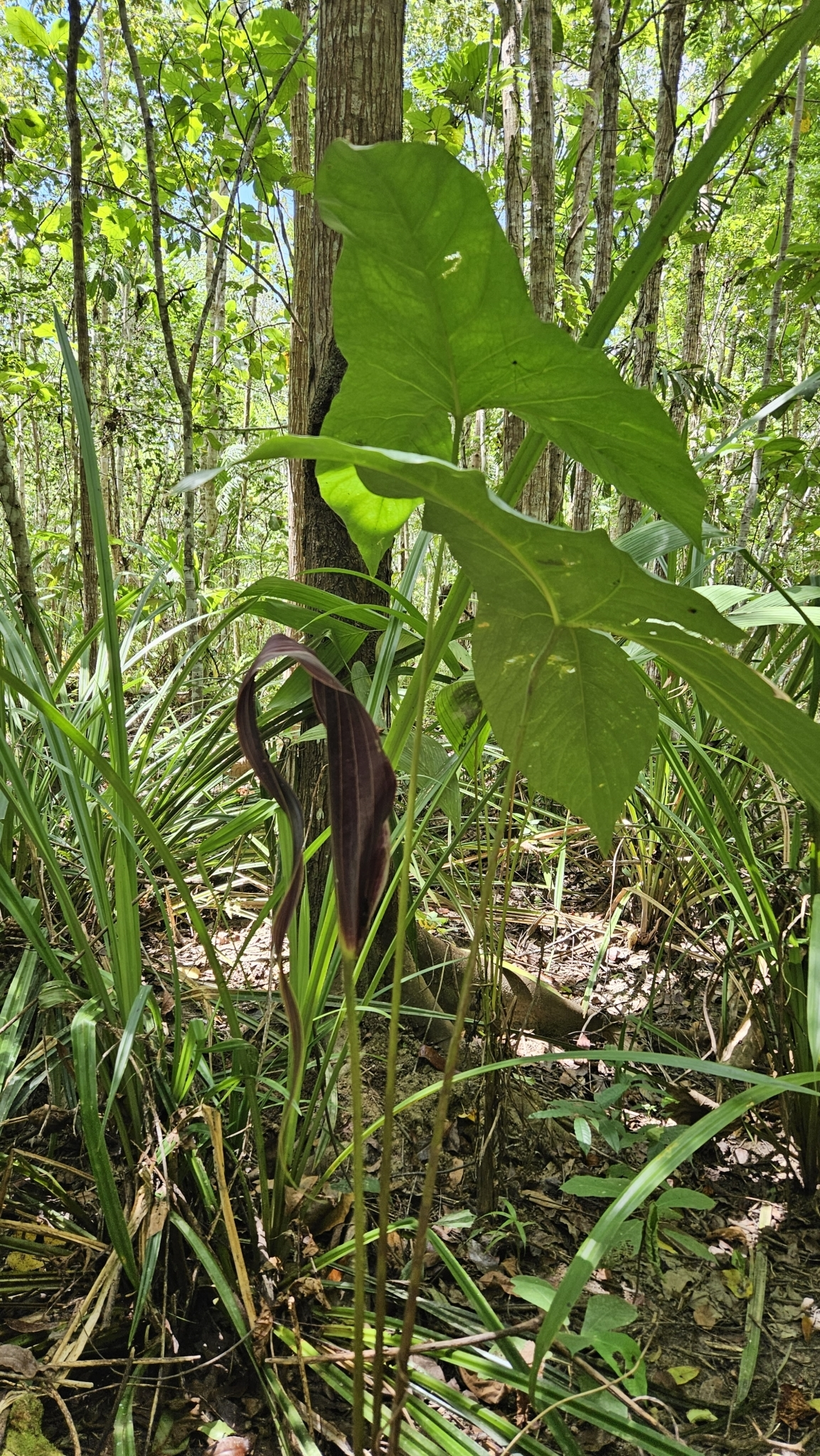
Cyrtosperma cuspidispathum growing in Papua, image from iNaturalist user: gancw1

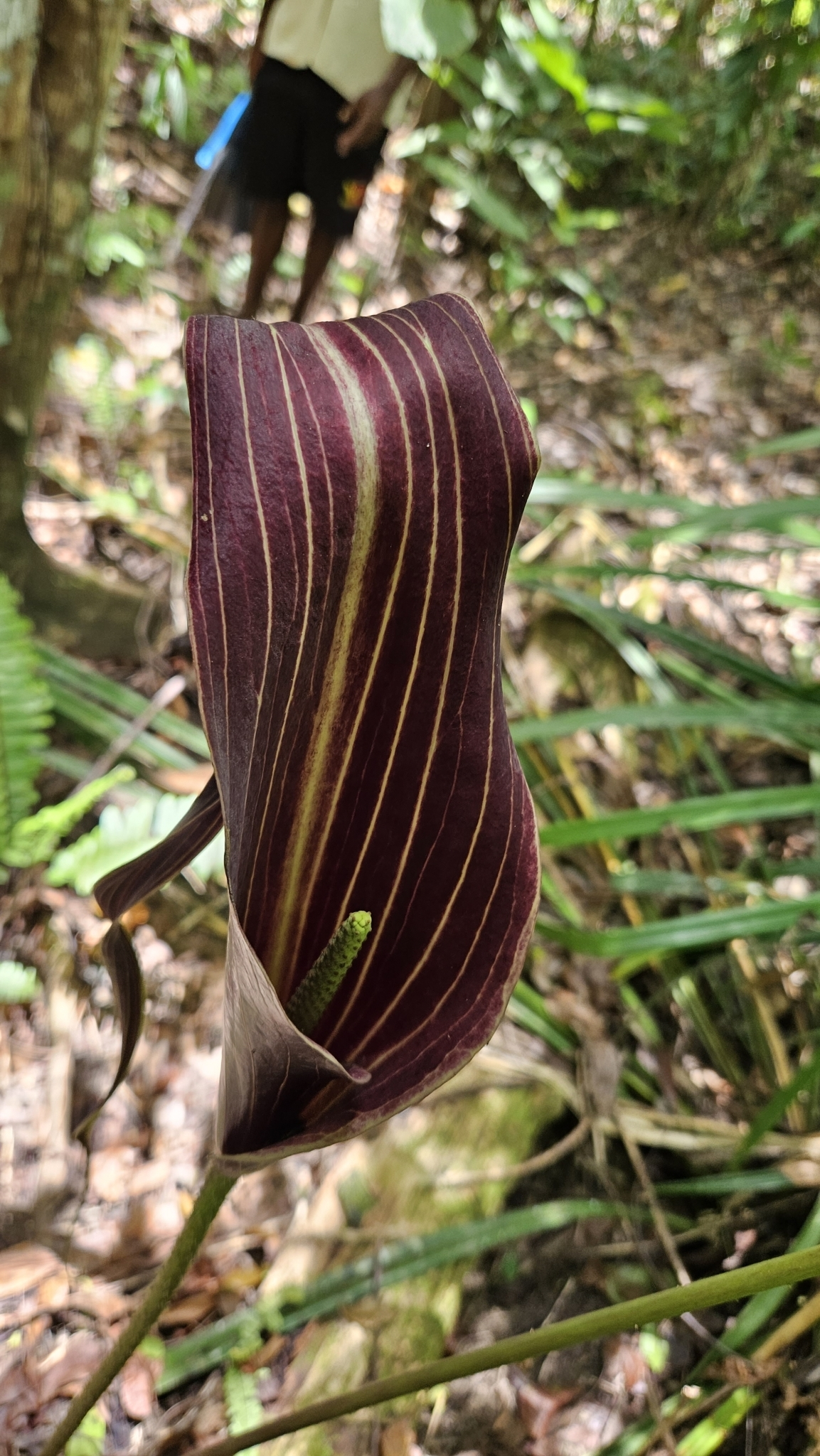
Cyrtosperma cuspidispathum inflorescence growing in Papua, image from iNaturalist user: gancw1
