= Khadimnagar National Park =

National park in Sylhet, Bangladesh

- IUCN category II (national park)
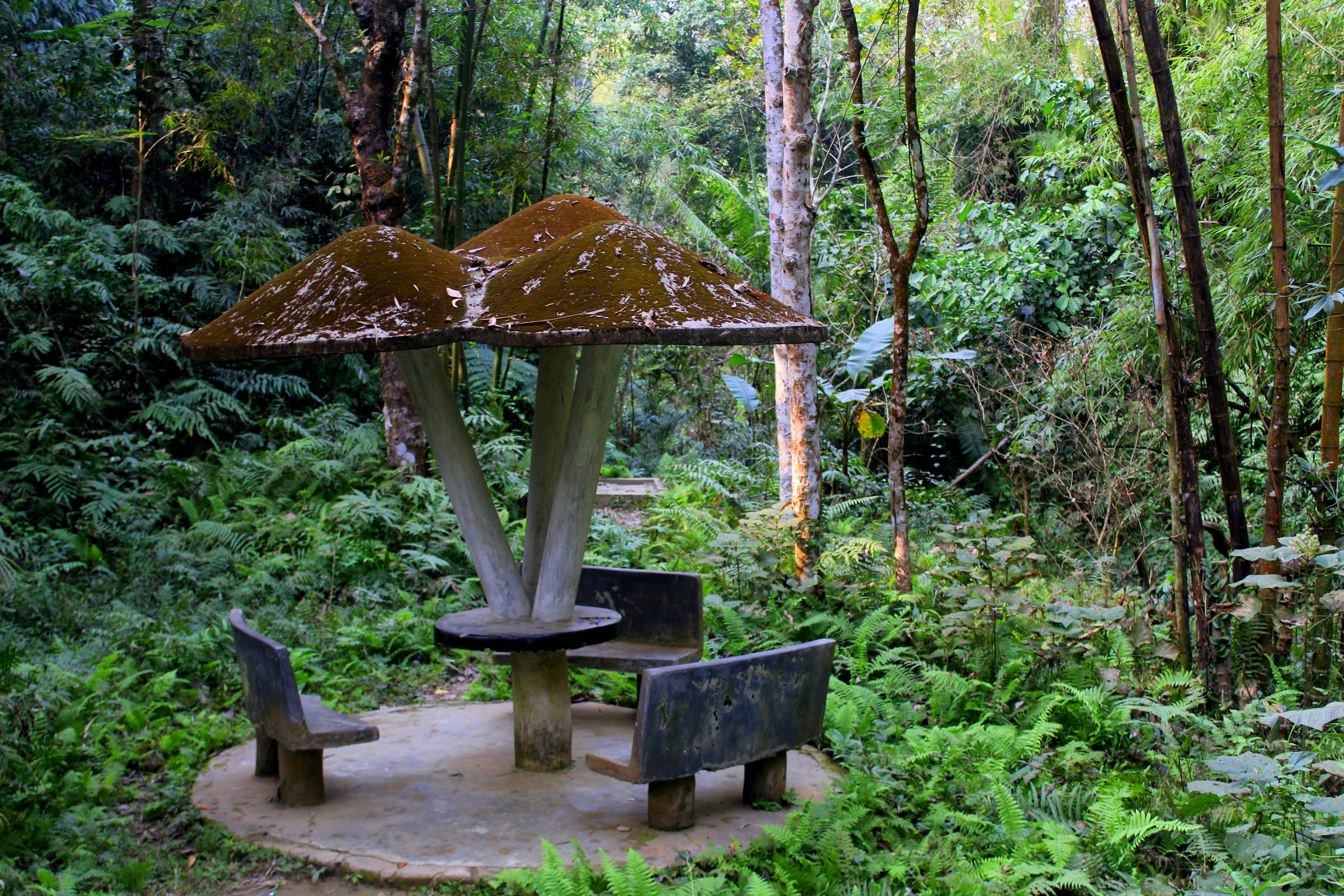
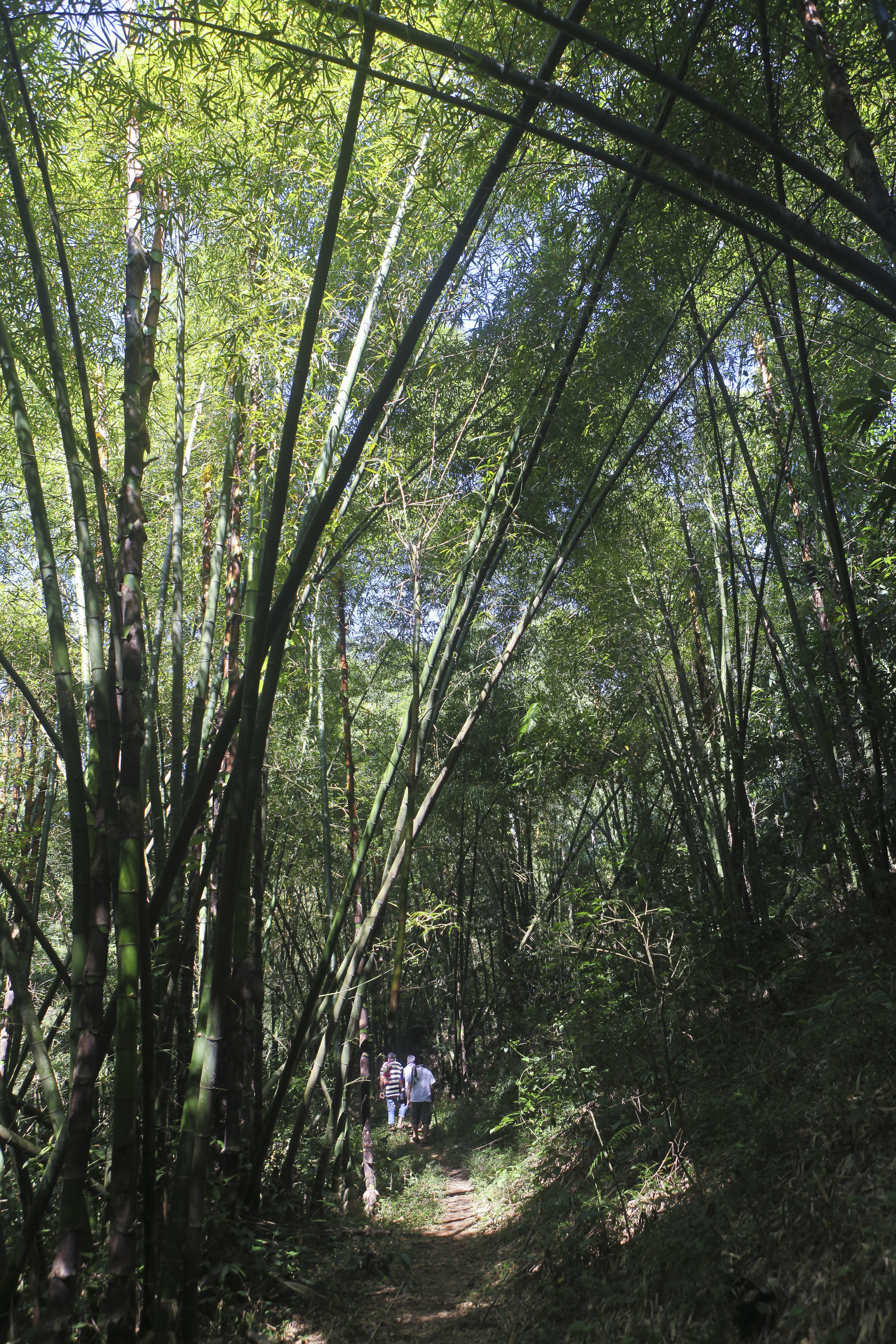
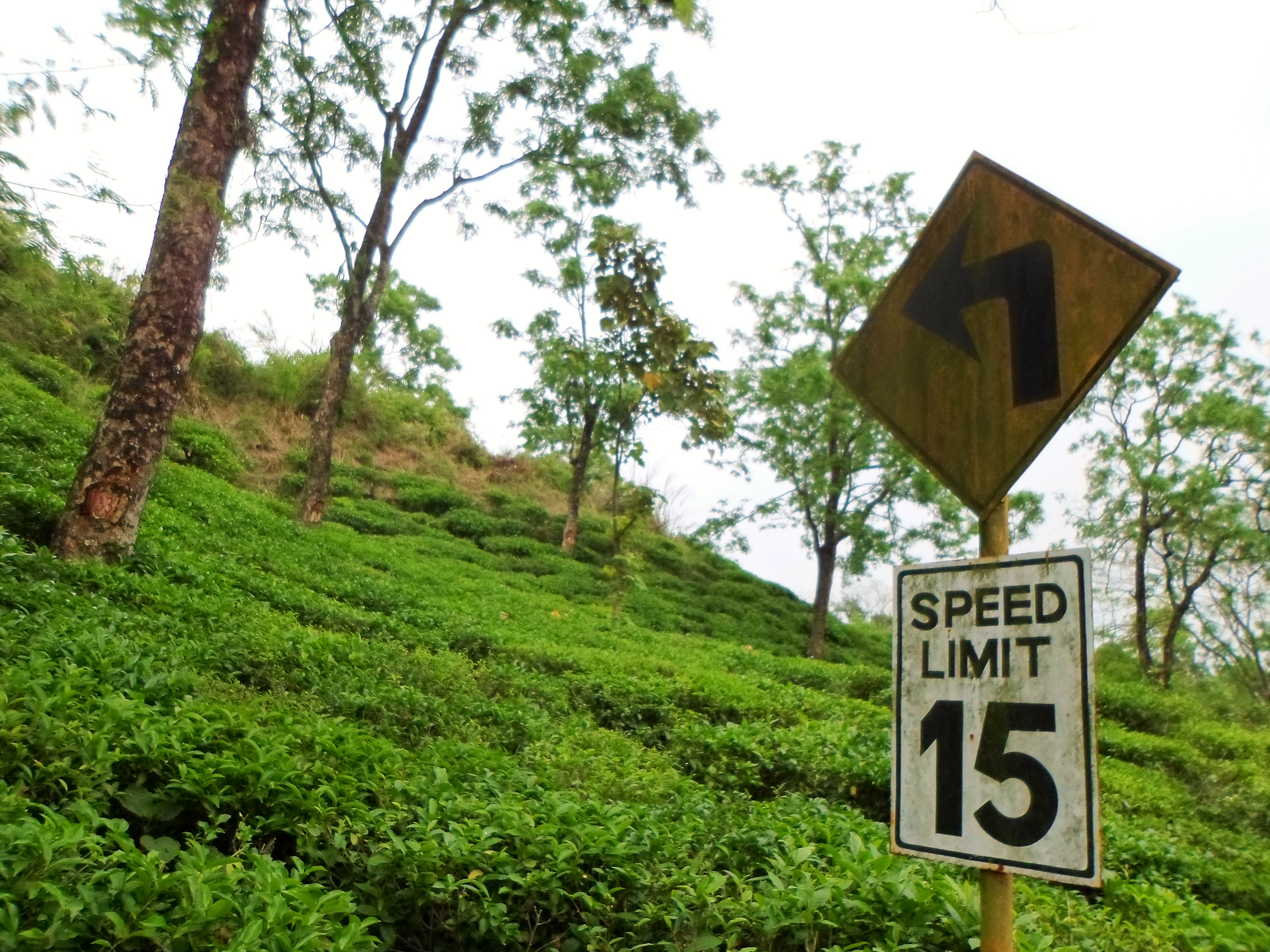
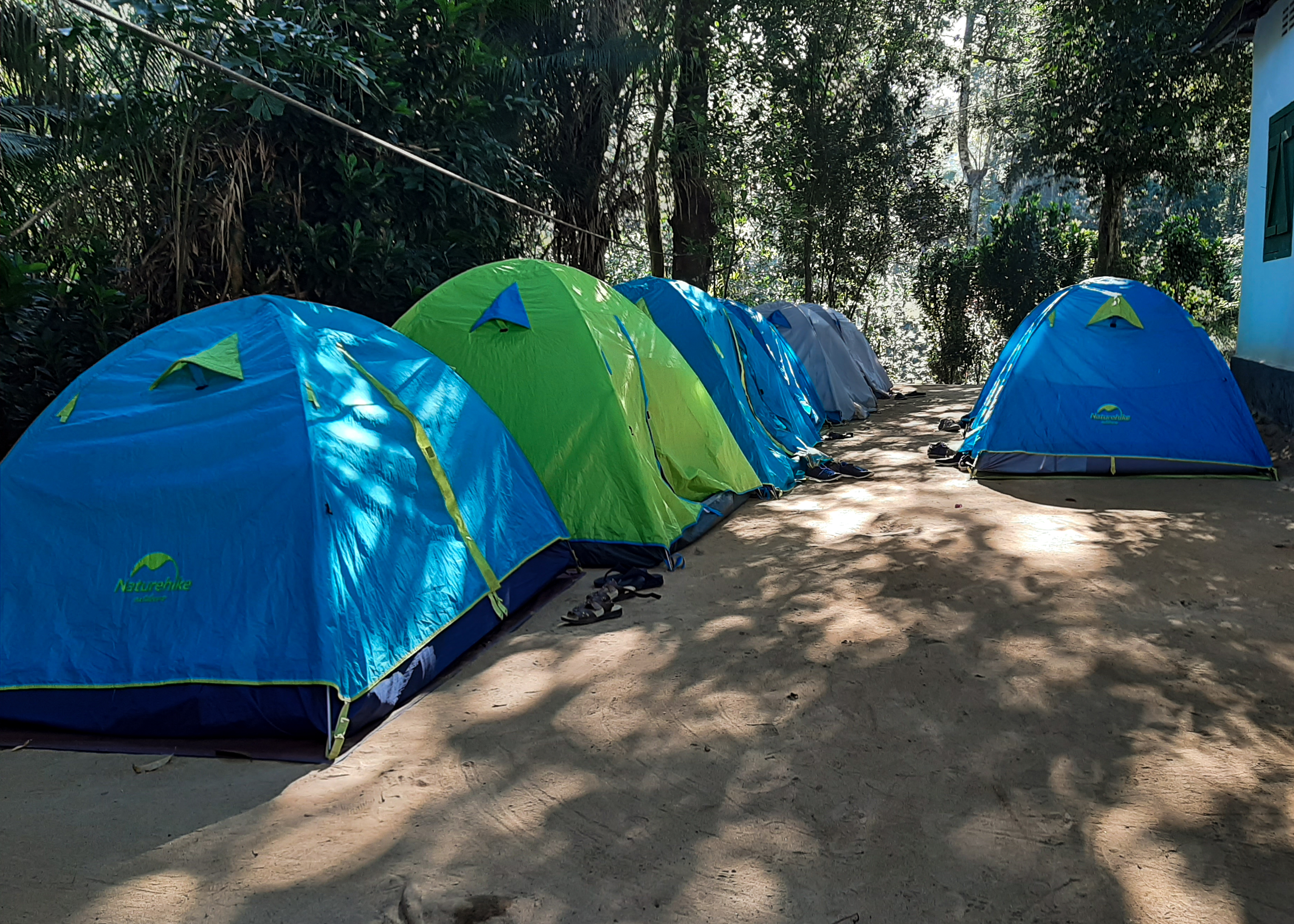
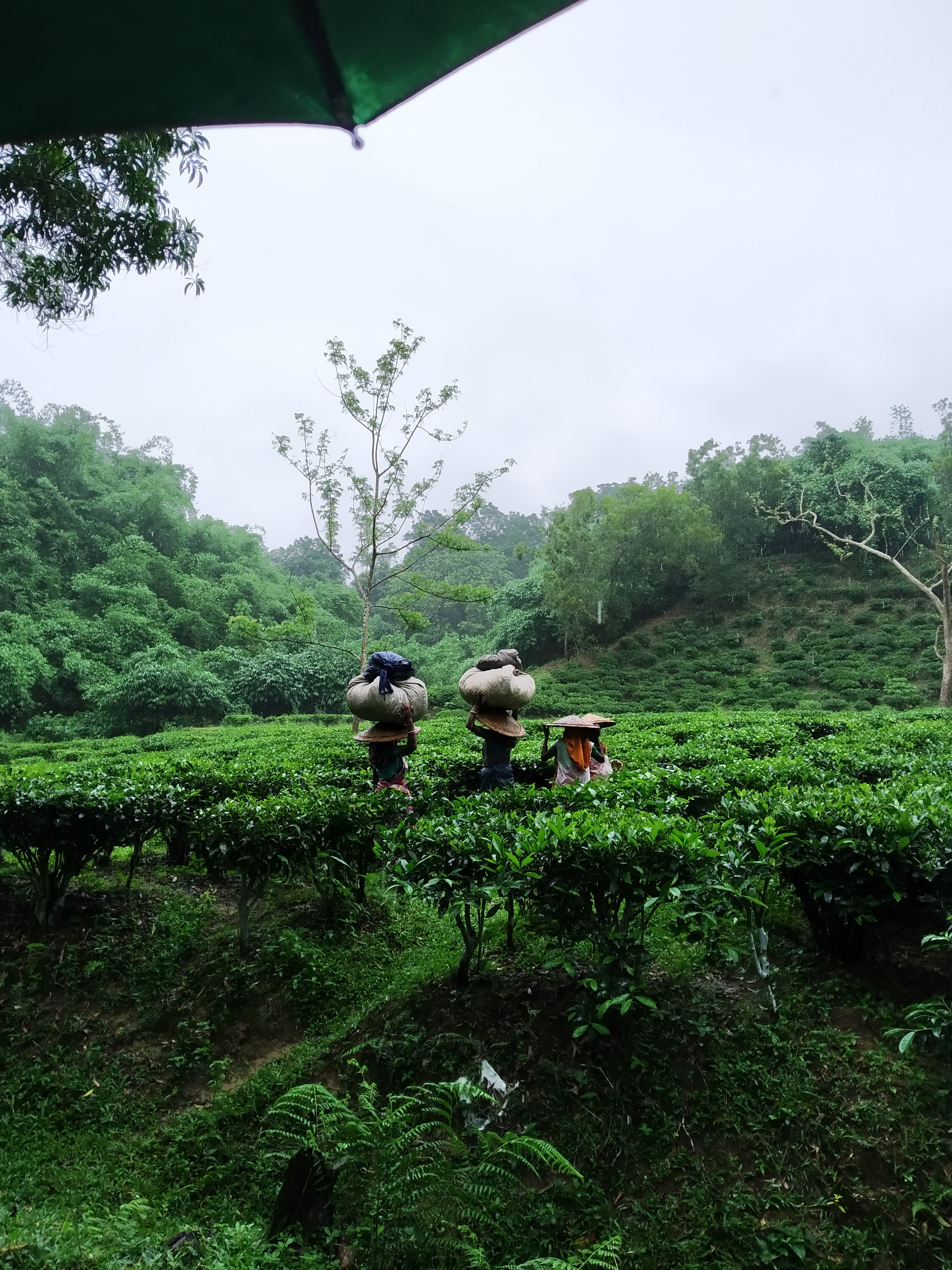
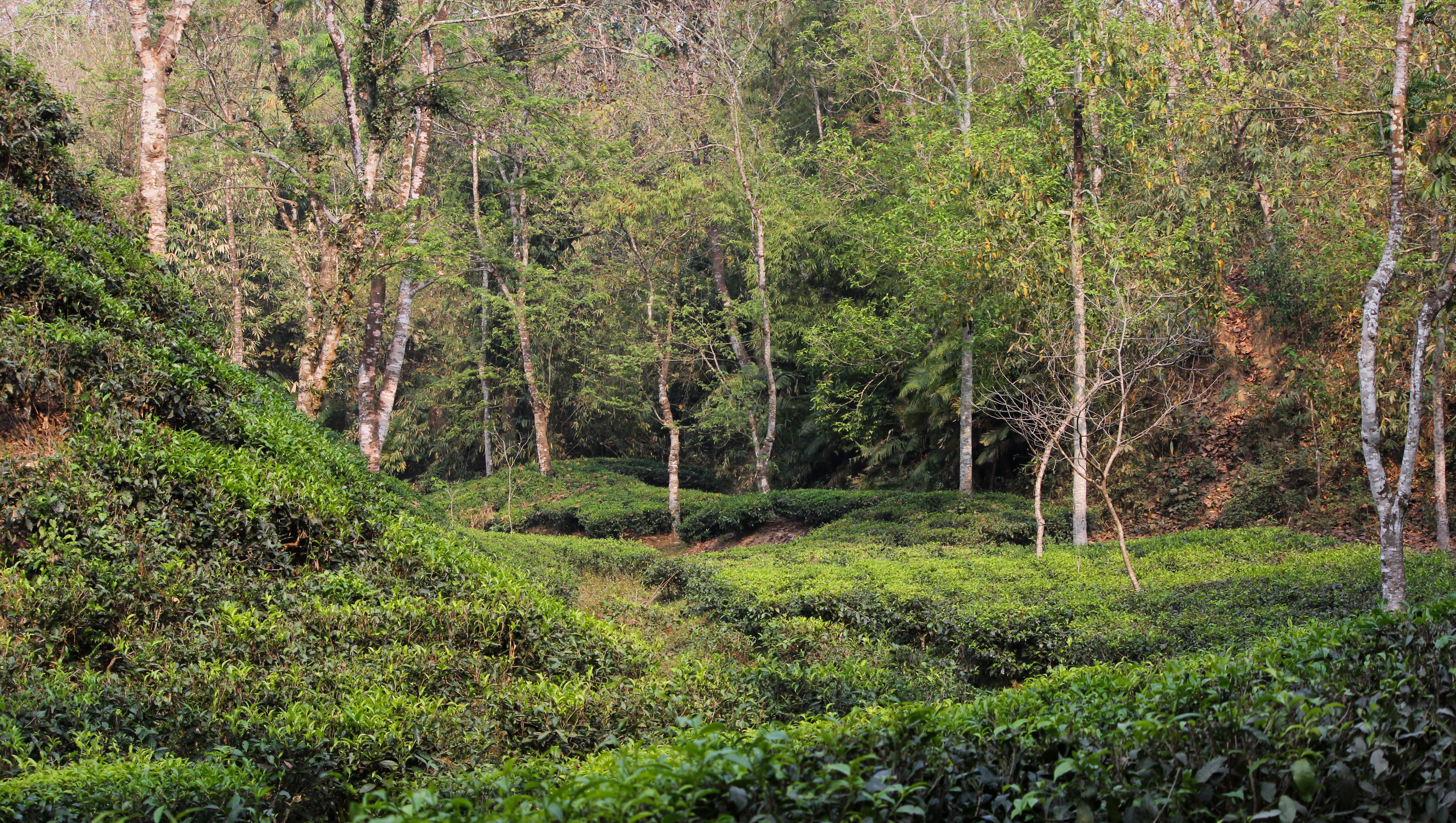

- Location within Bangladesh
- Location: Sadar, Sylhet, Bangladesh
- Nearest city: Sylhet
- Coordinates: 24°57′26″N 91°56′24.9″E
- Area: 678.80 ha (1,677.4 acres)
- Established: 13 April 2006

Khadimnagar National Park (Bengali: খাদিমনগর জাতীয় উদ্যান) is a major national park and nature reserve in Bangladesh. The park is located near the Sylhet City in the northeast region of the country. It is located mainly on the Hills and is surrounded by Kalagool, Bhurjan and Goolni tea estates. Khadimnagar National Park covers approximately 679 ha (6.79 km^{2}) of evergreen forest biome.

During the colonial period, the British cleared the area for extensive tea plantations. After 1950, tree plantations of teak, Garjan, Bamboo, Champa, Agar, Akashmoni, Eucalyptus and Acacia Mangium was carried out by Forest Department. The forest was declared as national park by the Bangladesh government on 13 April 2006 under the Bangladesh wildlife (Preservation) Amendment Act of 1947.

The present forest is divided into six forest working circles. The forest area has LR, SR, bamboo, cane and agar plantations.

== Location ==
It is located 13 km East of Sylhet town. The area is much undulating and dissected by streams and hill spurs. The overall appearance of the forest is various patches of artificial plantations of different ages. The park is 10 km in length and 0.50 km in width.

The climate is generally humid and warm. The park enjoys tropical monsoon from June to September every year. The soil is loamy, clay and sandy loam at various places.

== Plants and animals ==
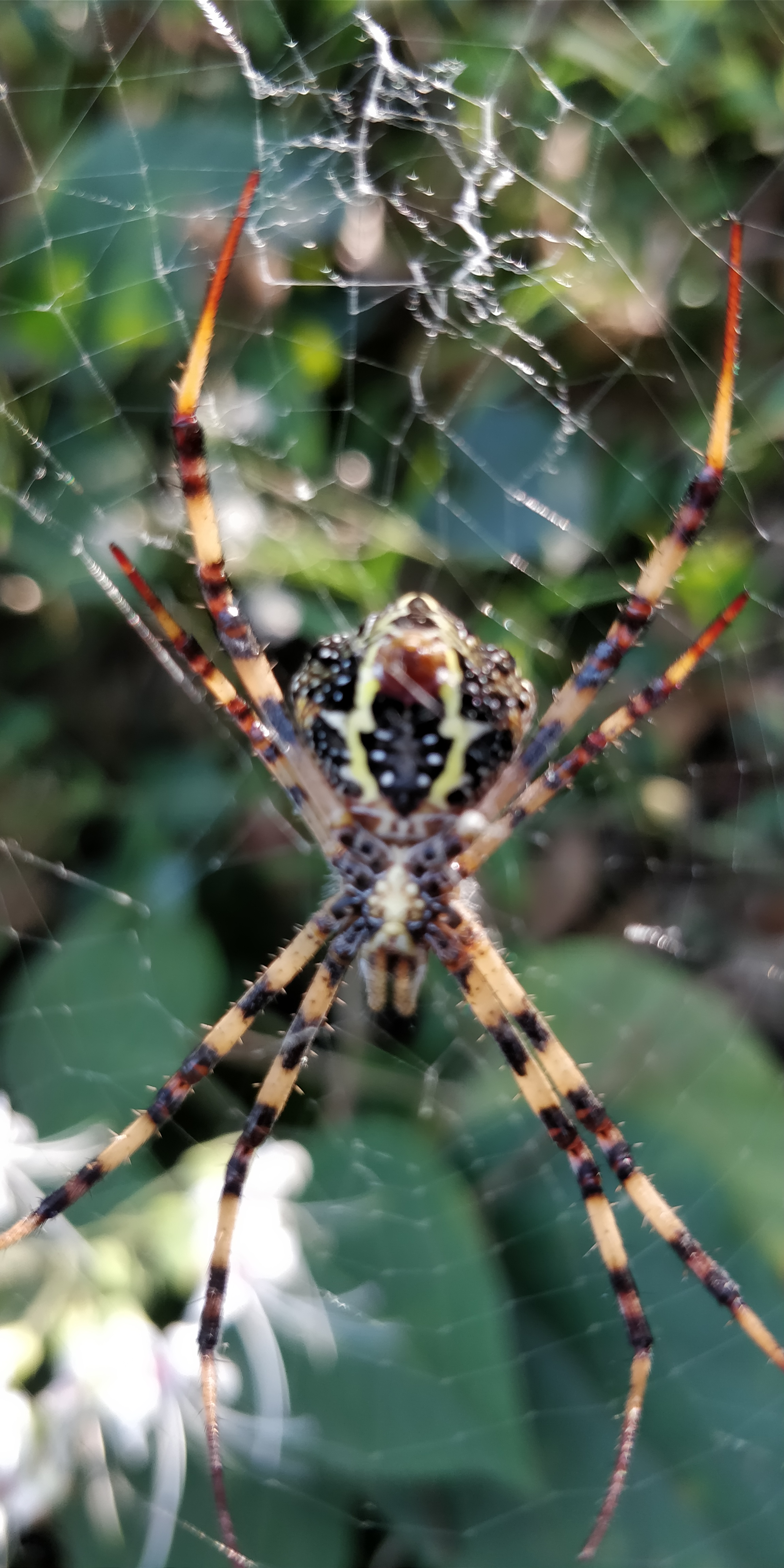
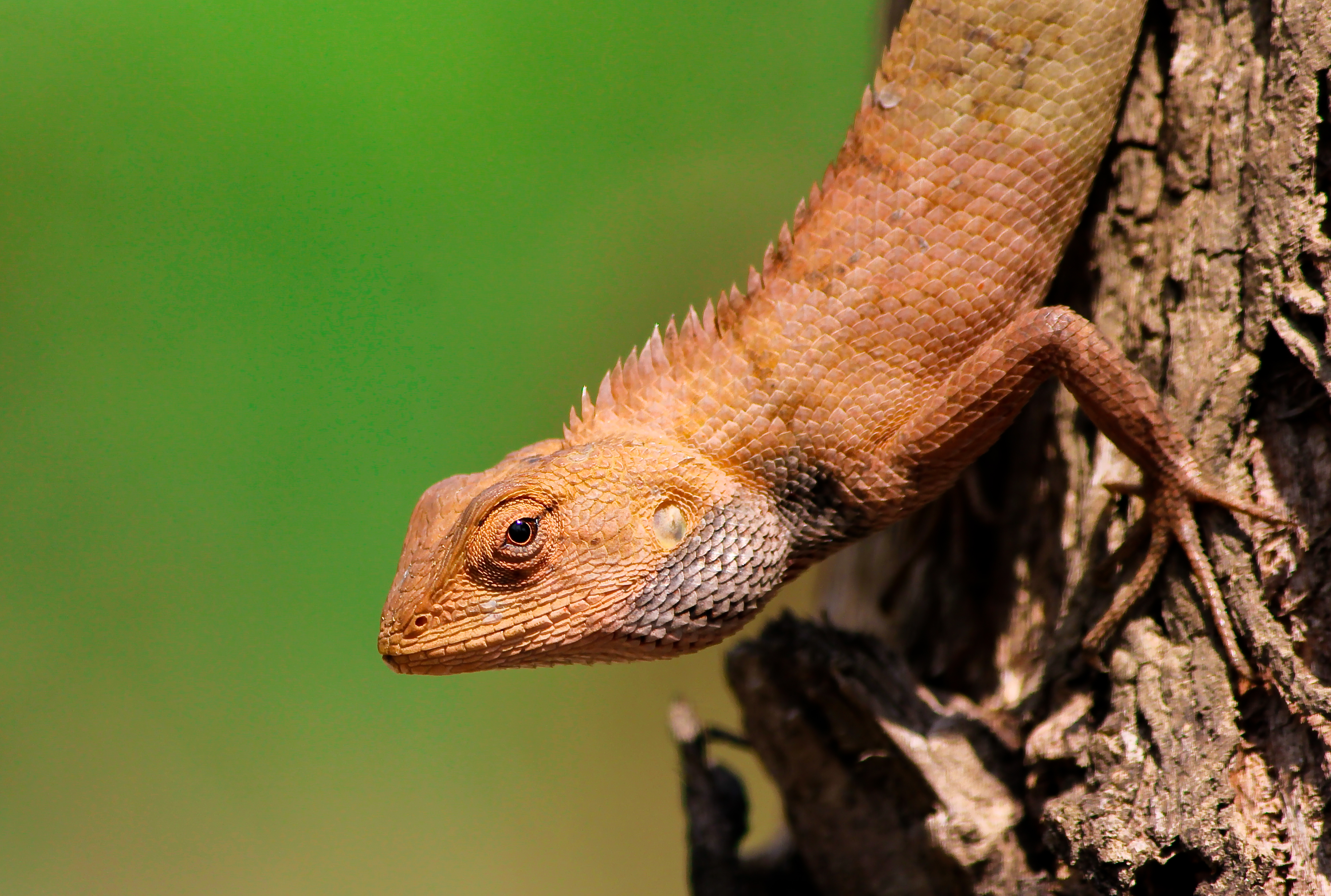
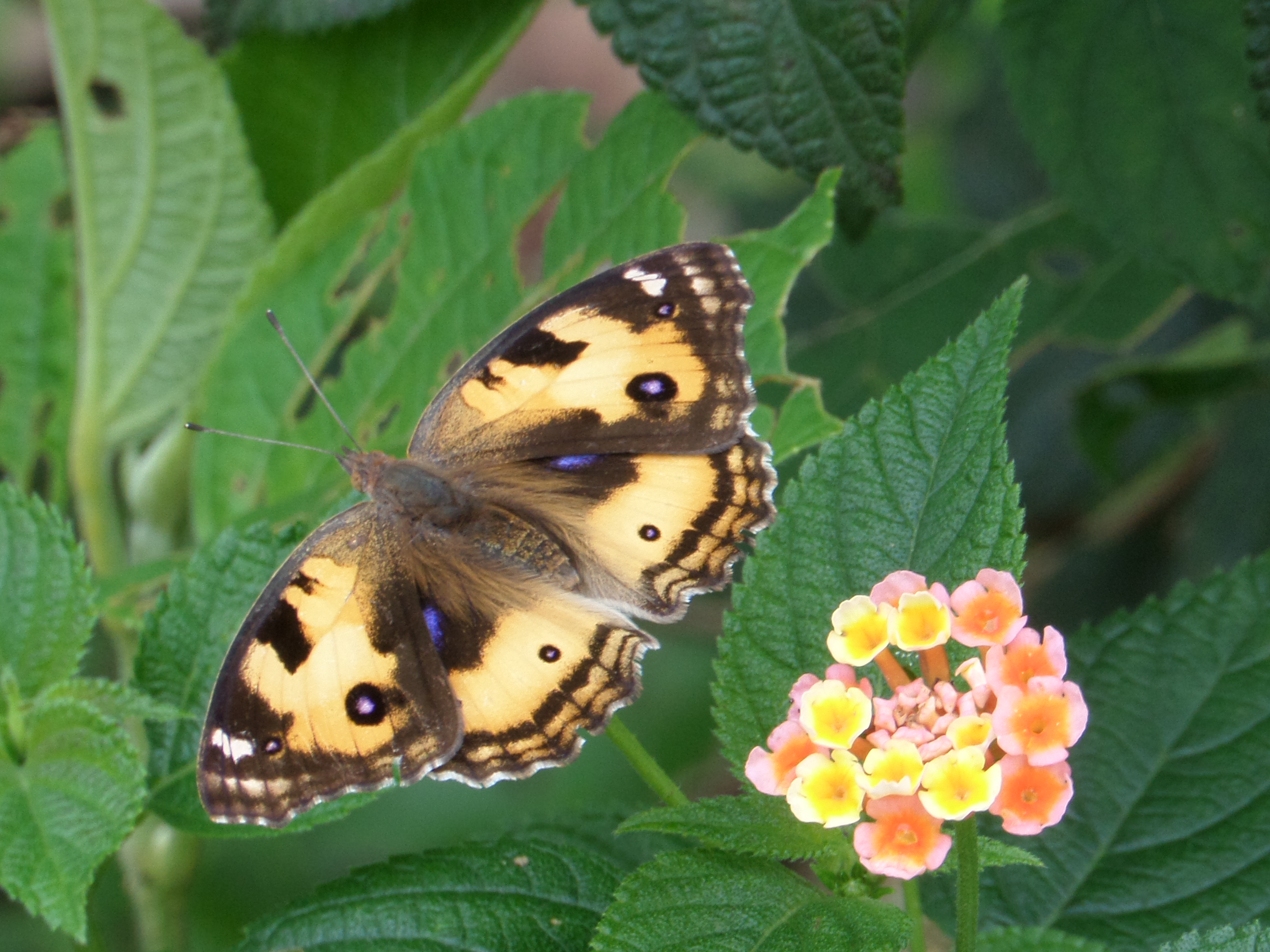
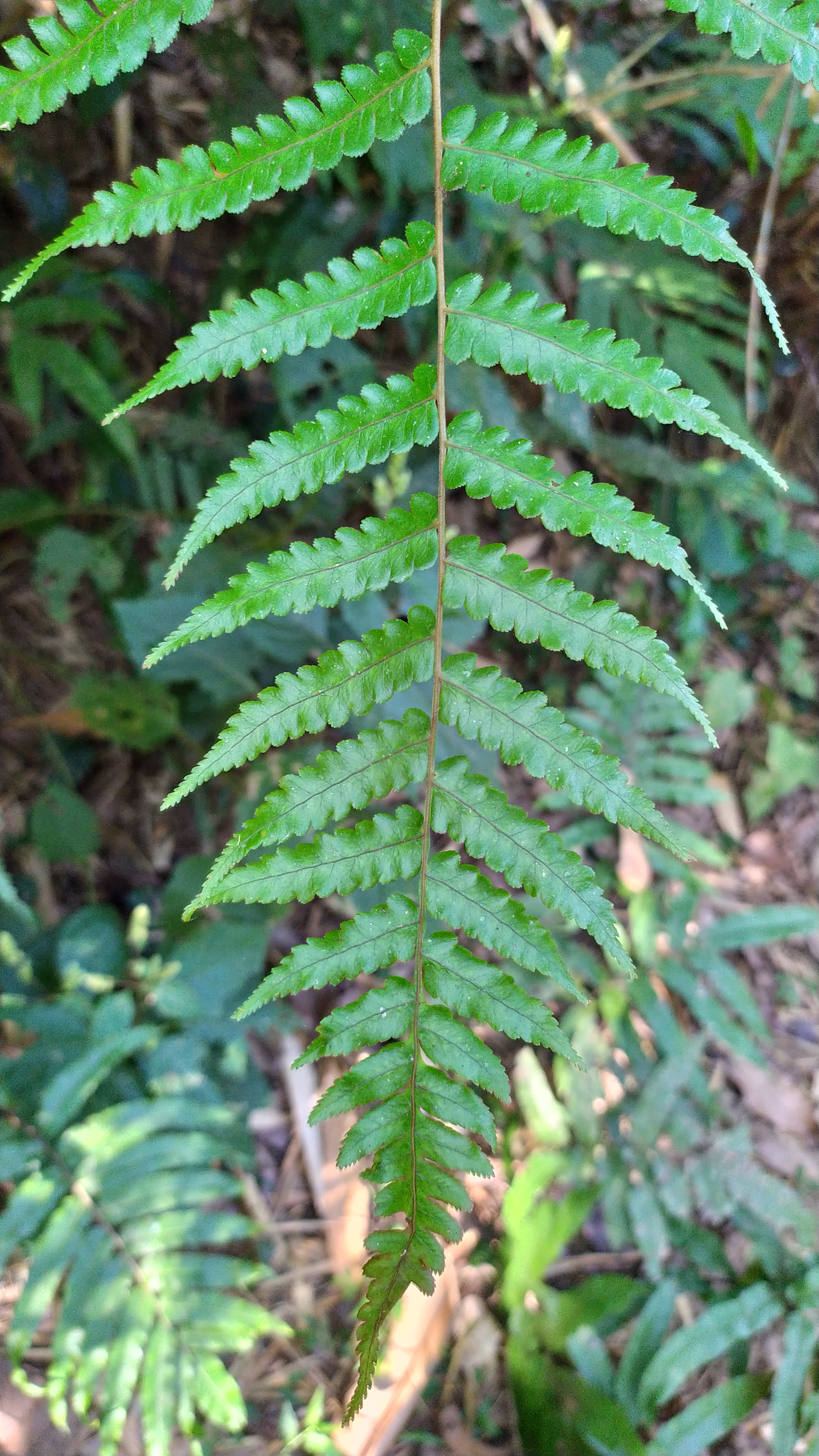
Flora and fauna of the Khadimnagar National Park

=== Flora ===
The general walk in the forest is not easy due to undulating terrain and dense vegetation. About 352 plant species belonging to 81 families have been recorded. Some plant species recorded are Aquilaria malaccensis (Agar), Dipterocarpus turbinatus, Artocarpus chama, Chukrasia tabularis, Toona ciliata, Syzygium grande, Tectona grandis, and Quercus gomeziana. The trees are covered with good number of parasites and orchids. Some of the common orchids are Aerides multiflora, Aerides odorata, Dendrobium formosum, and Bulbophyllum lilacinum. Plants species like Vitex peduncularis (Awal), Litsea glutinosa (Menda), Sterculia villosa (Udal) and Dehaasia kurzii (Modonmast) are under threat due to overexploitation. Some of the threatened plants found in the park are Swintonia floribunda, Aglaonema hookerianum, Aquilaria agallocha, Globba multiflora, Pterospermum semisaggittatum, Steudnera calocasioides, Pinnaga gracilis, Rauvolfia serpentina, Mangifera sylvatica, Calamus guruba and Gymnosphaera gigantea.

=== Fauna ===
The fauna consists of 20 reptile species, 25 bird species and 26 mammal species.

== Gallery ==
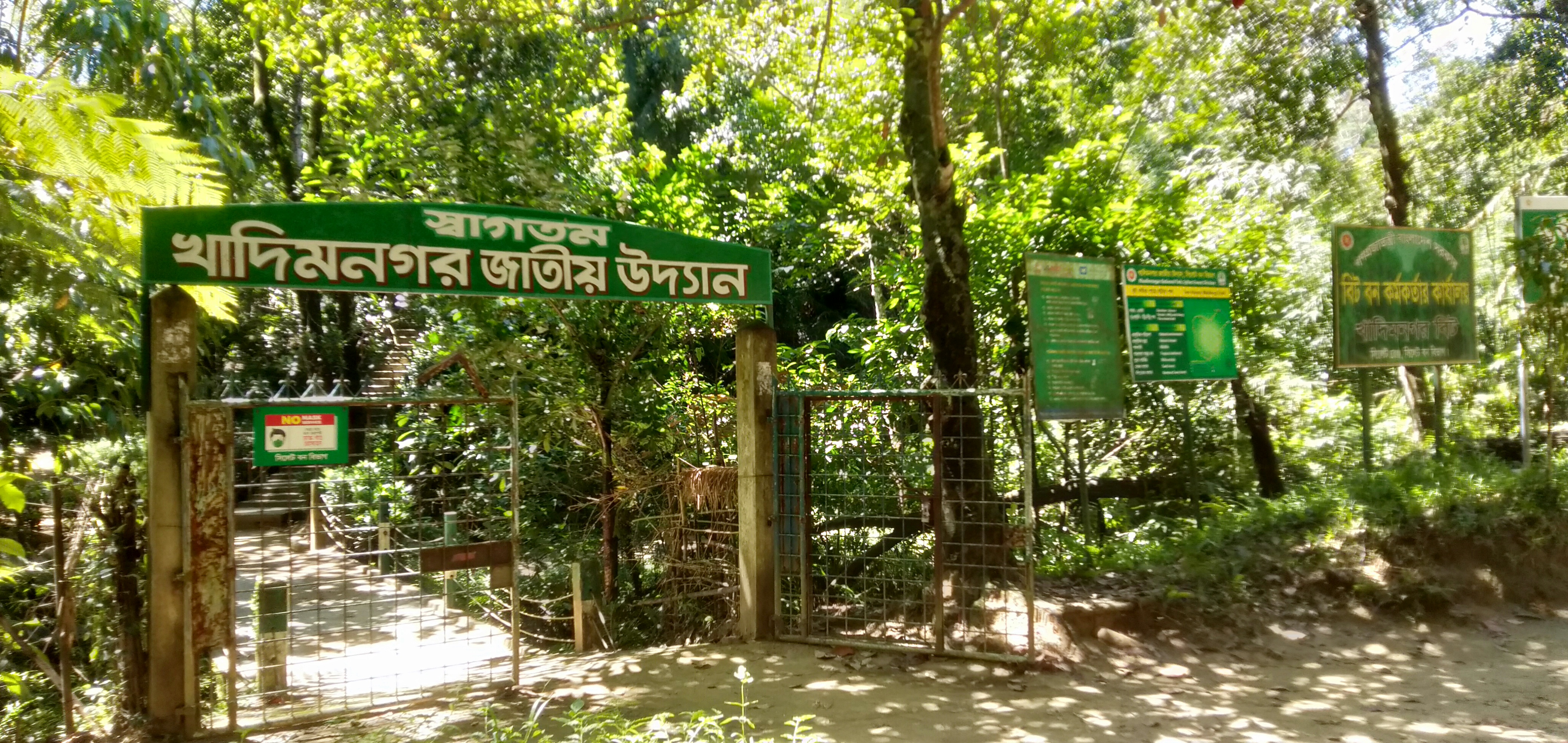
Entrance

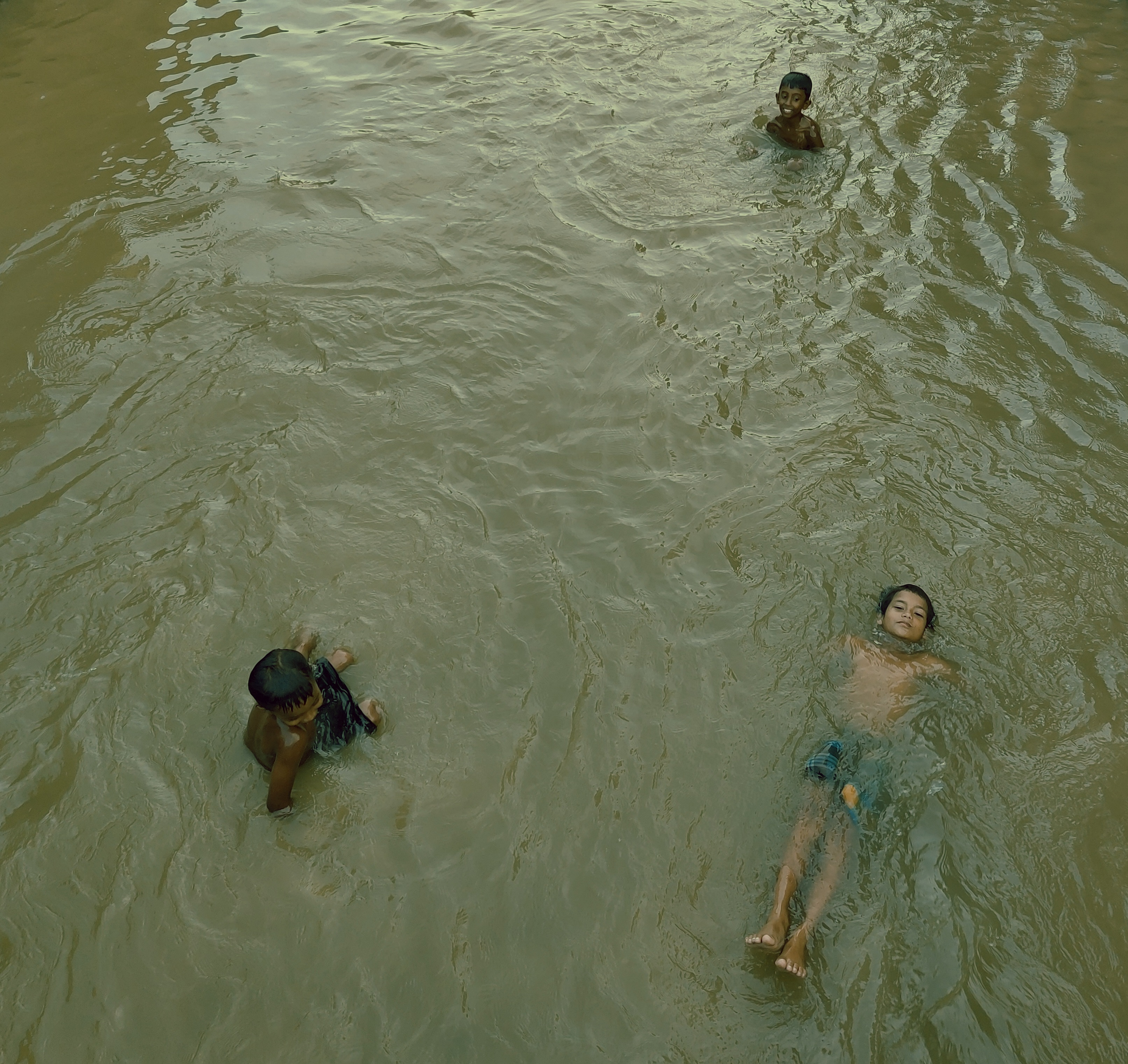
Children swimming in the pond

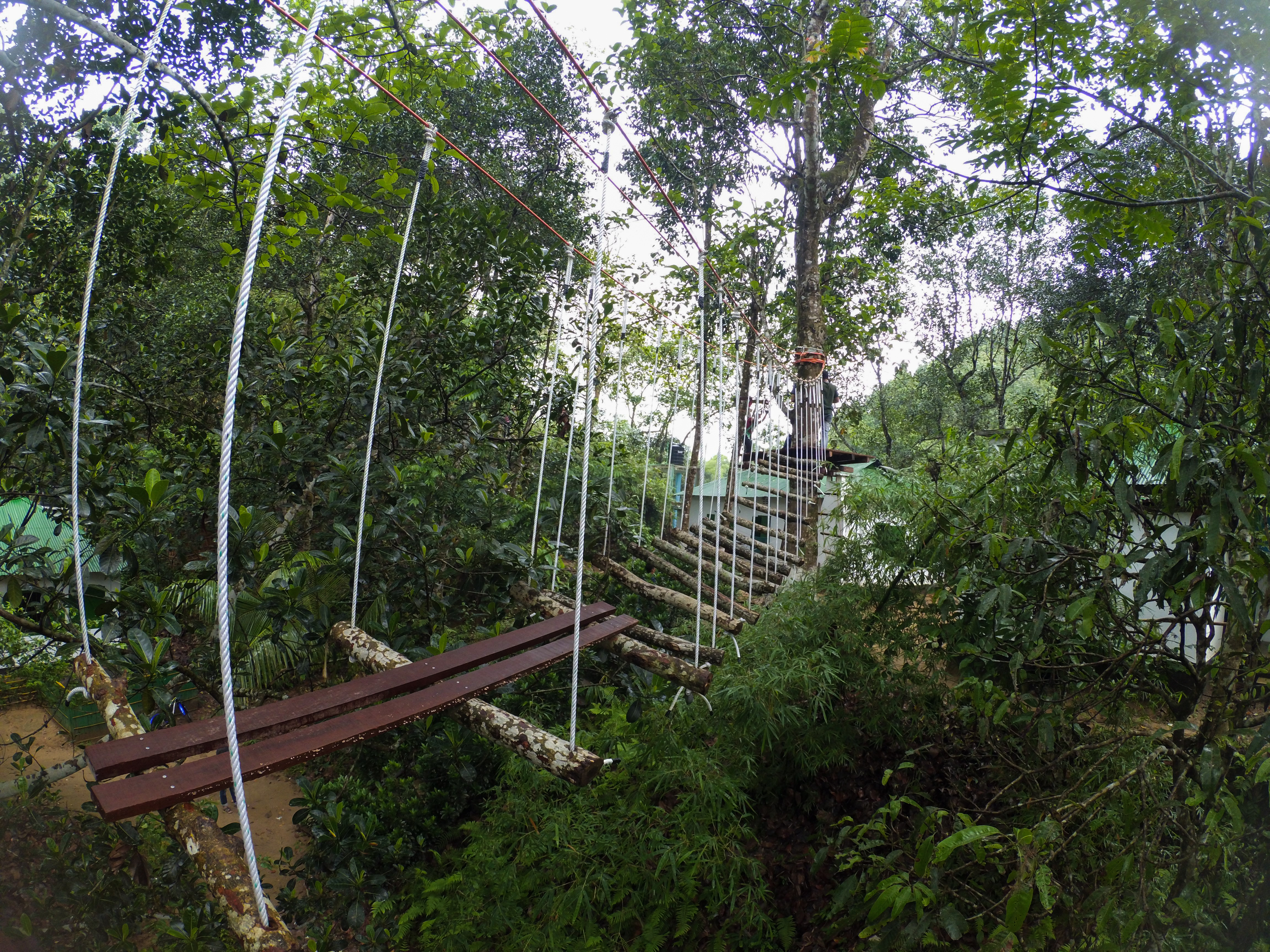
Hanging bridge

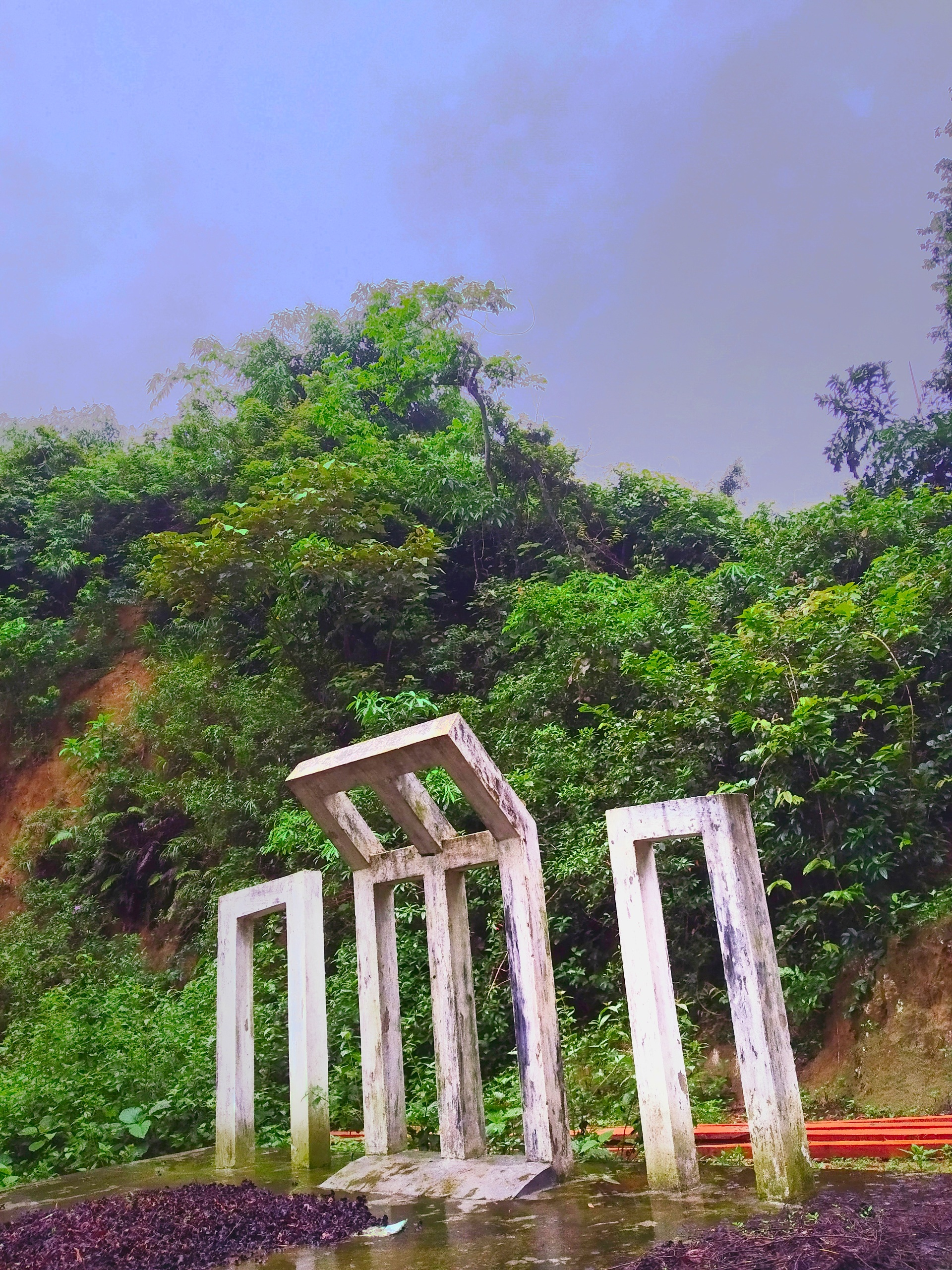
Shaheed Minar

== See also ==
- List of protected areas of Bangladesh
