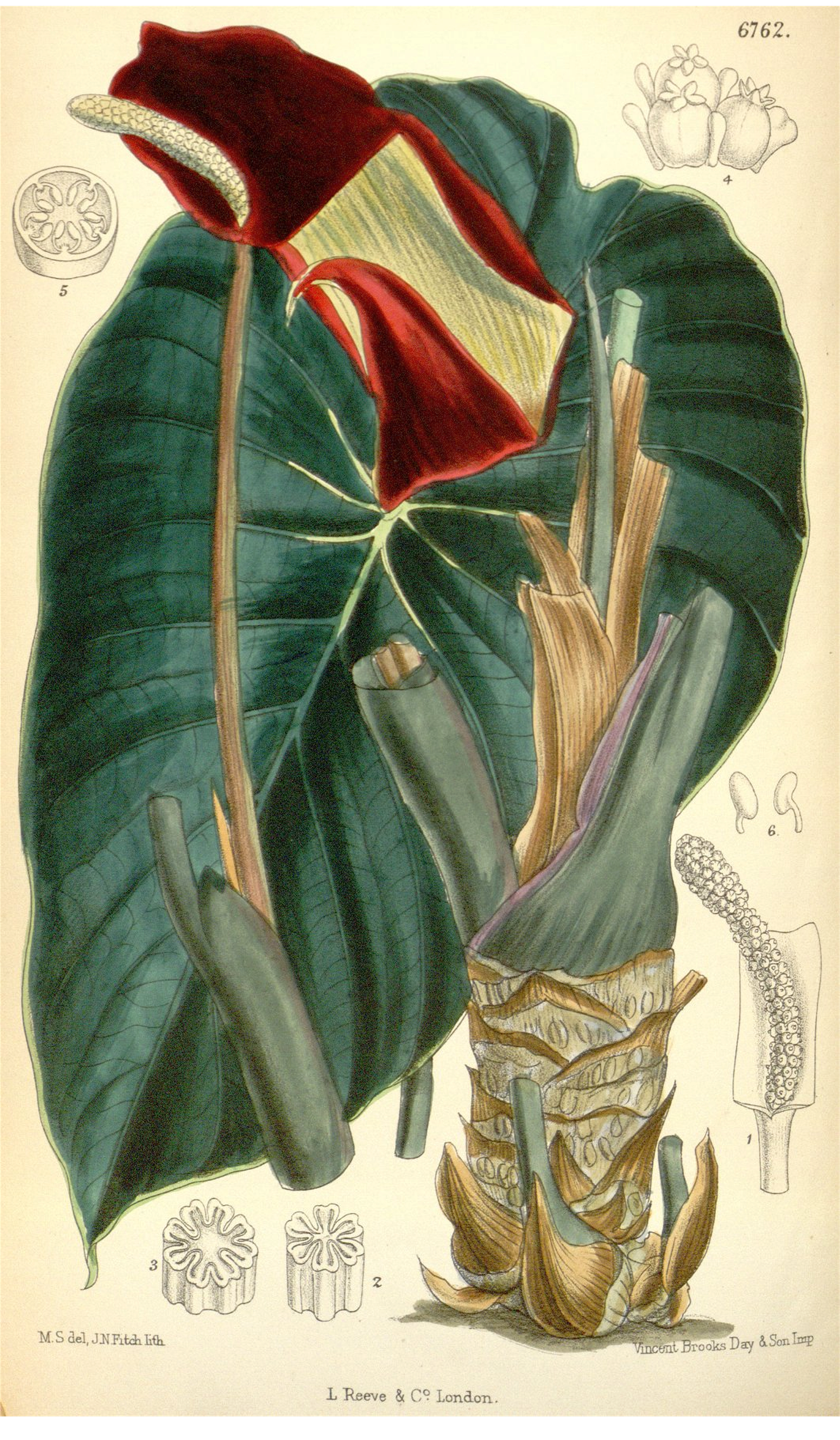
- Botanical illustration from Curtis's Botanical Magazine (1888)

Scientific classification
- Kingdom: Plantae
- Clade: Tracheophytes
- Clade: Angiosperms
- Clade: Monocots
- Order: Alismatales
- Family: Araceae
- Genus: Steudnera
- Species: S. colocasiifolia

Binomial name
- Steudnera colocasiifolia K.Koch (1862)

Synonyms
- Gonatanthus peltatus Van Houtte (1875)

= Steudnera colocasiifolia =

Species of plant

Steudnera colocasiifolia is a species of arum family, native to the wet tropical region from Assam, Bangladesh, South-Central and Southeast China to Indochina. It is known as Bishkachu (poison arum) in Bengali and Quan qi in Chinese language.

== Taxonomy ==
Steudnera colocasiifolia was first described by German botanist Karl Koch in Wochenschrift für Gärtnerei und Pflanzenkunde in 1862 as S. colocasiaefolia. Previously, it had a variety named S. colocasiifolia var. discolor, which later have become accepted as a distinct species S. discolor. Despite being closely alied to S. discolor, S. colocasiifolia is a larger and coarser plant which features stronger nerves, longer and differently coloured spathes and fewer staminodes.

== Description ==
Steudnera colocasiifolia is an evergreen subshrub to medium-sized robust herb. Its stems are short, rhizomatous, epigeal, poisonous, creeping or ascending. They are erect in the first stage of the plant's life and later become decumbent. They can be 20–50 cm (8–20 in) in length and 1.5–2.5 cm (0.6–1.0 in) in diameter. They are moderately covered with tattered, brown and non-netted cataphylls and leaf remains while their older portions become naked.

Steudnera colocasiifolia's leaves resemble those of Colocasia, hence acquiring the species' name. The leaves are solitary, but are together at the shoot tips. They can grow up to 15–30 cm (5.9–11.8 in) in length and 8–20 cm (3.1–7.9 in) in width. The leafblades are peltate to ovate or obovate, subleathery and concolorous. Base of the leaves are retuse and apexes are acuminate or acute. Leaves are membranaceous and the epidermes are hydrophobic. Adaxial surfaces of the leaves are glaucous and medium green in colour, while abaxial surfaces are paler green with purple suffusion. Veins are pale green. The petioles are slender, cylindrical and terete and pale green in colour. They are generally 15–25 cm (5.9–9.8 in) in length and 3–5 mm in diameter, but can grow up to 30–50 cm (12–20 in) long. Petiolar sheaths are very short.

The inflorescences and fruits generally occur during the months of April–May each year. The inflorescences are solitary and spadix by type. It does not have a strong fragrance. Spadices are 3–4 cm (1.2–1.6 in) to 4–7 cm (1.6–2.8 in) in length and 4–7 mm in diameter. They do not have appendices and are much shorter than the spathes. The peduncles are up to 15–20 cm (5.9–7.9 in) long, terete and pale green to violate in colour. They are shorter than the petioles.

The spathes are broadly ovate-lanceolate, long caudate-acuminate, and reflex on opening. They can be 15–18 cm (5.9–7.1 in) in length and 8–10 cm (3.1–3.9 in) in diameter. Upper portions of the spathes withers soon and are marcescence, while lower portions are persistent into fruiting. They are concolorous and golden yellow without dark purple colour within. Spathe limbs are externally dull brownish yellow, with suffused dull red and are internally dull yellow, with the red colour suffusing much of the spathe. The base of the spathes is red-purple internally and somewhat greenish red externally. This coloration gives the whole spathe a dull orange appearance.

Male zones are ellipsoid and obtuse. They are usually 1–1.5 cm long and 5–6 mm in diameter. Stamens are connate, cylindrical and oblong. They have ivory-like colour. Anthers are 5-7 in number and are dehiscence by apical pores. synandria are 1–2 by 1.5–2.5 mm in dimension. They have 4–6 androceums and are somewhat rounded stellate-polygonal. On the contrary, the pistillate female zones are cylindric and creamy white in colour. They can be up to 2–2.5 cm (0.79–0.98 in) long. Approximately three-fourth of the length is dorsally adnate to the spathe. The ovaries are subglobose and penta-loculate with numerous ovules. They are 2–3 by 0.5–1 mm in dimension. They are surrounded by a whorl of 5–8 clavate staminodes. styles are short. Stigmata have 3–5 ascending lobes each. The lobes are blunt and do not exceed the style.

Fruits are berry with many seeds. Infructescences are not seen in this species.

== Distribution and habitat ==
Steudnera colocasiifolia is native to tropical regions, from Northeast India (Assam), Bangladesh, Cambodia, South Central and Southeast China, Laos, Myanmar, Thailand, and Vietnam. It grows in the dense forested areas and shady places, in 600–1,400 m (2,000–4,600 ft) elevation. Specifically, it grows in seasonally moist lowland forests, wet meadows or by the streams. It is known as Bishkachu (poison arum) in Bengali, a common name shared with various other arums, including Alocasia fornicata, S. colocasioides and S. virosa etc. S. colocasiifolia can be found in many parts of Bangladesh, as well as in Chittagong and the Chittagong Hill Tracts, where it is known as Ekdeijja kochu or Chadara Kochu. In Thailand, it grows in the northern regions of the country. In Myanmar, it is found in Martaban and the Karen Hills region. In China, it grows in the Guangxi and Yunnan regions, where it is known as Quan qi. It also grows in the northern parts of Laos and Vietnam.

== Medicinal use ==
The poisonous stems of Steudnera colocasiifolia are used to treat injuries and cuts, snake and insect bites, vasculitis, and skin ulcers etc.
