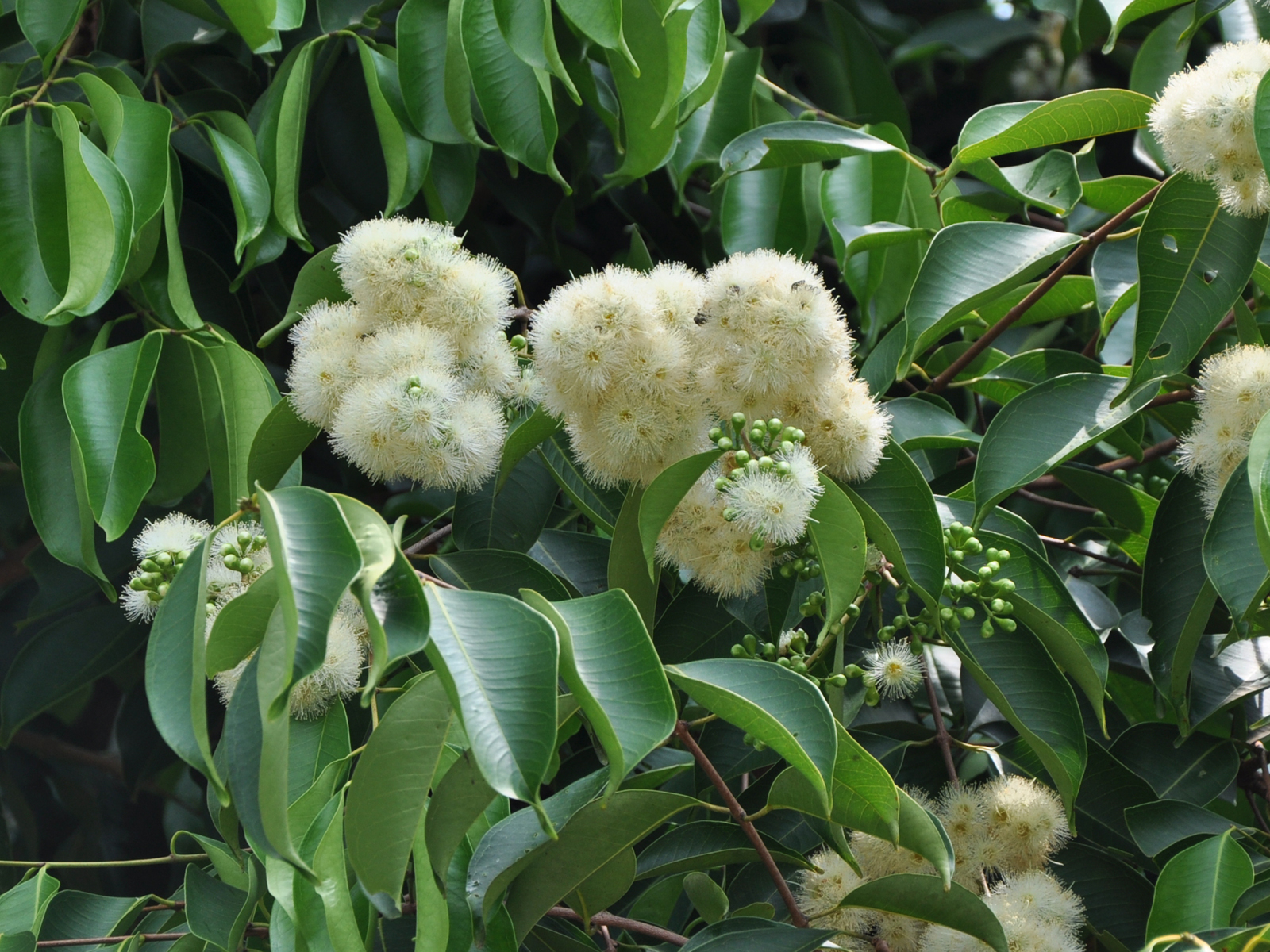

Conservation status
- Least Concern (IUCN 3.1)

Scientific classification
- Kingdom: Plantae
- Clade: Tracheophytes
- Clade: Angiosperms
- Clade: Eudicots
- Clade: Rosids
- Order: Myrtales
- Family: Myrtaceae
- Genus: Syzygium
- Species: S. grande

Binomial name
- Syzygium grande (Wight) Walp.

Synonyms
- Eugenia cymosa Roxb. nom. illeg.; Eugenia grandis Wight; Eugenia laosensis Gagnep.; Eugenia laosensis var. quocensis Gagnep.; Jambosa firma Blume; Jambosa grandis (Wight) Blume; Syzygium endertii Merr. & L.M.Perry; Syzygium firmum (Blume) Thwaites; Syzygium grande var. parviflorum Chantar. & J.Parn.; Syzygium laosense (Gagnep.) Merr. & L.M.Perry; Syzygium laosense var. quocense (Gagnep.) H.T.Chang & R.H.Miao; Syzygium megalophyllum Merr. & L.M.Perry; Syzygium montanum Thwaites & Hook.f.

= Syzygium grande =

Species of tree

Syzygium grande or sea apple is a species of tree native to tropical Asia. It is an evergreen tree which can grow up to 20 metres tall. Its leaves are large with dark green color. It is native to Indochina (Cambodia, Laos, Myanmar, Thailand, and Vietnam), the Andaman Islands, Bangladesh, northeastern India, south-central China, Peninsular Malaysia, Borneo, and Sumatra, and possibility to southern India and Sri Lanka. It grows in lowland tropical moist forest and along roadsides.

The species was first described as Eugenia grandis by Robert Wight in 1841. In 1843, Wilhelm Gerhard Walpers placed the species in genus Syzygium as S. grande.
