= Quercus gomeziana =

Conservation status
- Data Deficient (IUCN 3.1)

Scientific classification
- Kingdom: Plantae
- Clade: Tracheophytes
- Clade: Angiosperms
- Clade: Eudicots
- Clade: Rosids
- Order: Fagales
- Family: Fagaceae
- Genus: Quercus
- Subgenus: Quercus subg. Cerris
- Section: Quercus sect. Cyclobalanopsis
- Species: Q. gomeziana

Binomial name
- Quercus gomeziana A.Camus

Synonyms
- Cyclobalanopsis velutina Oerst.; Quercus velutina Lindl. ex Wall.; Quercus vestita Rehder & E.H.Wilson

Species of oak tree

Quercus gomeziana is a tree species in the beech family Fagaceae. There are no known subspecies. It is placed in subgenus Cerris, section Cyclobalanopsis (the ring-cupped oaks).

This oak tree grows in evergreen seasonal tropical forest, has large acorns in up to 50 mm cupules. and has been recorded from Vietnam (especially Lam Dong Province), where it may be called sồi Gomez.
