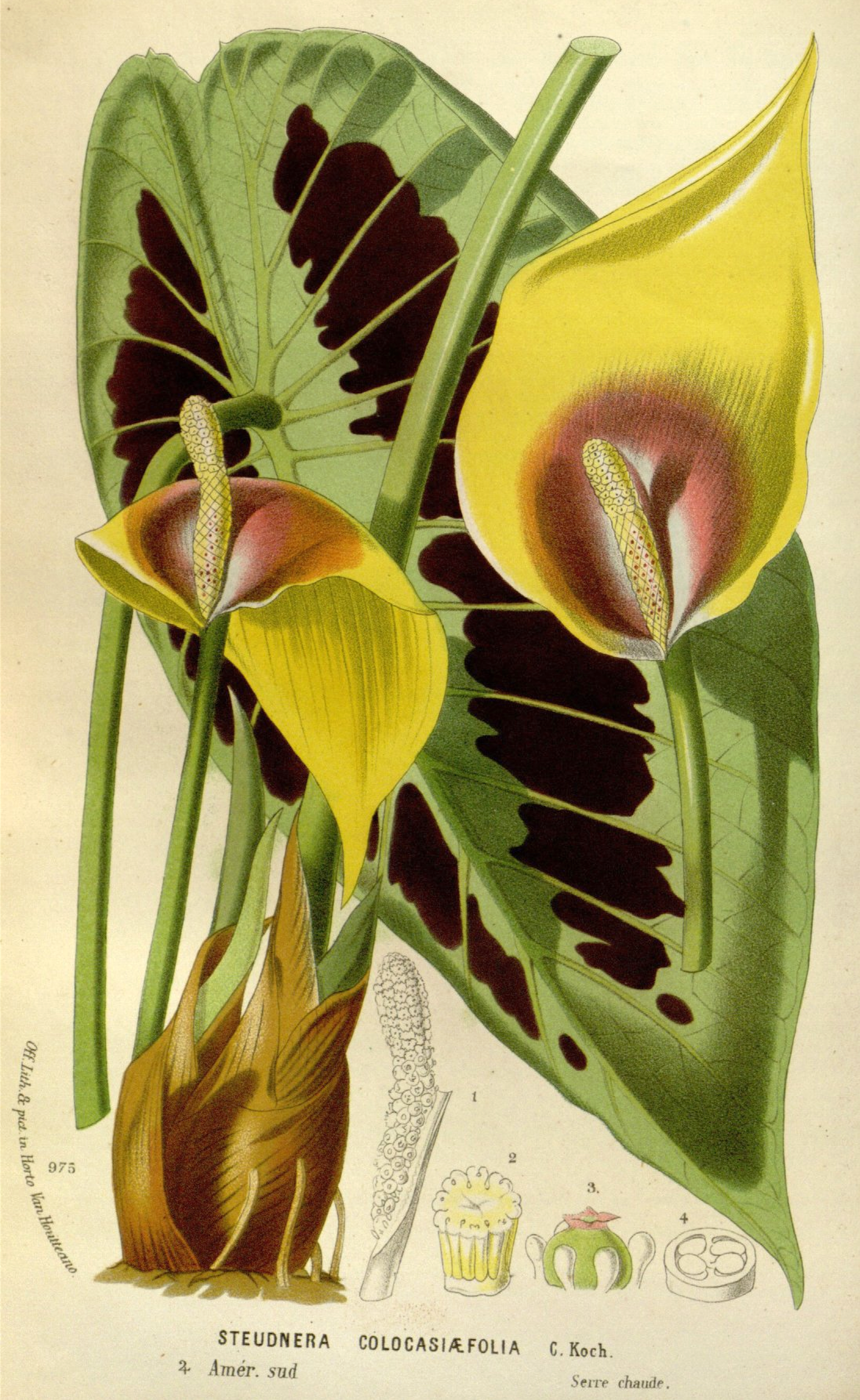
- Steudnera discolor

Scientific classification
- Kingdom: Plantae
- Clade: Tracheophytes
- Clade: Angiosperms
- Clade: Monocots
- Order: Alismatales
- Family: Araceae
- Subfamily: Aroideae
- Tribe: Colocasieae
- Genus: Steudnera; K.Koch
- Range of the genus Steudnera.

= Steudnera =

Genus of flowering plants

Steudnera is a genus of flowering plants in the family Araceae. It is native to southern China, the Himalayas, and Indochina. The genus was first described by Karl Koch in 1862. The genus is also believed to be closely related to Remusatia.

Species

- Steudnera assamica Hook.f. - Arunachal Pradesh, Assam
- Steudnera capitellata Hook.f. - Myanmar
- Steudnera colocasiifolia K.Koch - Yunnan, Guangxi, Assam, Bangladesh, Indochina
- Steudnera colocasioides Hook.f. - Assam, Bangladesh, East Himalaya, Myanmar
- Steudnera discolor W.Bull - Assam, Bangladesh, Myanmar, Thailand
- Steudnera gagei K.Krause - Assam, Bangladesh
- Steudnera griffithii (Schott) Hook.f. - Assam, Myanmar, Yunnan
- Steudnera henryana Engl. - Yunnan, Laos, Vietnam
- Steudnera kerrii Gagnep. - Guangxi, Laos, Vietnam, Thailand
- Steudnera virosa (Roxb.) Prain - Bangladesh, India
