= List of Philodendron species =

As of October 2025, Plants of the World Online accepted 627 species of Philodendron. It regards the genus Thaumatophyllum as a synonym of Philodendron, so placing species that some sources place in Thaumatophyllum in Philodendron.

== A ==
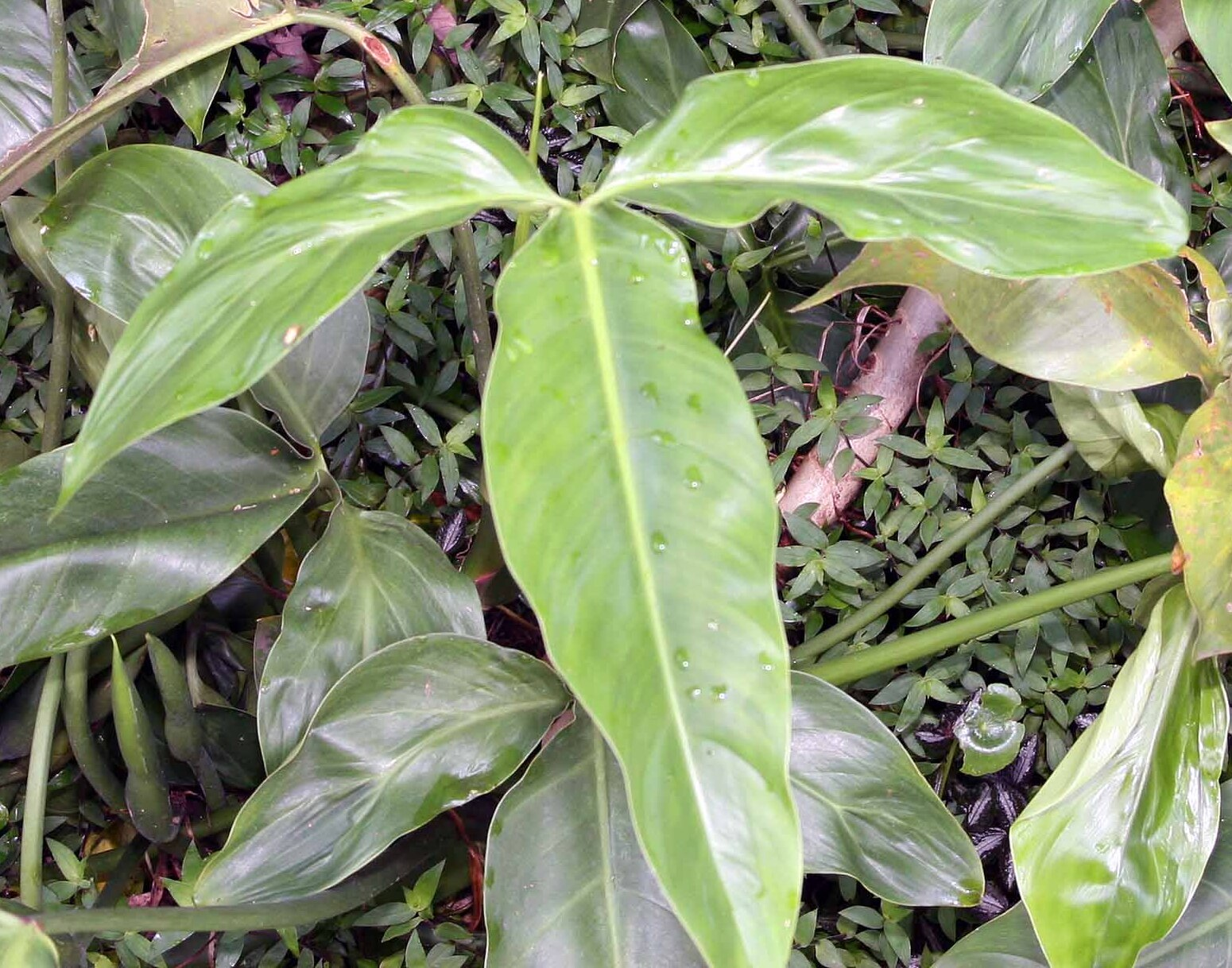
Philodendron anisotomum

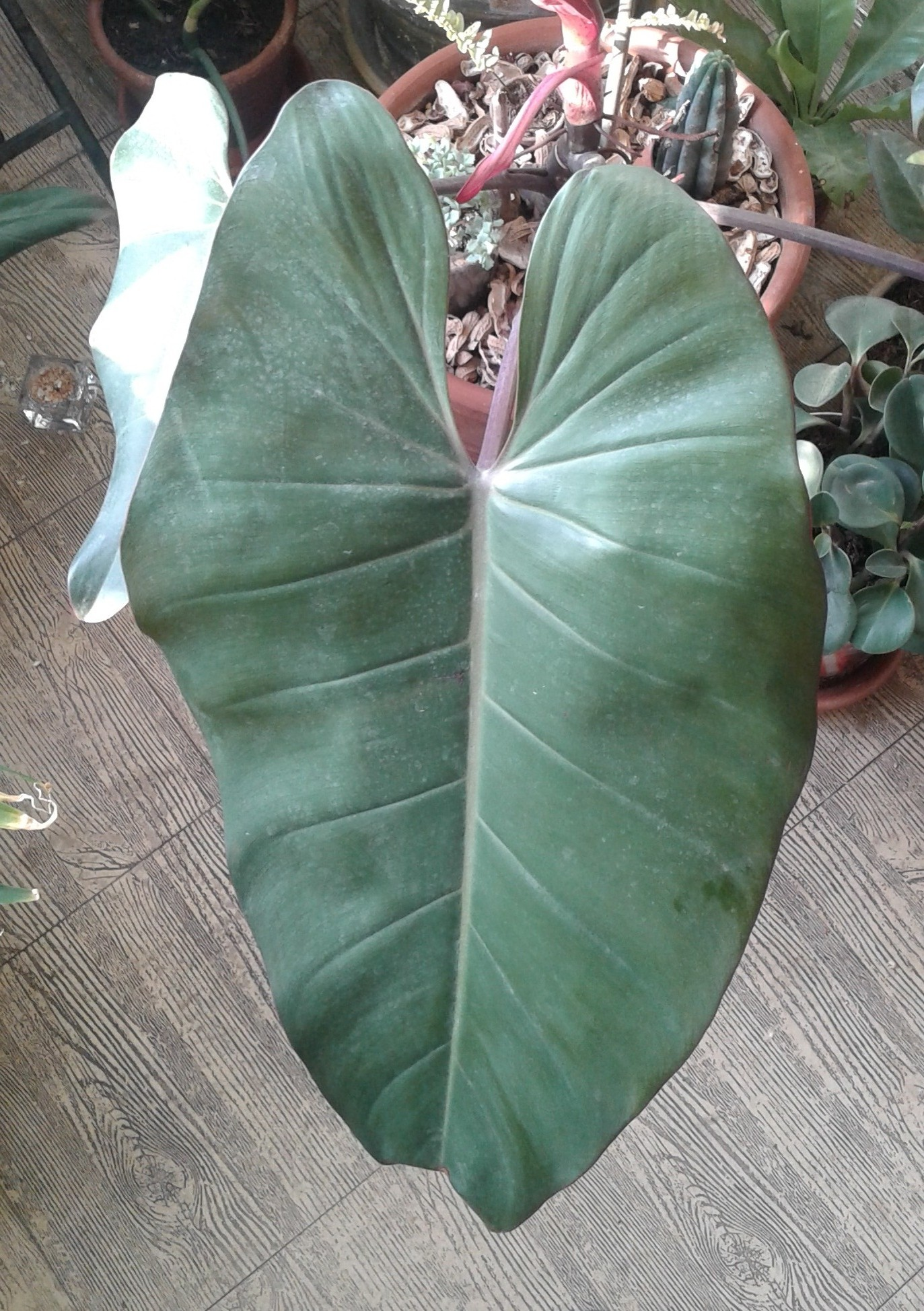
Philodendron appendiculatum

- Philodendron acreanum K.Krause – Brazil (Acre), Ecuador to Bolivia
- Philodendron acuminatissimum Engl. – Ecuador to Bolivia
- Philodendron acutifolium K.Krause – Ecuador to Peru
- Philodendron adamantinum Mart. ex Schott – Brazil (Minas Gerais)
- Philodendron adhatodifolium Schott – Venezuela
- Philodendron advena Schott – Mexico to Honduras
- Philodendron aemulum Schott – Brazil (E. Bahia: I. de Itaparica)
- Philodendron agudeloi Croat, Edwin Trujillo & Mines
- Philodendron alanbrantii Croat
- Philodendron alatisulcatum Croat
- Philodendron alatiundulatum Croat
- Philodendron alatum Poepp. – Peru
- Philodendron albisuccus Croat – Panama
- Philodendron alliodorum Croat & Grayum – Nicaragua to Ecuador
- Philodendron alonsoae Croat
- Philodendron alternans Schott – Brazil (Rio de Janeiro)
- Philodendron alticola Croat & Grayum – E. Costa Rica to W. Panama
- Philodendron altomacaense Nadruz & Mayo – Brazil (Rio de Janeiro)
- Philodendron amargalense Croat & M.M.Mora – Colombia (Chocó)
- Philodendron ampamii Croat – N. Peru
- Philodendron amplisinum G.S.Bunting – Venezuela (Zulia)
- Philodendron ampullaceum G.S.Bunting – N.W. Venezuela
- Philodendron anaadu G.S.Bunting – S. Venezuela
- Philodendron ancuashii Croat – N. Peru
- Philodendron angosturense Croat
- Philodendron angustialatum Engl. – Peru to Brazil (Acre)
- Philodendron angustilobum Croat & Grayum – Central America
- Philodendron angustisectum Engl. – Colombia to Bolivia
- Philodendron anisotomum Schott – Mexico to Central America
- Philodendron annulatum Croat – Panama
- Philodendron anthracyne Croat
- Philodendron antonioanum Croat – Central Panama
- Philodendron apiculatum Croat & M.M.Mora
- Philodendron appendiculatum Nadruz & Mayo – S.E. & S. Brazil
- Philodendron applanatum G.M.Barroso – Peru to N. Brazil
- Philodendron appunii G.S.Bunting – N. Venezuela
- Philodendron arbelaezii Croat & F.Cardona
- Philodendron arevaloi Croat
- Philodendron aristeguietae G.S.Bunting – N. Venezuela
- Philodendron aromaticum Croat & Grayum – Costa Rica
- Philodendron asplundii Croat & M.L.Soares – S. Tropical America
- Philodendron atabapoense G.S.Bunting – Venezuela (Amazonas)
- Philodendron atratum Croat
- Philodendron attenuatum Croat
- Philodendron aurantiifolium Schott – S.E. Mexico to Central America
- Philodendron aurantiispadix Croat – Colombia
- Philodendron aureimarginatum Croat – Peru (Loreto)
- Philodendron auriculatum Standl. & L.O.Williams – Costa Rica
- Philodendron auritum Lindl. – Guatemala
- Philodendron auyantepuiense G.S.Bunting – S. Venezuela to Guyana
- Philodendron avenium Grayum & Croat – N. Peru
- Philodendron ayalae Croat
- Philodendron ayangannense Croat
- Philodendron azulitense Croat – N.W. Venezuela

== B ==
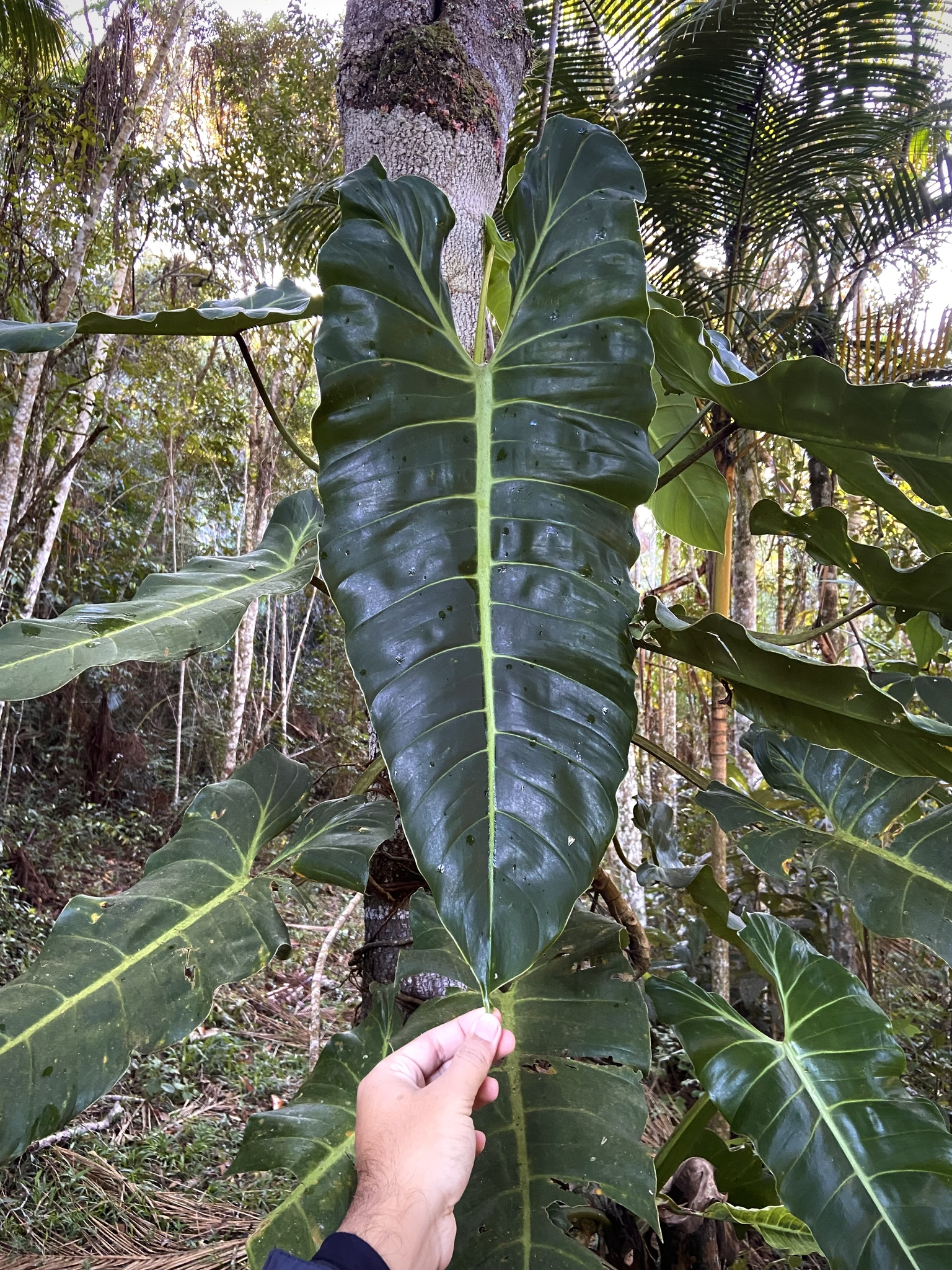
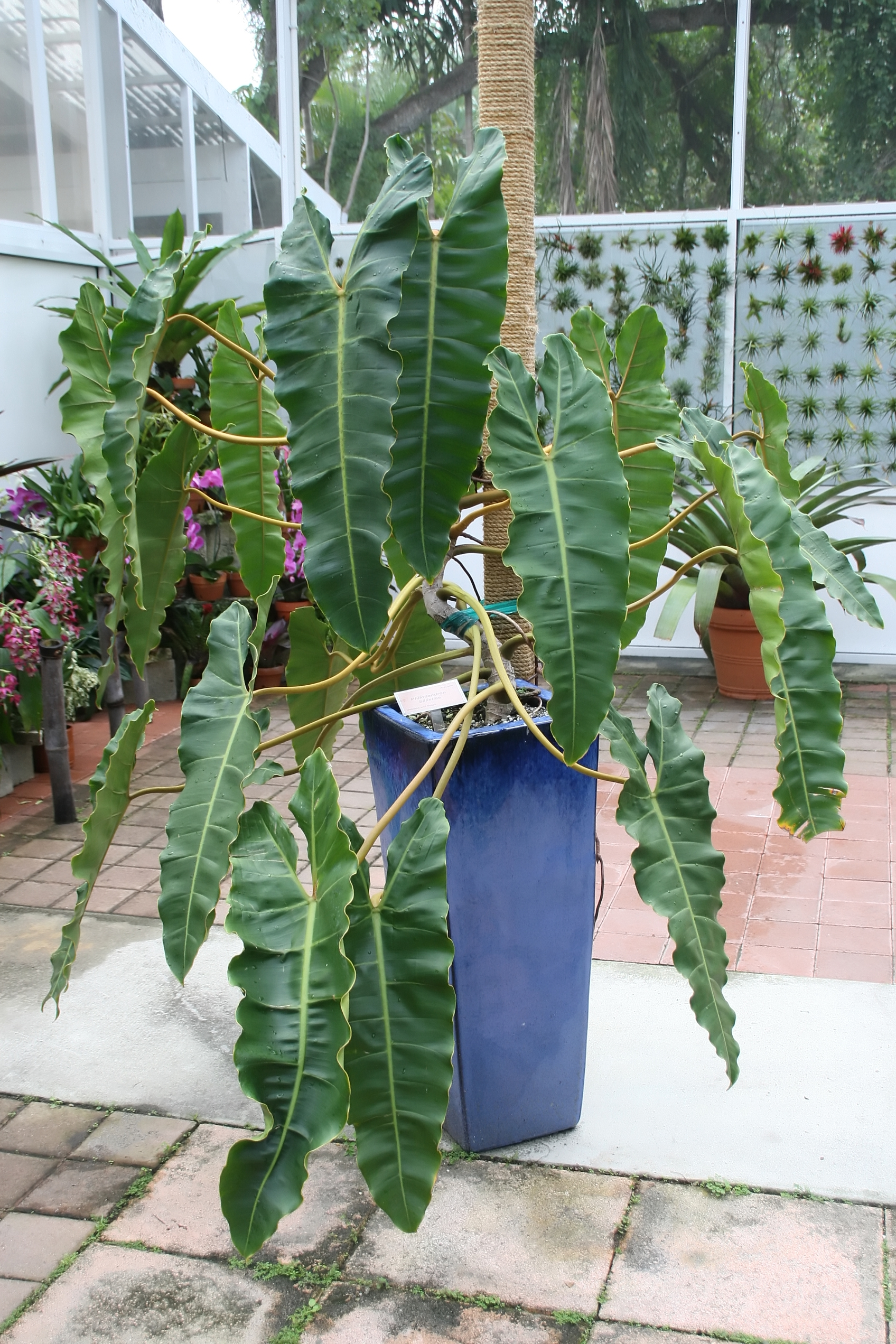
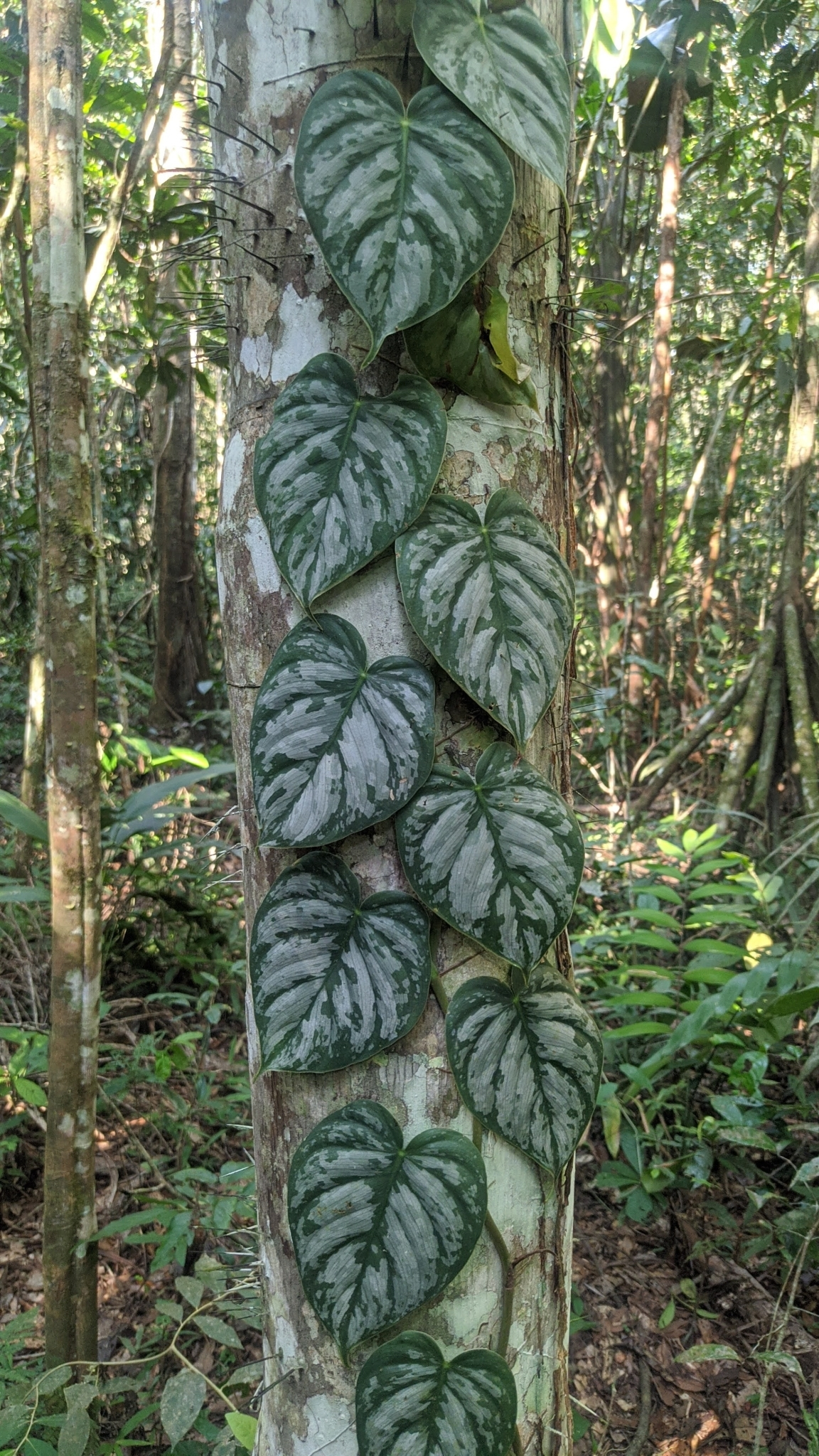
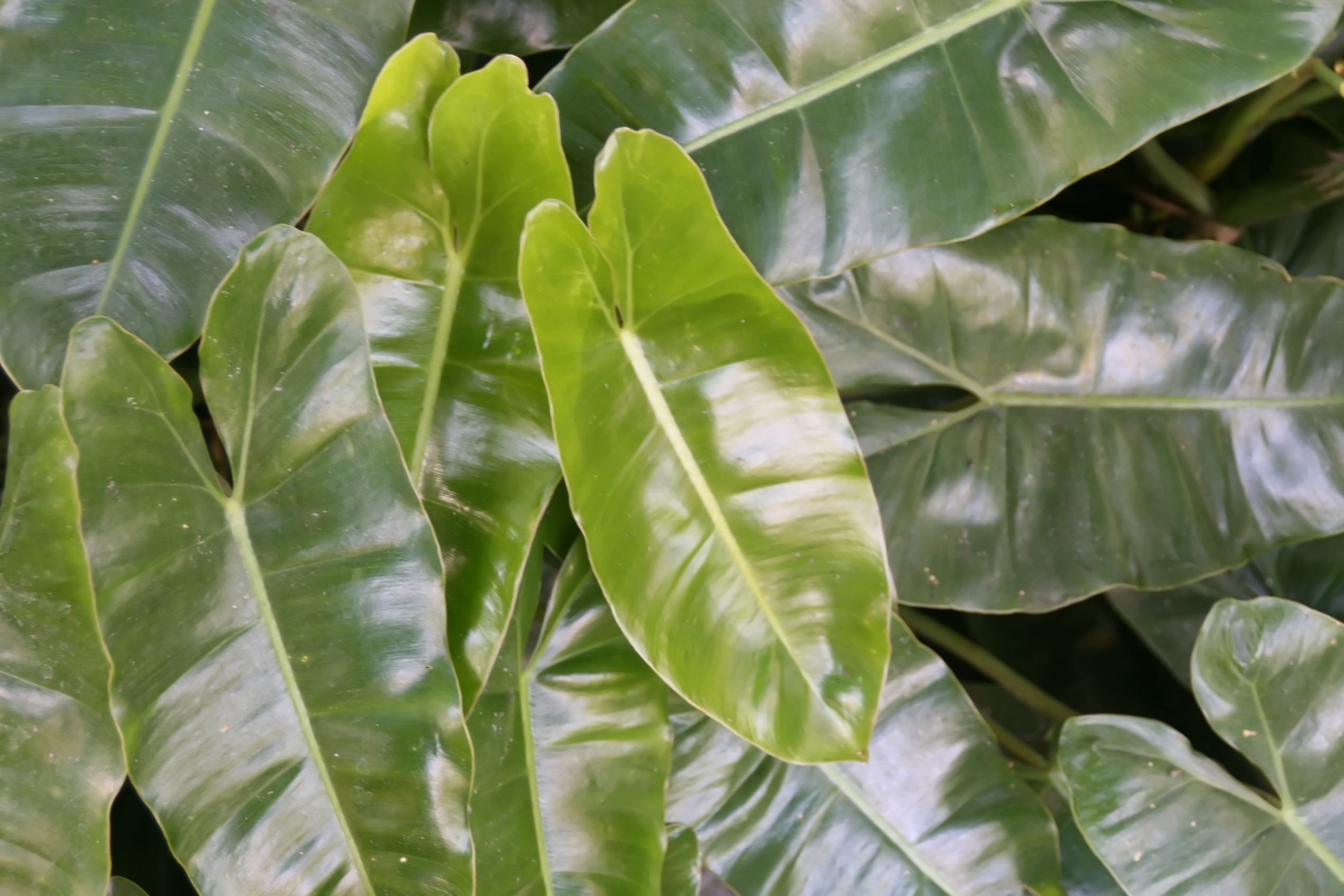
Philodendron bernardopazii (top left), Philodendron billietiae (top right), Philodendron brandtianum (bottom left), and Philodendron burle-marxii (bottom right).
- Philodendron bahiense Engl. – N.E. Brazil
- Philodendron bakeri Croat & Grayum – Nicaragua to Panama
- Philodendron balaoanum Engl. – Ecuador
- Philodendron barbourii Croat – N. Peru
- Philodendron barrosoanum G.S.Bunting – Venezuela to Peru
- Philodendron basivaginatum K.Krause – Peru
- Philodendron baudoense Croat & D.C.Bay – Colombia
- Philodendron bayae Croat
- Philodendron bazii Matuda – Mexico (Guerrero, Jalisco)
- Philodendron beniteziae Croat – N.W. Venezuela to Ecuador
- Philodendron bernardoi Croat
- Philodendron bernardopazii E.G.Gonç. – Brazil (Espírito Santo)
- Philodendron bethoweniae Croat
- Philodendron bicolor Croat, Scherber., M.M.Mora & G.Ferry
- Philodendron billietiae Croat – Guianas, Brazil (Pará)
- Philodendron bipennifolium Schott – S. Venezuela to N. & E. Brazil
- Philodendron bipinnatifidum Schott ex Endl. – S.E. & S. Brazil to N.E. Argentina
- Philodendron biribiriense Sakuragui & Mayo – Brazil (Minas Gerais: Serra de Espinhaço)
- Philodendron blanchetianum Schott – E. Brazil
- Philodendron bogotense Engl. – Colombia
- Philodendron bomboizense Croat & Cerón
- Philodendron bonifaziae Croat
- Philodendron borgesii G.S.Bunting – Venezuela (Táchira)
- Philodendron brandii Grayum – Colombia (Antioquia)
- Philodendron brandtianum K.Krause – N. Brazil, Bolivia
- Philodendron brantii Croat
- Philodendron brasiliense Engl. – S.E. Brazil
- Philodendron breedlovei Croat – Mexico (Chiapas)
- Philodendron brenesii Standl. – Costa Rica to Central Panama
- Philodendron brent-berlinii Croat – N. Peru
- Philodendron brevispathum Schott – Central & S. Tropical America
- Philodendron brewsterense Croat – Panama
- Philodendron brunneicaule Croat & Grayum – Costa Rica to Ecuador
- Philodendron bucayense Croat
- Philodendron buntingianum Croat – N.W. Venezuela
- Philodendron burgeri Grayum – Costa Rica to W. Panama
- Philodendron burle-marxii G.M.Barroso – Colombia to Ecuador and N. Brazil

== C ==
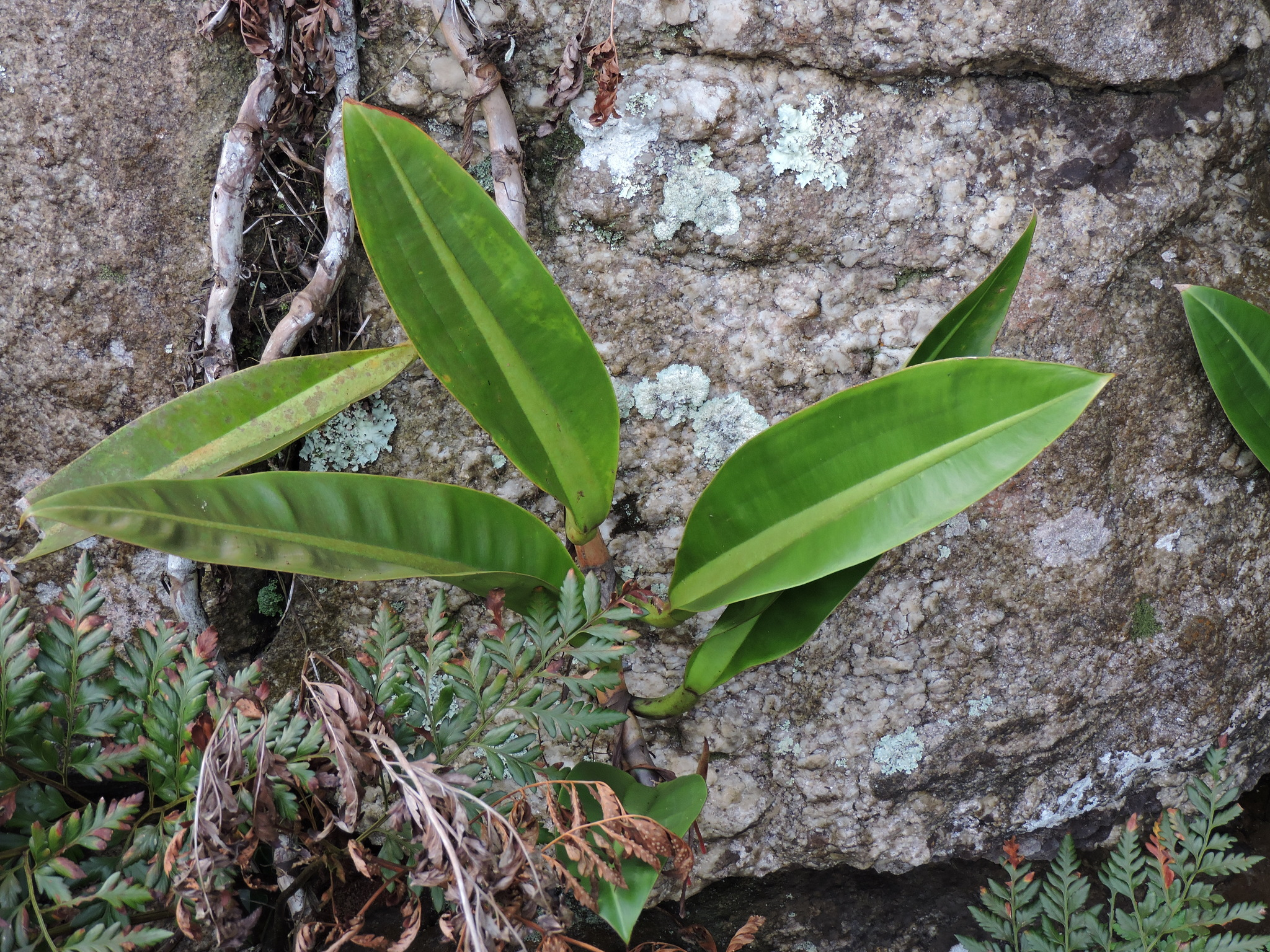
Philodendron crassinervium

- Philodendron calatheifolium G.S.Bunting – Venezuela (Táchira)
- Philodendron callosum K.Krause – N. South America to N. Brazil
- Philodendron camarae Croat
- Philodendron camiloanum (Croat) Croat
- Philodendron campii Croat – Colombia to Peru and N. Brazil
- Philodendron camposportoanum G.M.Barroso – S. Tropical America
- Philodendron canaimae G.S.Bunting – Venezuela (Bolívar)
- Philodendron candamoense Croat
- Philodendron canicaule Croat & D.C.Bay
- Philodendron caracaraiense Croat
- Philodendron carajasense E.G.Gonç. & A.J.Arruda
- Philodendron caranoense Croat, Edwin Trujillo & Marco Correa
- Philodendron cardonii Croat – Colombia
- Philodendron cardosoi E.G.Gonç. – Brazil (Pará)
- Philodendron carinatum E.G.Gonç. – Brazil (Amapá)
- Philodendron cataniapoense G.S.Bunting – S. Venezuela to Bolivia
- Philodendron caudatum K.Krause – Bolivia
- Philodendron cerrojefense M.M.Mora & Croat
- Philodendron chanchamayense Engl.
- Philodendron chepiganense O.Ortiz, Croat & Rodr.-Reyes
- Philodendron chimantae G.S.Bunting – Colombia to S. Venezuela
- Philodendron chimboanum Engl. – Ecuador
- Philodendron chiriquense Croat – Panama
- Philodendron chirripoense Croat & Grayum – S. Costa Rica
- Philodendron chrysocarpum Croat & D.C.Bay – Colombia
- Philodendron cipoense Sakuragui & Mayo – Brazil (Minas Gerais: Serra de Espinhaço)
- Philodendron clarkei Croat – Ecuador (Esmeraldas)
- Philodendron clewellii Croat – Panama (Sierranía de Pirre)
- Philodendron coibense Croat & O.Ortiz
- Philodendron colombianum R.E.Schult. – Colombia to N. Peru
- Philodendron coloradense Croat – Panama (Chiriquí)
- Philodendron condorcanquense Croat – N. Peru
- Philodendron conforme G.S.Bunting – Venezuela (Amazonas)
- Philodendron consanguineum Schott – Caribbean
- Philodendron consobrinum G.S.Bunting – Venezuela (Táchira)
- Philodendron copense Croat – Panama
- Philodendron corcovadense Kunth – E. & S. Brazil
- Philodendron cordatum Kunth ex Schott – S.E. Brazil (Rio de Janeiro to São Paulo)
- Philodendron coriaceum Croat & D.C.Bay – Colombia to Ecuador
- Philodendron correae Croat – W. Panama
- Philodendron cotapatense Croat & Acebey – Bolivia
- Philodendron cotobrusense Croat & Grayum – E. Costa Rica
- Philodendron cotonense Croat & Grayum – E. Costa Rica to W. Panama
- Philodendron craspedodromum R.E.Schult. – Colombia
- Philodendron crassinervium Lindl. – S.E. Brazil (to Paraná)
- Philodendron crassispathum Croat & Grayum – Central Costa Rica to W. Panama
- Philodendron crassum Rendle – Brazil (Rio de Janeiro)
- Philodendron cremersii Croat & Grayum – French Guiana
- Philodendron cretosum Croat & Grayum – Costa Rica to Panama
- Philodendron croatii Grayum – Panama
- Philodendron cruentospathum Madison – Ecuador
- Philodendron cruentum Poepp. – Peru
- Philodendron crystallum Croat & Edwin Trujillo
- Philodendron cuangosense Croat
- Philodendron cuneatum Engl. – Colombia to N. Peru
- Philodendron curvilobum Schott – S.E. Brazil
- Philodendron curvipetiolatum Croat

== D ==
- Philodendron dalyi Croat
- Philodendron danielii Croat & Oberle – Colombia (Antioquia)
- Philodendron danteanum G.S.Bunting – N. Venezuela
- Philodendron dardanianum Mayo – Brazil (Bahia, Goiás)
- Philodendron darienense O.Ortiz, Croat & Rodr.-Reyes
- Philodendron davidneillii Croat
- Philodendron davidsei G.S.Bunting – Venezuela (Zulia)
- Philodendron davidsonii Croat – Costa Rica to W. Panama
- Philodendron deflexum Poepp. ex Schott – Peru
- Philodendron delannayi Croat
- Philodendron delascioi G.S.Bunting – E. Venezuela
- Philodendron delgadoae Croat & Delannay
- Philodendron delinksii Croat & Köster – Ecuador
- Philodendron deltoideum Poepp. – Peru
- Philodendron densivenium Engl. – Peru
- Philodendron devansayeanum André – Peru
- Philodendron devianum Croat – Colombia
- Philodendron dioscoreoides Gleason – Guianas
- Philodendron discretivenium Croat & D.C.Bay – Colombia
- Philodendron distantilobum K.Krause – Peru to N. Brazil
- Philodendron divaricatum K.Krause – Peru to Bolivia
- Philodendron dodsonii Croat & Grayum – Costa Rica to Ecuador
- Philodendron dolichophyllum Croat – Panama
- Philodendron dominicalense Croat & Grayum – S.W. Costa Rica
- Philodendron dressleri G.S.Bunting – Mexico (Marias Islands, Sinaloa, Nayarit)
- Philodendron dryanderae Croat & D.C.Bay – Colombia
- Philodendron duckei Croat & Grayum – Guianas, N. Brazil
- Philodendron dunstervilleorum G.S.Bunting – S. Venezuela to N. Brazil
- Philodendron dussii Engl. – Dominica, Martinique
- Philodendron dwyeri Croat – Belize
- Philodendron dyscarpium R.E.Schult. – Colombia to S. Venezuela

== E ==
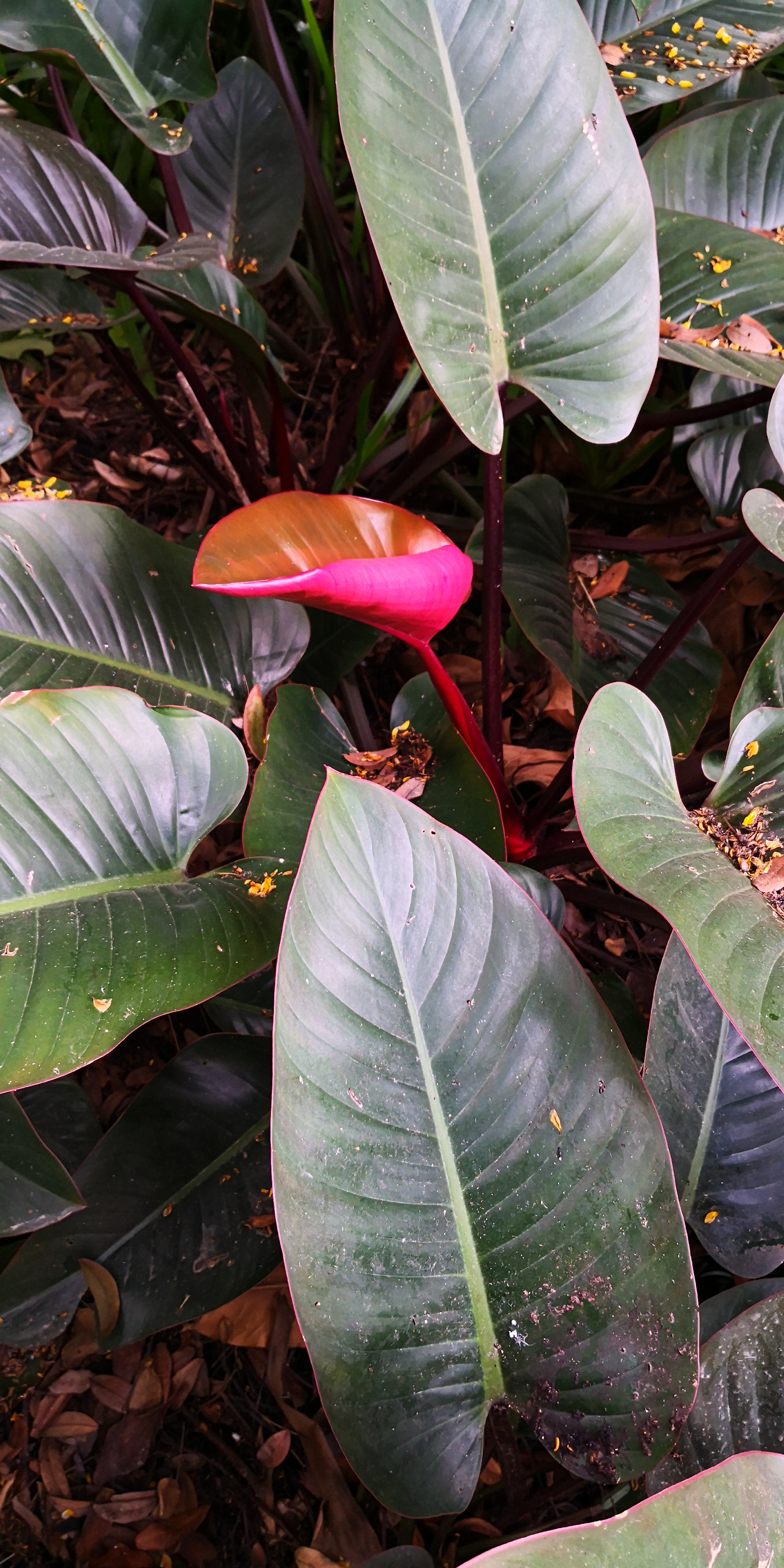
Philodendron erubescens

- Philodendron eburneum K.Krause – Ecuador
- Philodendron ecordatum Schott – Guianas, N. Brazil
- Philodendron edenudatum Croat – Panama
- Philodendron edmundoi G.M.Barroso – Brazil (Espírito Santo, Rio de Janeiro)
- Philodendron edwinii Croat & Marco Correa
- Philodendron effusilobum Croat – Venezuela
- Philodendron elaphoglossoides Schott – N. Brazil to Peru
- Philodendron elegans K.Krause – Colombia
- Philodendron elegantulum Croat & Grayum – Panama
- Philodendron englerianum Steyerm. – S. Venezuela to Guyana
- Philodendron ensifolium Croat & Grayum – Costa Rica to Colombia
- Philodendron ernestii Engl. – N. Brazil, Ecuador to Bolivia
- Philodendron erubescens K.Koch & Augustin – Colombia
- Philodendron escuintlense Matuda – Mexico
- Philodendron esmeraldense Croat
- Philodendron exile G.S.Bunting – S. Tropical America
- Philodendron eximium Schott – E. Brazil

== F ==
- Philodendron fasciculatum Croat
- Philodendron fendleri K.Krause – Trinidad to Venezuela
- Philodendron ferrugineum Croat – Panama
- Philodendron fibraecataphyllum M.M.Mora & Croat
- Philodendron fibrillosum Poepp. – Peru
- Philodendron fibrosum Sodiro ex Croat – Colombia to Ecuador
- Philodendron findens Croat & Grayum – Costa Rica to Panama
- Philodendron florianetlii Croat & Grayum
- Philodendron flumineum E.G.Gonç. – Brazil (Goiás, Brasília D.F.)
- Philodendron follii Nadruz – Brazil (Espírito Santo)
- Philodendron folsomii Croat – Panama
- Philodendron fortunense Croat – Panama (Chiriquí)
- Philodendron fosteri Croat
- Philodendron fragile Nadruz & Mayo – Brazil (Rio de Janeiro)
- Philodendron fragrantissimum (Hook.) G.Don – Tropical America
- Philodendron fraternum Schott – Venezuela
- Philodendron furcatum Croat & D.C.Bay – Colombia

== G ==
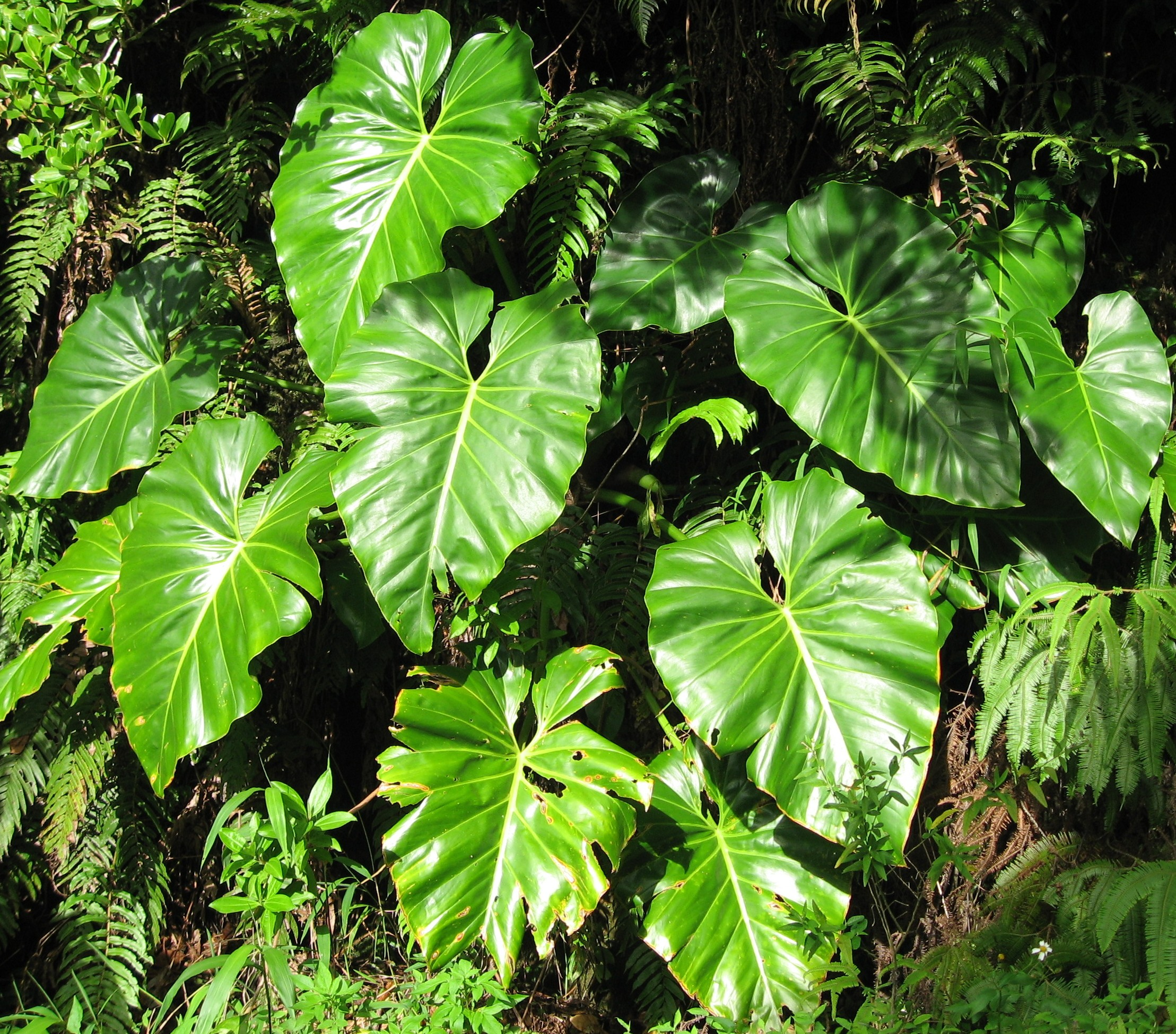
Philodendron giganteum

- Philodendron galotipazii Croat
- Philodendron gardeniodorum Croat, D.P.Hannon & Delannay
- Philodendron genevieveanum Croat
- Philodendron geniculatum Bogner & Croat
- Philodendron gentryi Croat
- Philodendron giganteum Schott – Caribbean to Brazil (Pará)
- Philodendron gigas Croat – Panama
- Philodendron glanduliferum Matuda – Mexico (Oaxaca), Guatemala, Venezuela
- Philodendron glaziovii Hook.f. – Brazil (Rio de Janeiro)
- Philodendron gloriosum André – Colombia
- Philodendron goeldii G.M.Barroso – S. Tropical America
- Philodendron gonzalezii Grayum – W. Venezuela
- Philodendron grahamii Croat
- Philodendron grandifolium (Jacq.) Schott – N. South America
- Philodendron grandipes K.Krause – S.E. Nicaragua to Ecuador
- Philodendron granulare Croat – Panama (Darién)
- Philodendron graveolens Engl. – Colombia
- Philodendron grayumii Croat – Costa Rica to Central Panama
- Philodendron grazielae G.S.Bunting – Peru to N. Brazil
- Philodendron grenandii Croat – French Guiana
- Philodendron gribianum Croat
- Philodendron guadalupense Croat
- Philodendron guadarramanum Diaz Jim., Croat & Aguilar-Rodr.
- Philodendron guaiquinimae G.S.Bunting – Venezuela (Bolívar)
- Philodendron gualeanum Engl. – Ecuador
- Philodendron guasagandense Croat
- Philodendron guianense Croat & Grayum – Guianas, N. Brazil
- Philodendron guizaense Croat
- Philodendron guttiferum Kunth – S. Tropical America

== H ==
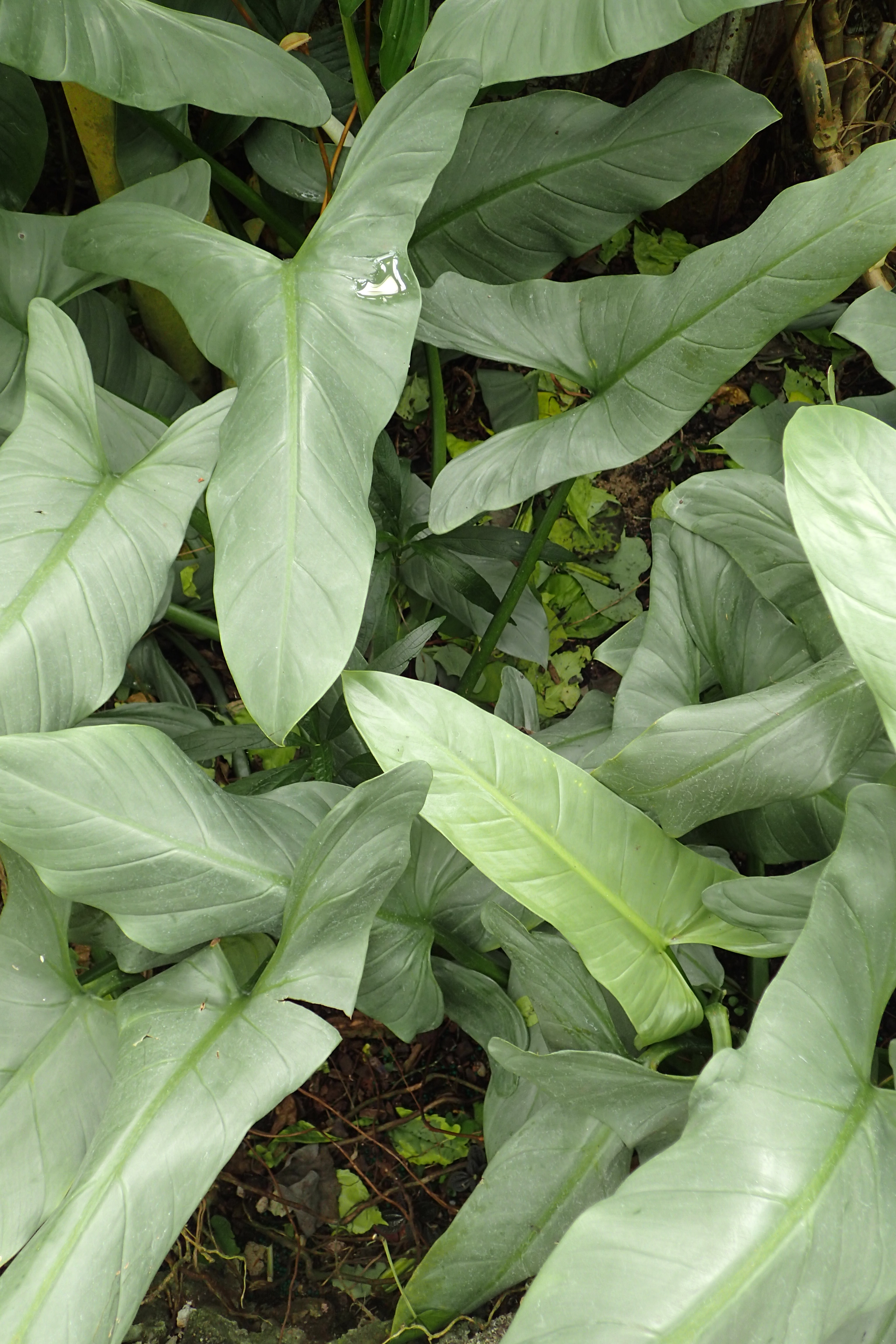
Philodendron hastatum

- Philodendron hammelii Croat – Panama (Coclé)
- Philodendron hannoniae Croat
- Philodendron hastatum K.Koch & Sello – S.E. Brazil
- Philodendron hatschbachii Nadruz & Mayo – Brazil (Espírito Santo, Rio de Janeiro)
- Philodendron hebetatum Croat – Panama to Ecuador
- Philodendron hederaceum (Jacq.) Schott – Mexico to Tropical America
- Philodendron heleniae Croat – Panama to W. South America
- Philodendron henry-pittieri G.S.Bunting – N.W. & N. Venezuela
- Philodendron herbaceum Croat & Grayum – Costa Rica to Ecuador
- Philodendron herthae K.Krause – Ecuador to Peru
- Philodendron heterocraspedon Croat & D.C.Bay – Colombia
- Philodendron heterophyllum Poepp. – W. South America
- Philodendron heteropleurum K.Krause – Ecuador to Peru
- Philodendron holstii G.S.Bunting – Venezuela (Amazonas)
- Philodendron holtonianum Schott
- Philodendron hooveri Croat & Grayum – Ecuador
- Philodendron hopkinsianum M.L.Soares & Mayo – N. Brazil
- Philodendron houlletianum Engl. – French Guiana
- Philodendron huanucense Engl. – Peru
- Philodendron huashikatii Croat – N. Peru
- Philodendron huaynacapacense Croat – Peru to Bolivia
- Philodendron hughclarkei Croat
- Philodendron humile E.G.Gonç. – W. Brazil
- Philodendron hyalinum Croat
- Philodendron hylaeae G.S.Bunting – S. Tropical America

== I–J ==
- Philodendron ichthyoderma Croat & Grayum – Panama to Colombia
- Philodendron imbe Schott ex Kunth
- Philodendron immixtum Croat – Panama to Colombia
- Philodendron inaequilaterum Liebm. – Mexico to Bolivia
- Philodendron inconcinnum Schott – Venezuela
- Philodendron inops Schott – Brazil (Rio de Janeiro to São Paulo)
- Philodendron insigne Schott – S. Tropical America
- Philodendron ishichimiense Croat
- Philodendron jacquinii Schott – Mexico to N. South America, W. Cuba, Cayman Islands
- Philodendron jefense Croat – Panama (Panamá)
- Philodendron jimenae Croat
- Philodendron joaosilvae Croat, A.Cardoso & Moonen
- Philodendron jodavisianum G.S.Bunting – S.E. Mexico to N.W. Venezuela
- Philodendron × joepii Croat – French Guiana
- Philodendron jonkerorum Croat – Suriname
- Philodendron josefinense Croat
- Philodendron josephii C.A.S.Bat. & M.L.Soares
- Philodendron juninense Engl. – Peru

== K–L ==
- Philodendron kaieteurense Croat
- Philodendron kautskyi G.S.Bunting – Brazil (Espírito Santo)
- Philodendron killipii K.Krause – Peru
- Philodendron knappiae Croat – Costa Rica to W. Panama
- Philodendron krauseanum Steyerm. – N. South America
- Philodendron kressii Croat
- Philodendron kroemeri Croat – Bolivia
- Philodendron krugii Engl. – Tobago to Venezuela
- Philodendron lacerum (Jacq.) Schott – Greater Antilles
- Philodendron laticiferum Croat & M.M.Mora – Colombia (Chocó)
- Philodendron latifolium K.Koch – Venezuela
- Philodendron lazorii Croat – Panama
- Philodendron leal-costae Mayo & G.M.Barroso – N.E. Brazil
- Philodendron lechlerianum Schott – Peru to Bolivia
- Philodendron lehmannii Engl. – Colombia
- Philodendron lemae G.S.Bunting – Venezuela (Bolívar)
- Philodendron lemorae Croat
- Philodendron lentii Croat & Grayum – S.E. Nicaragua to N.W. Ecuador
- Philodendron leucanthum K.Krause – Peru to N. Brazil
- Philodendron leyvae García-Barr. – Colombia
- Philodendron liesneri G.S.Bunting – Venezuela (Amazonas)
- Philodendron ligulatum Schott – Nicaragua to Colombia
- Philodendron lindenianum Wallis – Ecuador
- Philodendron lindenii Schott – Colombia to Venezuela
- Philodendron linganii Croat
- Philodendron linguifolium Schott – N. Brazil
- Philodendron lingulatum (L.) K.Koch – Caribbean
- Philodendron linnaei Kunth – S. Tropical America
- Philodendron llanense Croat – Panama
- Philodendron loefgrenii Engl. – Brazil (São Paulo to Santa Catarina)
- Philodendron longilaminatum Schott – Brazil (Pernambuco, Bahia)
- Philodendron longilobatum Sakur. – Brazil (Espírito Santo)
- Philodendron longilobum M.M.Mora & Croat
- Philodendron longipedunculatum Croat & M.M.Mora – Colombia (Chocó)
- Philodendron longipes Engl. – Colombia
- Philodendron longirrhizum M.M.Mora & Croat – Colombia to Venezuela
- Philodendron longistilum K.Krause – Peru to N. Brazil
- Philodendron × lucasiorum Croat & Moonen
- Philodendron luisae Calazans
- Philodendron lundii Warm. – Brazil (Goiás to Bahia)
- Philodendron lupinum E.G.Gonç. & J.B.Carvalho – Brazil (Acre)
- Philodendron luteonervium Croat
- Philodendron luxurians Croat, D.P.Hannon & R.Kaufmann
- Philodendron lynnhannoniae Croat

== M ==
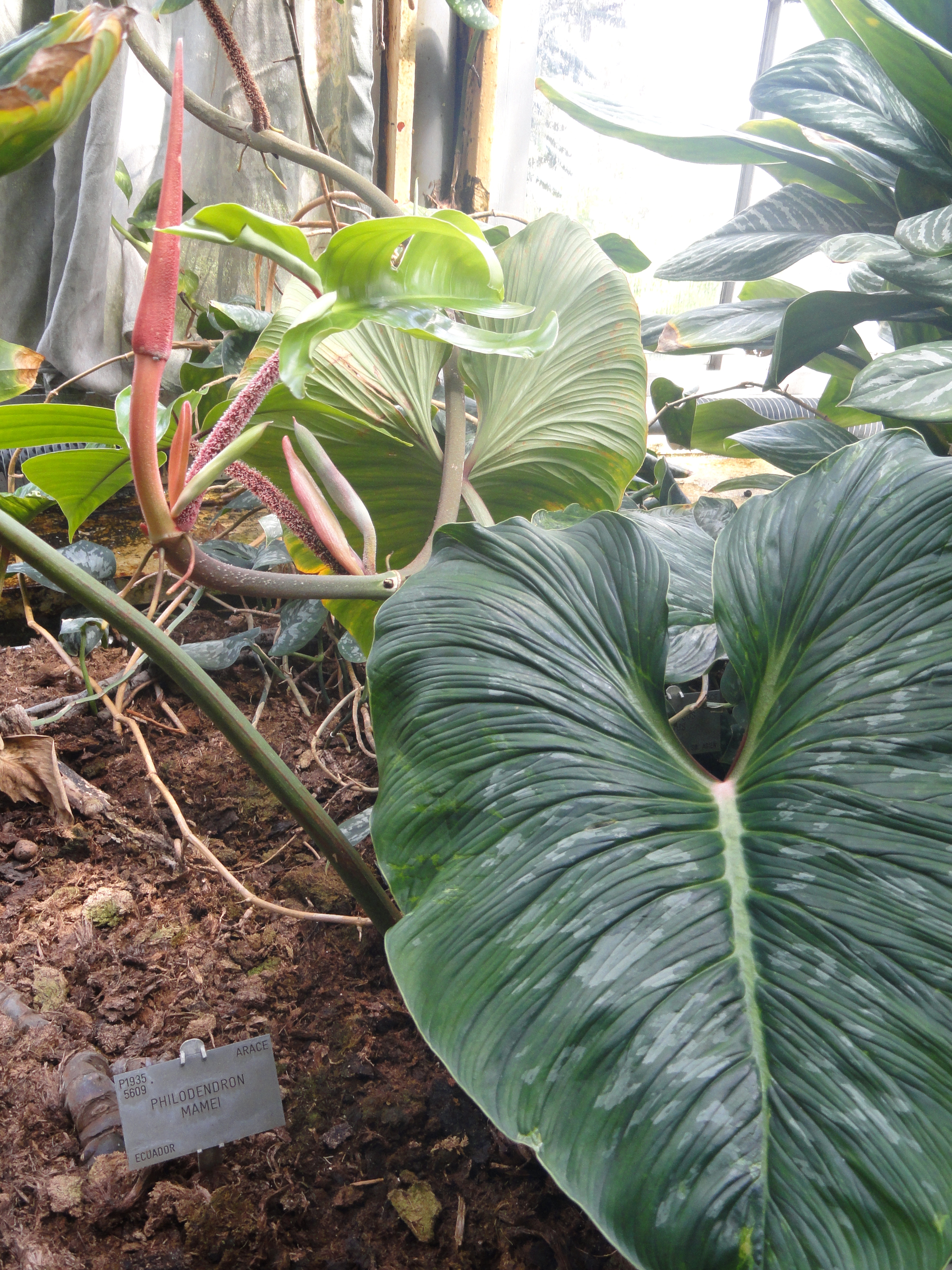
Philodendron mamei

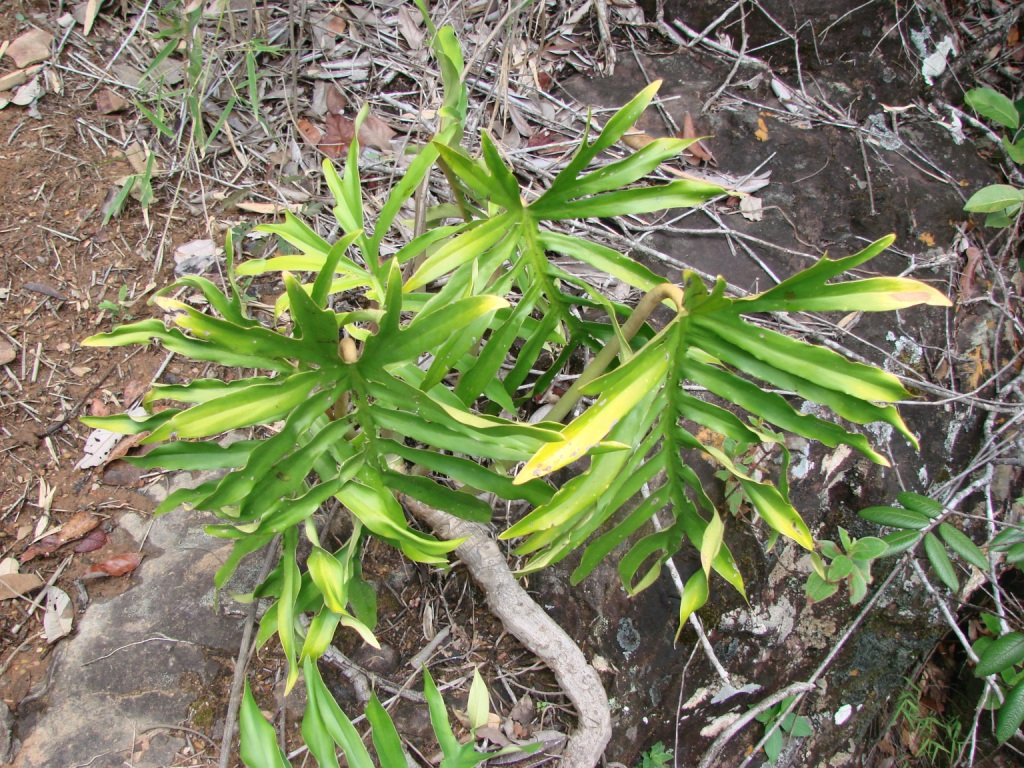
Philodendron mayoi

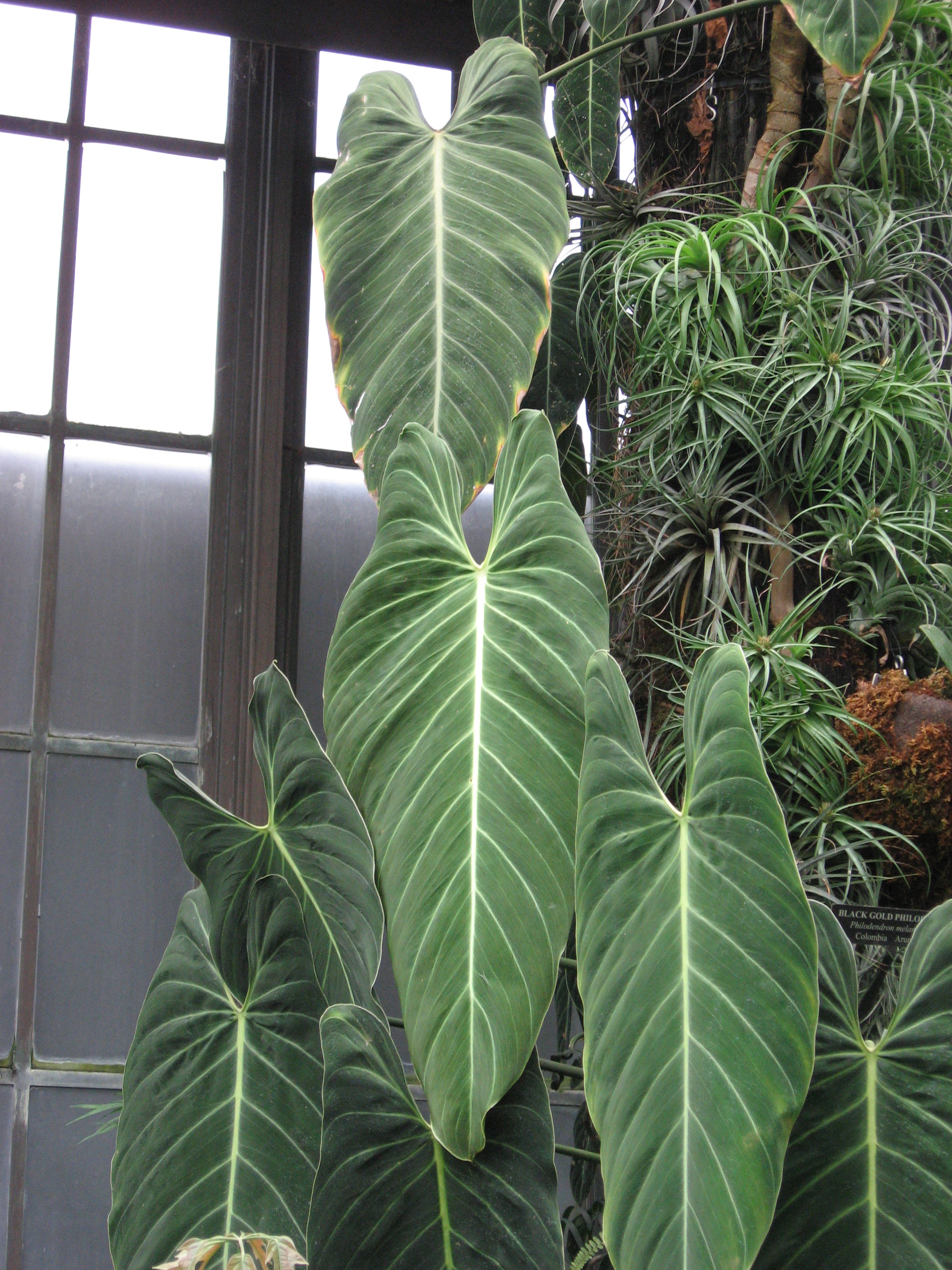
Philodendron melanochrysum

- Philodendron macarenense Croat
- Philodendron macroglossum Schott – Venezuela
- Philodendron macropodum K.Krause – Brazil (Roraima)
- Philodendron maculatum K.Krause – Peru to N. Brazil
- Philodendron madalenense J.Mattos, Nadruz & Baumgratz
- Philodendron madronense Croat
- Philodendron magnum Croat* Philodendron maguirei G.S.Bunting – Venezuela (Amazonas)
- Philodendron malesevichiae Croat – Panama to Colombia
- Philodendron mamei André – S. Ecuador
- Philodendron mansellii Croat
- Philodendron manuelii Croat
- Philodendron marahuacae G.S.Bunting – Venezuela (Amazonas)
- Philodendron marcarlsoniae Croat
- Philodendron marcocorreanum Croat, M.M.Mora & Edwin Trujillo
- Philodendron maroae G.S.Bunting – Venezuela (Amazonas)
- Philodendron martianum Engl. – E. & S. Brazil
- Philodendron martinezii Croat & O.Ortiz
- Philodendron martini Schott – French Guiana
- Philodendron mashpiense Croat
- Philodendron mathewsii Schott – Peru
- Philodendron mawarinumae G.S.Bunting – S. Venezuela to French Guiana
- Philodendron maximum K.Krause – Brazil (Acre, Mato Grosso), Ecuador to Bolivia
- Philodendron mayoi E.G.Gonç. – Brazil (Brasília D.F., Goiás)
- Philodendron mazorcalense Croat
- Philodendron mcphersonii Croat – Colombia
- Philodendron megalophyllum Schott – Trinidad to S. Tropical America
- Philodendron meieri Croat
- Philodendron melanochrysum Linden & André – Colombia
- Philodendron melanoneuron Croat
- Philodendron melanum Croat
- Philodendron melinonii Brongn. ex Regel – N. South America to N. Brazil
- Philodendron mello-barretoanum Burle-Marx ex G.M.Barroso – Central Brazil to Bolivia
- Philodendron melloi Irume & M.L.Soares
- Philodendron membranaceum Poepp. – Peru
- Philodendron mendozae Croat
- Philodendron mentiens Croat & Delannay
- Philodendron meraense Croat
- Philodendron merenbergense Croat – Colombia
- Philodendron meridense G.S.Bunting – N.W. Venezuela
- Philodendron meridionale Buturi & Sakur.
- Philodendron merizaldense Croat
- Philodendron mesae G.S.Bunting – Venezuela (Mérida)
- Philodendron mesayense Croat
- Philodendron mexicanum Engl. – Mexico to Central America
- Philodendron micranthum Poepp. ex Schott – N. Brazil, Ecuador, Peru
- Philodendron microstictum Standl. & L.O.Williams – Costa Rica
- Philodendron millerianum Nadruz & Sakur. – Brazil (Rio de Janeiro)
- Philodendron minarum Engl. – Brazil (Minas Gerais, São Paulo)
- Philodendron minesianum Croat
- Philodendron misahualliense Croat & Cerón – Ecuador
- Philodendron missionum (Hauman) Hauman – S. Brazil to N.E. Argentina
- Philodendron modestum Schott – Venezuela
- Philodendron monroi Croat & O.Ortiz
- Philodendron monsalveae Croat & D.C.Bay – Colombia
- Philodendron montanum Engl. – Colombia
- Philodendron monteagudoi Croat
- Philodendron montemariense Croat, J.J.Percy & Carrascal
- Philodendron moonenii Croat – French Guiana
- Philodendron morii Croat – Panama
- Philodendron multinervum G.S.Bunting – Venezuela (Amazonas)
- Philodendron multispadiceum Engl. – Colombia
- Philodendron muricatum Schott – N. South America to Brazil
- Philodendron musifolium Engl. – Ecuador
- Philodendron myrmecophilum Engl. – N. & W. Central Brazil

== N–O ==
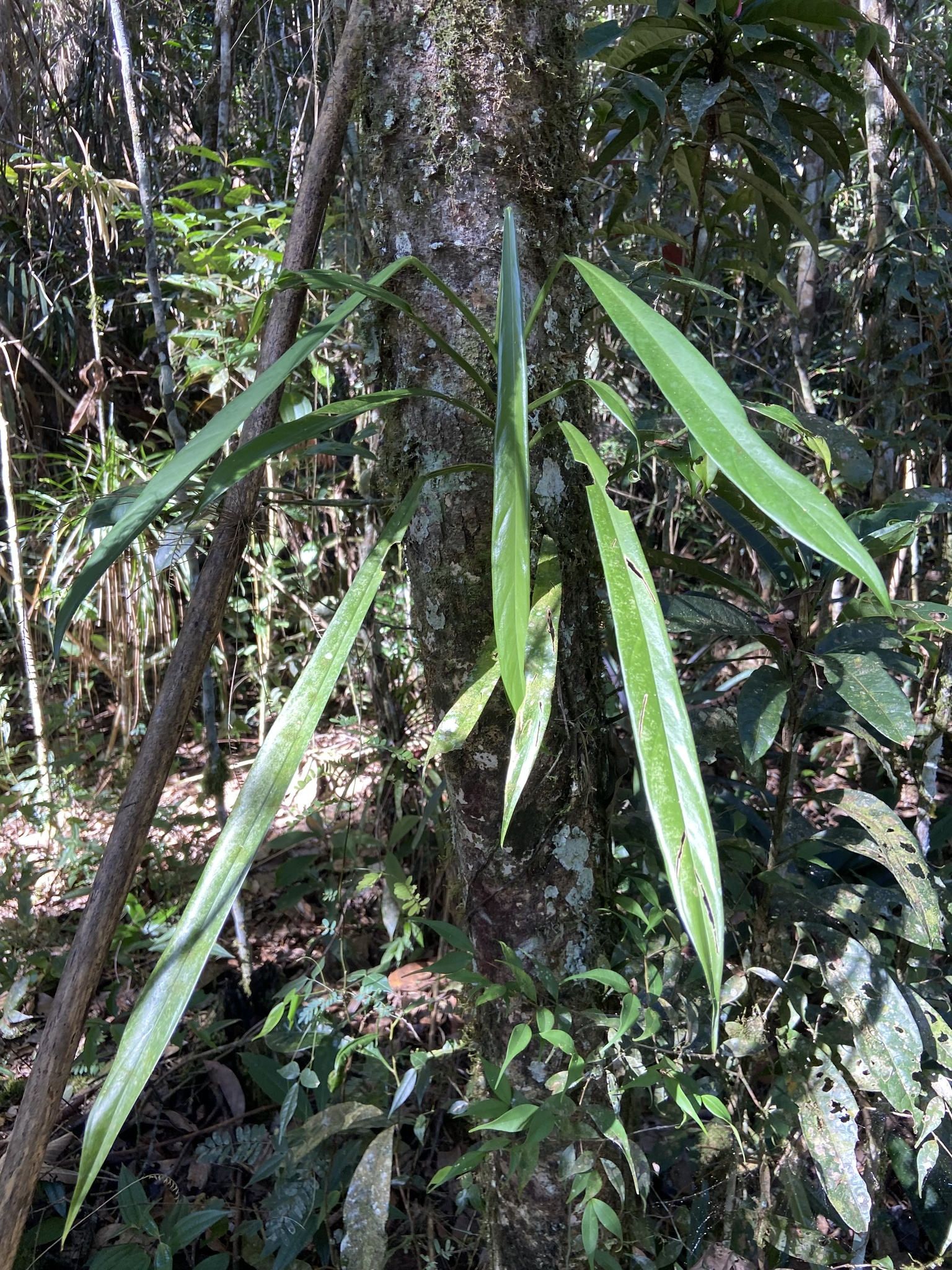
Philodendron oblongum

- Philodendron nadruzianum Sakur. – Brazil (Rio de Janeiro)
- Philodendron nanegalense Engl. – Ecuador
- Philodendron nangaritense Croat
- Philodendron narinoense Croat – Colombia to Ecuador
- Philodendron narvaezii Croat
- Philodendron nebulense G.S.Bunting – Venezuela (Amazonas)
- Philodendron neglectum
- Philodendron nelsonzamorae Croat & Grayum
- Philodendron nievense Croat
- Philodendron nigrifactum Croat
- Philodendron ninoanum Croat & D.C.Bay – Colombia
- Philodendron niqueanum Croat – Panama (Darién)
- Philodendron noelii Grayum
- Philodendron nullinervium E.G.Gonç. – Brazil (Acre, Amazonas)
- Philodendron oblanceolatum Croat & D.C.Bay – Colombia
- Philodendron obliquifolium Engl. – Brazil (Rio de Janeiro to N.E. Santa Catarina)
- Philodendron oblongum (Vell.) Kunth – E. Brazil
- Philodendron obtusilobum Miq. – Venezuela
- Philodendron ochrostemon Schott – Brazil
- Philodendron oligospermum Engl. – S. Colombia to Ecuador
- Philodendron opacum Croat & Grayum – S.E. Nicaragua to Ecuador
- Philodendron orionis G.S.Bunting – N.W. Venezuela
- Philodendron ornatum Schott – Trinidad-Tobago to S. Tropical America
- Philodendron ovatoluteum Croat
- Philodendron oxycataphyllum Croat

== P ==
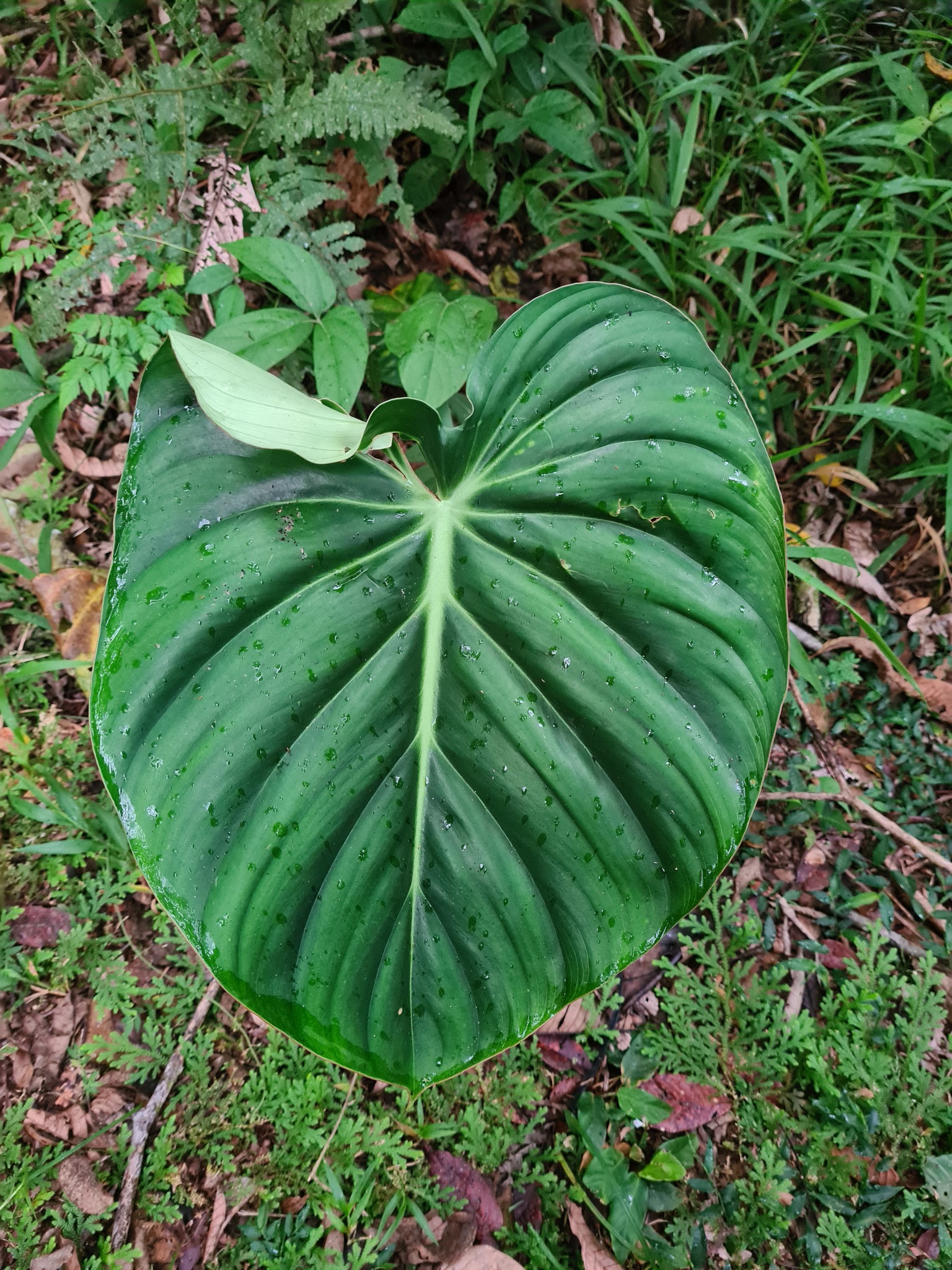
Philodendron pastazanum

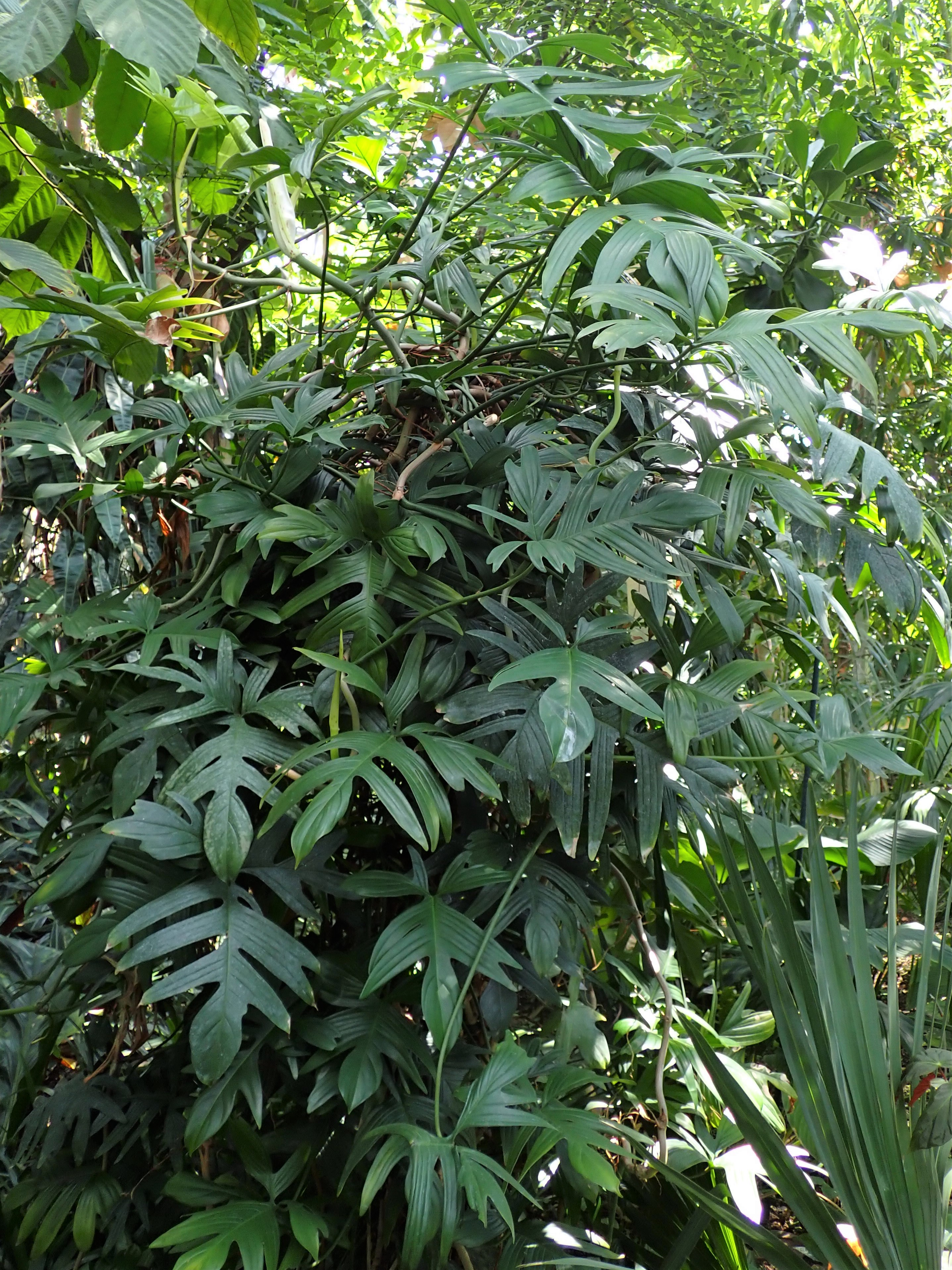
Philodendron pedatum

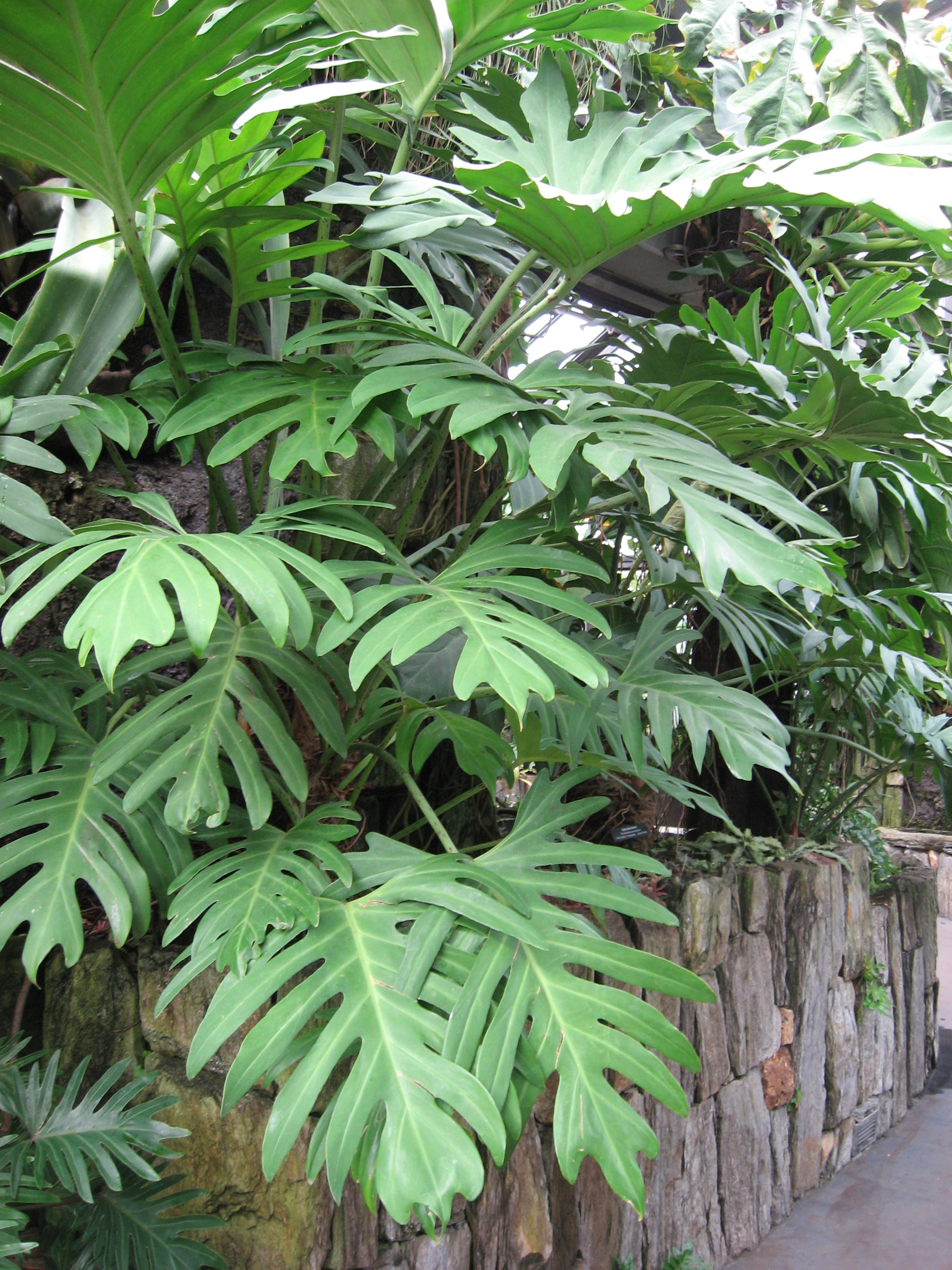
Philodendron pinnatifidum

- Philodendron pachycaule K.Krause – Ecuador
- Philodendron pachyphyllum K.Krause – Brazil (Central Bahia)
- Philodendron palaciosii Croat & Grayum – Ecuador (Napo)
- Philodendron palmicola Croat
- Philodendron paloraense Croat
- Philodendron paludicola E.G.Gonç. & Salviani – Brazil (Espírito Santo)
- Philodendron pambilarense Croat
- Philodendron panamense K.Krause – Panama to N. Peru
- Philodendron panduriforme (Kunth) Kunth – S. Tropical America
- Philodendron parvidactylum Croat
- Philodendron parvilobum Croat – Ecuador (Morona-Santiago)
- Philodendron pastazanum K.Krause – Ecuador to Peru
- Philodendron patriciae Croat – Colombia
- Philodendron paucinervium Croat – Peru (Loreto)
- Philodendron paxianum K.Krause – Peru to Bolivia
- Philodendron pedatum (Hook.) Kunth – S. Tropical America
- Philodendron pedunculum Croat & Grayum – Ecuador (Morona-Santiago)
- Philodendron peperomioides G.S.Bunting – Venezuela (Bolívar)
- Philodendron peraiense G.S.Bunting – Venezuela (Bolívar)
- Philodendron perplexum G.S.Bunting – N.W. Venezuela
- Philodendron petraeum Chodat & Vischer
- Philodendron phlebodes G.S.Bunting – S. Tropical America
- Philodendron picoranense Croat
- Philodendron pierrelianum Scherber., Croat, M.M.Mora & G.Ferry
- Philodendron pimichinese G.S.Bunting – Venezuela (Amazonas)
- Philodendron pinnatifidum (Jacq.) Schott – Venezuela to N. Brazil
- Philodendron pinnatilobum Engl. – N. Brazil to Bolivia
- Philodendron pipolyi Croat – Colombia
- Philodendron pirrense Croat – Panama (Darién)
- Philodendron placidum Schott – French Guiana
- Philodendron planadense Croat – Colombia to Ecuador
- Philodendron platypetiolatum Madison – Nicaragua to Ecuador
- Philodendron platypodum Gleason – Guianas, N. Brazil
- Philodendron pogonocaule Madison – S. Colombia to Ecuador
- Philodendron pokigronense Croat
- Philodendron polliciforme Croat & D.C.Bay – Colombia
- Philodendron popenoei Standl. & Steyerm. – Central America
- Philodendron populneum K.Koch ex Schott – Tropical America (?)
- Philodendron prancei Croat
- Philodendron profundisulcatum Croat
- Philodendron prominulinervium Croat – Colombia
- Philodendron propinquum Schott – Brazil (Pernambuco to Paraná)
- Philodendron pseudauriculatum Croat – Panama to N.W. Colombia
- Philodendron pseudoundulatum Grau – Bolivia (Santa Cruz)
- Philodendron pseudoverrucosum Croat
- Philodendron pteropus Mart. ex Engl. – N. Brazil, Ecuador, Peru
- Philodendron pterotum K.Koch & Augustin – Central America
- Philodendron puhuangii Croat – Colombia
- Philodendron pulchellum Engl. – N. Brazil (Acre) to Central Peru
- Philodendron pulchrum G.M.Barroso – S. Venezuela to Peru
- Philodendron purpureoviride Engl. – Costa Rica to Ecuador
- Philodendron purulhense Croat – Mexico (Chiapas) to Honduras
- Philodendron pusillum E.G.Gonç. & Bogner – Colombia

== Q–R ==
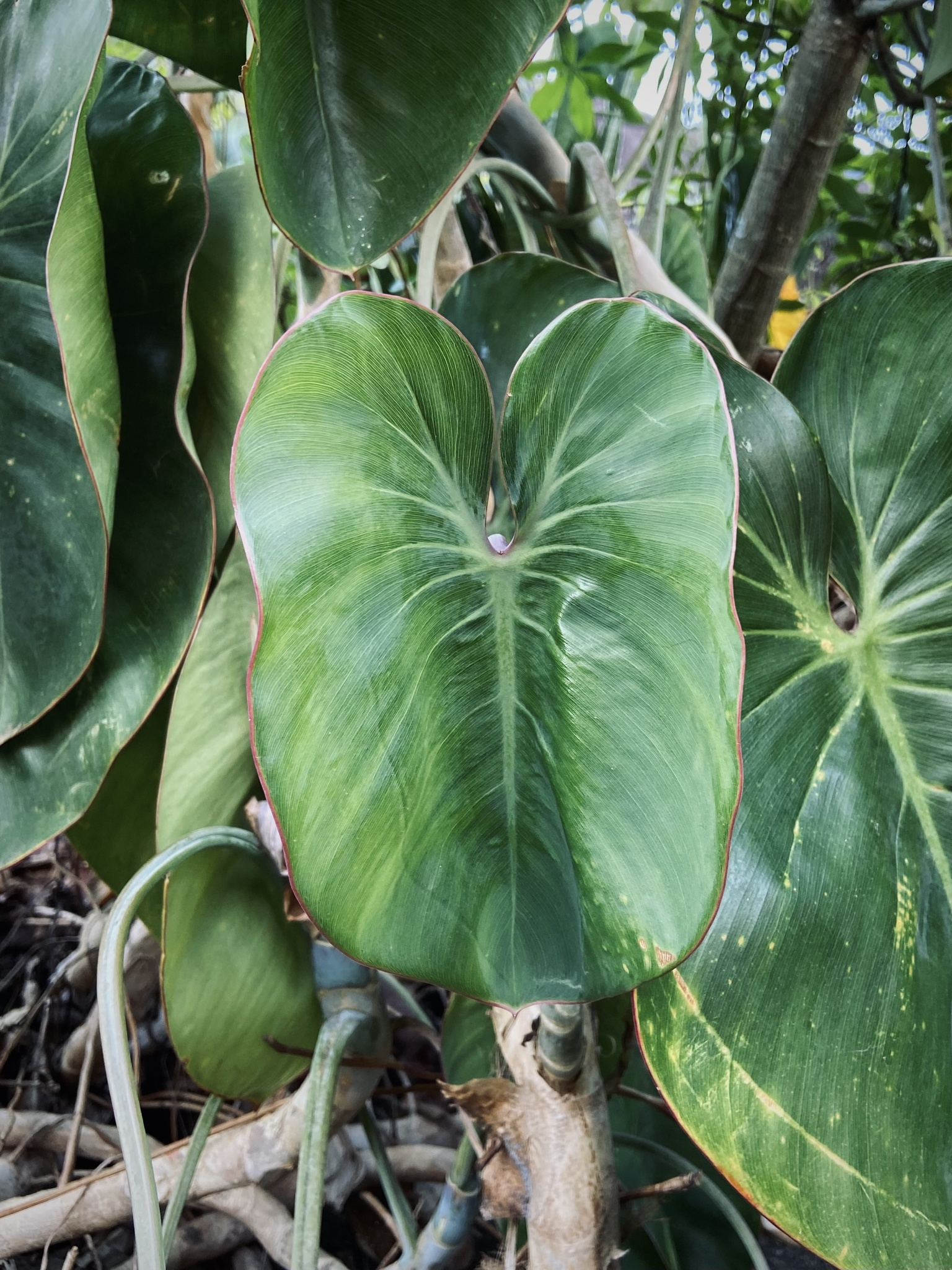
Philodendron ricardoi

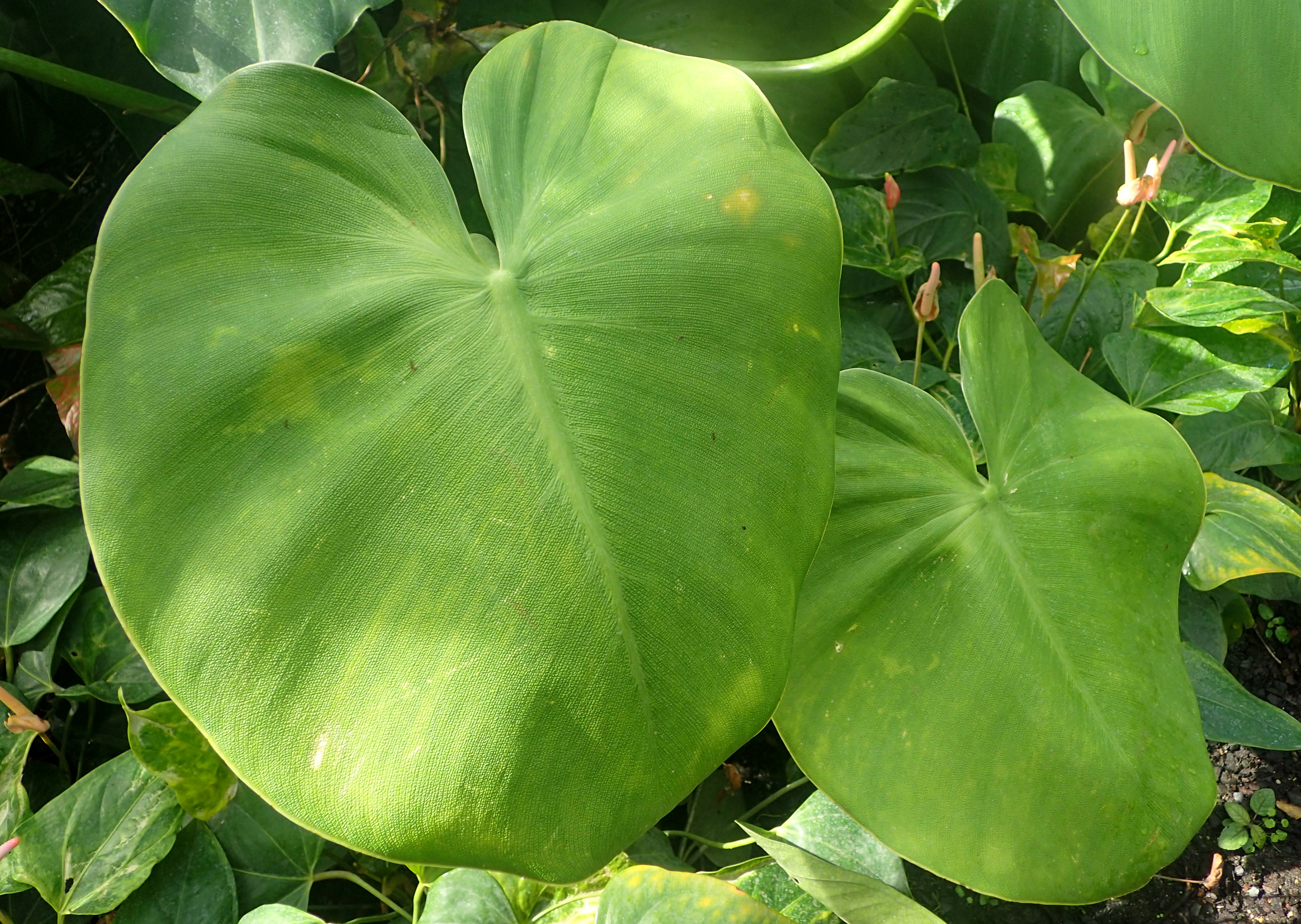
Philodendron rugosum

- Philodendron quelalii Croat & Mines
- Philodendron quinquelobum K.Krause – Brazil (Acre), Peru to Bolivia
- Philodendron quinquenervium Miq. – Trinidad to S. Tropical America
- Philodendron quitense Engl. – Ecuador
- Philodendron radiatum Schott – Mexico to N. Colombia
- Philodendron rayanum Croat & Grayum – Costa Rica to N.W. Colombia
- Philodendron recurvifolium Schott – Brazil (Bahia)
- Philodendron remifolium R.E.Schult. – S.E. Colombia to S. Venezuela
- Philodendron renateae Grayum
- Philodendron renauxii Reitz – Brazil (Santa Catarina)
- Philodendron reticulatum Grayum – N. Peru
- Philodendron rex A.Hay
- Philodendron rheophyticum Buturi & Temponi
- Philodendron rhizomatosum Sakuragui & Mayo – Brazil (Minas Gerais: Serra do Cipó)
- Philodendron rhodoaxis G.S.Bunting – Central & S. Tropical America
- Philodendron rhodospathiphyllum Croat & D.C.Bay – Colombia
- Philodendron rhodospermum Calazans & Sakur.
- Philodendron ricardoi E.G.Gonç. – Brazil (Espírito Santo)
- Philodendron ricaurtense Croat
- Philodendron rigidifolium K.Krause – S.E. Nicaragua to Panama
- Philodendron rimachii Croat – Peru
- Philodendron rio-pretense C.A.S.Bat. & M.L.Soares
- Philodendron riparium Engl. – Ecuador
- Philodendron robustum Schott – Tropical America (?)
- Philodendron rocioae Grayum
- Philodendron rodrigueziae Croat & Grayum – Ecuador
- Philodendron roezlii W.Bull – Colombia
- Philodendron rojasianum Standl. & Steyerm. – Mexico (Chiapas) to Costa Rica
- Philodendron romeroi Grayum – Colombia
- Philodendron roraimae K.Krause – N. South America to N. Brazil
- Philodendron roseocataphyllum Croat & M.M.Mora – Colombia to Ecuador
- Philodendron roseopetiolatum Nadruz & Mayo – Brazil (Rio de Janeiro)
- Philodendron roseospathum Croat – Panama to Colombia
- Philodendron rubioi Croat
- Philodendron rubrijuvenile Croat & R.Kaufmann
- Philodendron rubrocinctum Engl. – Colombia
- Philodendron rubromaculatum Croat & D.C.Bay – Colombia
- Philodendron rudgeanum Schott – Trinidad to N. & E. Brazil
- Philodendron rugapetiolatum Croat & M.M.Mora
- Philodendron rugosum Bogner & G.S.Bunting – Ecuador
- Philodendron ruizii Schott – Ecuador to Bolivia
- Philodendron ruthianum Nadruz – Brazil (Espírito Santo)

== S ==
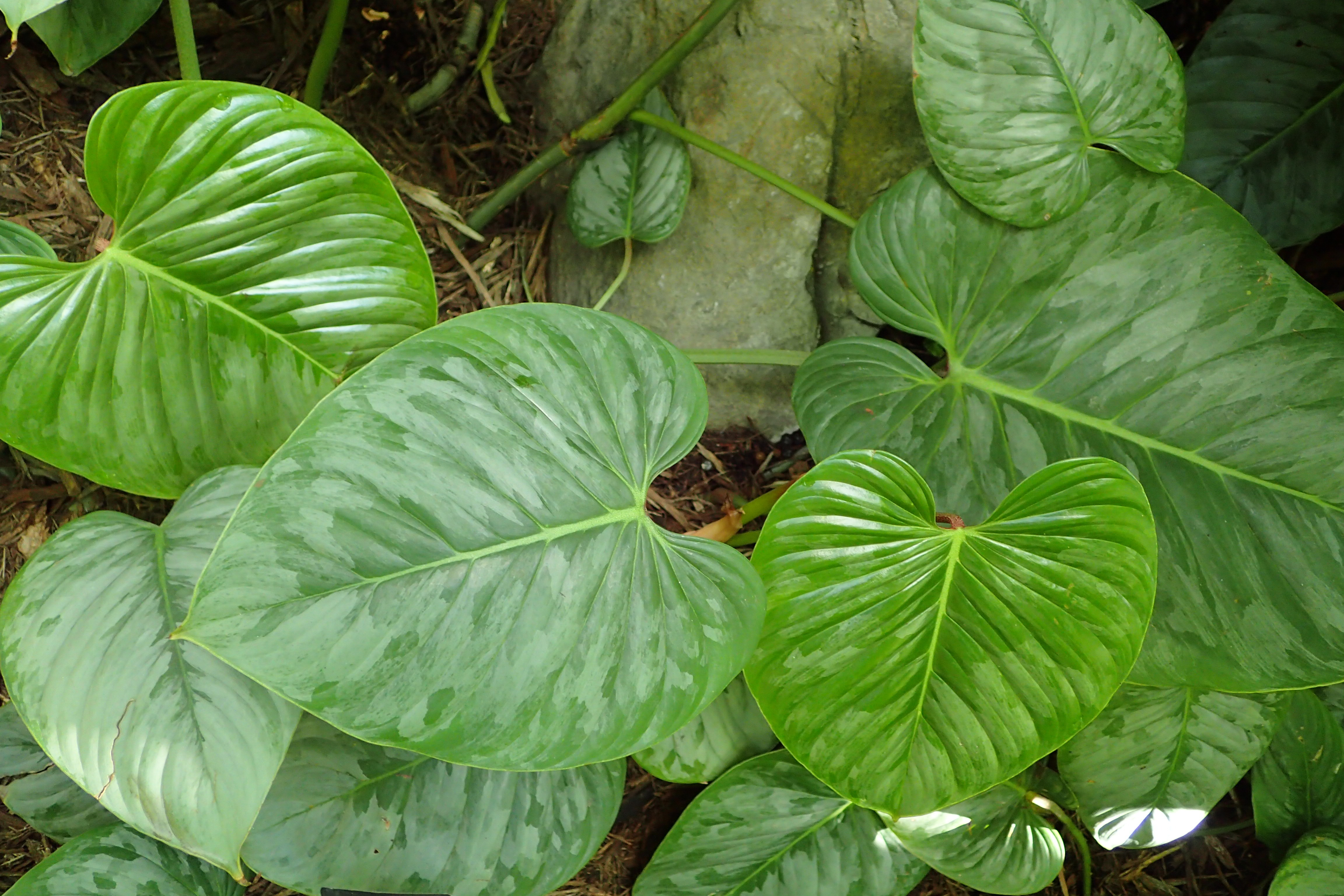
Philodendron sodiroi

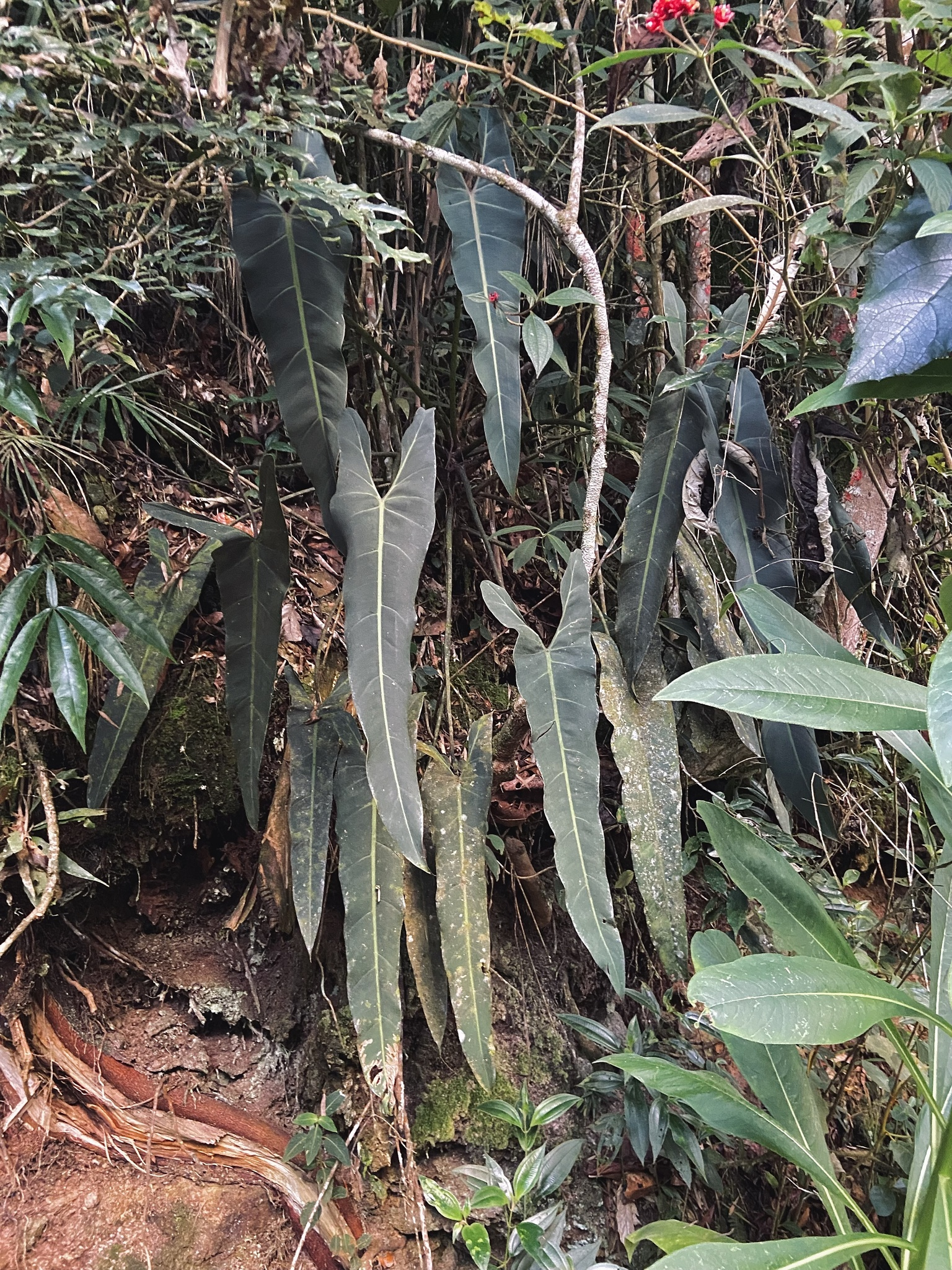
Philodendron spiritus-sancti

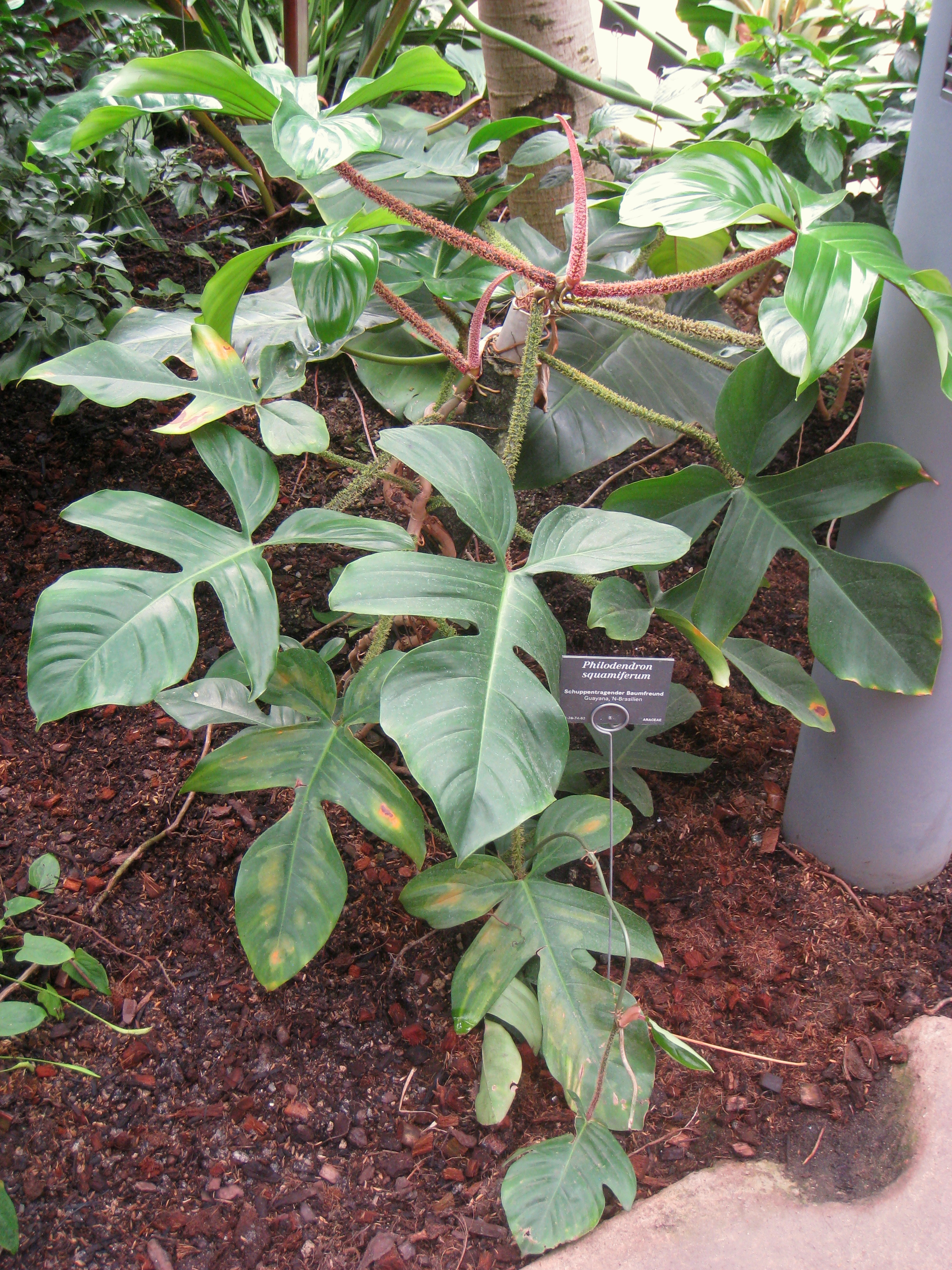
Philodendron squamiferum

- Philodendron sabaletense Croat
- Philodendron sagittifolium Liebm. – Mexico to Venezuela
- Philodendron samayense G.S.Bunting – Venezuela (Bolívar)
- Philodendron samudioense Croat & O.Ortiz
- Philodendron sanmarcoense Croat
- Philodendron santodominguense G.S.Bunting – N.W. Venezuela
- Philodendron saxicola K.Krause – Brazil (Bahia)
- Philodendron scalarinerve Croat & Grayum – Costa Rica to Ecuador
- Philodendron scherberichii Croat & M.M.Mora – Colombia
- Philodendron schmidtiae Croat & Cerón
- Philodendron schottianum H.Wendl. ex Schott – Costa Rica to Panama
- Philodendron schottii K.Koch – Jamaica, Mexico to Ecuador
- Philodendron scitulum G.S.Bunting – Venezuela (Amazonas)
- Philodendron scottmorianum Croat & Moonen – French Guiana
- Philodendron seguine Schott – Mexico to Guatemala
- Philodendron senatocarpium Madison – Colombia to Ecuador
- Philodendron serpens Hook.f. – Colombia to Ecuador
- Philodendron sharoniae Croat
- Philodendron silverstonei Croat – Colombia
- Philodendron simmondsii Mayo – Trinidad
- Philodendron simonianum Sakur. – Brazil (São Paulo: Pouso Alto)
- Philodendron simsii (Hook.) Sweet ex Kunth – Guyana, French Guiana, N. Brazil
- Philodendron simulans G.S.Bunting – Venezuela (Amazonas)
- Philodendron smithii Engl. – S. Mexico to Central America
- Philodendron sodiroi N.E.Br. – Colombia
- Philodendron solimoesense A.C.Sm. – S. Tropical America
- Philodendron sonderianum Schott – Brazil (S. Minas Gerais)
- Philodendron sousae Croat – Mexico (Chiapas)
- Philodendron sparreorum Croat – Colombia to Ecuador
- Philodendron speciosum Schott ex Endl. – Bolivia to Brazil
- Philodendron sphalerum Schott – Guianas to N. Brazil
- Philodendron spiritus-sancti G.S.Bunting – Brazil (Espírito Santo)
- Philodendron splitgerberi Schott – Guianas, N. Brazil
- Philodendron spruceanum G.S.Bunting – S. Venezuela
- Philodendron squamicaule Croat & Grayum – S.E. Nicaragua to Ecuador
- Philodendron squamiferum Poepp. – Guianas, N. Brazil
- Philodendron squamipetiolatum Croat – Panama to Ecuador
- Philodendron standleyi Grayum – Mexico to Central America
- Philodendron stenolobum E.G.Gonç. – Brazil (Espírito Santo)
- Philodendron stenophyllum K.Krause – Peru
- Philodendron steyermarkii G.S.Bunting – S. Tropical America
- Philodendron straminicaule Croat – Costa Rica to Colombia
- Philodendron striatum Croat & D.C.Bay – Colombia
- Philodendron strictum G.S.Bunting – Costa Rica to N.W. Venezuela and Ecuador
- Philodendron suberosum Croat & D.C.Bay – Colombia
- Philodendron subhastatum K.Krause – Colombia to Ecuador
- Philodendron subincisum Schott – Mexico (N. Veracruz)
- Philodendron sucrense G.S.Bunting – Venezuela (Sucre)
- Philodendron sulcatum K.Krause – Nicaragua to Ecuador
- Philodendron sulcicaule Croat – S.E. Costa Rica to Panama
- Philodendron surinamense (Miq.) Engl. – S. Tropical America
- Philodendron swartiae Croat – N. Peru

== T ==
- Philodendron tachirense G.S.Bunting – Venezuela (Táchira)
- Philodendron tarmense Engl. – Peru
- Philodendron tatei K.Krause – N. South America to N. Brazil
- Philodendron tenue K.Koch & Augustin – Central America to Venezuela and Ecuador
- Philodendron tenuipes Engl. – Ecuador
- Philodendron tenuispadix E.G.Gonç. – Brazil (Espírito Santo)
- Philodendron teretipes Sprague – Colombia
- Philodendron thalassicum Croat & Grayum – Central Costa Rica to W. Panama
- Philodendron thaliifolium Schott – Venezuela
- Philodendron theofiloanum Calazans
- Philodendron tortum M.L.Soares & Mayo – Brazil (Amazonas)
- Philodendron toshibae M.L.Soares & Mayo – Brazil (Amazonas)
- Philodendron traunii Engl. – N. Brazil
- Philodendron triangulare G.S.Bunting – Venezuela (Trujillo)
- Philodendron tricostatum Croat & D.C.Bay – Colombia
- Philodendron tripartitum (Jacq.) Schott – Mexico to Tropical America
- Philodendron triplum G.S.Bunting – Venezuela (Bolívar)
- Philodendron trisectifolium Croat
- Philodendron trojitense Croat & D.C.Bay – Colombia
- Philodendron trujilloi G.S.Bunting – Venezuela
- Philodendron tuerckheimii Grayum – S. Mexico to Venezuela and Ecuador
- Philodendron tweedieanum Schott – Brazil (Mato Grosso do Sul), Paraguay, N.E. Argentina
- Philodendron tysonii Croat – Panama

== U–V ==
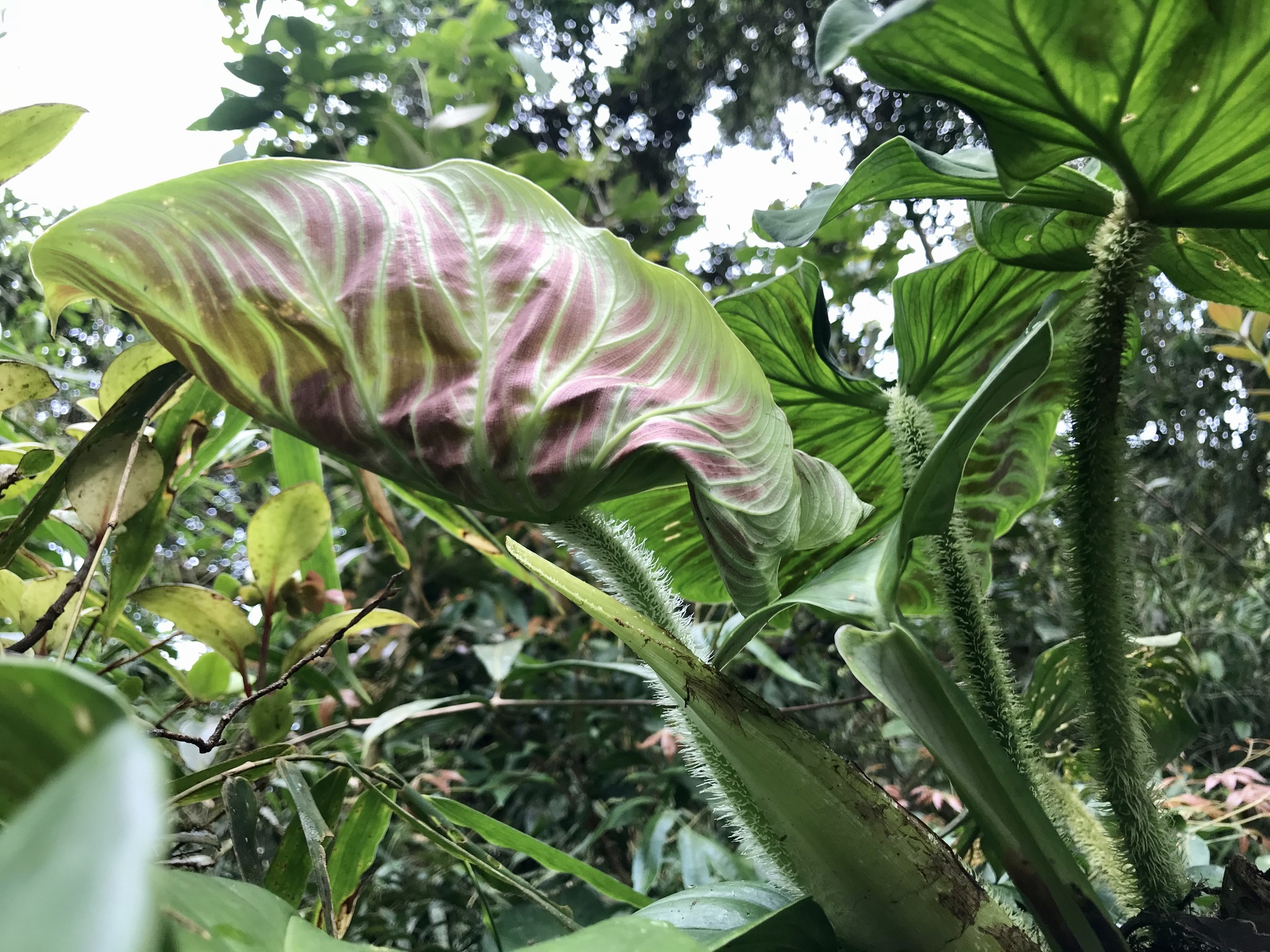
Philodendron verrucosum

- Philodendron ubigantupense Croat – Panama (San Blas)
- Philodendron uleanum Engl. – S. Tropical America
- Philodendron uliginosum Mayo – Brazil
- Philodendron undulatum Engl. – Brazil to Argentina (Entre Ríos)
- Philodendron urraoense Croat – Colombia
- Philodendron ushanum Croat & Moonen – French Guiana
- Philodendron utleyanum Croat – Panama (Colón)
- Philodendron validinervium Engl. – Ecuador
- Philodendron vargealtense Sakuragui – Brazil (Espírito Santo)
- Philodendron variifolium Schott – Peru
- Philodendron venezuelense G.S.Bunting – S. Venezuela to N. Brazil
- Philodendron venosum (Willd. ex Schult. & Schult.f.) Croat – Trinidad-Tobago to Venezuela
- Philodendron ventricosum Madison – Ecuador
- Philodendron venulosum Croat & D.C.Bay – Colombia
- Philodendron venustifoliatum E.G.Gonç. & Mayo – W. Central Brazil
- Philodendron venustum G.S.Bunting – S. Venezuela to Peru
- Philodendron verapazense Croat – Mexico (Chiapas), Guatemala
- Philodendron verrucapetiolum Croat – Colombia to Ecuador
- Philodendron verrucosum L.Mathieu ex Schott – Costa Rica to Peru
- Philodendron victoriae G.S.Bunting – Venezuela
- Philodendron vinaceum G.S.Bunting – Venezuela (Bolívar)
- Philodendron viride Engl. – Colombia

== W–Z ==
- Philodendron wadedavisii Croat – Colombia to Brazil (Amazonas)
- Philodendron wallisii Regel ex Engl. – Colombia
- Philodendron warszewiczii K.Koch & C.D.Bouché – S. Mexico to Central America
- Philodendron weberbaueri Engl. – Peru
- Philodendron wendlandii Schott – S.E. Nicaragua to Panama
- Philodendron werkhoveniae Croat – Suriname
- Philodendron werneri Croat
- Philodendron wilburii Croat & Grayum – Costa Rica to Panama
- Philodendron williamsii Hook.f. – Brazil (Bahia)
- Philodendron wittianum Engl. – S. Tropical America
- Philodendron woronowii K.Krause – Colombia (Antioquia)
- Philodendron wullschlaegelii Schott – W. Central Brazil (to Tocantins)
- Philodendron wurdackii G.S.Bunting – S. Tropical America
- Philodendron xanadu Croat, Mayo & J.Boos – S. Brazil to Paraguay
- Philodendron yavitense G.S.Bunting – Venezuela (Amazonas)
- Philodendron yutajense G.S.Bunting – Venezuela (Amazonas)
- Philodendron zhuanum Croat – Panama (Coclé)
