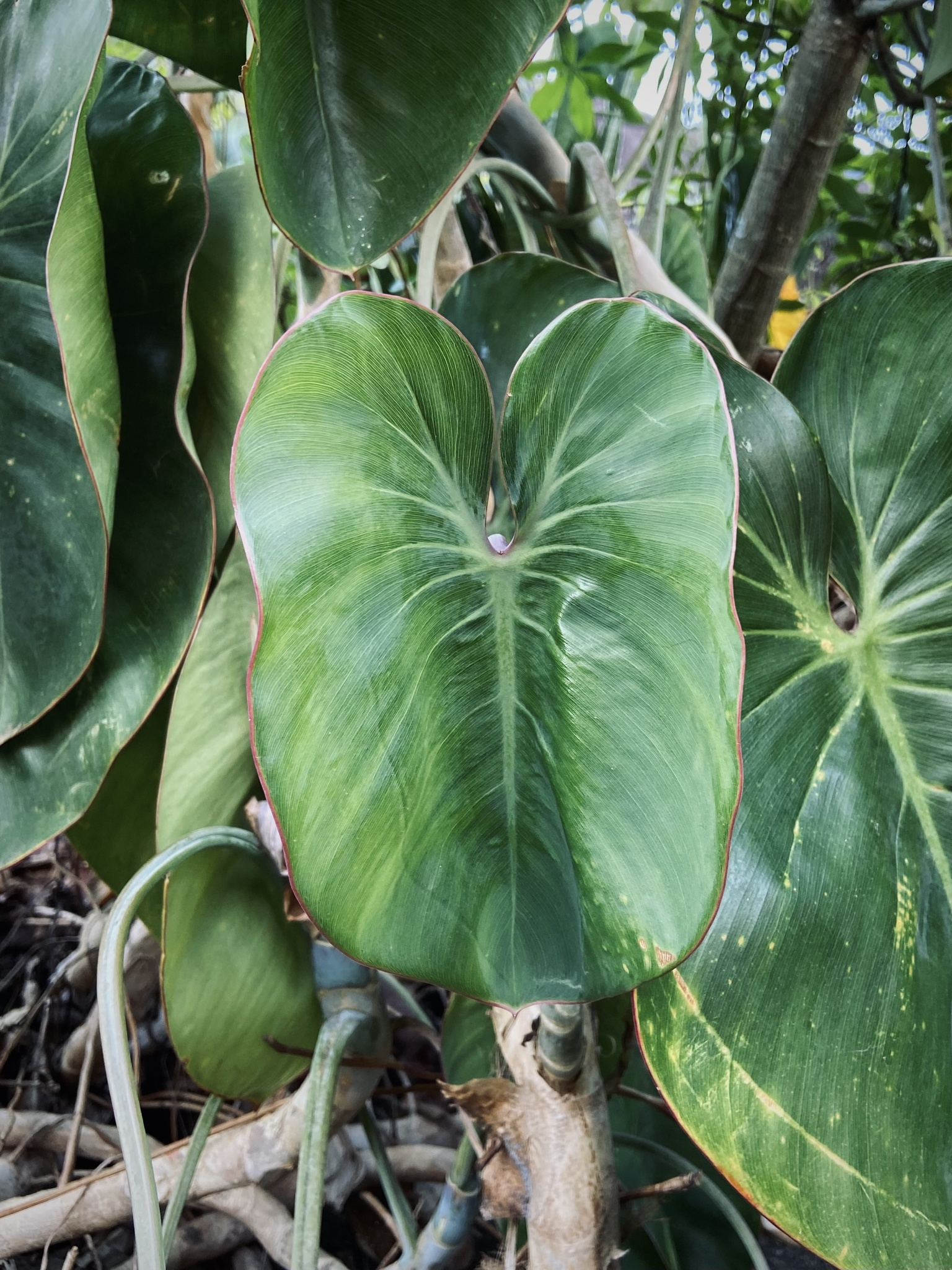

Scientific classification
- Kingdom: Plantae
- Clade: Tracheophytes
- Clade: Angiosperms
- Clade: Monocots
- Order: Alismatales
- Family: Araceae
- Genus: Philodendron
- Species: P. ricardoi

Binomial name
- Philodendron ricardoi E.G.Gonç.

= Philodendron ricardoi =

Species of plant

Philodendron ricardoi is a species of plant in the genus Philodendron native to Espírito Santo in Brazil. It is named for the Brazilian palm grower Ricardo Gonzaga Campos, who collected some original samples of the species to be studied. It has thick stems and a crown of leaves that are ovate to rotundate in shape. In natural habitat it grows in the open on rocky outcroppings, somewhat similarly to Philodendron cipoense of neighboring Minas Gerais state.

== See also ==
- List of Philodendron species
