= Philodendron bakeri =

Scientific classification
- Kingdom: Plantae
- Clade: Tracheophytes
- Clade: Angiosperms
- Clade: Monocots
- Order: Alismatales
- Family: Araceae
- Genus: Philodendron
- Species: P. bakeri

Binomial name
- Philodendron bakeri Croat & Grayum

Species of plant

Philodendron bakeri is a plant species native to Colombia, Costa Rica, Nicaragua, and Panama.

== See also ==
- List of Philodendron species
