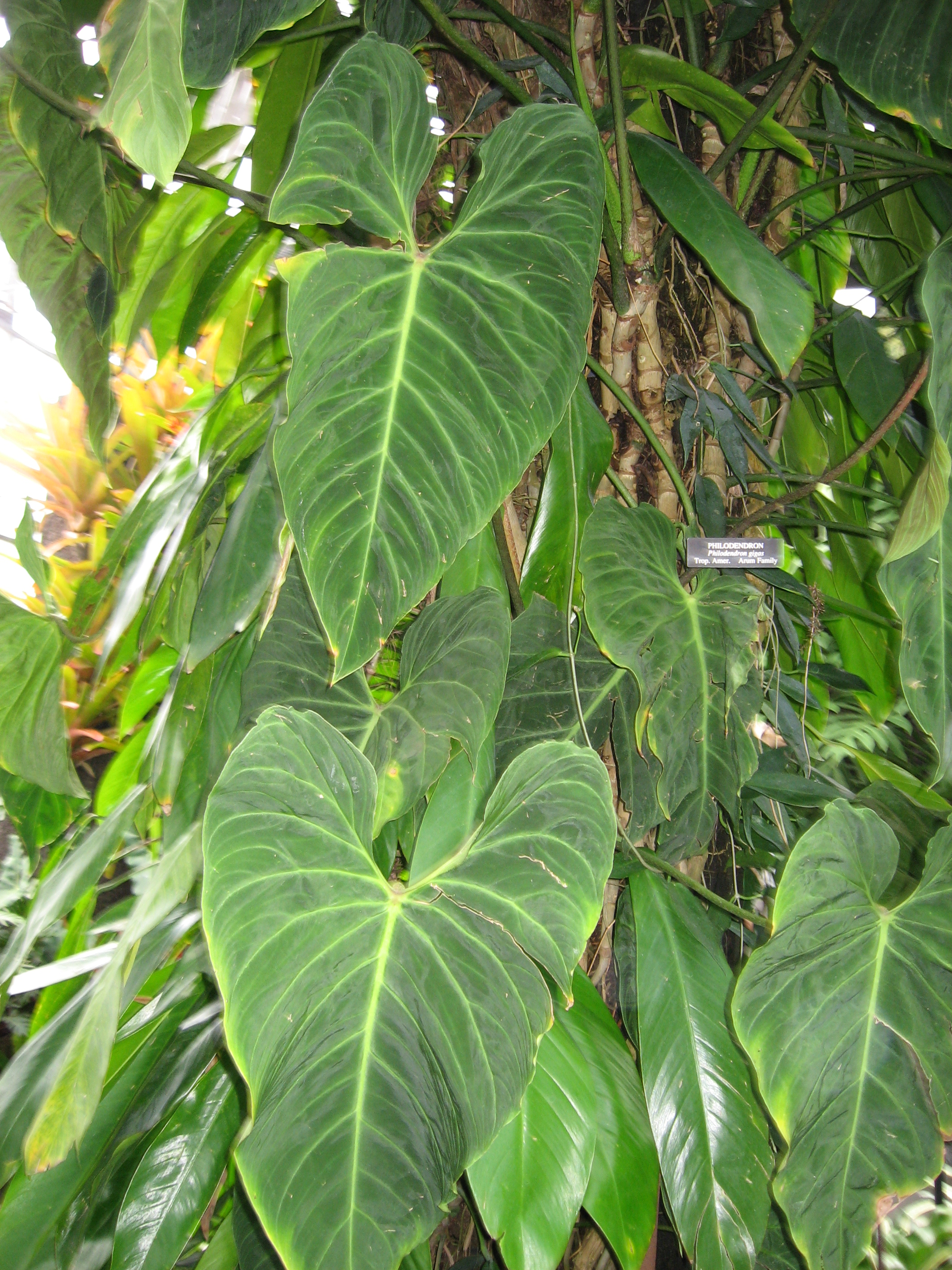

Scientific classification
- Kingdom: Plantae
- Clade: Embryophytes
- Clade: Tracheophytes
- Clade: Spermatophytes
- Clade: Angiosperms
- Clade: Monocots
- Order: Alismatales
- Family: Araceae
- Genus: Philodendron
- Species: P. gigas

Binomial name
- Philodendron gigas Croat

= Philodendron gigas =

Species of flowering plant

Philodendron gigas is a species of flowering plant in the family Araceae. It is endemic to Panama, first described in 1997.

== See also ==
- List of Philodendron species
