= Philodendron annulatum =

Scientific classification
- Kingdom: Plantae
- Clade: Tracheophytes
- Clade: Angiosperms
- Clade: Monocots
- Order: Alismatales
- Family: Araceae
- Genus: Philodendron
- Species: P. annulatum

Binomial name
- Philodendron annulatum Croat

Species of plant

Philodendron annulatum is a plant species endemic to Panama.

== See also ==
- List of Philodendron species
