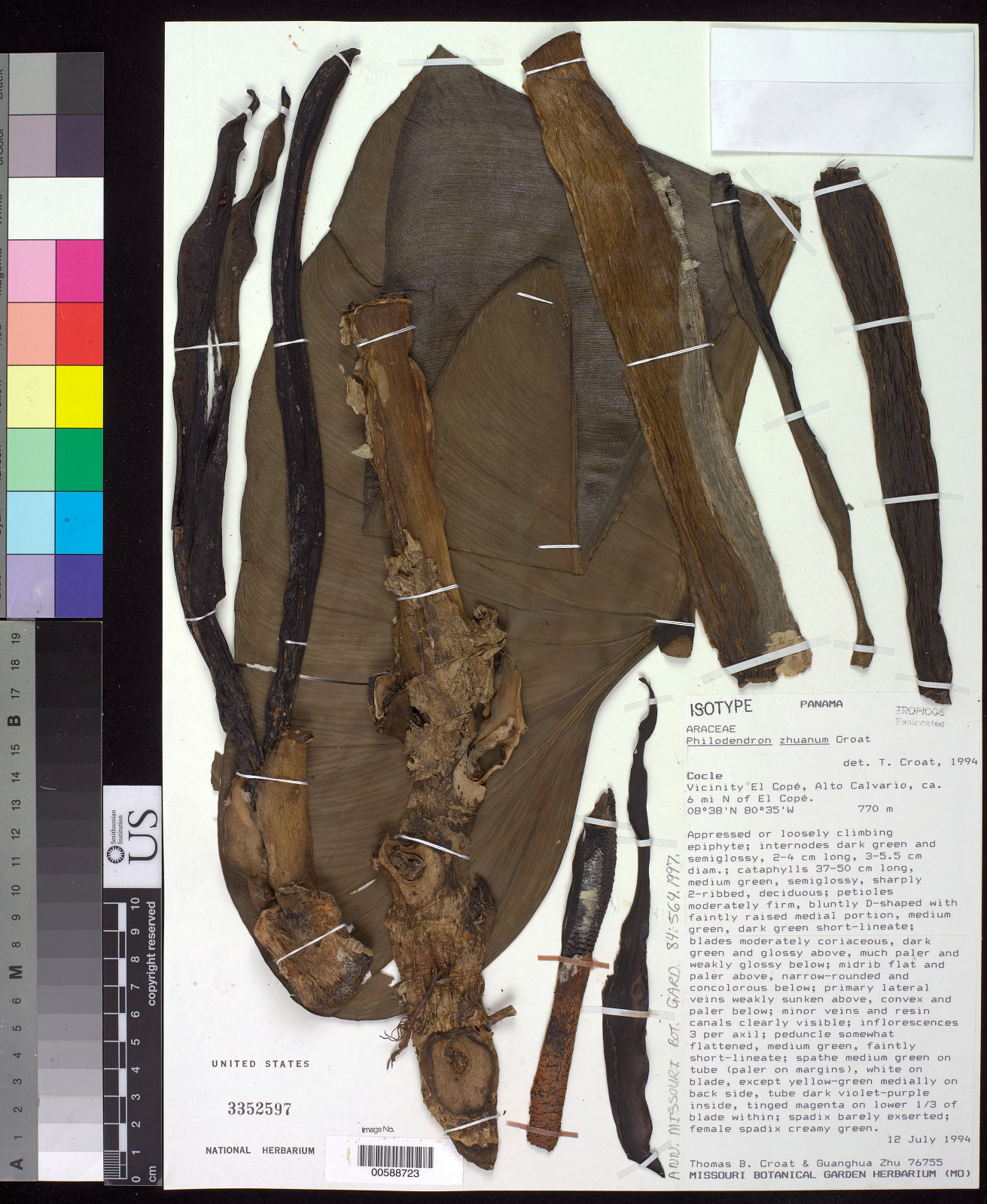
- A flattened museum specimen of Philodendron zhuanum

Scientific classification
- Kingdom: Plantae
- Clade: Tracheophytes
- Clade: Angiosperms
- Clade: Monocots
- Order: Alismatales
- Family: Araceae
- Genus: Philodendron
- Species: P. zhuanum

Binomial name
- Philodendron zhuanum Croat

= Philodendron zhuanum =

Species of plant

Philodendron zhuanum is a plant species endemic to Panama. It has large leaf blades, measuring between 36-62cm long and 27-32cm wide, with convex margins. There are up to three inflorescences on each axil, and the peduncles are over 9cm long. The flowers are pistillate with either eight or nine locules within the ovary.

== See also ==
- List of Philodendron species
