= Philodendron bazii =

Scientific classification
- Kingdom: Plantae
- Clade: Tracheophytes
- Clade: Angiosperms
- Clade: Monocots
- Order: Alismatales
- Family: Araceae
- Genus: Philodendron
- Species: P. bazii

Binomial name
- Philodendron bazii Matuda

Species of plant

Philodendron bazii is a plant species endemic to Mexico. The epithet is also spelt basii.

== See also ==
- List of Philodendron species
