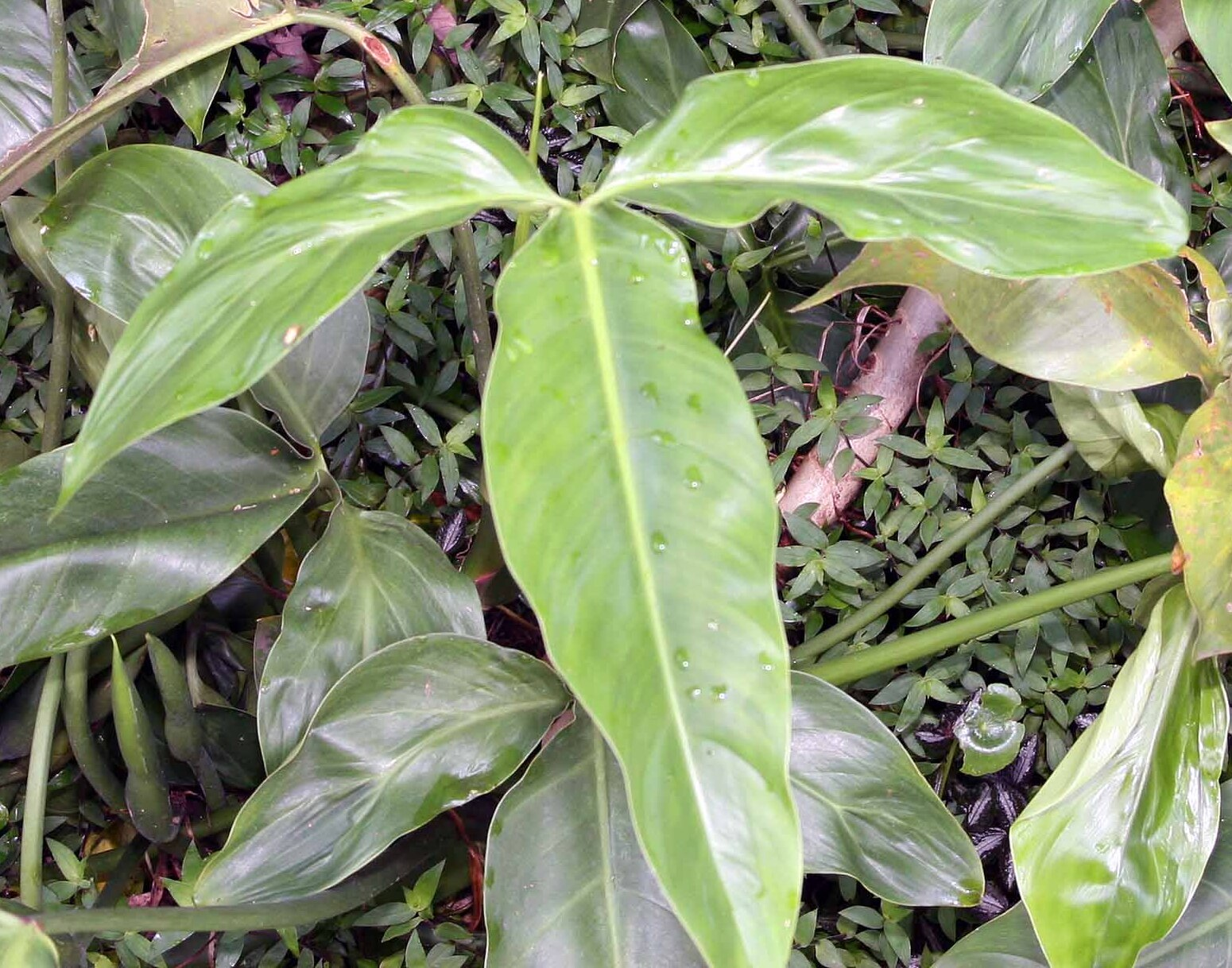

Scientific classification
- Kingdom: Plantae
- Clade: Tracheophytes
- Clade: Angiosperms
- Clade: Monocots
- Order: Alismatales
- Family: Araceae
- Genus: Philodendron
- Species: P. anisotomum

Binomial name
- Philodendron anisotomum Schott

= Philodendron anisotomum =

Species of plant

Philodendron anisotomum is a plant species from Central America.

== See also ==
- List of Philodendron species
