= Philodendron angustisectum =

Scientific classification
- Kingdom: Plantae
- Clade: Tracheophytes
- Clade: Angiosperms
- Clade: Monocots
- Order: Alismatales
- Family: Araceae
- Genus: Philodendron
- Species: P. angustisectum

Binomial name
- Philodendron angustisectum Engl.

Species of flowering plant

Philodendron angustisectum, called the cut-leaved philodendron, is a species of flowering plant in the genus Philodendron, disjunctly found in Bolivia and Colombia. It has gained the Royal Horticultural Society's Award of Garden Merit as a hothouse ornamental.
