= Philodendron longilobatum =

Scientific classification
- Kingdom: Plantae
- Clade: Tracheophytes
- Clade: Angiosperms
- Clade: Monocots
- Order: Alismatales
- Family: Araceae
- Genus: Philodendron
- Species: P. longilobatum

Binomial name
- Philodendron longilobatum Sakur.

Species of plant

Philodendron longilobatum is a species of flowering plant in the family Araceae. It is endemic to Espírito Santo, Brazil. With its adaptable growth habit, dramatic leaf shape, and robust rhizomes, it has found use in hanging baskets, and in indoor and outdoor landscaping.
