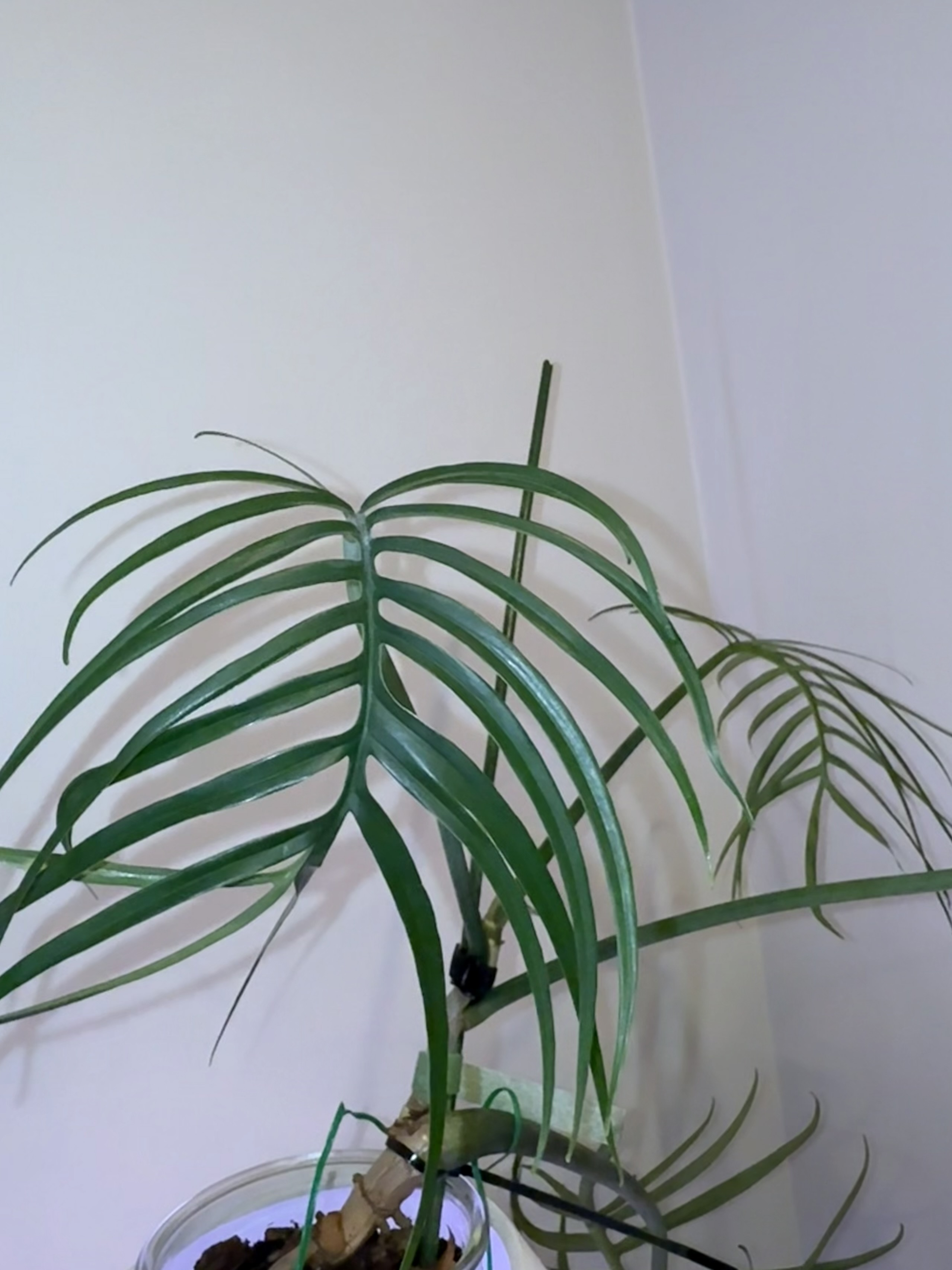
- Fern-like fenestrated leaves of a Philodendron tortum grown as a houseplant

Scientific classification
- Kingdom: Plantae
- Clade: Embryophytes
- Clade: Tracheophytes
- Clade: Spermatophytes
- Clade: Angiosperms
- Clade: Monocots
- Order: Alismatales
- Family: Araceae
- Genus: Philodendron
- Species: P. tortum

Binomial name
- Philodendron tortum M.L.Soares & Mayo

= Philodendron tortum =

Species of plant

Philodendron tortum is a species of flowering plant in the family Araceae, native to northern Brazil and Bolivia. A climber, it is typically found in the wet tropics. It is available from commercial houseplant suppliers.
