= Philodendron ichthyoderma =

Scientific classification
- Kingdom: Plantae
- Clade: Embryophytes
- Clade: Tracheophytes
- Clade: Spermatophytes
- Clade: Angiosperms
- Clade: Monocots
- Order: Alismatales
- Family: Araceae
- Genus: Philodendron
- Species: P. ichthyoderma

Binomial name
- Philodendron ichthyoderma Croat & Grayum

Species of plant

Philodendron ichthyoderma is a species of aroid monocot found in forests in Panama, Colombia, and Ecuador.

== Description ==
Philodendron ichthyoderma has distinctively scaly and cracked stems and petioles, which can be used to distinguish it from other species. The stems are also relatively thick and the blades large, with fifteen or more primary lateral veins on each side of the blade. They are vine-like climbers with small (<3 cm) peduncles and pistillate flowers lacking staminodes. It has the potential to be mistaken for Philodendron inaequilaterum. They flower around a meter above the ground.

== Habitat ==
The plants live in both semi-deciduous and evergreen forests of Panama, Colombia, and Ecuador. They usually live in areas under 800 m in altitude.
