= Philodendron mexicanum =

Scientific classification
- Kingdom: Plantae
- Clade: Tracheophytes
- Clade: Angiosperms
- Clade: Monocots
- Order: Alismatales
- Family: Araceae
- Genus: Philodendron
- Species: P. mexicanum

Binomial name
- Philodendron mexicanum Engl.

Synonyms
- Philodendron latisagittium Matuda

Species of plant

Philodendron mexicanum is a species of flowering plant in the family Araceae. It is native to central and southwestern Mexico including Veracruz, Guatemala, Honduras, Costa Rica, and Colombia. An evergreen vine of the wet tropics, it reaches 2 m (7 ft) tall as a houseplant. Its young leaves are lanceolate, and its mature leaves are lobed and spear-shaped, and can be 60 cm (2 ft) long.
