= Philodendron brenesii =

Scientific classification
- Kingdom: Plantae
- Clade: Tracheophytes
- Clade: Angiosperms
- Clade: Monocots
- Order: Alismatales
- Family: Araceae
- Genus: Philodendron
- Species: P. brenesii

Binomial name
- Philodendron brenesii Standl.

Species of plant

Philodendron brenesii is a species of flowering plant in the family Araceae. It is native to Costa Rica, Panama, and northwestern Colombia. A robust climber, it is known for its ease of care and tolerance of low light conditions, and is available from specialty retailers as a houseplant.
