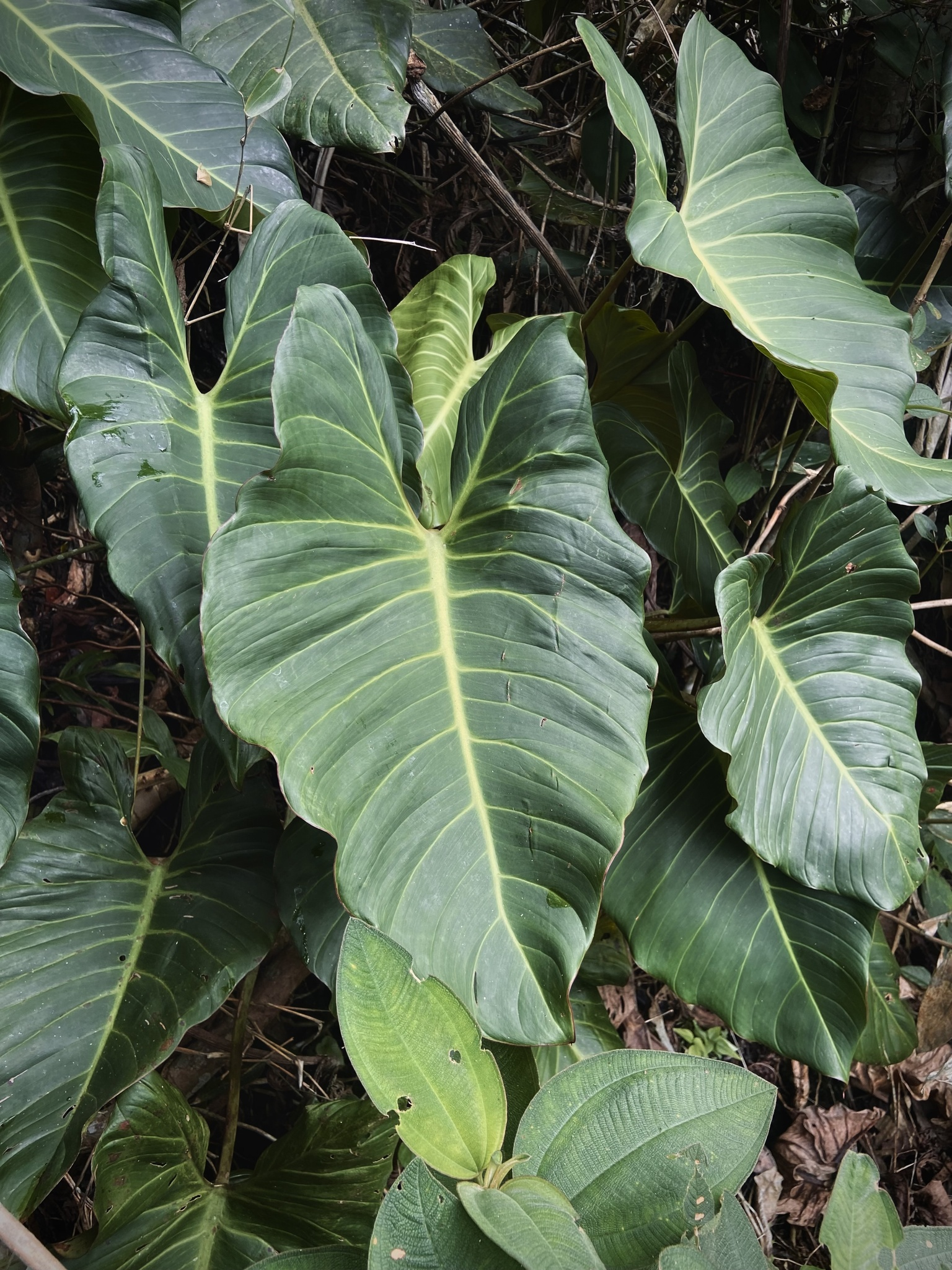
- Philodendron vargealtense in habitat

Scientific classification
- Kingdom: Plantae
- Clade: Tracheophytes
- Clade: Angiosperms
- Clade: Monocots
- Order: Alismatales
- Family: Araceae
- Genus: Philodendron
- Species: P. vargealtense

Binomial name
- Philodendron vargealtense Sakuragui

= Philodendron vargealtense =

Species of plant

Philodendron vargealtense is a species of plant in the genus Philodendron native to southeastern Brazil in the state of Espírito Santo. Like others in its genus, it is a climbing hemiepiphyte or rupicolous (growing on rocks), and is in the section Calostigma. It is similar to Philodendron myrmecophilum.

== See also ==
- List of Philodendron species
