= Philodendron leyvae =

Conservation status
- Vulnerable (IUCN 3.1)

Scientific classification
- Kingdom: Plantae
- Clade: Tracheophytes
- Clade: Angiosperms
- Clade: Monocots
- Order: Alismatales
- Family: Araceae
- Genus: Philodendron
- Species: P. leyvae

Binomial name
- Philodendron leyvae García-Barr.

Species of plant

Philodendron leyvae is a species of flowering plant in the family Araceae, endemic to wet tropical forests of Colombia. A climber, it is known from only 6 stations in Colombia at elevations from 200 to 1,600 m (700 to 5,200 ft), and is assessed as Vulnerable.
