= Philodendron advena =

Scientific classification
- Kingdom: Plantae
- Clade: Tracheophytes
- Clade: Angiosperms
- Clade: Monocots
- Order: Alismatales
- Family: Araceae
- Genus: Philodendron
- Species: P. advena

Binomial name
- Philodendron advena Schott

Synonyms
- Philodendron jamapanum G.S.Bunting; Philodendron monticola Matuda; Philodendron subovatum Schott

Species of plant

Philodendron advena is a species of flowering plant in the family Araceae. Native to central and southern Mexico, Guatemala, Honduras, and Colombia, it is found in humid tropical rainforests growing on a variety of substrates. As a consequence, it is resilient and adaptable to confined indoor situations, and is valued by aroid enthusiasts for its dramatic, tropical foliage.
