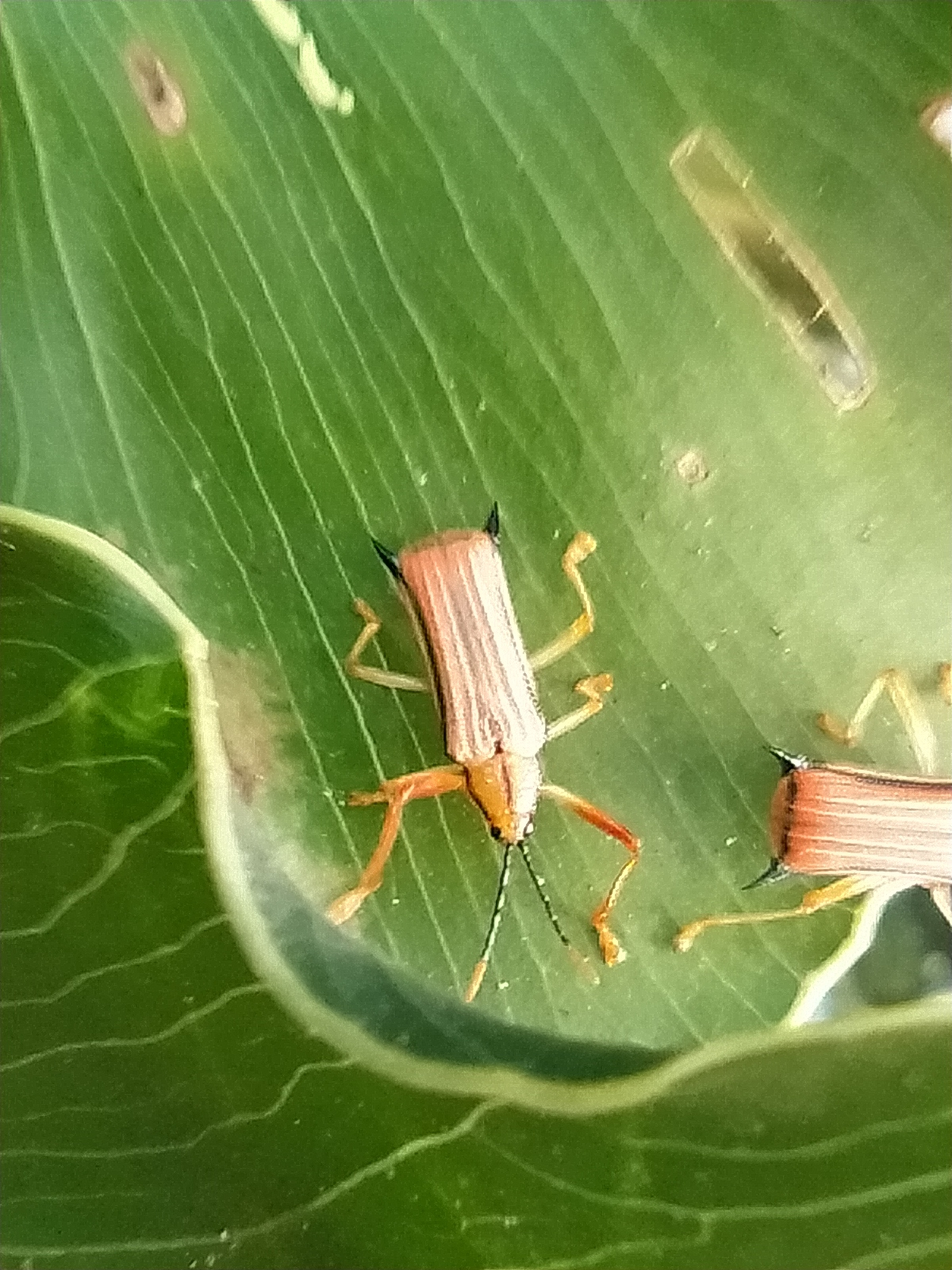

Scientific classification
- Kingdom: Animalia
- Phylum: Arthropoda
- Clade: Pancrustacea
- Class: Insecta
- Order: Coleoptera
- Suborder: Polyphaga
- Infraorder: Cucujiformia
- Family: Chrysomelidae
- Genus: Sceloenopla
- Species: S. bidens

Binomial name
- Sceloenopla bidens (Fabricius, 1792)

Synonyms
- Hispa bidens Fabricius, 1792; Cephalodonta bidens

= Sceloenopla bidens =

Species of beetle

Sceloenopla bidens is a species of beetle of the family Chrysomelidae. It is found in Brazil, Colombia, Ecuador, French Guiana, Peru and Suriname.

== Description ==
Adults are elongate, flattened above and pale fulvous. The head is smooth and longitudinally grooved above. The eyes and seven basal joints of the antennae are black. The thorax is as broad as long, the sides rounded behind, obliquely narrowed in front, the anterior angles produced and subacute, above coarsely punctured, the lateral margin and a central vitta, the latter abbreviated in front and at its extreme base, purple black. The scutellum is shining and obscure purple. The elytra are broader than the thorax, parallel, scarcely broader behind and narrowly margined, the posterior angles armed with a large flattened spine, directed obliquely backwards. The apex is rounded, the apical margin minutely toothed, above flattened along the back. Each elytron has four elevated costae, the one near the outer margin less distinctly raised than the rest, the interspaces with a double row of deep punctures. The posterior angles, a narrow submarginal vitta, a pale subapical fascia, and an indistinct sutural line abbreviated towards its apex are shining purple with a metallic reflexion.

== Life history ==
The recorded host plants for this species are Philodendron species, including Philodendron renauxii.
