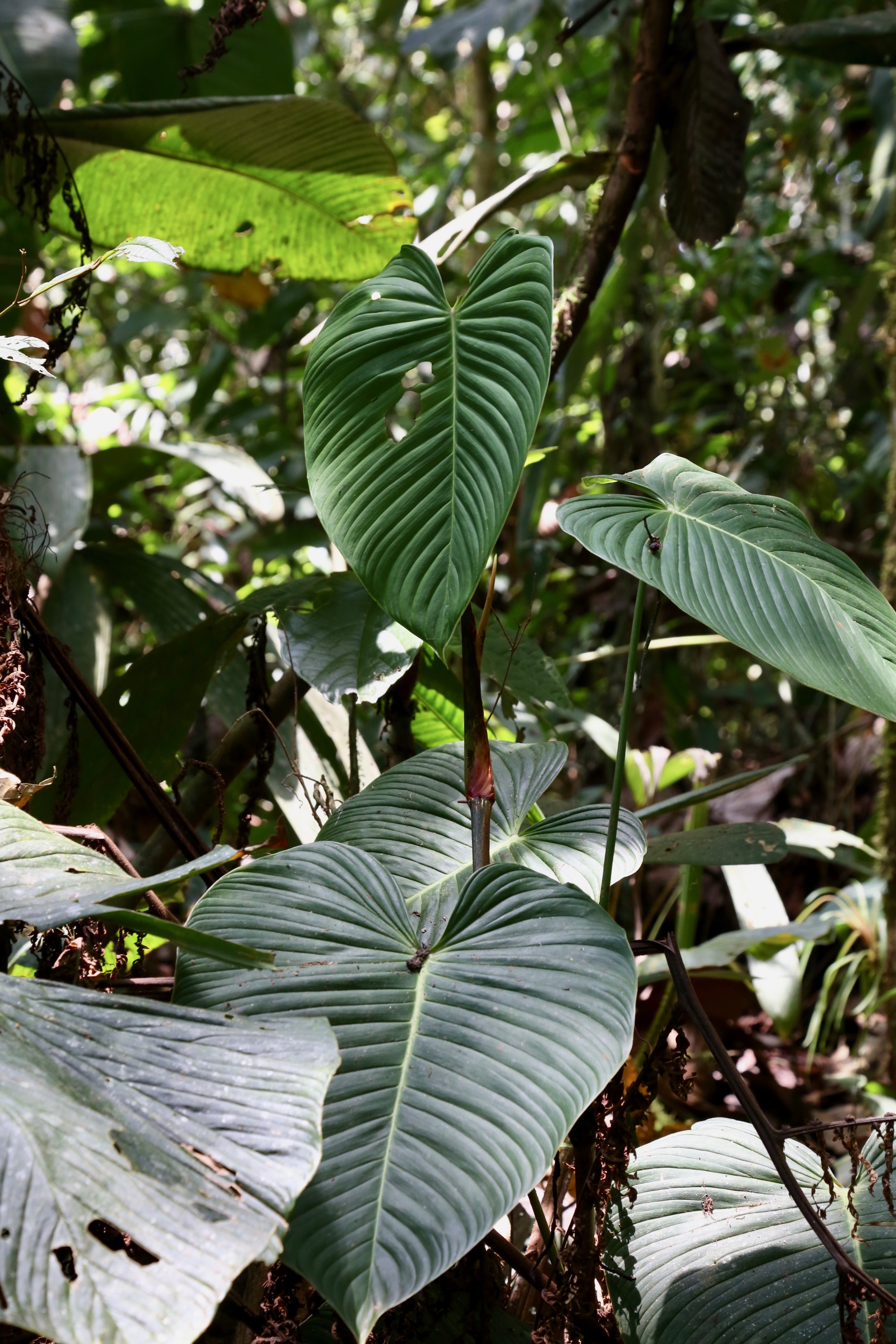
- Philodendron grandipes in Ecuador

Conservation status
- Least Concern (IUCN 3.1)

Scientific classification
- Kingdom: Plantae
- Clade: Tracheophytes
- Clade: Angiosperms
- Clade: Monocots
- Order: Alismatales
- Family: Araceae
- Genus: Philodendron
- Species: P. grandipes

Binomial name
- Philodendron grandipes K.Krause

Synonyms
- Philodendron pleistoneurum Standl. & L.O.Williams

= Philodendron grandipes =

Species of plant

Philodendron grandipes is a species of plant in the genus Philodendron native to Central and South America from Nicaragua to Ecuador. It has green cordate foliage and is commonly terrestrial in habit. Philodendron grandipes is a member of Philodendron section Philodendron, subsect. Philodendron ser. Fibrosa. It is most closely related to Philodendron jodavisianum, which shares D-shaped petioles despite different growth habits.

== See also ==
- List of Philodendron species
