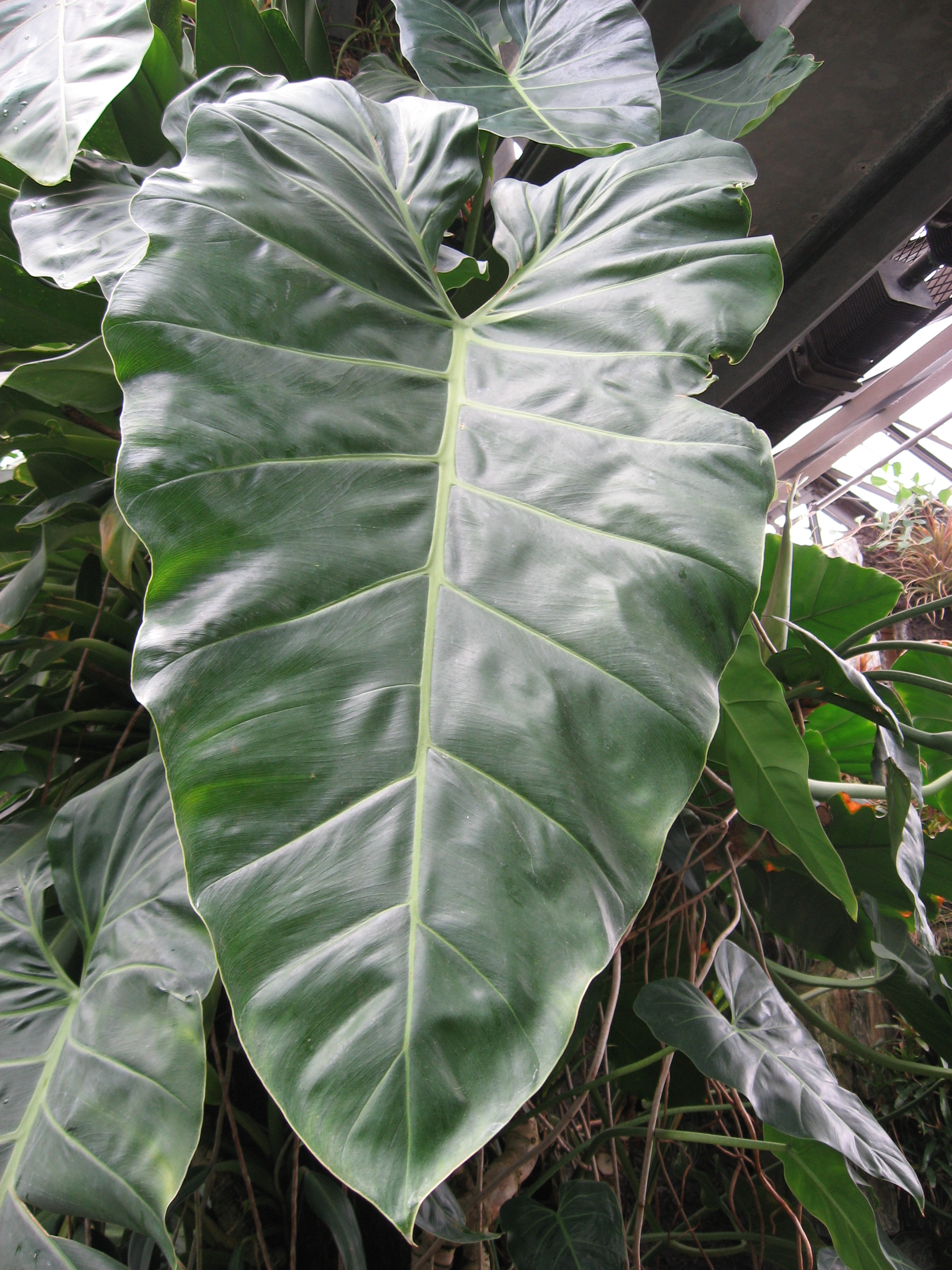

Scientific classification
- Kingdom: Plantae
- Clade: Tracheophytes
- Clade: Angiosperms
- Clade: Monocots
- Order: Alismatales
- Family: Araceae
- Genus: Philodendron
- Species: P. maximum

Binomial name
- Philodendron maximum K.Krause

= Philodendron maximum =

Species of flowering plant

Philodendron maximum is a species of flowering plant in the family Araceae. It is native to Bolivia, Ecuador, and western Brazil in the States of Acre and Mato Grosso.

== See also ==
- List of Philodendron species
