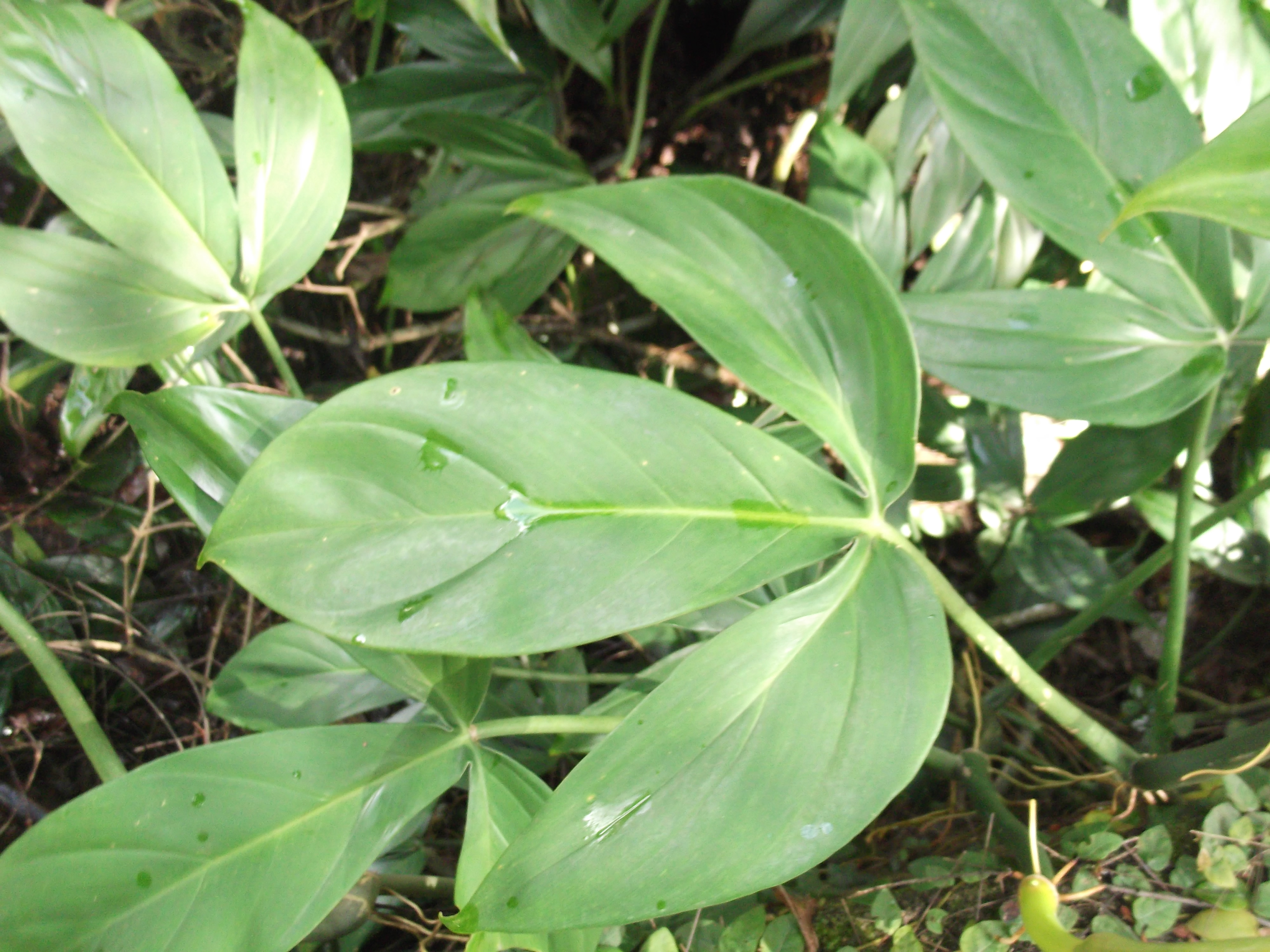
- In India
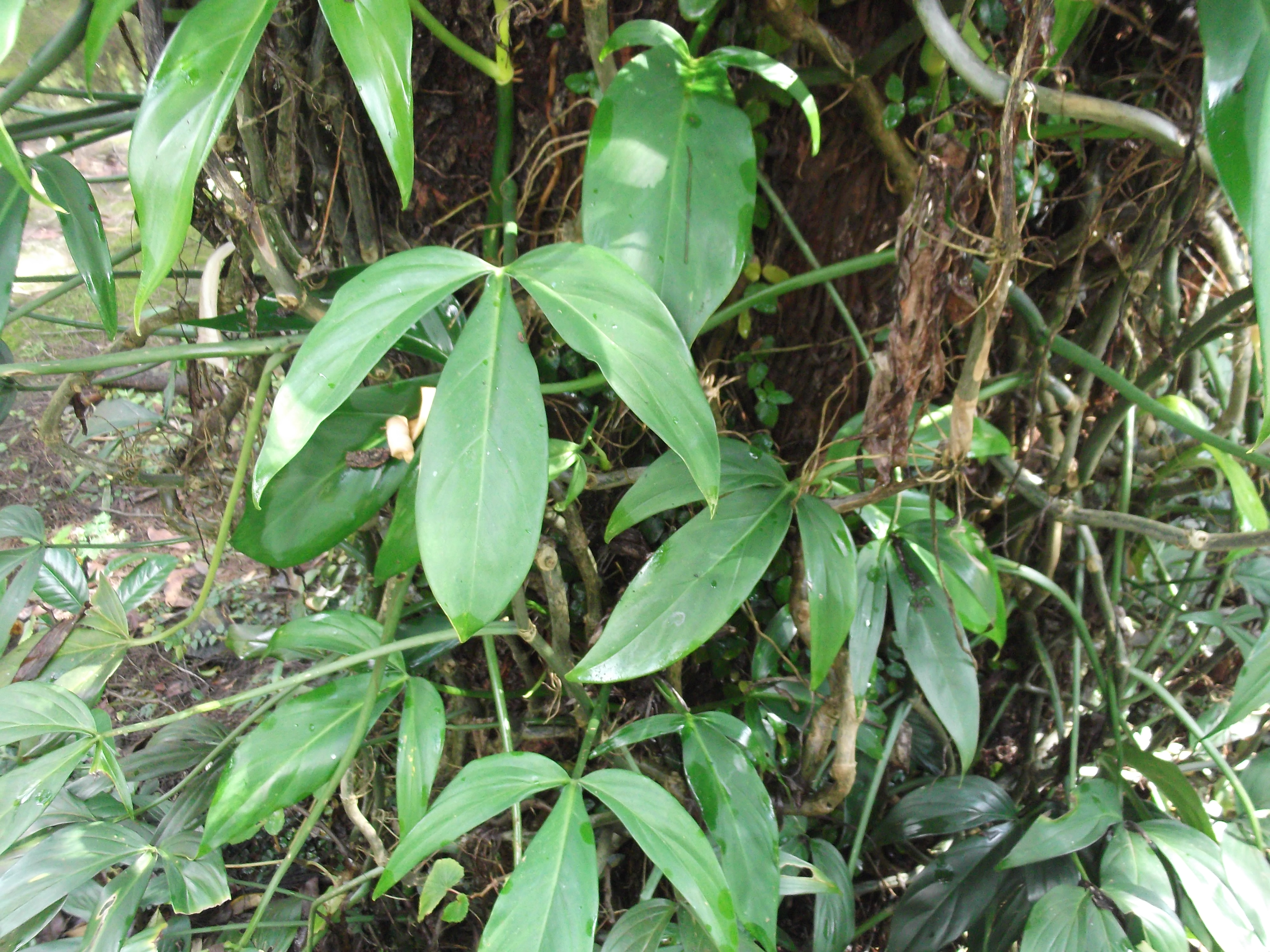
- Climbing habit

Scientific classification
- Kingdom: Plantae
- Clade: Tracheophytes
- Clade: Angiosperms
- Clade: Monocots
- Order: Alismatales
- Family: Araceae
- Genus: Philodendron
- Species: P. tripartitum

Binomial name
- Philodendron tripartitum (Jacq.) Schott

Synonyms
- List: Arum tripartitum Jacq.; Caladium trifoliatum Desf.; Caladium tripartitum (Jacq.) Willd.; Philodendron affine Hemsl.; Philodendron fenzlii Engl.; Philodendron holtonianum Mast.; Philodendron trilobatum Regel; Philodendron tripartitum var. tricuspidatum Engl.

= Philodendron tripartitum =

Species of plant

Philodendron tripartitum (syn. Philodendron fenzlii) is a species of flowering plant in the family Araceae. Some authorities continue to recognize Philodendron fenzlii as a valid species. It is native to southern Mexico, Central America, Jamaica, Colombia, Ecuador, Venezuela, and northern Brazil. A hemiepiphyte, it is typically found in the wet tropics at elevations from 0 to 1,300 m (0 to 4,000 ft), and in cultivation it is considered "very aggressive."
