= Philodendron linnaei =

Scientific classification
- Kingdom: Plantae
- Clade: Tracheophytes
- Clade: Angiosperms
- Clade: Monocots
- Order: Alismatales
- Family: Araceae
- Genus: Philodendron
- Species: P. linnaei

Binomial name
- Philodendron linnaei Kunth

Synonyms
- Philodendron decurrens K.Krause; Philodendron nobile W.Bull; Philodendron notabile W.Bull

Species of plant

Philodendron linnaei is a species of flowering plant in the family Araceae. It is native to wet tropical areas of South America. A hemi-epiphyte and climber with obovate leaves, it has found some use as a slow-growing houseplant. Its growth alternates between long, thin, leafless zones between much shorter and thicker zones with globular clusters of leaves.

== Subtaxa ==
The following varieties are accepted:

- Philodendron linnaei var. linnaei – entire range
- Philodendron linnaei var. rionegrense G.S.Bunting – Colombia, Venezuela
