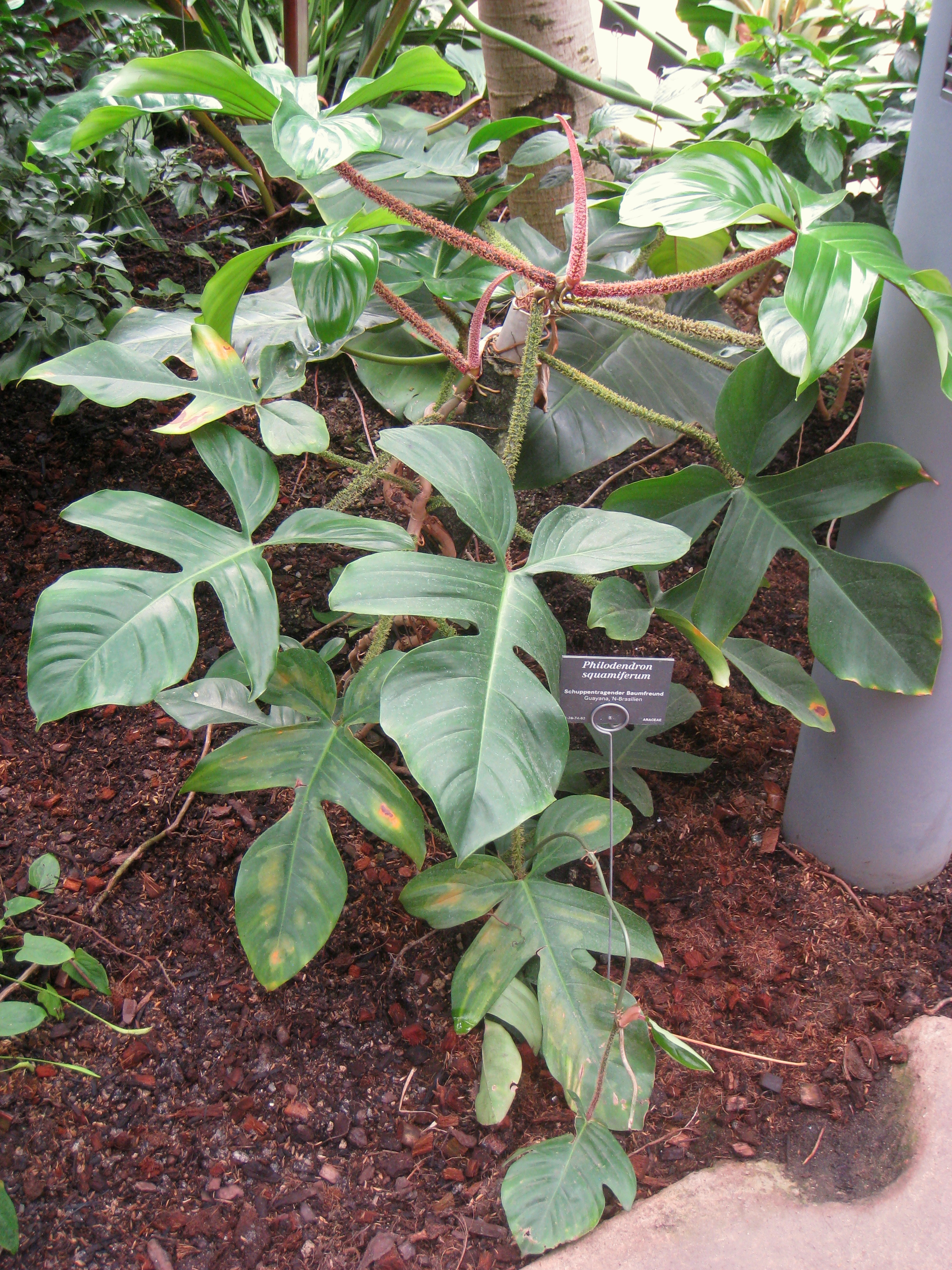

Scientific classification
- Kingdom: Plantae
- Clade: Tracheophytes
- Clade: Angiosperms
- Clade: Monocots
- Order: Alismatales
- Family: Araceae
- Genus: Philodendron
- Species: P. squamiferum

Binomial name
- Philodendron squamiferum Poepp. & Engl.

= Philodendron squamiferum =

Species of flowering plant

Philodendron squamiferum, known as Squamiferum for short, is a rare species of plant in the family Araceae, native to French Guiana, Suriname, and northern Brazil. This climbing plant has leaves with five lobes and has a climbing growth habit. It is well known among Philodendron species for its distinctive reddish stalks, which are covered in small bristles that give it a hairy appearance.

== Description ==
Philodendron squamiferum is a rare houseplant with unique five-lobed (five-partite) dark green leaves and a scaly reddish petiole.

== Toxicity ==
Philodendron squamiferum is toxic because of the presence of calcium oxalate crystals. Oxalate crystals can cause pain and swelling upon contact with the skin or mouth, and pain, swelling, hoarseness and difficulty swallowing if ingested.

== See also ==
- List of Philodendron species
