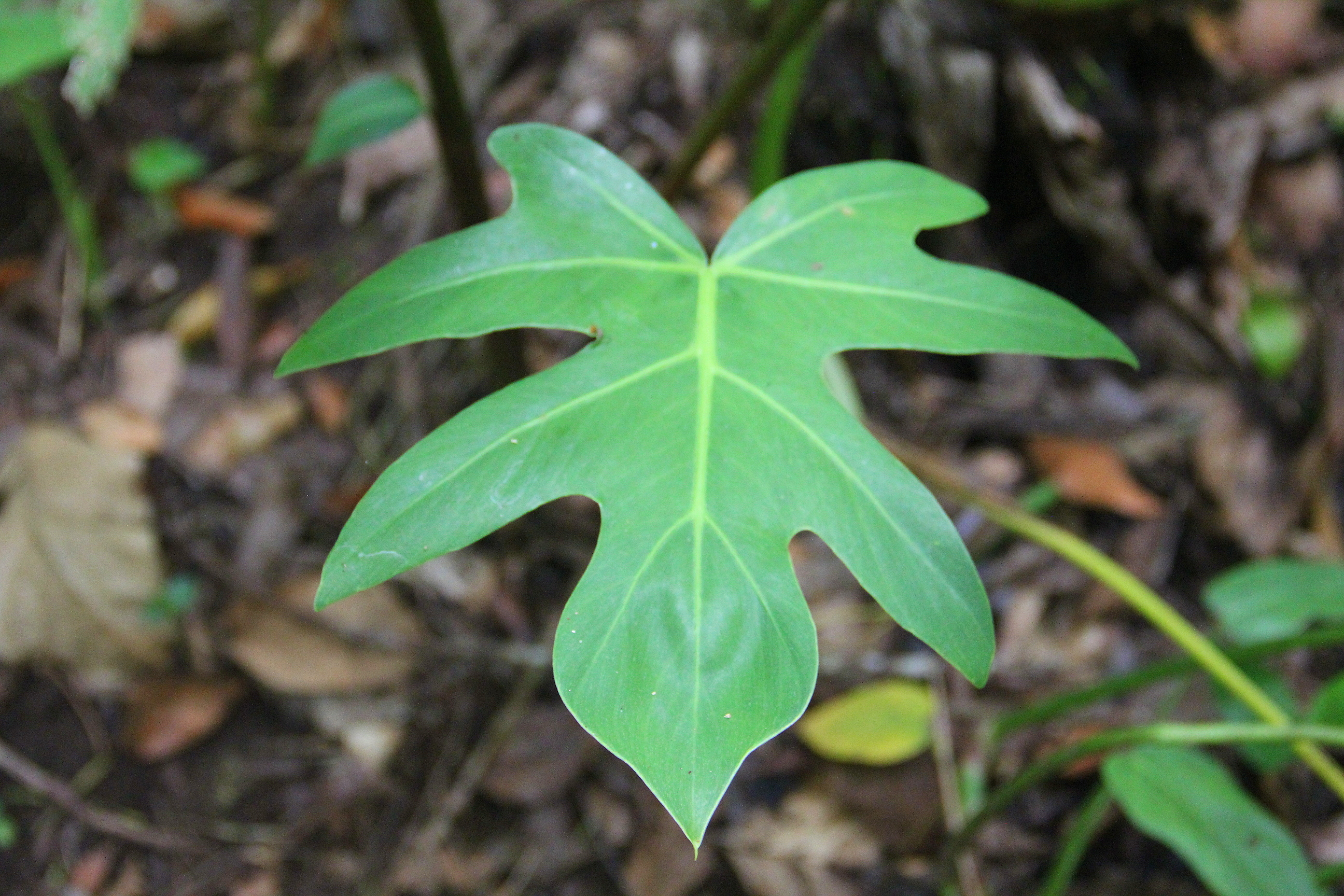

Scientific classification
- Kingdom: Plantae
- Clade: Tracheophytes
- Clade: Angiosperms
- Clade: Monocots
- Order: Alismatales
- Family: Araceae
- Genus: Philodendron
- Species: P. bipennifolium

Binomial name
- Philodendron bipennifolium Schott

= Philodendron bipennifolium =

Species of plant

Philodendron bipennifolium is a plant species commonly known as the "fiddle-leaf philodendron". The climbing plant is from Brazil and has leaves with five lobes.

== See also ==
- List of Philodendron species
