= Philodendron riparium =

Conservation status
- Vulnerable (IUCN 3.1)

Scientific classification
- Kingdom: Plantae
- Clade: Tracheophytes
- Clade: Angiosperms
- Clade: Monocots
- Order: Alismatales
- Family: Araceae
- Genus: Philodendron
- Species: P. riparium

Binomial name
- Philodendron riparium Engl.

Species of flowering plant

Philodendron riparium is a species of plant in the family Araceae.

It is endemic to Ecuador. Its natural habitats are subtropical or tropical moist lowland forests and subtropical or tropical moist montane forests. It is threatened by habitat loss.

== See also ==
- List of Philodendron species
