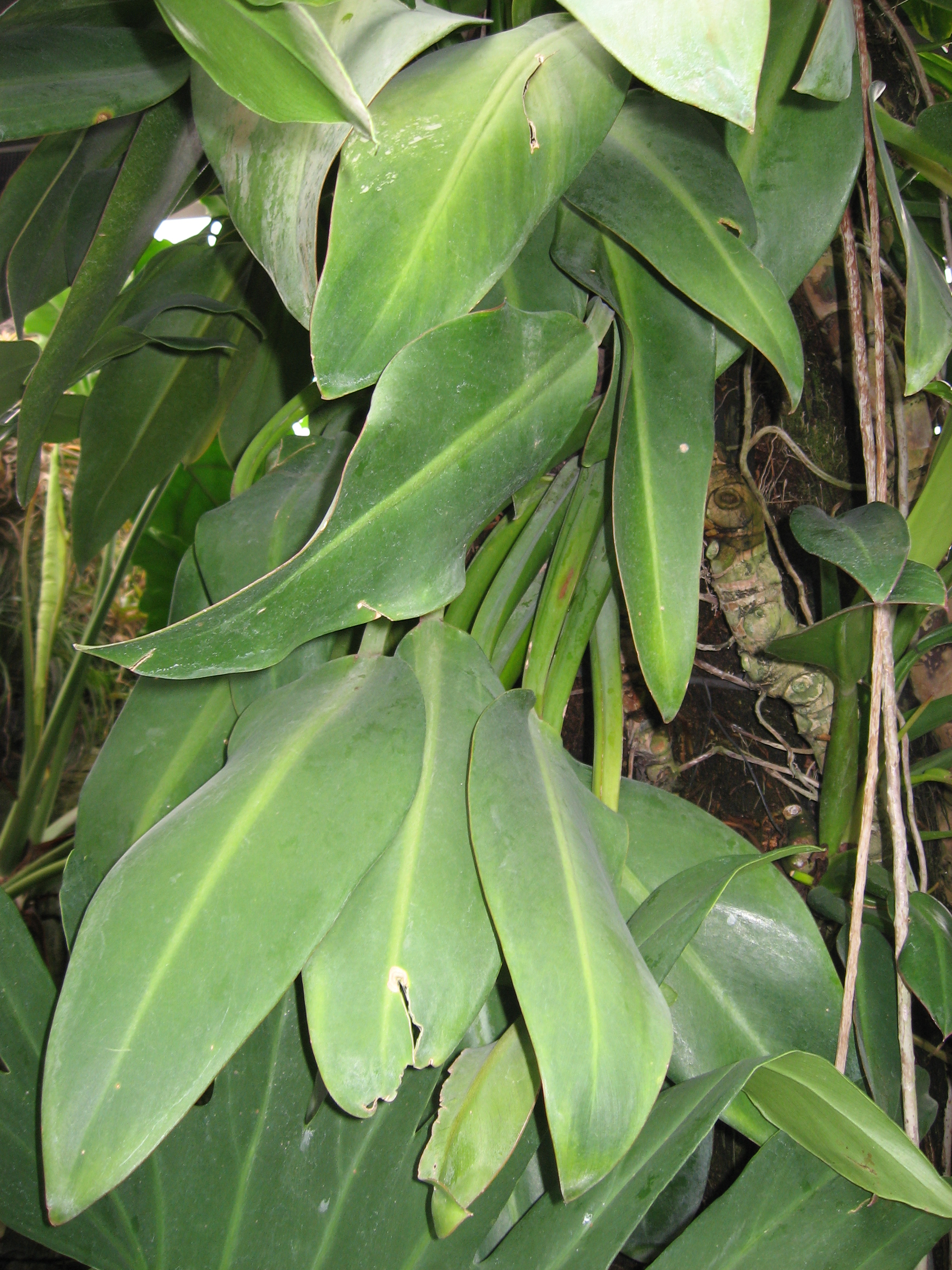

Scientific classification
- Kingdom: Plantae
- Clade: Tracheophytes
- Clade: Angiosperms
- Clade: Monocots
- Order: Alismatales
- Family: Araceae
- Genus: Philodendron
- Species: P. martianum

Binomial name
- Philodendron martianum Engl.

Synonyms
- Philodendron cannifolium Mart. ex Kunth; Caladium crassipes Engl.; Caladium macropus Kunth

= Philodendron martianum =

Species of flowering plant

Philodendron martianum, commonly known as pacová, is a species of plant in the family Araceae. It is native to southeastern Brazil.

== See also ==
- List of Philodendron species
