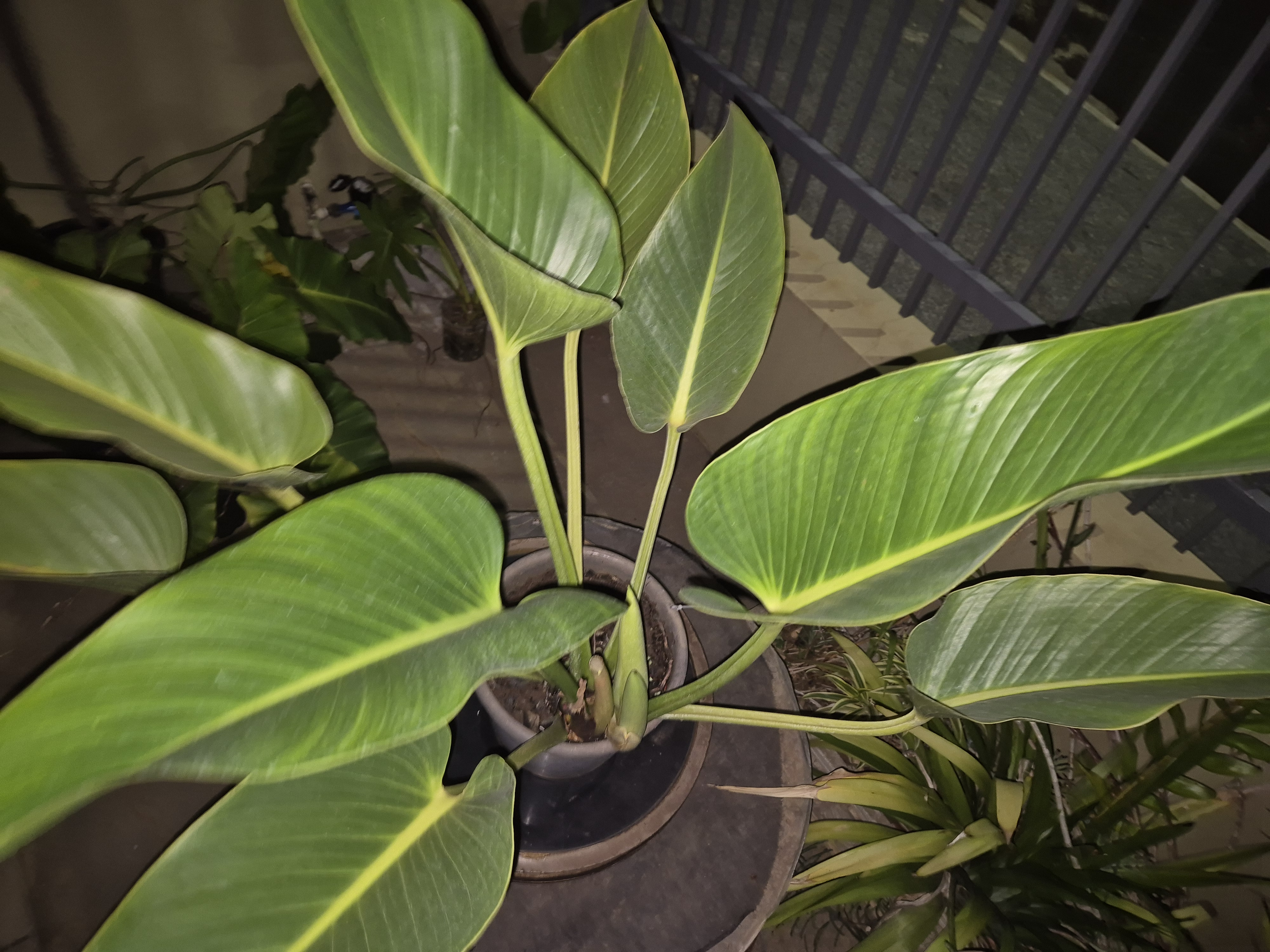

Scientific classification
- Kingdom: Plantae
- Clade: Tracheophytes
- Clade: Angiosperms
- Clade: Monocots
- Order: Alismatales
- Family: Araceae
- Genus: Philodendron
- Species: P. davidsonii

Binomial name
- Philodendron davidsonii Croat, 1983

= Philodendron davidsonii =

Species of flowering plant

Philodendron davidsonii is a flowering plant belonging to the genus Philodendron. It was first described by Thomas Bernard Croat.

== Summary Description ==
Epiphytic, climbing plant, found in nature in the canopy of trees, native to the humid forests of Costa Rica and adjacent Nicaragua and Panama. Leaves with deeply grooved petiole, entire, leathery blade, with prominently impressed veins. Erect inflorescences, 1 to 3 per peduncle, spathe light green in color, extremely purple on the inside.
