= Philodendron devansayeanum =

Scientific classification
- Kingdom: Plantae
- Clade: Tracheophytes
- Clade: Angiosperms
- Clade: Monocots
- Order: Alismatales
- Family: Araceae
- Genus: Philodendron
- Species: P. devansayeanum

Binomial name
- Philodendron devansayeanum L.Linden, 1895

Species of flowering plant

Philodendron devansayeanum is a species of flowering plant in the family Araceae. It is endemic to Peru.
