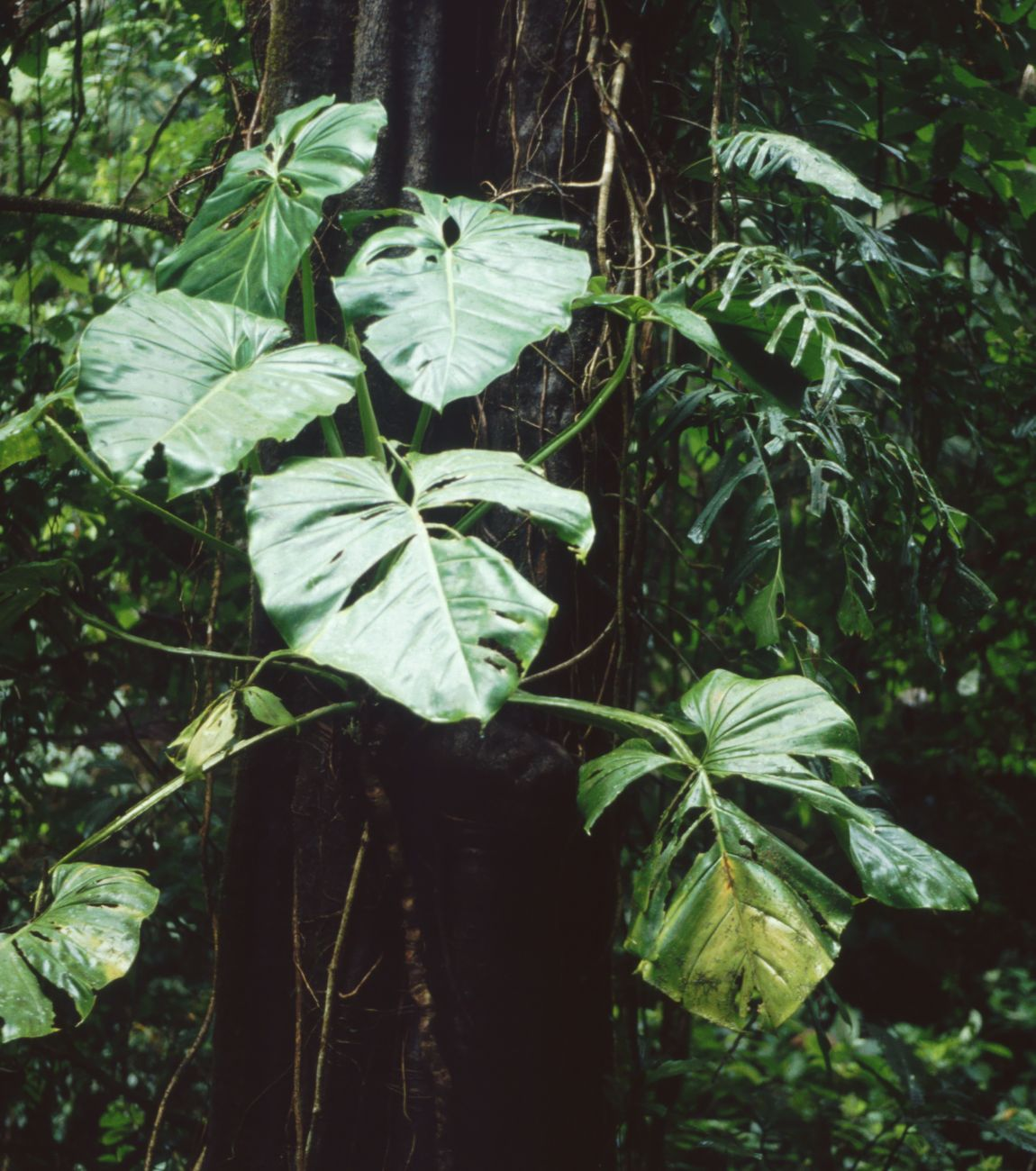
- In the wild in Costa Rica

Scientific classification
- Kingdom: Plantae
- Clade: Tracheophytes
- Clade: Angiosperms
- Clade: Monocots
- Order: Alismatales
- Family: Araceae
- Genus: Philodendron
- Species: P. pterotum

Binomial name
- Philodendron pterotum K.Koch & Augustin

Synonyms
- Philodendron mirificum Standl. & L.O.Williams

= Philodendron pterotum =

Species of plant

Philodendron pterotum, the winged philodendron (a name it shares with other members of its genus), is a species of flowering plant in the family Araceae. It is native to southern Central America. A climber with an unusual leaf structure for philodendrons, it is typically found in wet tropical forests.
