= Philodendron victoriae =

Scientific classification
- Kingdom: Plantae
- Clade: Tracheophytes
- Clade: Angiosperms
- Clade: Monocots
- Order: Alismatales
- Family: Araceae
- Genus: Philodendron
- Species: P. victoriae

Binomial name
- Philodendron victoriae G.S.Bunting

Species of plant

Philodendron victoriae is a species of flowering plant in the family Araceae. It is native to wet tropical biome areas ranging from SE Colombia to Venezuela.
