= Philodendron tatei =

Scientific classification
- Kingdom: Plantae
- Clade: Tracheophytes
- Clade: Angiosperms
- Clade: Monocots
- Order: Alismatales
- Family: Araceae
- Genus: Philodendron
- Species: P. tatei

Binomial name
- Philodendron tatei K.Krause

Synonyms
- Philodendron melanochlorum G.S.Bunting

Species of plant

Philodendron tatei is a species of flowering plant in the family Araceae. It is native to wet tropical areas of northern Brazil, Guyana, Peru, and Venezuela. A climber, there appears to be a cultivar, 'Congo'.

== Subtaxa ==
The following subspecies are accepted:

- Philodendron tatei subsp. melanochlorum (G.S.Bunting) G.S.Bunting – Peru, Venezuela
- Philodendron tatei subsp. tatei – Northern Brazil, Guyana, Venezuela
