= Philodendron ventricosum =

Conservation status
- Endangered (IUCN 3.1)

Scientific classification
- Kingdom: Plantae
- Clade: Tracheophytes
- Clade: Angiosperms
- Clade: Monocots
- Order: Alismatales
- Family: Araceae
- Genus: Philodendron
- Species: P. ventricosum

Binomial name
- Philodendron ventricosum Madison

Species of flowering plant

Philodendron ventricosum is a species of plant in the family Araceae. It is endemic to Ecuador. Its natural habitats are subtropical or tropical moist lowland forests and subtropical or tropical moist montane forests. It is threatened by habitat loss.

== See also ==
- List of Philodendron species
