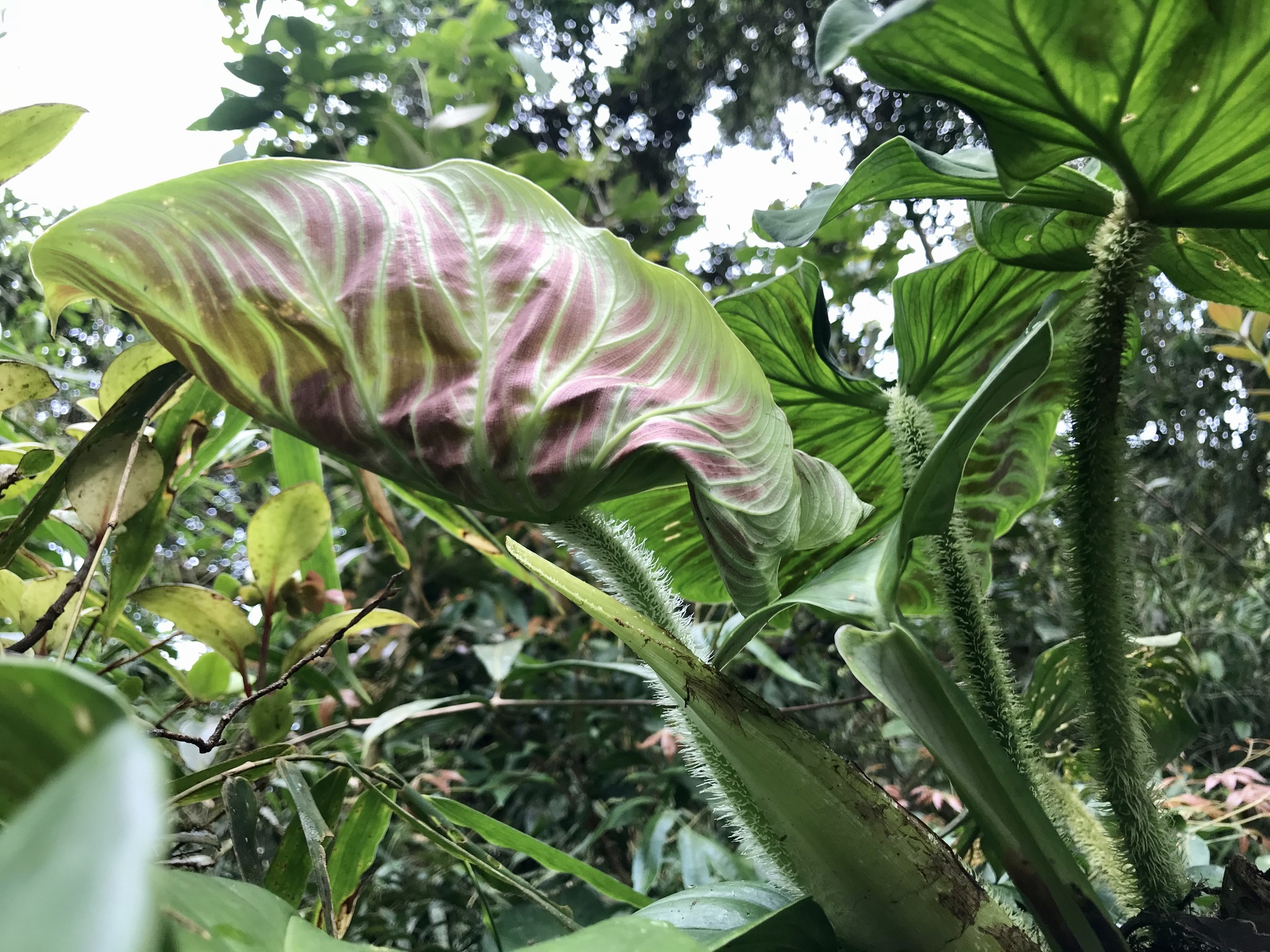
- Philodendron verrucosum

Scientific classification
- Kingdom: Plantae
- Clade: Tracheophytes
- Clade: Angiosperms
- Clade: Monocots
- Order: Alismatales
- Family: Araceae
- Genus: Philodendron
- Species: P. verrucosum

Binomial name
- Philodendron verrucosum L.Mathieu ex Schott

Synonyms
- Philodendron carderi T.Moore & Mast.; Philodendron daguense Linden & André; Philodendron discolor K.Krause; Philodendron lindenii Engl.; Philodendron pilatonense Engl.

= Philodendron verrucosum =

Species of flowering plant

Philodendron verrucosum is a species of flowering plant in the family Araceae. It is native to Costa Rica, Panama, Colombia, Ecuador and Peru, and is a hemiepiphyte climbing plant. This Philodendron is kept by houseplant collectors for its unique appearance, with foliage that has slightly wavy edges, white veins, and flushes of reddish hues, as well as hairy bristles along its petioles.

== See also ==
- List of Philodendron species
