= Philodendron duckei =

Scientific classification
- Kingdom: Plantae
- Clade: Tracheophytes
- Clade: Angiosperms
- Clade: Monocots
- Order: Alismatales
- Family: Araceae
- Genus: Philodendron
- Species: P. duckei

Binomial name
- Philodendron duckei Croat & Grayum

Species of flowering plant

Philodendron duckei is a plant species native to the French Guiana, Suriname and Brazil but cultivated as an ornamental elsewhere.

Philodendron duckei is terrestrial or hemiepiphytic. Stems are purplish-brown, round in cross-section but with ribs running longitudinally along the sides. Petioles are winged, up to 7 cm long. Leaf blades are up to 21 cm long, asymmetrical with one side wider than the other, dark green on the upper side, velvety on the under side. Flowers are borne in one spathe per leaf axil. Spathes are up to 8 cm long, with a spadix up to 8 cm long.

== See also ==
- List of Philodendron species
