= Philodendron carinatum =

Scientific classification
- Kingdom: Plantae
- Clade: Tracheophytes
- Clade: Angiosperms
- Clade: Monocots
- Order: Alismatales
- Family: Araceae
- Genus: Philodendron
- Species: P. carinatum

Binomial name
- Philodendron carinatum E.G.Gonç., 2005

Species of flowering plant

Philodendron carinatum is a flowering plant belonging to the genus Philodendron. It was first described by Eduardo G. Gonçalves.
