= Philodendron auriculatum =

Scientific classification
- Kingdom: Plantae
- Clade: Tracheophytes
- Clade: Angiosperms
- Clade: Monocots
- Order: Alismatales
- Family: Araceae
- Genus: Philodendron
- Species: P. auriculatum

Binomial name
- Philodendron auriculatum Standl. & L.O.Williams

Species of flowering plant

Philodendron auriculatum is a flowering plant belonging to the genus Philodendron. It was first described by Paul Carpenter Standley and Louis Otho Otto Williams.
