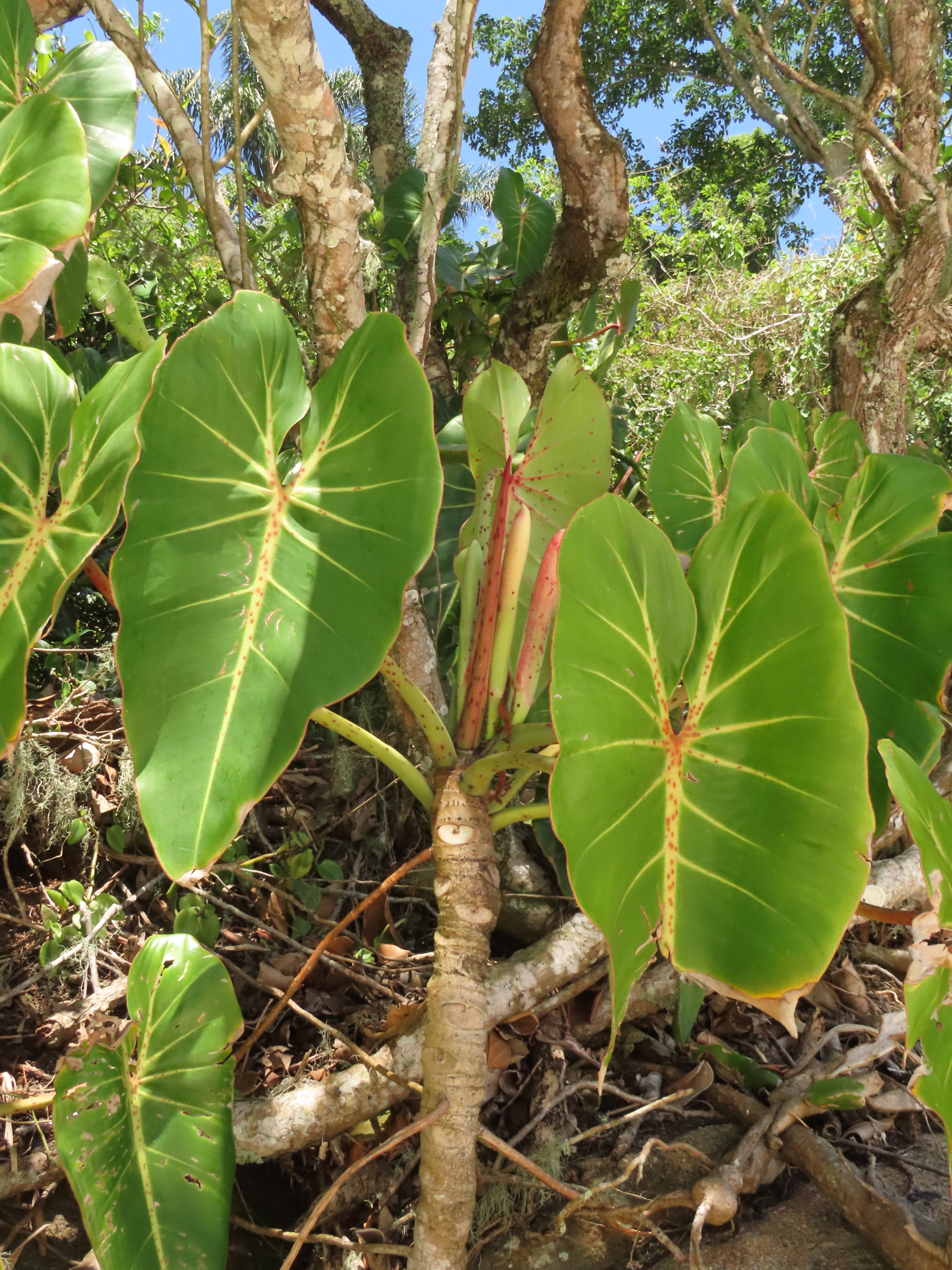
- Philodendron cordatum in Brazil

Scientific classification
- Kingdom: Plantae
- Clade: Embryophytes
- Clade: Tracheophytes
- Clade: Spermatophytes
- Clade: Angiosperms
- Clade: Monocots
- Order: Alismatales
- Family: Araceae
- Genus: Philodendron
- Species: P. cordatum

Binomial name
- Philodendron cordatum Kunth

= Philodendron cordatum =

Species of epiphyte

Philodendron cordatum is an uncommon species not often found or offered as a houseplant. It is native to a small region in Southeastern coastal Brazil, not far from Rio de Janeiro and São Paulo. It is an epiphytic and epilithic species of Philodendron (growing upon trees or rock outcroppings). This philodendron is typically a vining plant and can tolerate shade. It is toxic to humans and most animals if consumed. The toxic principle is calcium oxalate. It has heart-shaped, dark green leaves that generally grow 2″ to 3” across with white speckles on the more mature leaves. This species can easily be propagated by stem cutting by using water, soil, or sphagnum moss as a growing medium.

This name is often mistakenly applied to the popular houseplant Philodendron hederaceum, the ivy Philodendron. While "cordatum" means heart-shaped and both species have heart-shaped leaves, the species name cannot be applied to the ivy Philodendron.

== See also ==
- List of Philodendron species
