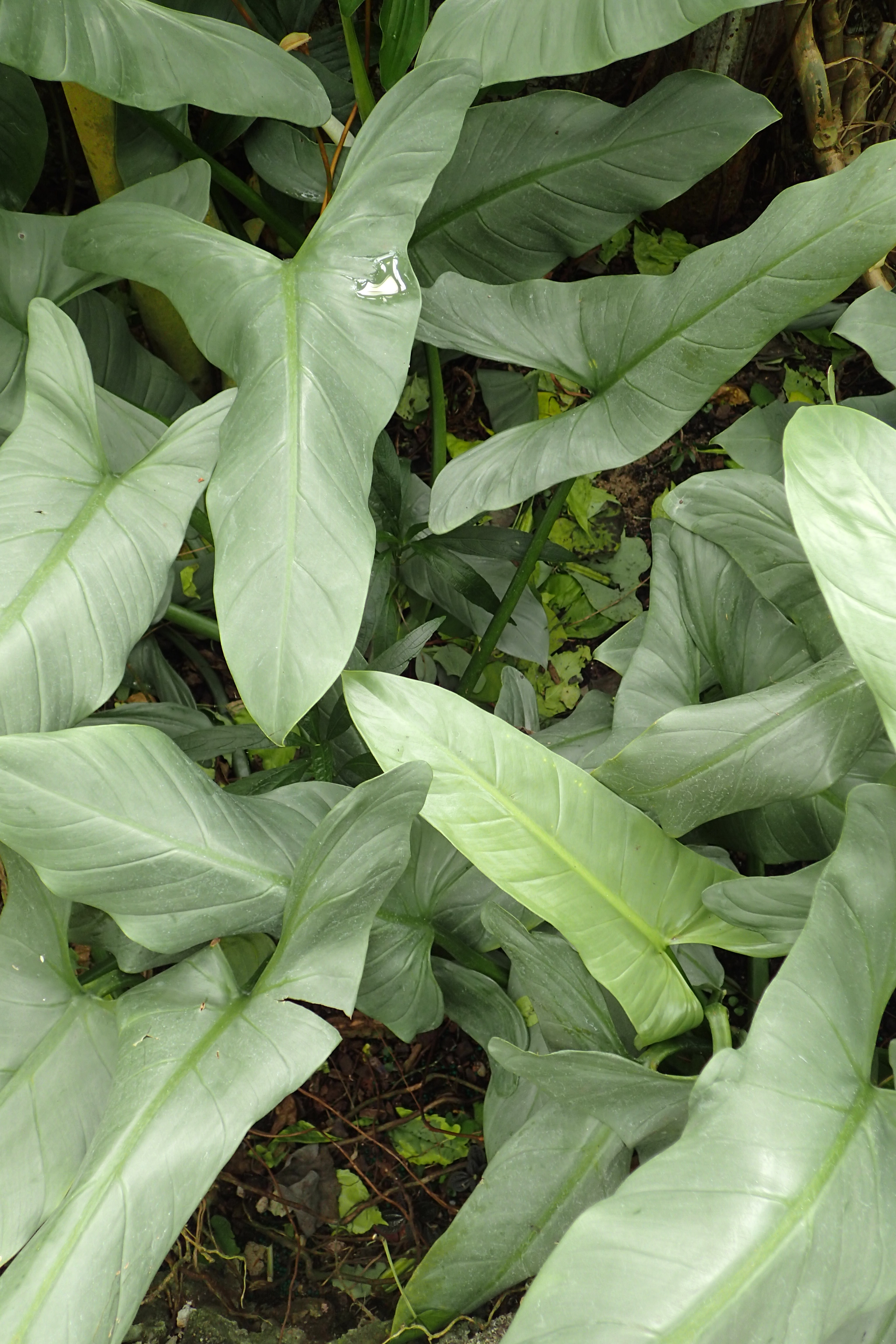
- Philodendron hastatum in the Lincoln Park Conservatory

Conservation status
- Least Concern (IUCN 3.1)

Scientific classification
- Kingdom: Plantae
- Clade: Tracheophytes
- Clade: Angiosperms
- Clade: Monocots
- Order: Alismatales
- Family: Araceae
- Genus: Philodendron
- Species: P. hastatum

Binomial name
- Philodendron hastatum K.Koch & Sello

Synonyms
- Philodendron disparile Schott; Philodendron elongatum Engl.; Philodendron hastifolium Regel; Philodendron simsii K.Koch

= Philodendron hastatum =

Species of flowering plant

Philodendron hastatum is a species of flowering plant in the family Araceae. The species has previously been known by synonyms such as Philodendron domesticum or other names, a confusion made worse by the large degree of morphological variation in this and similar Philodendrons. Commonly known as the silver sword philodendron, the plant is known for its silvery coloration, especially in juvenile leaves.
