= Philodendron cruentospathum =

Conservation status
- Critically Endangered (IUCN 3.1)

Scientific classification
- Kingdom: Plantae
- Clade: Tracheophytes
- Clade: Angiosperms
- Clade: Monocots
- Order: Alismatales
- Family: Araceae
- Genus: Philodendron
- Species: P. cruentospathum

Binomial name
- Philodendron cruentospathum Madison

Species of flowering plant

Philodendron cruentospathum is a species of plant in the family Araceae.

It is endemic to Ecuador. Its natural habitat is subtropical or tropical moist lowland forests. It is threatened by habitat loss.

== See also ==
- List of Philodendron species
