= Philodendron pachycaule =

Conservation status
- Data Deficient (IUCN 3.1)

Scientific classification
- Kingdom: Plantae
- Clade: Tracheophytes
- Clade: Angiosperms
- Clade: Monocots
- Order: Alismatales
- Family: Araceae
- Genus: Philodendron
- Species: P. pachycaule

Binomial name
- Philodendron pachycaule K.Krause

Species of flowering plant

Philodendron pachycaule is a species of flowering plant in the family Araceae. It is endemic to Ecuador. Its natural habitat is subtropical or tropical moist montane forests. It is threatened by habitat loss.

== See also ==
- List of Philodendron species
