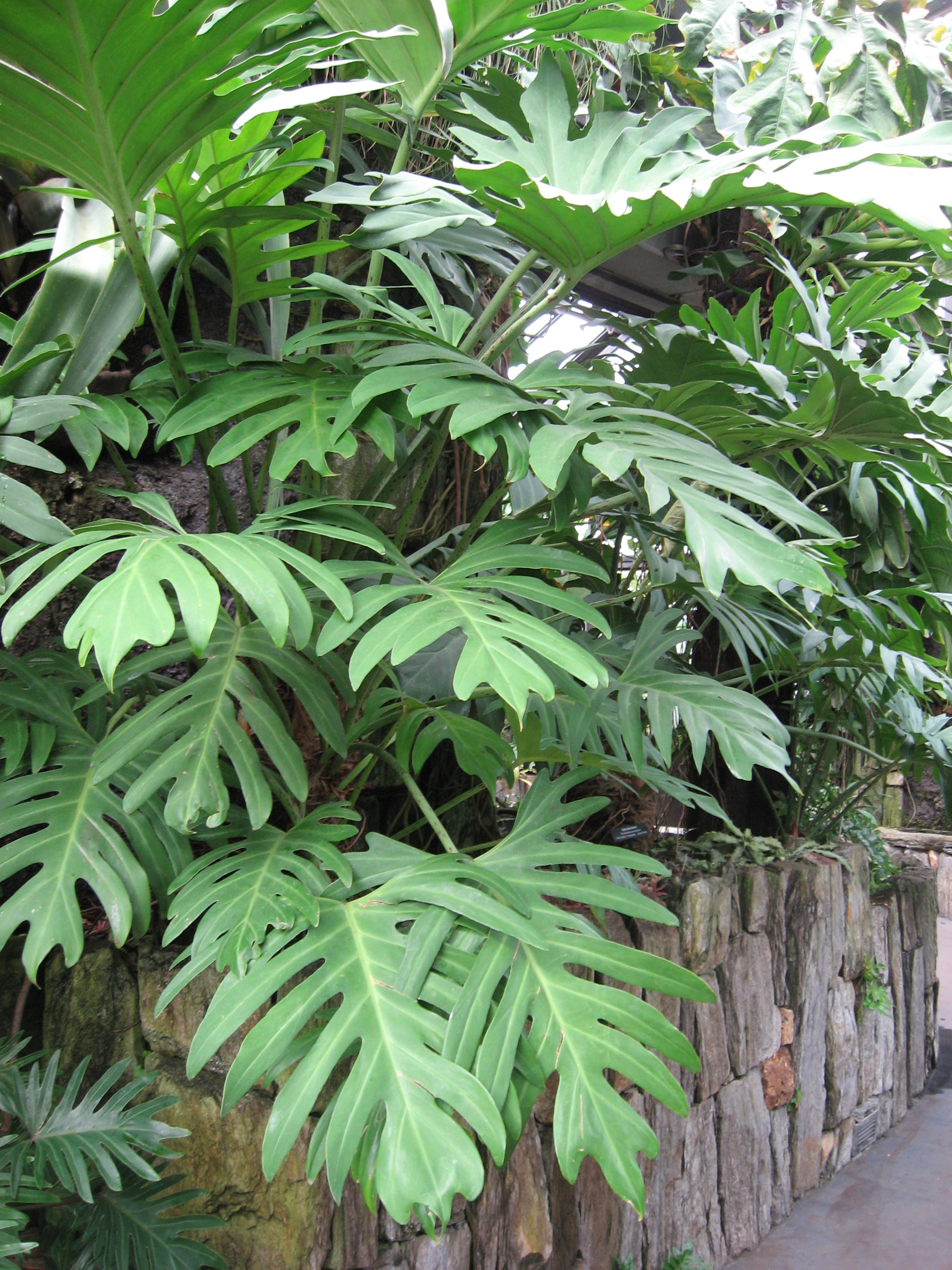

Scientific classification
- Kingdom: Plantae
- Clade: Tracheophytes
- Clade: Angiosperms
- Clade: Monocots
- Order: Alismatales
- Family: Araceae
- Genus: Philodendron
- Species: P. pinnatifidum

Binomial name
- Philodendron pinnatifidum Schott

= Philodendron pinnatifidum =

Species of flowering plant

Philodendron pinnatifidum, the comb-leaf philodendron, is a species of flowering plant in the Araceae. It is native to Venezuela (Bolívar, Aragua, Miranda, Distrito Federal) and northwestern Brazil, and reportedly naturalized in Cuba.

== See also ==
- List of Philodendron species
