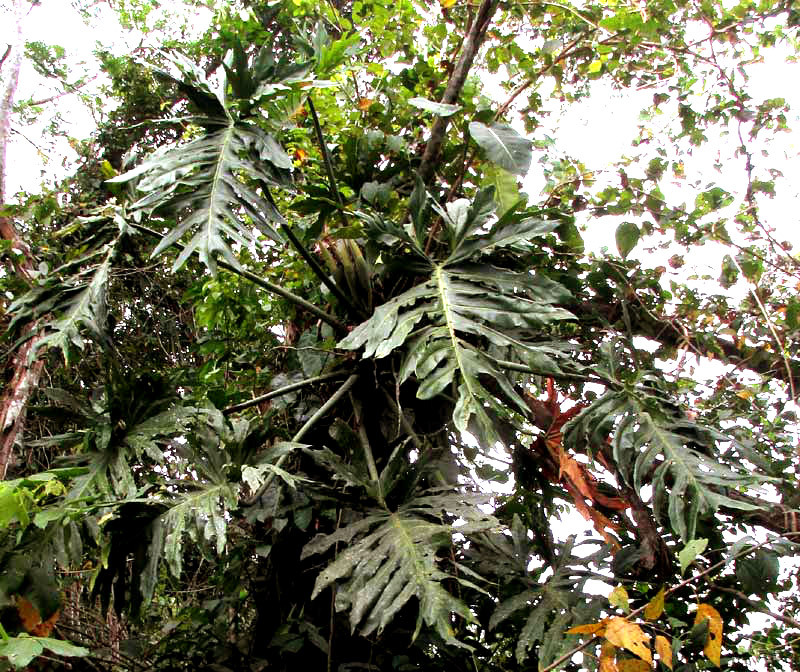

Scientific classification
- Kingdom: Plantae
- Clade: Tracheophytes
- Clade: Angiosperms
- Clade: Monocots
- Order: Alismatales
- Family: Araceae
- Genus: Philodendron
- Species: P. radiatum

Binomial name
- Philodendron radiatum Schott

= Philodendron radiatum =

Species of plant

Philodendron radiatum (called corija de pobre) is a rainforest vine in the family Araceae. It is found from southern Mexico southward to Panama. It is a root climber growing to a height of 25 m (82 ft). Its leaves are ovoid-triangular, and measure up to 1 m long by 1 m broad at the base, and often so deeply lobed as to almost be pinnate.

== See also ==
- List of Philodendron species
