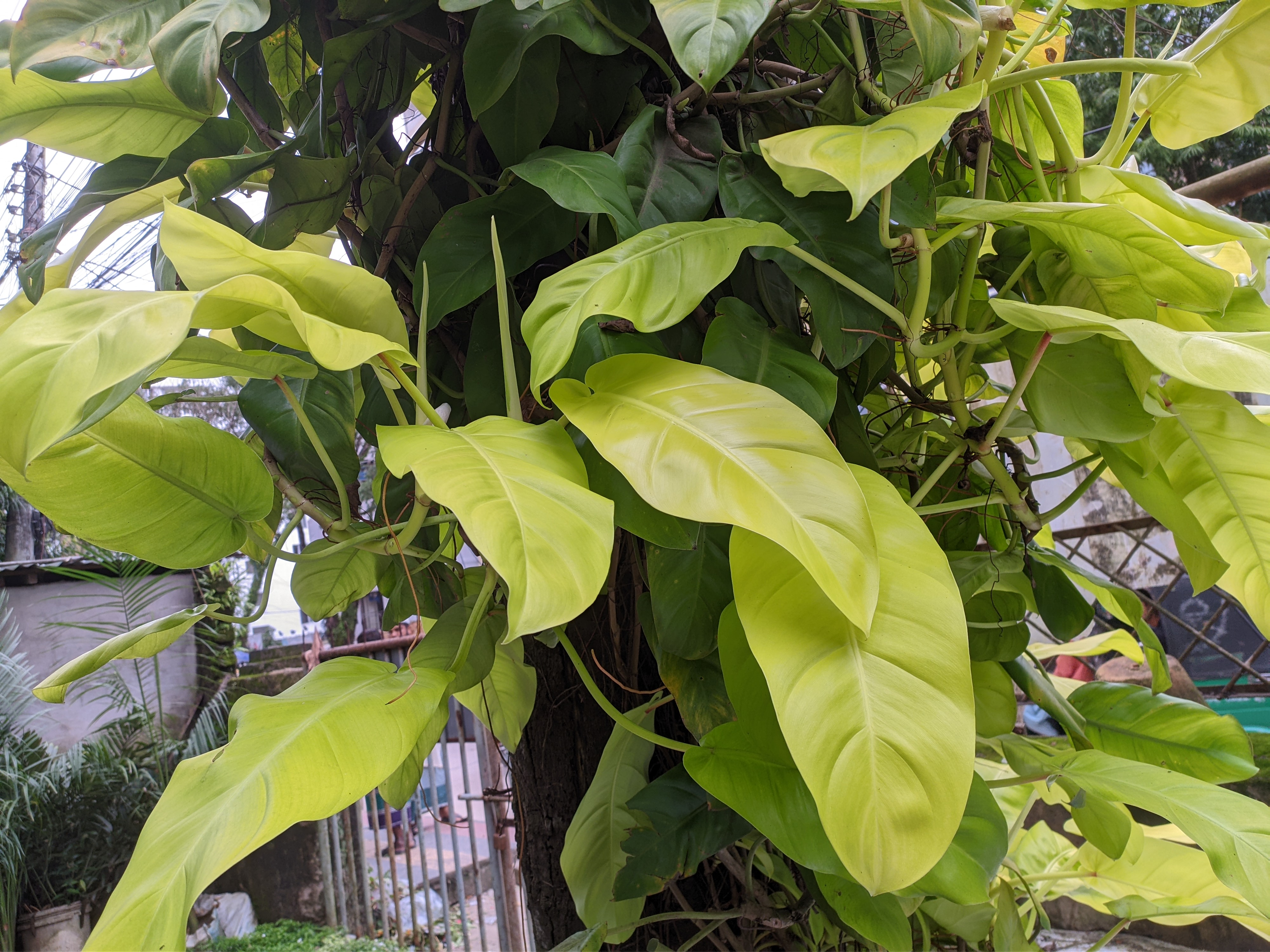
- Philodendron Domesticum var. Golden Goddess/Lemon Lime

Scientific classification
- Kingdom: Plantae
- Clade: Tracheophytes
- Clade: Angiosperms
- Clade: Monocots
- Order: Alismatales
- Family: Araceae
- Genus: Philodendron
- Species: P. domesticum

Binomial name
- Philodendron domesticum G.S.Bunting

= Philodendron domesticum =

Species of flowering plant

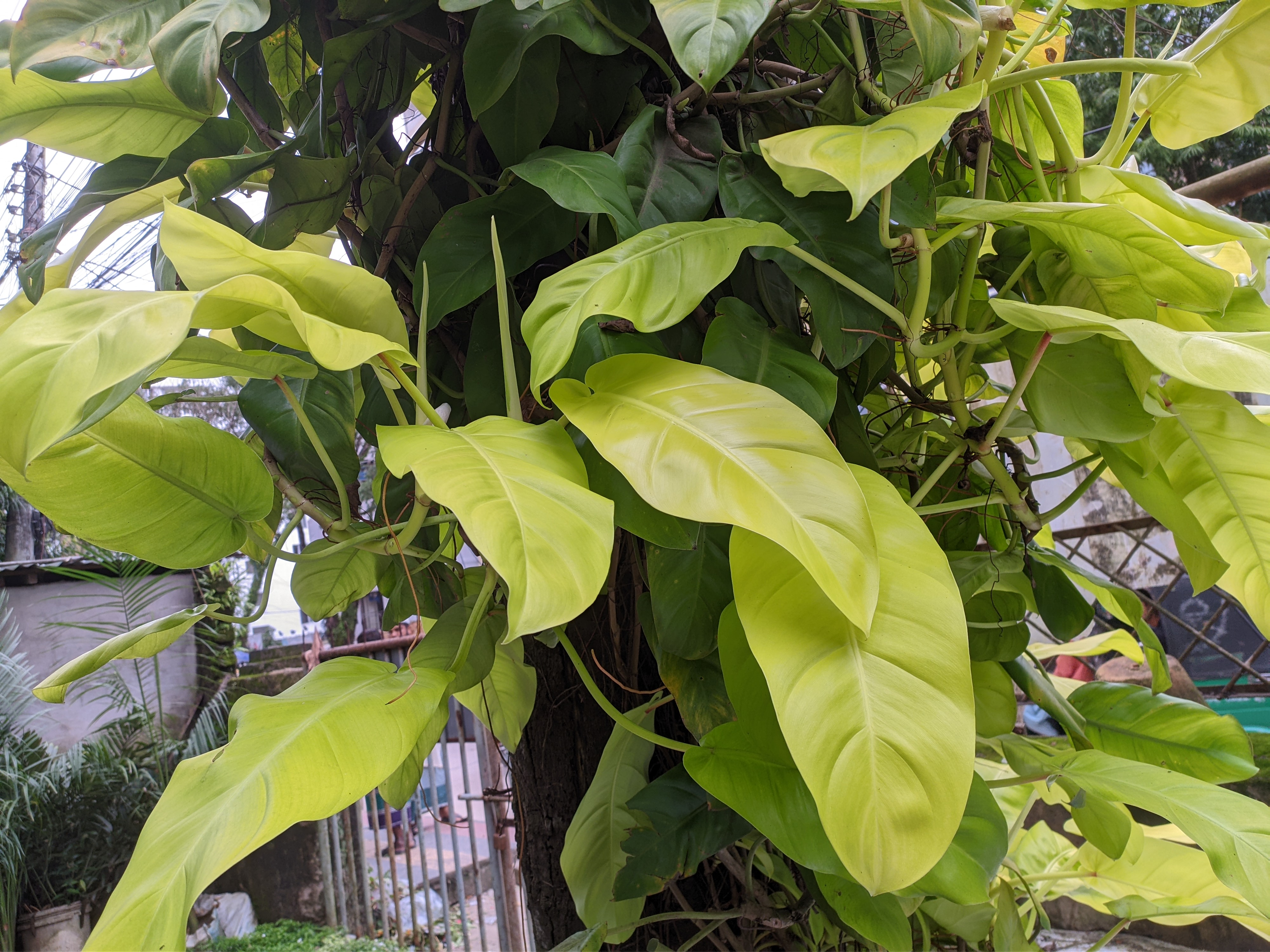
Philodendron hederaceum Lemon Lime **this is a philodendron Domesticum “Golden Goddess”/lemon lime**

Philodendron domesticum, also called the spadeleaf philodendron, the elephant ear philodendron, or burgundy philodendron, is a plant in the genus Philodendron. Its arrow-shaped glossy leaves grow to be 22 inches (56 cm) long and 9 inches (23 cm) wide when mature. Philodendron domesticum is also commonly grown as a houseplant in temperate climates.
