= Philodendron ensifolium =

Scientific classification
- Kingdom: Plantae
- Clade: Tracheophytes
- Clade: Angiosperms
- Clade: Monocots
- Order: Alismatales
- Family: Araceae
- Genus: Philodendron
- Species: P. ensifolium

Binomial name
- Philodendron ensifolium Croat & Grayum, 1992

Species of flowering plant

Philodendron ensifolium is a flowering plant belonging to the genus Philodendron. It was first described by Thomas Bernard Croat and Michael Howard Grayum.
