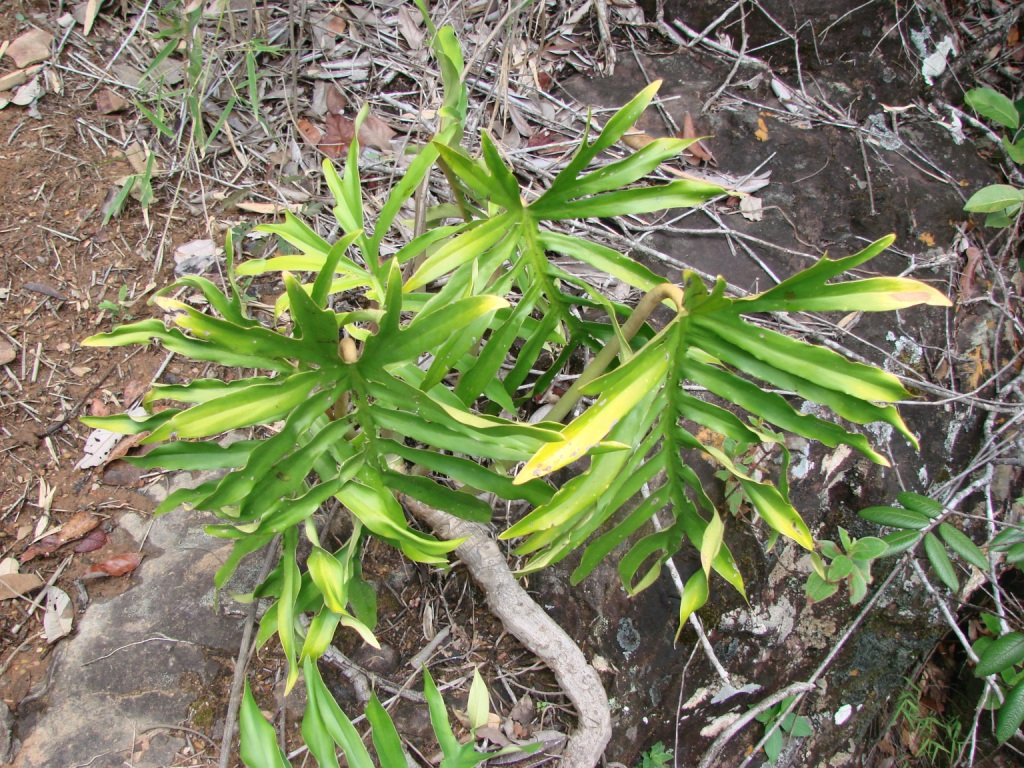
- In the Chapada Imperial, Brasília

Scientific classification
- Kingdom: Plantae
- Clade: Tracheophytes
- Clade: Angiosperms
- Clade: Monocots
- Order: Alismatales
- Family: Araceae
- Genus: Philodendron
- Species: P. mayoi

Binomial name
- Philodendron mayoi E.G.Gonç.

= Philodendron mayoi =

Species of plant

Philodendron mayoi is a species of flowering plant in the family Araceae. It is native to the Federal District (Brasília) and the state of Goiás. A scrambling subshrub, it is typically found in seasonally dry tropical ecoregions.

== See also ==
- List of Philodendron species
