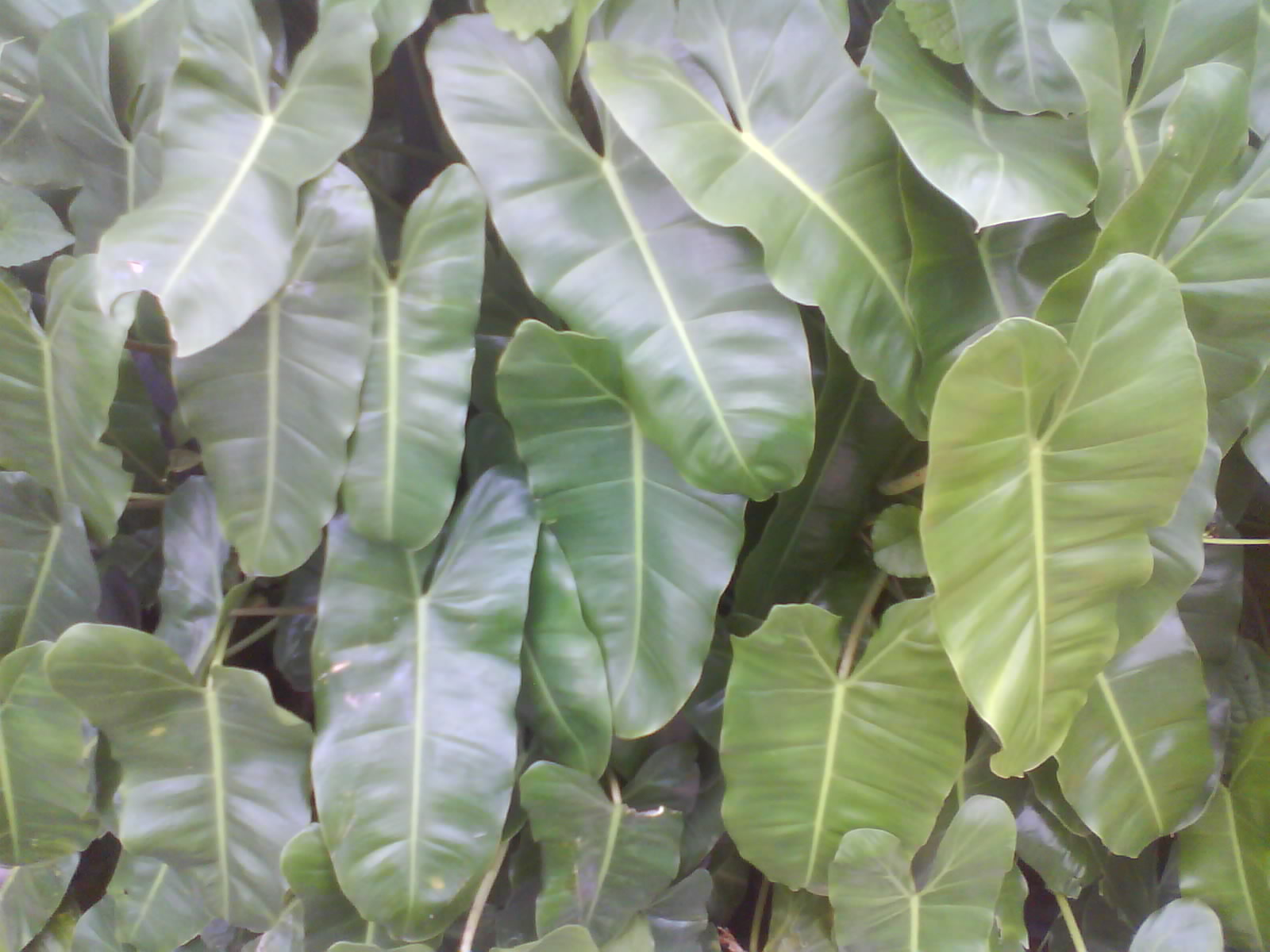
- Leaves of what is erroneously believed to be P. imbe
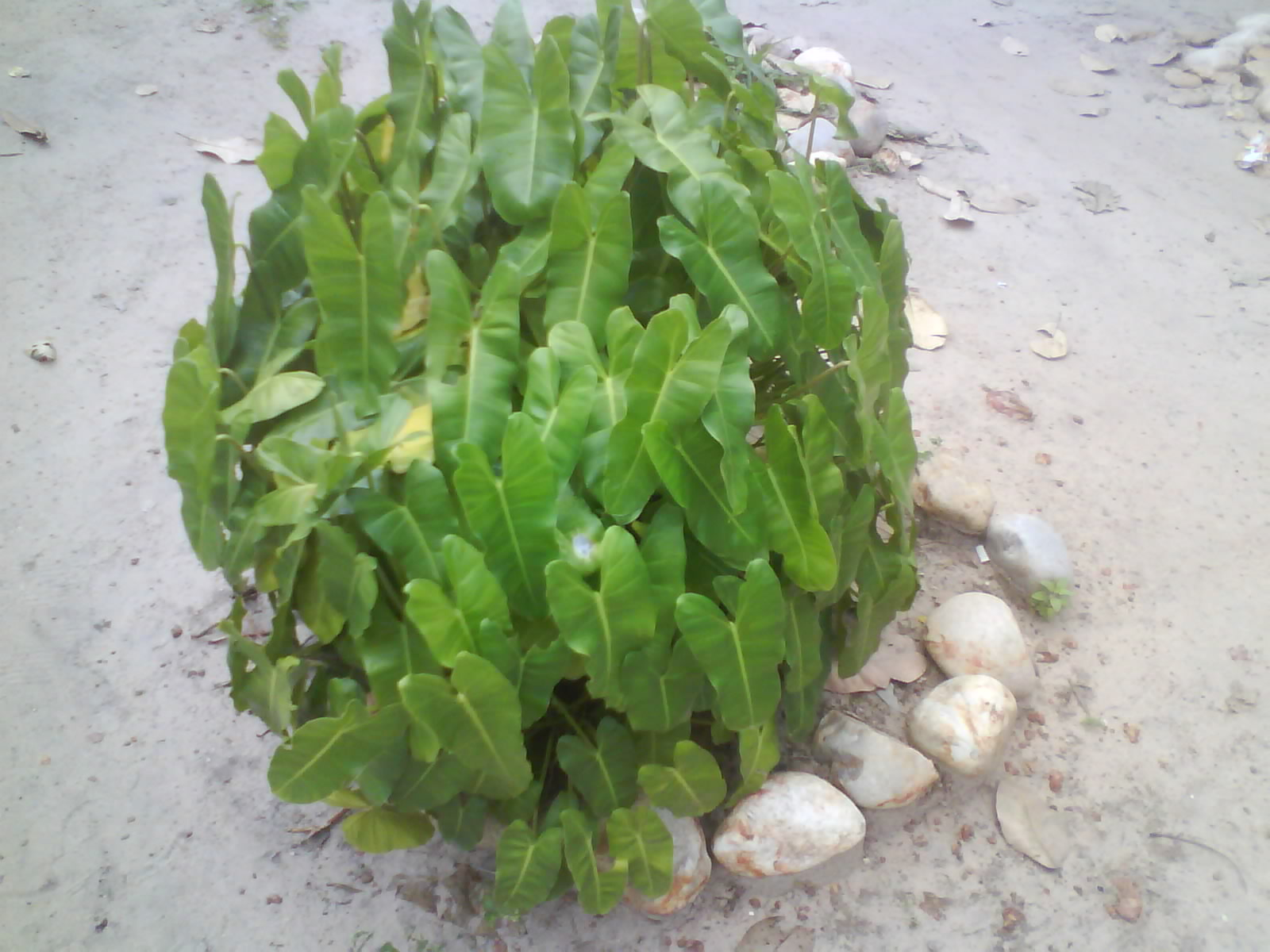
- A close relative misidentified as P. imbe at the Federal University of Ceará, Brazil

Scientific classification
- Kingdom: Plantae
- Clade: Tracheophytes
- Clade: Angiosperms
- Clade: Monocots
- Order: Alismatales
- Family: Araceae
- Genus: Philodendron
- Species: P. imbe

Binomial name
- Philodendron imbe Schott ex Kunth

Synonyms
- Caladium imbe Kunth; Calostigma imbe Schott; Philodendron callifolium Engl..; Philodendron sellowianum Kunth

= Philodendron imbe =

Species of plant

Philodendron imbe is a species of flowering plant in the family Araceae, thought to be extinct. A climber, it was endemic to the state of Rio de Janeiro in Brazil. Houseplants sold as Philodendron imbe are most likely Philodendron acutatum (syn. Philodendron quinquenervium), or perhaps P. appendiculatum.
