= Philodendron alliodorum =

Scientific classification
- Kingdom: Plantae
- Clade: Tracheophytes
- Clade: Angiosperms
- Clade: Monocots
- Order: Alismatales
- Family: Araceae
- Genus: Philodendron
- Species: P. alliodorum

Binomial name
- Philodendron alliodorum Croat & Grayum

Species of flowering plant

Philodendron alliodorum is a species of flowering plant in the genus Philodendron. It was first described by Thomas Bernard Croat and Michael Howard Grayum.
