= Philodendron eximium =

Scientific classification
- Kingdom: Plantae
- Clade: Tracheophytes
- Clade: Angiosperms
- Clade: Monocots
- Order: Alismatales
- Family: Araceae
- Genus: Philodendron
- Species: P. eximium

Binomial name
- Philodendron eximium Schott

Synonyms
- Philodendron sauerianum K.Koch; Philodendron eximium cardiophyllum (K.Koch & Sello) Engl. Philodendron cardiophyllum K.Koch & Sello; Philodendron amphibium (Vell.) Kunth ex Stellfeld; Philodendron amphibium Vell.

Species of flowering plant

Philodendron eximium is a flowering plant belonging to the genus Philodendron. It was first described by Heinrich Wilhelm Schott.
