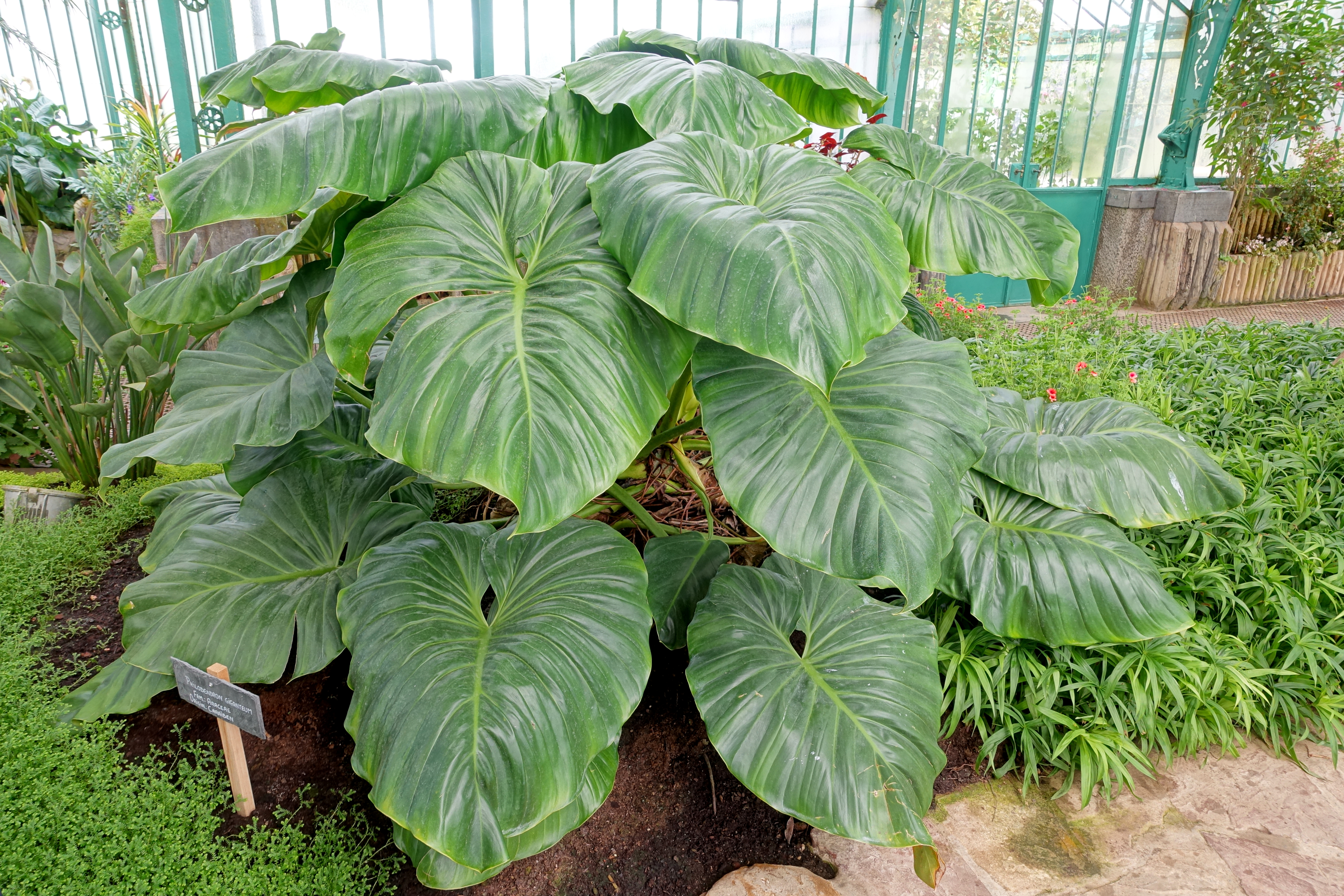
- Philodendron giganteum, one of the largest Philodendron species

Scientific classification
- Kingdom: Plantae
- Clade: Tracheophytes
- Clade: Angiosperms
- Clade: Monocots
- Order: Alismatales
- Family: Araceae
- Subfamily: Aroideae
- Tribe: Philodendreae
- Genus: Philodendron; Schott

Synonyms
- Arosma Raf.; Baursea (Rchb.) Hoffmanns. ex Kuntze; Calostigma Schott 1832, not validly published; Elopium Schott; Meconostigma Schott; Sphincterostigma Schott; Telipodus Raf.

= Philodendron =

Genus of flowering plants

Philodendron is a large genus of flowering plants in the family Araceae. As of September 2025, the Plants of the World Online accepted 625 species; other sources accept different numbers. Regardless of number of species, the genus is the second-largest member of the family Araceae, after genus Anthurium. Taxonomically, the genus Philodendron is still poorly known, with many undescribed species. Many are grown as ornamental and indoor plants. The name derives from the Greek words philo- 'love, affection' and dendron 'tree'. The generic name, Philodendron, is often used as the English name.

== Description ==
=== Growth habit ===
Compared to other genera of the family Araceae, philodendrons have an extremely diverse array of growth methods. The habits of growth can be epiphytic, hemiepiphytic, or rarely terrestrial. Others can show a combination of these growth habits depending on the environment. Hemiepiphytic philodendrons can be classified into two types: primary and secondary hemiepiphytes. A primary hemiepiphytic philodendron starts life high up in the canopy where the seed initially sprouts. The plant then grows as an epiphyte. Once it has reached a sufficient size and age, it will begin producing aerial roots that grow toward the forest floor. Once they reach the forest floor, nutrients can be obtained directly from the soil. In this manner, the plant's strategy is to obtain light early in its life at the expense of nutrients. Some primary epiphytic species have a symbiotic relationship with ants. In these species, the ants' nest is grown amongst the plant's roots, which help keep the nest together. Philodendrons have extrafloral nectaries, glands that secrete nectar to attract the ants. The philodendron, in turn, obtains nutrients from the surrounding ant nest, and the aggressive nature of the ants serves to protect the plant from other insects which would eat it.

Secondary hemiepiphytes start life on the ground or on part of a tree trunk very close to the ground, where the seeds sprout. These philodendrons have their roots in the ground early in their lives. They then begin climbing up a tree and eventually may become completely epiphytic, doing away with their subterranean roots. Secondary hemiepiphytes do not always start their lives close to a tree. For these philodendrons, the plant will grow with long internodes along the ground until a tree is found. They find a suitable tree by growing towards darker areas, such as the dark shadow of a tree. This trait is called scototropism. After a tree has been found, the scototropic behavior stops and the philodendron switches to a phototropic growth habit and the internodes shorten and thicken. Usually, however, philodendrons germinate on trees. A few species, such as Philodendron fragrantissimum switch repeatedly between globular clumps of leaves with very short internodes and naked internodes of uncommon length (up to a meter or more) followed by another clump and so on. Philodendron linnaei is another such species.

A few species show three peaks in temperature during flowering, which stimulates beetles within the spathe and increasing the likelihood they will be sufficiently coated with pollen. A sticky resin is also produced in drops attached to the spadix which help to keep the pollen attached to the beetles. This resin producing quality is unique to Philodendron and Monstera, as other genera of Araceae do not produce it on their spadices. The resin is also found on the stems, leaves, and roots of philodendrons. Its color can be red, orange, yellow, or colorless when it is first produced. Yet, over time, it will turn brown as it is exposed to air. Also, some evidence suggests the thermogenesis triggers the beetles to mate. It also appears to distribute the pheromones into the air. The reason for the spadix being held at 45° relative to the spathe may be to maximize the heat's ability to waft the pheromones into the air. Oxidizing stored carbohydrates and lipids has been found to be the energy source for thermogenesis. The part of the spadix that heats up is the sterile zone. As it heats up, carbohydrates are used, but once the spadix has reached its maximum temperature, lipids are oxidized. The lipids are not first converted to carbohydrates, but rather are directly oxidized. The thermogenic reaction is triggered when concentrations of acetosalicytic acid form in the sterile zone. The acid sets off the mitochondria in the cells that make up the sterile zone to switch to an electron transport chain called the cyanide-resistant pathway, which results in the production of heat. Philodendrons consume oxygen during thermogenesis. The rate at which oxygen is used is remarkably high, close to that of hummingbirds and sphinx moths. The spadix has been shown to generate infrared radiation.

=== Leaves ===
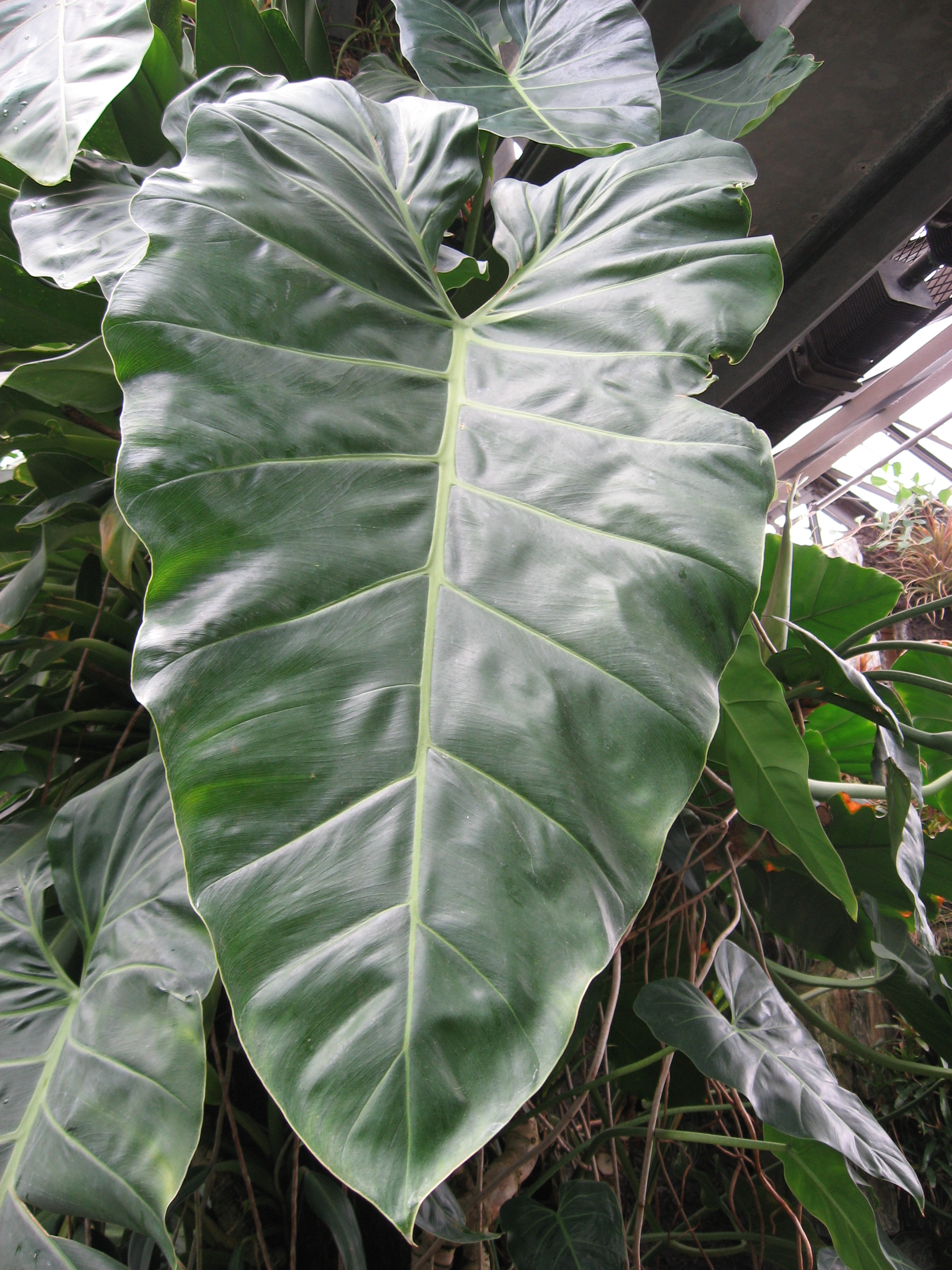
A leaf of Philodendron maximum

The leaves are usually large and imposing, often lobed or deeply cut, and may be more or less pinnate. They can also be oval (Philodendron 'White Princess'), spear-shaped, divided (Philodendron tripartitum) or in many other possible shape variations. The leaves are borne alternately on the stem. A quality of philodendrons is that they do not have a single type of leaf on the same plant. Instead, they have juvenile leaves and adult leaves, which can be drastically different from one another. The leaves of seedling philodendrons are usually heart-shaped early in the life of the plant. But after it has matured past the seedling stage, the leaves will acquire the typical juvenile leaf's shape and size. Later in the philodendron's life, it starts producing adult leaves, a process called metamorphosis. Most philodendrons go through metamorphosis gradually; there is no immediately distinct difference between juvenile and adult leaves. Aside from being typically much bigger than the juvenile leaves, the shape of adult leaves can be significantly different. In fact, considerable taxonomic difficulty has occurred in the past due to these differences, causing juvenile and adult plants to mistakenly be classified as different species.

The trigger for the transformation to adult leaves can vary considerably. One possible trigger is the height of the plant. Secondary hemiepiphytes start off on the dark forest floor and climb their way up a tree, displaying their juvenile type leaves along the way. Once they reach a sufficient height, they begin developing adult type leaves. The smaller juvenile leaves are used for the darker forest floor where light is in scarce supply, but once they reach a sufficient height in the canopy the light is bright enough that the bigger adult leaves can serve a useful purpose. Another possible trigger occurs in primary hemiepiphytes. These philodendrons typically send their aerial roots downward. Once their roots have reached the ground below, the plant will begin taking up nutrients from the soil, of which it had been previously deprived. As a result, the plant will quickly morph into its adult leaves and gain in size dramatically. Another quality of philodendrons leaves is they are often quite different in shape and size even between two plants of the same species. As a result of all these different possible leaf shapes, it is often difficult to differentiate natural variations from morphogenesis.

=== Cataphylls ===
Philodendrons also produce cataphylls, which are modified leaves that surround and protect the newly forming leaves. Cataphylls are usually green, leaf-like, and rigid while they are protecting the leaf. In some species, they can even be rather succulent. Once the leaf has been fully formed, the cataphyll usually remains attached where the stem and base of the leaf meet. In philodendrons, cataphylls typically fall into two categories: deciduous and persistent types. A deciduous cataphyll curls away from the leaf once it has formed, eventually turning brown and drying out, and finally falling off the plant, leaving a scar on the stem where it was attached. Deciduous cataphylls are typically found on vining philodendrons, whereas persistent cataphylls are typical of epiphytic philodendrons or appressed climbers. In the latter, the cataphylls are prevented from falling off in a timely manner due to the short internodes of the plant. The cataphylls will remain attached, drying out and becoming nothing more than fibers attached at the nodes. In some philodendrons, the cataphylls build up over time and eventually form a wet mass at the nodes. This may keep emerging roots moist and provide some form of lubrication to new leaves.

=== Roots ===
Philodendrons have both aerial and subterranean roots. The aerial roots occur in many shapes and sizes and originate from most of the plant's nodes or occasionally from an internode. The size and number of aerial roots per node depends on the presence of a suitable substrate for the roots to attach themselves. Aerial roots serve two primary purposes. They allow the philodendron to attach itself to a tree or other plant, and they allow it to collect water and nutrients. As such, the roots are divided morphologically into these two categories. Aerial roots used for attaching to trees tend to be shorter, more numerous, and sometimes have a layer of root hairs attached; those used for collecting water and nutrients tend to be thicker and longer. These feeder roots tend to attach flush with the substrate to which the philodendron is attached, and make their way directly downwards in search of soil. In general, feeder roots tend to show both positive hydrotropic and negative heliotropic behaviors. Characteristic of roots in philodendrons is the presence of a sclerotic hypodermis, which are cylindrical tubes inside the epidermis that can be one to five cells long. The cells that line the sclerotic hypodermis are elongated and tend to be hardened. Underneath the epidermis is a unique layer of cells in a pattern of long cells followed by short cells.

=== Extrafloral nectaries ===
Some philodendrons have extrafloral nectaries (nectar-producing glands found outside of the flowers). The nectar attracts ants, with which the plant enjoys a protective symbiotic relationship. Nectaries can be found in a variety of locations on the plant, including the stalks, sheaths, lower surfaces of the leaves, and spathes. The nectaries produce a sweet, sticky substance the ants like to eat and which provides an incentive for them to build their nests amongst the roots of the given philodendron. In some cases, the amount of nectar produced can be quite extensive, resulting in the surface becoming entirely covered with it.

== Reproduction ==
=== Sexual ===
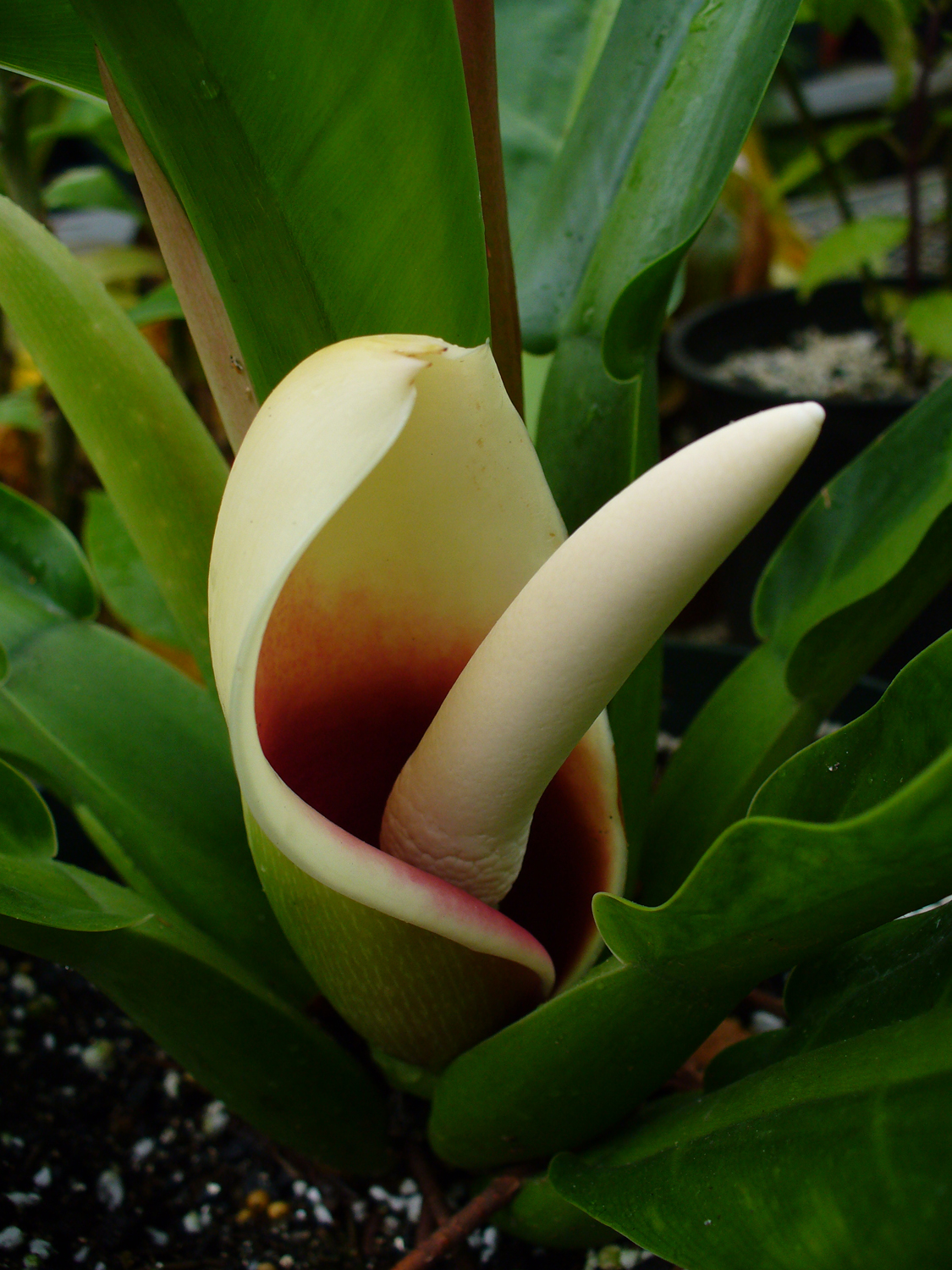
Inflorescence from Philodendron martianum

When philodendrons are ready to reproduce, they will produce an inflorescence which consists of a leaf-like hood called a spathe within which is enclosed a tube-like structure called a spadix. Depending on the species, a single inflorescence can be produced or a cluster of up to 11 inflorescences can be produced at a single time on short peduncles. The spathe tends to be waxy and is usually bicolored. In some philodendrons, the color of the base of the spathe contrasts in color with the upper part, and in others, the inner and outer surfaces of the spathe differ in coloration. The paler color tends to be either white or green, and the darker usually red or crimson. Pelargonidin is the predominant pigment causing the red coloration in the spathes. The upper portion of the spathe is called the limb or blade, while the lower portion is called the convolute tube or chamber due to its tubular structure at the base. The spadix is more often than not white and shorter than the spathe. On the spadix are found fertile female, fertile male, and sterile male flowers. The fertile male and female flowers are separated on the spadix by a sterile zone or staminodal region composed of sterile male flowers. This barrier of sterile male flowers ensures fertile male flowers do not fertilize the female flowers. The arrangement tends to be vertical, with fertile male flowers at the top of the spadix followed by sterile male flowers, and fertile female flowers very close to the bottom in the region known as the spathe tube or chamber. In some philodendrons, an additional region of sterile male flowers is found at the very top of the spadix. The fertile female flowers are often not receptive to fertilization when the fertile males are producing pollen, which again prevents self-pollination. The pollen itself is thread-like and appears to project out from the region where the fertile male flowers are located.

Sexual reproduction is achieved by means of beetles, with many philodendron species requiring the presence of a specific beetle species to achieve pollination. The reverse is not always the case, as many beetle species will pollinate more than one philodendron species. These same beetles could also pollinate other genera outside of philodendron, as well as outside of the family Araceae. The pollinating beetles are males and members of the subfamily Rutelinae and Dynastinae, and to date the only beetles seen to pollinate the inflorescence are in the genera Cyclocephala or Erioscelis. Other smaller types of beetles in the genus Neelia visit the inflorescences, as well, but they are not believed to be involved in pollinating philodendrons. To attract the beetles, the sterile male flowers give off pheromones to attract the male beetles, usually at dusk. This process, female anthesis, is followed by male anthesis, in which the pollen is produced. Female anthesis typically lasts up to two days and includes the gradual opening of the spathe to allow the beetles to enter. Some evidence suggests the timing of opening of the spathe is dependent on light levels, where cloudy, darker days result in the spathe opening up earlier than on clear days. During female anthesis, the spadix will project forward at roughly 45° relative to the spathe.

Once female anthesis is nearing its end and the female flowers have been pollinated, the spathe will be fully open and male anthesis begins. In the beginning of male anthesis, the fertile male flowers complete the process of producing the pollen and the female flowers become unreceptive to further pollination. Additionally, the spadix moves from its 45° position and presses up flush to the spathe. Towards the end of male anthesis, the spathe begins to close from the bottom, working its way up and forcing the beetles to move up and across the upper region of the spathe, where the fertile male flowers are located. In doing so, the philodendron controls when the beetles come and when they leave and forces them to rub against the top of the spadix where the pollen is located as they exit, thus ensuring they are well-coated with pollen. One would expect the beetles to stay indefinitely if they could due to the very favorable conditions the inflorescence provides. After male anthesis, the males will go off and find another philodendron undergoing female anthesis, so will pollinate the female flowers with the pollen it had collected from its previous night of mating.

=== Fruit ===
Botanically, the fruit produced is a berry. The berries develop later in the season; berry development time varies from species to species from a few weeks to a year, although most philodendrons take a few months. The spathe will enlarge to hold the maturing berries. Once the fruit are mature, the spathe will begin to open again, but this time it will break off at the base and fall to the forest floor. Additionally, the berries are edible, although they contain calcium oxalate crystals, and have a taste akin to bananas. Many botanical sources will indicate that the berries are poisonous, probably due to the oxalate crystals. Many tropical plants contain oxalates in varying amounts. Sometimes proper preparation can render these harmless, and in many cases eating minor amounts causes most people no distress or minor gastric irritation. However, care should be taken to verify the toxicity of any particular species before ingesting these berries, particularly regularly or in large amounts.

The color of the berries can vary depending on the species, but most produce a white berry with slight tones of green. Some produce orange berries and others yellow berries, though. Still others will produce berries that start off white, but then change to another color with time. Philodendrons that produce orange berries tend to be members of the section Calostigma. Contained within the berries are the seeds which are extremely small compared to other members of the family Araceae. The berries often give off odors to attract animals to eat and disperse them. For example, Philodendron alliodorum berries are known to emit an odor similar to that of garlic. The animals that distribute the seeds depends on the species, but some possible dispersers include bats and monkeys. Insects also may be responsible for dispersing seeds, as beetles and wasps have been seen feeding on philodendron berries.

Eurytomid wasps also seek out philodendrons and are known to lay their eggs in the ovaries of many Philodendron species, resulting in galled inflorescences.

=== Hybridization ===
Philodendrons exhibit extremely few physical reproductive barriers to prevent hybridization, but very few natural hybrids are found in nature. This may be because philodendrons have many geographic and time barriers to prevent any such cross pollination. For example, it is rare for more than one philodendron species to be flowering at the same time or to be pollinated by the same species of beetles. The beetles have also been observed to be selective to the height of the plant they pollinate, which would serve as an additional preventive measure to make hybrids less likely. Because of these outside barriers, philodendrons may not have had to evolve physical mechanisms to prevent cross-pollination. Hybrids in nature are only rarely reported. When found, these hybrids often can show remarkable genetic relationships. Crosses between two philodendrons in different sections can occur successfully.

== Taxonomy ==
=== History ===
Philodendrons are known to have been collected from the wild as early as 1644 by Georg Marcgraf, but the first partly successful scientific attempt to collect and classify the genus was done by Charles Plumier. Plumier collected approximately six species from the islands of Martinique, Hispaniola, and St. Thomas. Since then, many exploration attempts have been made to collect new species by others. These include those by N.J. Jacquin who collected new species in the West Indies, Colombia, and Venezuela. At this time in history, the names of the philodendrons they were discovering were being published with the genus name Arum, since most aroids were considered to belong to this same genus. The genus Philodendron had not yet been created. Throughout the late 17th, 18th century, and early 19th centuries, many plants were removed from the genus Arum and placed into newly created genera in an attempt to improve the classification. Heinrich Wilhelm Schott addressed the problem of providing improved taxonomy and created the genus Philodendron and described it in 1829. The genus was first spelled as 'Philodendrum', but in 1832, Schott published a system for classifying plants in the family Araceae titled Meletemata Botanica in which he provided a method of classifying philodendrons based on flowering characteristics. In 1856, Schott published a revision of his previous work titled Synopsis aroidearum, and then published his final work Prodromus Systematis Aroidearum in 1860, in which he provided even more details about the classification of Philodendron and described 135 species.

=== Modern classification ===
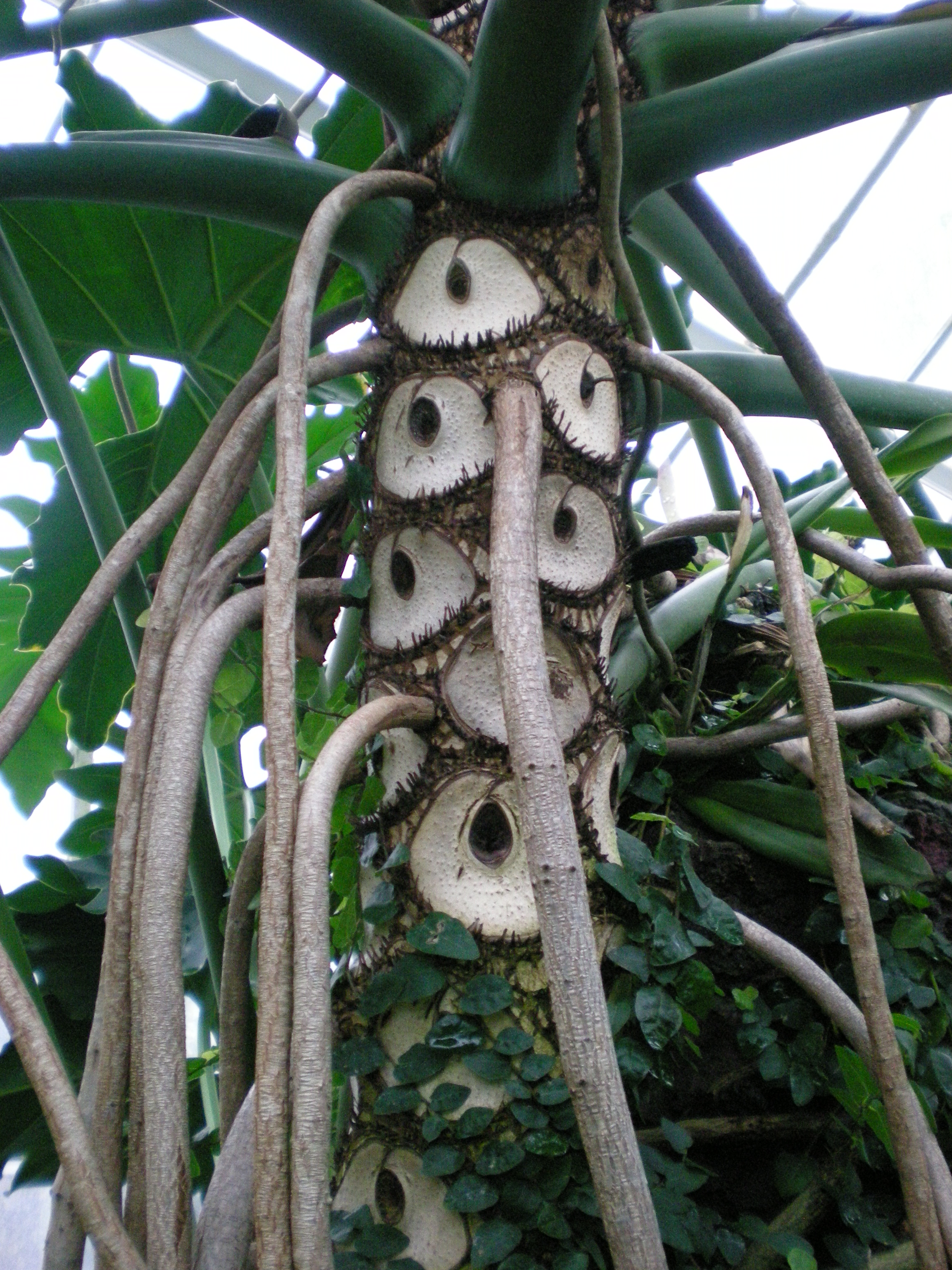
Philodendron bipinnatifidum, the stem showing typical leaf scars and adventitious roots

Philodendron are usually extremely distinctive and not usually confused with other genera, although a few exceptions in the genera Anthurium and Homalomena resemble Philodendron.

The genus Philodendron has been subdivided into three subgenera: Meconostigma, Pteromischum, and Philodendron. In 2018, it was proposed that Philodendron subg. Meconostigma be recognized as a separate genus, Thaumatophyllum.

The genus Philodendron can also be subdivided into several sections and subsections. Section Baursia, section Philopsammos, section Philodendron (subsections Achyropodium, Canniphyllium, Macrolonchium, Philodendron, Platypodium, Psoropodium and Solenosterigma), section Calostigma (subsections Bulaoana, Eucardium, Glossophyllum, Macrobelium and Oligocarpidium), section Tritomophyllum, section Schizophyllum, section Polytomium, section Macrogynium and section Camptogynium.

Typically, the inflorescence is of great importance in determining the species of a given philodendron, since it tends to be less variable than the leaves. The genus Philodendron could be classified further by means of differentiating them based on the pattern of thermogenesis observed, although this is not currently used.

=== Selected species ===
- Philodendron acutatum Schott
- Philodendron alliodorum Croat & Grayum
- Philodendron appendiculatum Nadruz & Mayo
- Philodendron auriculatum Standl. & L. O. Williams
- Philodendron balaoanum Engl.
- Philodendron bipennifolium Schott
- Philodendron carinatum E.G.Gonç.
- Philodendron chimboanum Engl.
- Philodendron consanguineum Schott - rascagarganta
- Philodendron cordatum (Vell.) Kunth
- Philodendron crassinervium Lindl.
- Philodendron cruentospathum Madison
- Philodendron davidsonii Croat
- Philodendron devansayeanum L. Linden
- Philodendron domesticum G. S. Bunting
- Philodendron duckei Croat & Grayum
- Philodendron ensifolium Croat & Grayum
- Philodendron erubescens K. Koch & Augustin
- Philodendron eximium Schott
- Philodendron fragrantissimum (Hook.) G. Don in Sweet
- Philodendron ferrugineum Croat
- Philodendron giganteum Schott - giant philodendron
- Philodendron gigas Croat
- Philodendron gloriosum André
- Philodendron gualeanum Engl.
- Philodendron hastatum K. Koch & Sello - silver philodendron, also known incorrectly as Philodendron glaucophyllum
- Philodendron hederaceum (Jacq.) Schott - vilevine, heartleaf philodendron, velvet-leaved philodendron
- Philodendron herbaceum Croat & Grayum
- Philodendron hooveri Croat & Grayum
- Philodendron imbe Schott ex Endl. - philodendron
- Philodendron jacquinii Schott
- Philodendron lacerum (Jacq.) Schott
- Philodendron lingulatum (L.) K. Koch - treelover
- Philodendron luanae Magno et al.
- Philodendron mamei André
- Philodendron marginatum Urban - Puerto Rico philodendron
- Philodendron martianum Engl. - also known incorrectly as Philodendron cannifolium
- Philodendron mayoi Symon Mayo
- Philodendron maximum K. Krause
- Philodendron melanochrysum Linden & André
- Philodendron microstictum Standl. & L. O. Williams
- Philodendron musifolium Engl.
- Philodendron nanegalense Engl.
- Philodendron neglectum Magno et al.
- Philodendron opacum Croat & Grayum
- Philodendron ornatum Schott
- Philodendron pachycaule K. Krause
- Philodendron panduriforme (Kunth) Kunth
- Philodendron pedatum (Hook.) Kunth
- Philodendron pinnatifidum (Jacq.) Schott
- Philodendron pogonocaule Madison
- Philodendron pterotum K.Koch & Augustin
- Philodendron quitense Engl.
- Philodendron radiatum Schott
- Philodendron recurvifolium Schott
- Philodendron renauxii Reitz
- Philodendron riparium Engl.
- Philodendron robustum Schott
- Philodendron rugosum Bogner & G.S.Bunting
- Philodendron sagittifolium Liebm.
- Philodendron santa leopoldina Liebm.
- Philodendron sphalerum Schott
- Philodendron squamiferum Poepp.
- Philodendron standleyi Grayum
- Philodendron tatei Krause
- Philodendron tripartitum (Jacq.) Schott
- Philodendron validinervium Engl.
- Philodendron ventricosum Madison
- Philodendron verrucosum L. Mathieu ex Schott
- Philodendron victoriae G.S. Bunting
- Philodendron warszewiczii K. Koch & C. D. Bouché
- Philodendron wendlandii Schott

== Evolution ==
Philodendron diverged from Adelonema and diversified during the late Oligocene, c. 25 million years ago, in the New World.

== Distribution and habitat ==
Philodendron species can be found in many diverse habitats in the tropical Americas and the West Indies. Most occur in humid tropical forests, but can also be found in swamps and on river banks, roadsides and rock outcrops. They are also found throughout the diverse range of elevations from sea level to over 2000 m above sea level. Species of this genus are often found clambering over other plants, or climbing the trunks of trees with the aid of aerial roots. Philodendrons usually distinguish themselves in their environment by their large numbers compared to other plants, making them a highly noticeable component of the ecosystems in which they are found. They are found in great numbers in road clearings.

Philodendrons can also be found in Australia, some Pacific islands, Africa and Asia, although they are not indigenous and were introduced or accidentally escaped.

== Ecology ==
The leaves of philodendrons are also known to be eaten by Venezuelan red howler monkeys, making up 3.1% of all the leaves they eat.

The resins produced during the flowering of Monstera and Philodendron are known to be used by Trigona stingless bees in the construction of their nests.

The spathe provides a safe breeding area for beetles. As such, male beetles are often followed there by female beetles. The philodendrons benefit from this symbiotic relationship because the males will eventually leave the spathe covered in pollen and repeat the process at another philodendron, pollinating it in the process. Females that see a male beetle headed for a philodendron flower know he does so with intention of mating, and females which are sexually receptive and need to mate know that they can find males if they follow the pheromones produced by the philodendron flowers. As a result, the male beetles benefit from this relationship with the philodendrons because they do not have to produce pheromones to attract females. Additionally, male beetles benefit because they are ensured of mating with only sexually receptive females. Pheromones produced by the philodendrons may be similar to those produced by female beetles when they wish to attract males to mate. Also, the pheromones have a sweet, fruity smell in many species and no noticeable smell for others. Additionally, the beetles consume pollen from the fertile male flowers throughout the night, in addition to the sterile male flowers which are rich in lipids.

Typically, five to 12 beetles will be within the spathe throughout the night. Rarely, cases of 200 beetles at a time have been observed and almost always the beetles are of the same species. Another feature of this symbiotic relationship, less well understood, is the series of events in which the spadix begins to heat up prior to the spathe opening up for the beetles. This process is known as thermogenesis. By the time the spathe is open and the beetles have arrived, the spadix is usually quite hot; up to around 46 °C in some species, but usually around 35 °C. The thermogenesis coincides with the arrival of the beetles and appears to increase their presence. The maximum temperature reached by the spadix remains about 20 °C higher than the outside ambient temperature. The time dependence of the temperature can vary from species to species. In some species, the temperature of the spadix will peak on the arrival of the beetles, then decrease, and finally increase reaching a maximum once again when the philodendron is ready for the beetles to leave. Other species, though, only show a maximum temperature on the arrival of the beetles, which remains roughly constant for about a day, and then steadily decreases.

As the beetles home in on the inflorescence, they first move in a zig-zag pattern until they get reasonably close, when they switch to a straight-line path. The beetles may use scent to find the inflorescence when they are far away, but once within range, they find it by means of the infrared radiation, accounting for the two types of paths the beetles follow.

== Cultivation ==
=== Growing ===
Philodendrons can be grown outdoors in mild climates in shady spots. They thrive in moist soils with high organic matter. In milder climates, they can be grown in pots of soil or in the case of Philodendron oxycardium in containers of water. Indoor plants thrive at temperatures between 15 and 18 °C and can survive at lower light levels than other house plants. Although philodendrons can survive in dark places, they much prefer bright lights. Wiping the leaves off with water will remove any dust and insects. Plants in pots with good root systems will benefit from a weak fertilizer solution every other week.

=== Propagation ===
New plants can be grown by taking stem cuttings with at least two joints. Cuttings then can be rooted in pots of sand and peat moss mixtures. These pots are placed in greenhouses with bottom heat of 21–24 °C. During the rooting, cuttings should be kept out of direct sunlight. Once rooted, the plants can be transplanted to larger pots or directly outside in milder climates. Stem cuttings, particularly from trailing varieties, can be rooted in water. In four to five weeks, the plant should develop roots and can be transferred to pots. Philodendrons can also propagate through air layering which is a more advanced method of propagation that involves creating a new plant on the stem of an existing plant.

Hybridizing philodendrons is quite easy if flowering plants are available, because they have very few barriers to prevent hybridization. However, some aspects of making crosses can make philodendron hybridization more difficult. Philodendrons often flower at different times and the time when the spathe opens up varies from plant to plant. The pollen and the inflorescence both have short lives, which means a large collection of philodendrons is necessary if crossbreeding is to be done successfully. The pollen life can be extended to a few weeks by storing it in film canisters in a refrigerator. Artificial pollination is usually achieved by first mixing the pollen with water. A window is then cut into the spathe and the water-pollen mixture is rubbed on the fertile female flowers. The entire spathe is then covered in a plastic bag so the water–pollen mixture does not dry out; the bag is removed a few days later. If the inflorescence has not been fertilized, it will fall off, usually within a few weeks.

== Toxicity ==
Philodendrons can contain as much as 0.7% of oxalates in the form of calcium oxalate crystals as raphides. The risk of death, if even possible, is extremely low if ingested by an average adult, although its consumption is generally considered unhealthy. In general, the calcium oxalate crystals have a very mild effect on humans, and large quantities have to be consumed for symptoms to even appear. Possible symptoms include increased salivation, a sensation of burning of the mouth, swelling of the tongue, stomatitis, dysphagia, an inability to speak, and edema. Cases of mild dermatitis due to contact with the leaves have also been reported, with symptoms including vesiculation and erythema. The chemical derivatives of alkenyl resorcinol are believed to be responsible for the dermatitis in some people. Contact with philodendron oils or fluids with the eyes have also been known to result in conjunctivitis. Fatal poisonings are extremely rare; one case of an infant eating small quantities of a philodendron resulting in hospitalization and death has been reported. This one case study, however, was found to be inconsistent with the findings from a second study. In this study, 127 cases of children ingesting philodendrons were studied, and they found only one child showed symptoms; a 10-month-old had minor upper lip swelling when he chewed on a philodendron leaf. The study also found the symptoms could subside without treatment and that previously reported cases of severe complications were exaggerated.

In a 1961 study, 72 cases of cat poisonings were examined, of which 37 resulted in the death of the cat. The symptoms of the poisoned cats included excitability, spasms, seizures, kidney failure, and encephalitis. In a 1978 study, three cats (two adults and one kitten) were tube-fed a puréed leaf and water mixture of P. cordatum, then euthanized. A necropsy showed no signs or symptoms of acute poisoning or toxicity. Dosages of 2.8, 5.6, and 9.1 g/kg were used, the highest dose being much more than a house cat could consume. Earlier epidemiological studies (which did not necessarily invoke a purée-and-water feeding method) were suggested to be wrong based on the premise that many of the sick cats in those studies may have had pre-existing conditions and merely consumed philodendrons in an attempt to alleviate their illnesses.

Some philodendrons are known to be toxic to mice and rats. In one study, 100 mg of P. cordatum leaves suspended in distilled water were fed to six mice. Three of the mice died. The same experiment was done with 100 mg of P. cordatum stems on three mice and none of them died. Leaves and flowers of P. sagittifolium were also orally administered in 100-mg doses to the mice. Three mice were used for each of the leaves and flowers; none of the mice died. A similar experiment was done on rats with the leaves and stems of P. cordatum, but instead of oral administration of the dose, it was injected intraperitoneally using 3 g of plant extract from either the leaves or stems. Six rats were injected with the leaf extract and five of them died. Eight rats were injected with the stem extract and two of them died.

== Uses ==
Indigenous people from South America use the resin from bees' nests (made from the species) to make their blowguns air- and watertight.

Though they contain calcium oxalate crystals, the berries of some species are eaten by the locals. For example, the sweet white berries of Philodendron bipinnatifidum are known to be used. Additionally, the aerial roots are also used for rope in this particular species.

Also, in the making of a particular recipe for curare by the Amazonian Taiwanos, the leaves and stems of an unknown philodendron species are used. The leaves and stems are mixed with the bark of Vochysia ferruginea and with some parts of a species in the genus Strychnos.

Yet another use of philodendrons is for catching fish. A tribe in the Colombian Amazon is known to use P. craspedodromum to poison to the water, temporarily stunning the fish, which rise up to the surface, where they can be easily scooped up. To add the poison to the water, the leaves are cut into pieces and tied together to form bundles, which are allowed to ferment for a few days. The bundles are crushed and added to the water into which the poison will dissipate. Although the toxicity of P. craspedodromum is not fully known, active ingredients in the poisoning of the fish possibly are coumarins formed during the fermentation process.

Some philodendrons are also used for ceremonial purposes. Among the Kubeo tribe, native to Colombia, P. insigne is used by witch doctors to assuage ill patients. They use the juice of the spathe to stain their hands red, since many such tribes view the color red as a sign of power.
