= Raphide =

Plant chemical defense

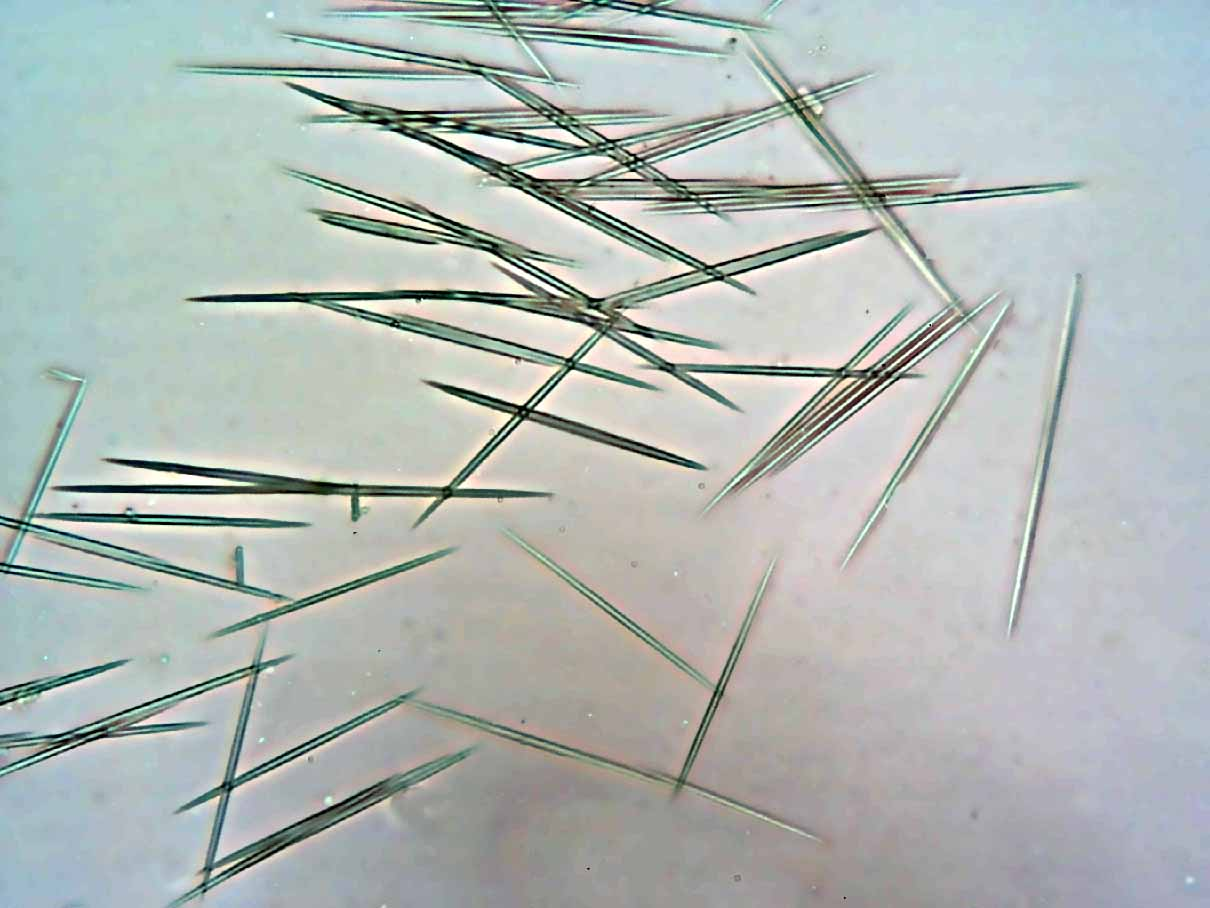
Raphides in Epipremnum Devil's ivy (600× magnification)

Raphides (/ˈræfɪdiz/ RAF-id-eez; singular raphide /ˈreɪfaɪd/ RAY-fyde or raphis) are needle-shaped crystals of calcium oxalate monohydrate (prismatic monoclinic crystals) or calcium carbonate as aragonite (dipyramidal orthorhombic crystals), found in more than 200 families of plants. Both ends appear needle-like, but raphides tend to be blunt at one end and sharp at the other.

== Calcium oxalate in plants ==
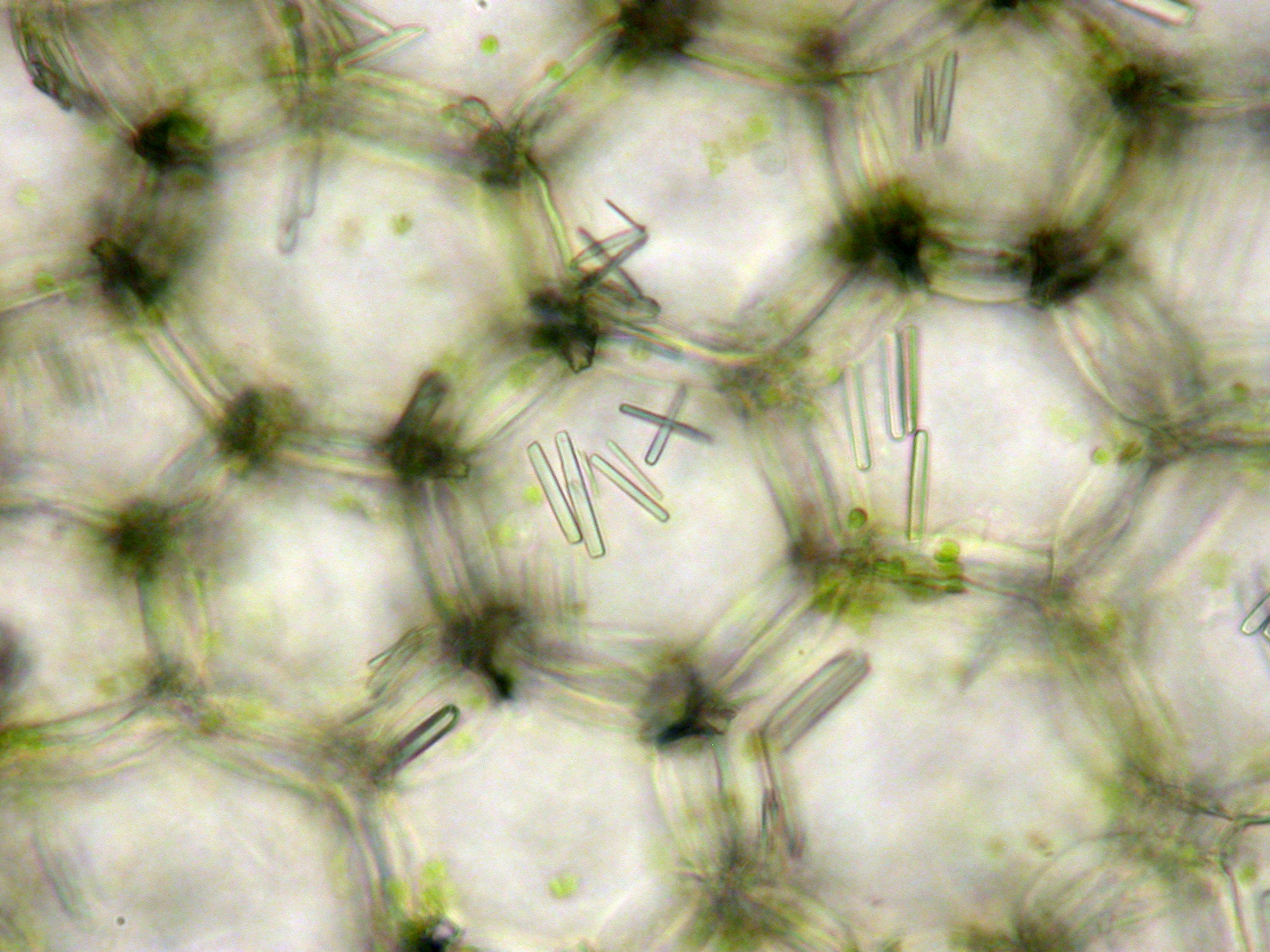
Raphides in Hypoestes phyllostachya, the polka dot plant

Many plants accumulate calcium oxalate crystals in response to surplus calcium, which is found throughout the natural environment. The crystals are produced in a variety of shapes. The crystal morphology depends on the taxonomic group of the plant. In one study of over 100 species, it was found that calcium oxalate accounted for 6.3% of plant dry weight. Crystal morphology and the distribution of raphides (in roots or leaves or tubers etc.) is similar in some taxa but different in others leaving possible opportunities for plant key characteristics and systematic identification; mucilage in raphide containing cells makes light microscopy difficult, though. Little is known about the mechanisms of sequestration or indeed the reason for the accumulation of raphides but it is most likely as a defense mechanism against herbivory. It has also been suggested that in some cases raphides may help form plant skeletal structures. Raphides typically occur in parenchyma cells in aerial organs, especially the leaves, and are generally confined to the mesophyll. As the leaf area increases, so does the number of raphides, the process starting in even young leaves. The first indication that the cell will contain crystals is shown when the cells enlarge with a larger nucleus.

Raphides are found in specialized plant cells or crystal chambers called idioblasts. Electron micrographs have shown that raphide needle crystals are normally four sided or H-shaped (with a groove down both sides) or with a hexagonal cross section and some are barbed. Wattendorf (1976) suggested that all circular sectioned raphides, as visible in a light microscope, are probably hexagonal in cross section The hexagonal crystals reported by Wattendorf in Agave americana were apparently calcium oxalate.

Microscopy using polarized light shows bright opalescence with raphides.

Plants like Tradescantia pallida also accumulate calcium oxalate crystals in response to heavy metals stress.

== Harmful effects ==
Raphides can produce severe toxic reactions by facilitating the passage of toxin through the herbivore's skin when the tissue containing the raphides also contains toxins. The lethal dose to mice is around 15 mg/kg. Raphides seem to be a defense mechanism against plant consuming animals, as they are likely to tear and harm the soft tissues of the throat or esophagus of an animal chewing on the plant's leaves. The venomous process is in two stages: mechanical pricking and injection of harmful protease. Typically ingestion of plants containing raphides, like those common in certain houseplants, can cause immediate numbing followed shortly by painful edema, vesicle formation and dysphagia accompanied by painful stinging and burning to the mouth and throat with symptoms occurring for up to two weeks. Airway assessment and management are of the highest priority, as are extensive irrigation and analgesics in eye exposure.

Raphides cannot normally be destroyed by boiling; that requires an acidic environment or chemical solvents like ether. Plants containing large amounts of raphides are generally acrid and unpalatable. However, it is not always possible to detect the presence of raphides through taste alone. In some tubers such as the Indian turnip which contain large quantities of raphides, the roots are not unpalatable when cooked because the raphides are bound within a matrix of starch which prevents the tongue from sensing their presence. Some other plants store raphides in mucilaginous environments and also do not taste acrid.

There is some doubt about the role of raphides in defense against herbivory. Insects are only rarely affected by them, and no more than by sand. Ruminants are not harmed by them, because certain bacteria in their rumen help to degrade oxalate.

== Plants containing raphides ==
Common names vary. The following list is incomplete. Raphides are found in many species in the families Araceae and Commelinaceae, but are also found in a few species in a number of other families.

Acanthaceae:

- Strobilanthes barbata (stem, leaf)
- Strobilanthes callosa (stem, leaf)
- Strobilanthes ciliata (stem, leaf)
- Strobilanthes heyneana (leaf)
- Strobilanthes integrifolia (stem, leaf)
- Strobilanthes lupulina (stem, leaf)
- Strobilanthes reticulata (stem, leaf)
- Strobilanthes sessilis (stem, leaf)
- Thunbergia erecta (stem, leaf)
- Thunbergia laurifolia (stem, leaf)

Actinidiaceae:

- Actinidia arguta (root, flower, fruit)
- Actinidia callosa (fruit)
- Actinidia chinensis (root, flower, fruit)
- Actinidia chrysantha (root, fruit)
- Actinidia deliiosa (fruit)
- Actinidia eriantha (fruit)
- Actinidia fulvicoma (fruit)
- Actinidia glaucophylla (fruit)
- Actinidia hemsleyana (root)
- Actinidia indochinensis (fruit)
- Actinidia lanceolata (fruit)
- Actinidia macrosperma (fruit)
- Actinidia polygama (fruit)
- Actinidia rufa (root, fruit)
- Clematoclethra scandens (flower)
- Saurauia pittieri (flower)
- Saurauia subspinosa (flower)

Alstroemeriaceae:

- Alstroemeria angustifolia (leaf)
- Alstroemeria aurea (leaf)
- Alstroemeria exserens (leaf)
- Alstroemeria hookeri (leaf)
- Alstroemeria ligtu (leaf)
- Alstroemeria magnifica (leaf)
- Alstroemeria pallida (leaf)
- Alstroemeria pelegrina (leaf)
- Alstroemeria presliana (leaf)
- Alstroemeria pulchra (leaf)
- Alstroemeria versicolor (leaf)
- Bomarea multiflora (leaf)
- Bomarea ovallei (leaf)

Amaranthaceae:

- Beta
- Spinacia

Amaryllidaceae:

- Crinum amabile (leaf)
- Leucojum aestivum (leaf)
- Pancratium sickenbergeri (leaf)

Araceae:

- Alocasia macrorrhizos (root, stem, leaf, flower)
- Amorphophallus bulbifer (leaf)
- Amorphophallus blumei (root, leaf)
- Amorphophallus dunnii (leaf)
- Amorphophallus gallaensis (leaf)
- Amorphophallus konjac (leaf)
- Amorphophallus krausei (leaf)
- Amorphophallus muelleri (root, leaf)
- Amorphophallus paeoniifolius (root, leaf)
- Amorphophallus salmoneus (leaf)
- Amorphophallus sutepensis (leaf)
- Amorphophallus taurostigma (leaf)
- Amorphophallus titanum (leaf)
- Amorphophallus variabilis (leaf)
- Anaphyllopsis americana (flower)
- Anthurium andraeanum (leaf, flower)
- Anthurium acaule (flower)
- Anthurium crystallinum (flower)
- Anthurium cubense (flower)
- Anthurium halmoorei (flower)
- Anthurium harrisii (flower)
- Anthurium jenmannii (flower)
- Anthurium magnificum (flower)
- Anthurium maricense (leaf)
- Anthurium pallidiflorum (flower)
- Anthurium pedatoradiatum (flower)
- Anthurium schlechtendalii (flower)
- Anthurium signatum (flower)
- Anthurium spectabile (flower)
- Anubias heterophylla (flower)
- Arisaema
- Arisarum vulgare (flower)
- Arum pictum (flower)
- Caladium
- Calla palustris (flower)
- Cercestis dinklagei (flower)
- Colocasia affinis (stem)
- Colocasia gigantea (stem)
- Colocasia esculenta (root, stem, leaf)
- Cyrtosperma chamissonis (stem)
- Cyrtosperma johnstonii (root, leaf, flower)
- Cyrtosperma merkusii (stem, leaf)
- Dieffenbachia seguine (stem, leaf, flower)
- Epipremnum
- Lemna minor (leaf)
- Monstera deliciosa (fruit)
- Philodendron adamantinum (syn. Thaumatophyllum adamantinum (flower)
- Philodendron bipinnatifidum (flower)
- Philodendron brasiliense (syn. Thaumatophyllum brasiliense (flower)
- Philodendron corcovadense (syn. Thaumatophyllum corcovadense (flower)
- Philodendron dardanianum (syn. Thaumatophyllum dardanianum (flower)
- Philodendron lundii (syn. Thaumatophyllum lundii (flower)
- Philodendron megalophyllum (flower)
- Philodendron moonenii (flower)
- Philodendron oblongum (flower)
- Philodendron paludicola (syn. Thaumatophyllum paludicola (flower)
- Philodendron pedatum (flower)
- Philodendron petraeum (syn. Thaumatophyllum petraeum (flower)
- Philodendron propinquum (flower)
- Philodendron saxicola (syn. Thaumatophyllum saxicola (flower)
- Philodendron speciosum (syn. Thaumatophyllum speciosum (flower)
- Philodendron tweedieanum (syn. Thaumatophyllum tweedieanum (flower)
- Philodendron uliginosum (syn. Thaumatophyllum uliginosum (flower)
- Philodendron undulatum (syn. Thaumatophyllum undulatum (flower)
- Philodendron williamsii (syn. Thaumatophyllum williamsii (flower)
- Pinellia ternata (stem)
- Pinellia pedatisecta (stem)
- Pistia stratiotes (leaf)
- Spathiphyllum
- Stenospermation longiopetiolatum (flower)
- Syngonium schottianum (flower)
- Typhonium flagelliforme (stem)
- Xanthosoma sagittifolium (root, stem, leaf)
- Zantedeschia aethiopia (flower)

Araliaceae:

- Brassaia

Arecaceae:

- Acrocomia aculeata (root, leaf, flower)
- Acrocomia crispa (root, leaf, flower)
- Acrocomia emensis (root, leaf, flower)
- Acrocomia glaucensis (root, leaf, flower)
- Acrocomia hassleri (root, leaf, flower)
- Acrocomia intumescens (root, leaf, flower)
- Acrocomia totai (root, leaf, flower)
- Allagoptera campestris (leaf)
- Ammandra decasperma (pseudopedicel)
- Aphandra natalia (pseudopedicel)
- Archontophoenix alexandrae (embryo)
- Areca catechu (embryo)
- Areca macrocalyx (embryo)
- Areca novohibernica (embryo)
- Arenga tremula (embryo)
- Bactris gasipaes (fruit)
- Brassiophoenix dryomphloeides (embryo)
- Butia buenopolensis (leaf, flower)
- Butia campicola (leaf)
- Butia capitata (leaf)
- Butia catarinensis (leaf)
- Butia exospadix (leaf)
- Butia leptospatha (leaf)
- Butia marmorii (leaf)
- Butia microspadix (leaf)
- Butia pubispatha (leaf)
- Calyptrocalyx albertisianus (fruit)
- Calyptrocalyx hollrungii (embryo)
- Calyptrocalyx lepidotus (fruit)
- Calyptrocalyx spicatus (embryo)
- Caryota cumingii (embryo)
- Caryota mitis (root, stem, leaf, flower, fruit)
- Caryota rumphiana (stem, leaf)
- Chamaedorea tepejilote (embryo)
- Cocos nucifera (root, stem, leaf)
- Copernicia tectorum (flower, fruit)
- Cyrtostachys renda (embryo)
- Drymophloeus pachycladus (embryo)
- Drymophloeus subdistichus (embryo)
- Dypsis decaryi (embryo)
- Dypsis leptocheilos (embryo)
- Dypsis lutescens (embryo)
- Euterpe oleracea (embryo)
- Howea fosteriana (fruit)
- Hydriastele rostrata (embryo)
- Hyophorbe verschaffeltii
- Iguanura sp. (embryo)
- Laccospadix australasicus (fruit)
- Linospadix microcaryus (fruit)
- Linospadix monostachyos (fruit)
- Livistonia saribus (embryo)
- Normanbya normanbyi (embryo)
- Oenocarpus bacaba (embryo)
- Oenocarpus bataua (embryo)
- Oncosperma horridum (embryo)
- Oncosperma tigillarium (embryo)
- Pelagodoxa henryana (fruit)
- Pinanga coronata (embryo)
- Pinanga negrosensis (embryo)
- Pinanga malaiana (embryo)
- Pinanga scortechinii (embryo)
- Prestoea acuminata (embryo)
- Ptychosperma caryotoides (embryo)
- Rhapis excelsa (embryo)
- Solfia samoensis (embryo)

Aspleniaceae:

- Asplenium cardiophyllum (leaf epidermis)

Asparagaceae:

- Agave debilis (root, leaf)
- Agave geminiflora (flower)
- Agave gracillima (root, leaf)
- Agave guerrerensis (root, stem, leaf)
- Agave guttata (root, leaf)
- Agave hauniensis (root, leaf)
- Agave howardii (flower)
- Agave longiflora (root, stem, leaf)
- Agave multicolor (flower)
- Agave nanchititlensis (root, leaf)
- Agave neonelsonii (flower)
- Agave parrasana (leaf)
- Agave platyphylla (flower)
- Agave polycantha (flower)
- Agave potosina (root, stem, leaf)
- Agave pratensis (root, leaf)
- Agave scabra (root, leaf)
- Agave singuliflora (root, leaf)
- Agave stictata (root, leaf)
- Agave tequilana (root, leaf)
- Agave victoriae-reginae (leaf)
- Bellevalia paradoxa (leaf)
- Chlorophytum orchidastrum
- Cordyline terminalis (root, stem, leaf)
- Dracaena sanderiana (leaf)
- Hyacinthella nervosa (leaf)
- Hyacinthella hispida (leaf)
- Hyacinthella siirtensis (leaf)
- Hyacinthella venusta (leaf)
- Ornithogalum alpiganum (stem, leaf)
- Ornithogalum caudatum (flower)
- Polygonatum odoratum (leaf)
- Polygonatum prattii (leaf)
- Triteleia crocea (ovary)
- Triteleia dudleyi (ovary)
- Triteleia hendersonii (ovary)
- Triteleia hyacintha (ovary)
- Triteleia ixioides (ovary)
- Triteleia laxa (ovary)
- Yucca treculiana (root)

Asphodelaceae:

- Aloe harlana (leaf)
- Aloe nobilis (leaf)
- Asphodelus aestivus (root)
- Gasteria obliqua (leaf)
- Haworthia cymbiformis (leaf)

Asteraceae:

- Aster warmingii (root)
- Baccharis glaziovii (stem)
- Silybum marianum (stem)
- Solidago chilensis (stem)

Balsaminaceae:

- Impatiens arguta (stem)
- Impatiens balfourii (stem, leaf, flower)
- Impatiens niamniamensis (stem)
- Impatiens parviflora (flower)
- Impatiens thomsonii (stem, leaf, flower)

Boraginaceae:

- Onosma mollis (leaf)
- Onosma sorgeri (leaf)

Bromeliaceae:

- very widespread

Cactaceae:

- widespread

Colchicaceae:

- Colchicum kurdi (root)

Commelinaceae:

- Cochliostema odoratissimum (stem, leaf, flower)
- Commelina coelestis (pollen)
- Commelina tuberosa (pollen)
- Dichorisandra thyrsiflora (anther)
- Tinantia anomala (root, leaf, flower)
- Tinantia pringlei (root, leaf, flower)
- Tradescantia ohiensis (stem)
- Tradescantia pallida (anther)
- Tradescantia spathacea (anther)
- Triceratella

Cucurbitaceae:

- Momordica dioica (stem)
- Momordica cochinchinensis (stem)

Dioscoreaceae:

- Dioscorea bulbifera (root, bulbil)
- Dioscorea esculenta (root)
- Dioscorea hispida (root, petiole)
- Dioscorea japonica (root)
- Dioscorea polystachya (root, stem)

Ebenaceae:

- Diospyros montana (bark, fruit)

Euphorbiaceae:

- Ricinus communis (leaf)

Fabaceae:

- Acacia robeorum (stem, leaf)
- Medicago truncatula (leaf)
- Pachyrhizus tuberosus (root)

Haemodoraceae:

- Anigozanthos flavidus (leaf, flower)
- Conostylis candicans (flower)

Heliconiaceae:

- Heliconia indica (root, flower, fruit)
- Heliconia longiflora (leaf)

Hydrangeaceae:

- Hydrangea macrophylla (leaf)

Lamiaceae:

- Satureja khuzestanica (leaf)

Liliaceae:

- Drimia maritima (leaf, flower bud)

Lowiaceae:

- Orchidantha maxillarioides (stem, leaf)

Marcgraviaceae:

- very widespread

Musaceae:

- Musa acuminata (leaf, fruit)
- Musa ingens (leaf, flower)
- Musa maclayi (leaf, flower, fruit)

Nyctaginaceae:

- Bougainvillea glabra (leaf)
- Bougainvillea spectabilis (leaf)

Oleaceae:

- very widespread

Onagraceae:

- Epilobium tibetanum (leaf)
- Ludwigia peploides (leaf)

Orchidaceae:

- very widespread

Pandanaceae:

- Pandanus dubius (wood)
- Pandanus leram (leaf)
- Pandanus tectorius (wood)

Passifloraceae:

- Passiflora cincinnata (fruit)

Philydraceae:

- Heimholtzia glaberrima

Piperaceae:

- Manekia incurva (leaf)
- Manekia sydowii (leaf)
- Peperomia fagerlindii (leaf)
- Peperomia incana (leaf)
- Peperomia longespicata (leaf)
- Peperomia macrostachya (leaf)
- Peperomia serpens (leaf)
- Peperomia vinasiana (leaf)
- Piper augustum (leaf)
- Piper betle (leaf)
- Piper caldense (leaf, stem)
- Piper cavendishioides (leaf)
- Piper chrysostachyum (leaf)
- Piper cinereum (leaf)
- Piper confusum (leaf)
- Piper dotanum (leaf)
- Piper eriopodon (leaf)
- Piper filistium (leaf)
- Piper glabrescens (leaf)
- Piper hispidum (leaf)
- Piper lapathifolium (leaf)
- Piper leucophyllum (leaf)
- Piper mikanianum (leaf)
- Piper munchanum (leaf)
- Piper corrugatum (leaf)
- Piper peltatum (leaf)
- Piper pseudovariabile (leaf)
- Piper sancti-felicis (leaf)
- Piper umbellatum (leaf)
- Piper urdanetanum (leaf)
- Piper oxystachyum (leaf)
- Zippelia begoniifolia (leaf)

Poaceae:

- Cenchrus echinatus

Polygonaceae:

- Rheum rhabarbarum

Pontederiaceae:

- Monochoria africana (anther)
- Pontederia cordata (root)
- Pontederia crassipes (stem)

Roridulaceae:

- Roridula gorgonias (flower)

Rosaceae:

- Rubus alutaceus (leaf)

Rubiaceae:

- very widespread

Tetrameristaceae:

- Pelliciera rhizophorae (stem, flower)
- Pentamerista neotropica (flower)
- Tetramerista glabra (stem)

Typhaceae:

- Typha angustifolia (leaf)
- Typha latifolia (leaf)

Vitaceae:

- Cissus alata (leaf)
- Cissus discolor (leaf)
- Cissus quadrangularis (leaf)
- Cissus repanda (leaf)
- Cissus rotundifolia (leaf)
- Parthenocissus quinquefolia (leaf)
- Parthenocissus tricuspidata (leaf)
- Parthenocissus vitacea (leaf)
- Rhoicissus tomentosa (leaf)
- Tetrastigma voinierianum (leaf)
- Vitis berlandieri (root)
- Vitis rupestris (anther)
- Vitis vinifera (leaf)

== See also ==
- Calcium oxalate
- Druse
- Phytolith
- Plant defense against herbivory

== Bibliography ==
- Lawrie, Natasha S.; Medrano Cuetos, Nekane; Sini, Francesca; Salam, Ghifary A.; Ding, Hangyu; Vancolen, Arthur; Nelson, Jessica M.; Erkens, Roy H. J.; Perversi, Giuditta (6 June 2023). "Systematic review on raphide morphotype calcium oxalate crystals in angiosperms". AoB Plants. 15 (4) plad031. doi:10.1093/aobpla/plad031. eISSN 2041-2851. PMC 10406436. PMID 37554287. See Supporting Information.
- Sousa Paiva, Élder Antônio (27 May 2021). "Do calcium oxalate crystals protect against herbivory?". Concepts & Synthesis. 108 (3) 24. Bibcode:2021SciNa.108...24P. doi:10.1007/s00114-021-01735-z. eISSN 1947-9468. PMID 34043088.
- Keating, Richard C. (2004). "Systematic Occurrence of Raphide Crystals in Araceae". Annals of the Missouri Botanical Garden. 91 (3): 495–504. JSTOR 3298626.
