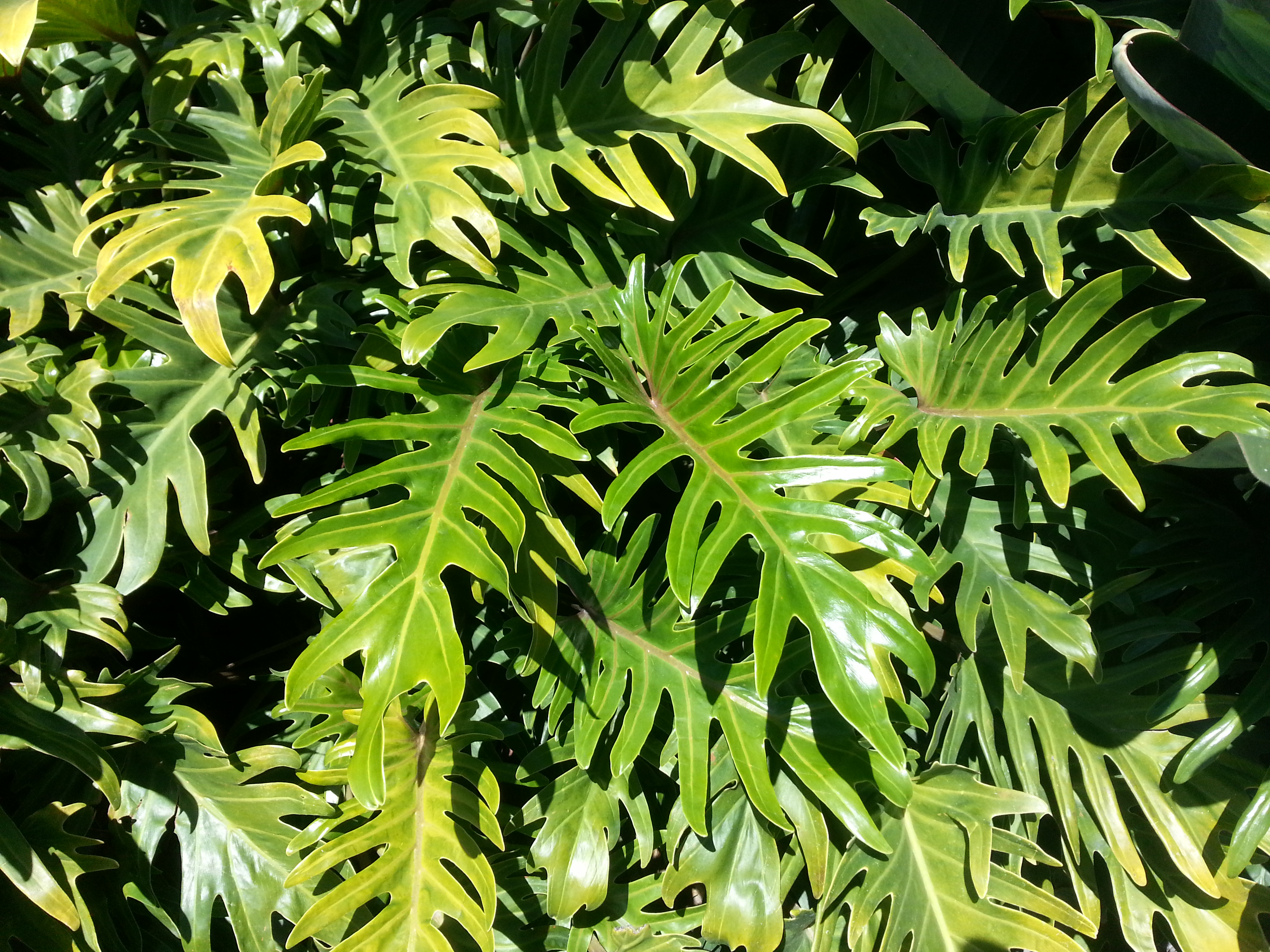
- Thaumatophyllum xanadu

Scientific classification
- Kingdom: Plantae
- Clade: Tracheophytes
- Clade: Angiosperms
- Clade: Monocots
- Order: Alismatales
- Family: Araceae
- Subfamily: Aroideae
- Tribe: Philodendreae
- Genus: Thaumatophyllum; Schott

Species
- See text

Synonyms
- Philodendron subg. Meconostigma

= Thaumatophyllum =

Genus of flowering plants

Thaumatophyllum is a sometimes recognized genus of flowering plants in the arum family, Araceae corresponding to Philodendron subg. Meconostigma. Its species are native to northern (tropical) South America.

== Taxonomy ==
The genus Thaumatophyllum was erected by Heinrich Wilhelm Schott in 1859, with the sole species Thaumatophyllum spruceanum. In 1962, G.M. Barroso transferred T. spruceanum to Philodendron, though the transfer was not made correctly and Barroso's name Philodendron spruceanum is illegitimate. While in Philodendron, T. spruceanum was placed, along with other species, in subgenus Meconostigma. A series of molecular phylogenetic studies, particularly from 2008 onwards, suggested that, when broadly circumscribed, Philodendron was not monophyletic. In 2018, it was proposed that subgenus Meconostigma should be raised to the rank of genus, under the name Thaumatophyllum. As of October 2025, the proposal was not accepted by Plants of the World Online, among other taxonomic databases.

The generic epithet Thaumatophyllum comes from Ancient Greek θαυμα (thaûma, "miracle") + φύλλον (phúllon, "leaf").

=== Phylogeny ===
Relationships among the subtaxa of Philodendron and related genera are not yet fully resolved. Several studies up to 2018 that have produced a resolved tree suggest that relationships may be of the form:

- - Homalomena + Furtadoa
  - - Adelonema
    - - Philodendron subg. Meconostigma = Thaumatophyllum
      - - Philodendron subg. Pteromischum
        - Philodendron subg. Philodendron

== Selected species ==
Species that have been placed in Thaumatophyllum include:

- Thaumatophyllum adamantinum (Mart. ex Schott) Sakur., Calazans & Mayo = Philodendron adamantinum
- Thaumatophyllum bipinnatifidum (Schott ex Endl.) Sakur., Calazans & Mayo = Philodendron bipinnatifidum
- Thaumatophyllum saxicola (K.Krause) Sakur., Calazans & Mayo = Philodendron saxicola
- Thaumatophyllum speciosum (Schott ex Endl.) Sakur., Calazans & Mayo = Philodendron speciosum
- Thaumatophyllum spruceanum Schott = Philodendron goeldii
- Thaumatophyllum stenolobum (E.G.Gonç.) Sakur., Calazans & Mayo = Philodendron stenolobum
- Thaumatophyllum xanadu (Croat, J.Boos & Mayo) Sakur., Calazans & Mayo = Philodendron xanadu
