= Coccochondra =

Scientific classification
- Kingdom: Plantae
- Clade: Tracheophytes
- Clade: Angiosperms
- Clade: Eudicots
- Clade: Asterids
- Order: Gentianales
- Family: Rubiaceae
- Genus: Coccochondra; Rauschert

Type species
- Coccochondra laevis (Steyerm.) Rauschert

Genus of plants

Coccochondra is a genus of flowering plants in the family Rubiaceae. There are four species native to the Guayana Highlands of northern South America.

These plants are low shrubs with tough leaves, small inflorescences of funnel-shaped flowers, and raphides in their tissues.

== Species ==
- Coccochondra carrenoi (Steyerm.) C.M.Taylor
- Coccochondra durifolia (Standl.) C.M.Taylor
- Coccochondra laevis (Steyerm.) Rauschert
  - Coccochondra laevis subsp. laevis
  - Coccochondra laevis subsp. maigualidae J.H.Kirkbr.
- Coccochondra phelpsiana (Steyerm.) C.M.Taylor
