= Philodendron angustilobum =

Scientific classification
- Kingdom: Plantae
- Clade: Tracheophytes
- Clade: Angiosperms
- Clade: Monocots
- Order: Alismatales
- Family: Araceae
- Genus: Philodendron
- Species: P. angustilobum

Binomial name
- Philodendron angustilobum Croat & Grayum

Species of plant

Philodendron angustilobum, the narrow-leaved philodendron (a name it shares with Philodendron oblongum), is a species of flowering plant in the family Araceae. It is found in wet tropical parts of southern Central America and southwestern Colombia. A climbing shrub or tree, it is noted in cultivation for its well-behaved growth habit and ease of care.
