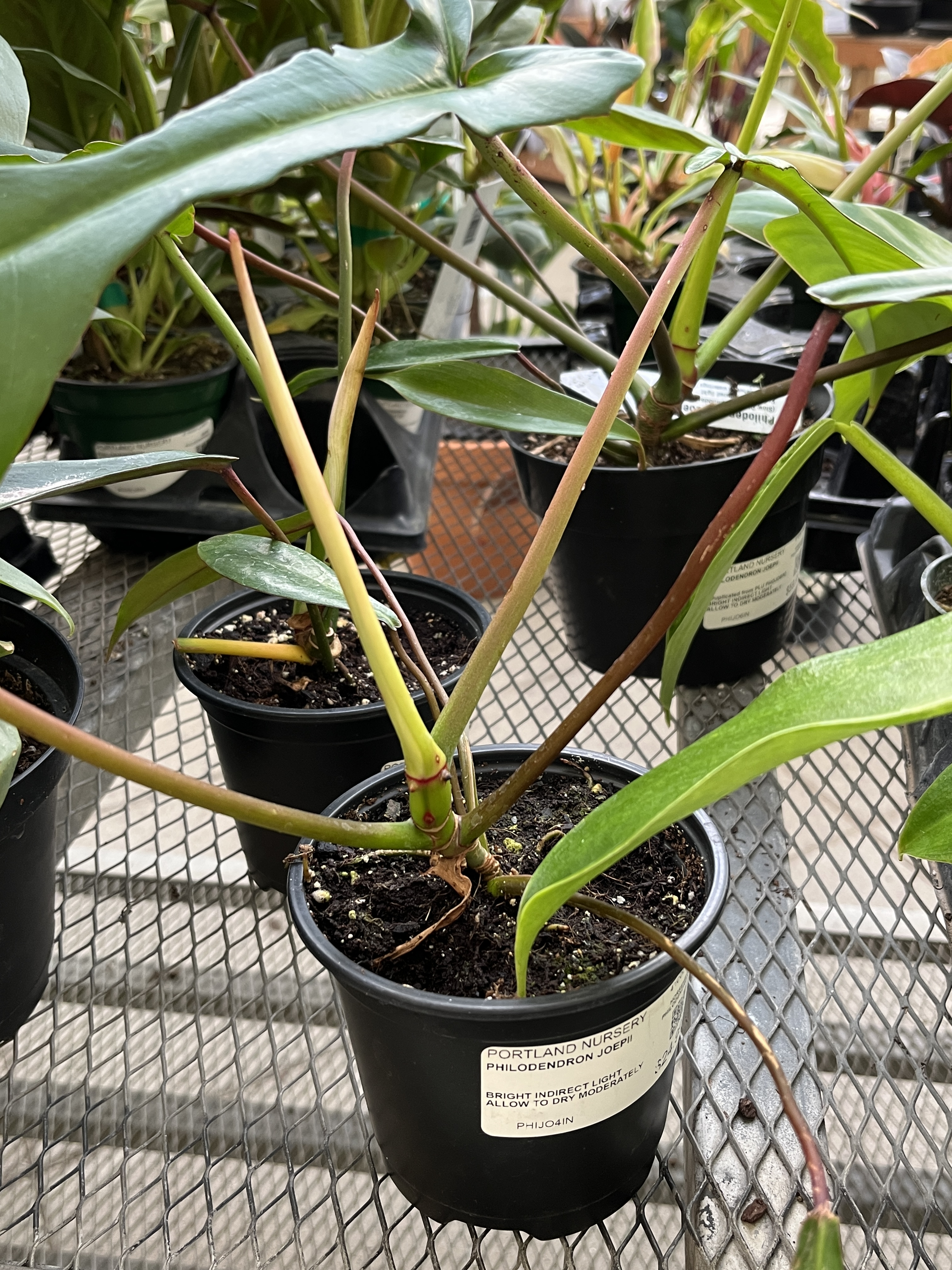
- At a commercial nursery

Scientific classification
- Kingdom: Plantae
- Clade: Tracheophytes
- Clade: Angiosperms
- Clade: Monocots
- Order: Alismatales
- Family: Araceae
- Genus: Philodendron
- Species: P. × joepii

Binomial name
- Philodendron × joepii Croat

= Philodendron × joepii =

Hybrid species of plant

Philodendron × joepii is a naturally occurring hybrid species of flowering plant in the family Araceae, endemic to French Guiana. Philodendron bipennifolium and P. pedatum are thought to be its parents. Its specific epithet is derived from its collector Joep Moonen, who discovered it in 1991 along the Maroni River. Prized by aroid enthusiasts for its unusual scalloped leaves, it is available from specialty retailers.
