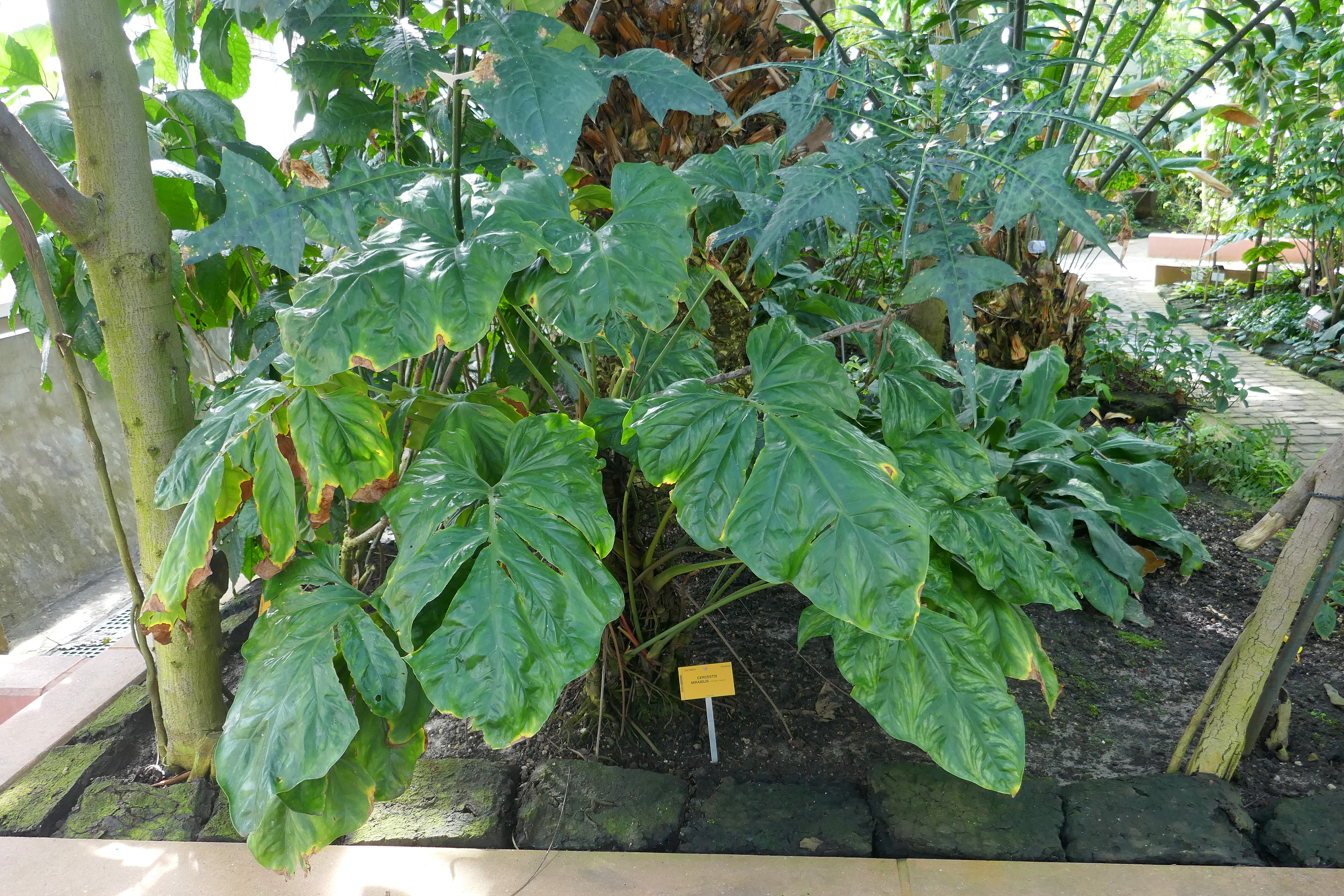
- Cercestis mirabilis

Scientific classification
- Kingdom: Plantae
- Clade: Tracheophytes
- Clade: Angiosperms
- Clade: Monocots
- Order: Alismatales
- Family: Araceae
- Subfamily: Aroideae
- Tribe: Culcasieae
- Genus: Cercestis; Schott

Synonyms
- Alocasiophyllum Engl.; Rhektophyllum N.E.Br

= Cercestis =

Genus of flowering plants

Cercestis is a genus of flowering plants in the family Araceae. The species in this genus are all climbers and are native to Africa. At intervals along the stem they produce long leafless shoots called flagella. Many of the species in Cersestis show signs of fenestration.

== Species ==
- Cercestis afzelii Schott - tropical West Africa from Senegal to Nigeria
- Cercestis camerunensis (Ntépé-Nyamè) Bogner - Nigeria, Cameroon, Gabon
- Cercestis congoensis Engl. -Angola, Zaire, Gabon, Congo-Brazzaville, Central African Republic, Cameroon
- Cercestis dinklagei Engl. - Zaire, Gulf of Guinea Islands, Gabon, Congo-Brazzaville, Cameroon, Nigeria, Sierra Leone, Liberia, Ivory Coast
- Cercestis hepperi Jongkind - Liberia
- Cercestis ivorensis A.Chev - Sierra Leone, Liberia, Ivory Coast, Cameroon, Gabon
- Cercestis kamerunianus (Engl.) N.E.Br. - Nigeria, Cameroon, Gabon
- Cercestis mirabilis (N.E.Br.) Bogner - tropical West Africa from Benin to Angola
- Cercestis sagittatus Engl. - Liberia, Ivory Coast
- Cercestis taiensis Bogner & Knecht - Liberia, Ivory Coast
