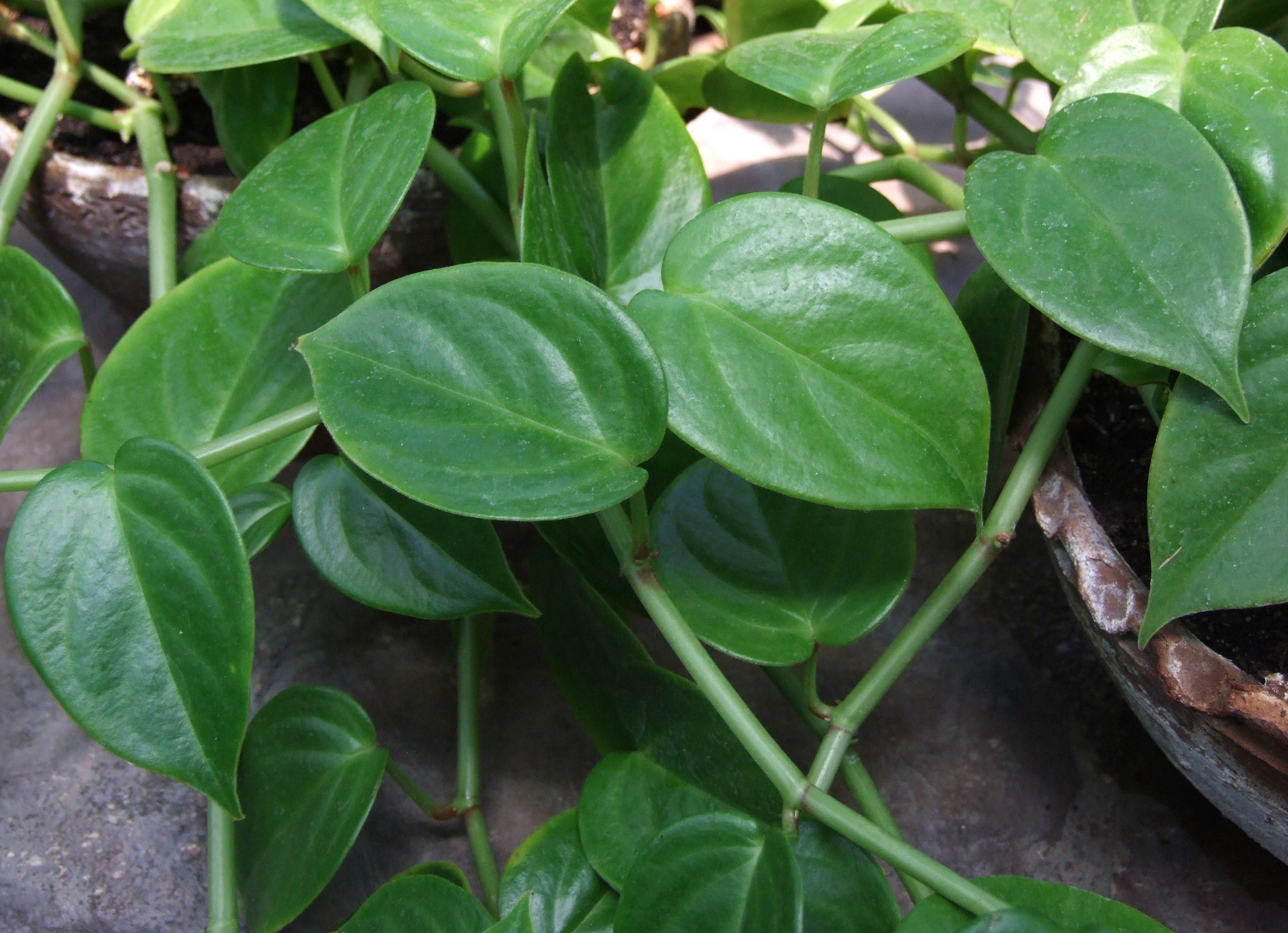

Scientific classification
- Kingdom: Plantae
- Clade: Tracheophytes
- Clade: Angiosperms
- Clade: Magnoliids
- Order: Piperales
- Family: Piperaceae
- Genus: Peperomia
- Species: P. nitida

Binomial name
- Peperomia nitida Dahlst.

= Peperomia nitida =

Species of plant

Peperomia nitida is a species of plant in the genus Peperomia. Its native range is in South America from Brazil to northern Argentina. It can be kept as a houseplant and is sometimes sold as cupid peperomia, or problematically as Peperomia scandens or Peperomia serpens.

== Description ==
Peperomia serpens is a separate species with slightly more rounded leaves and its native region reaches further north to Mexico.

The title scandens is occasionally applied to both, perhaps because both are vining plants (latin term scandens means "climbing"), but officially Peperomia scandens is considered a synonym for Peperomia serpens.
