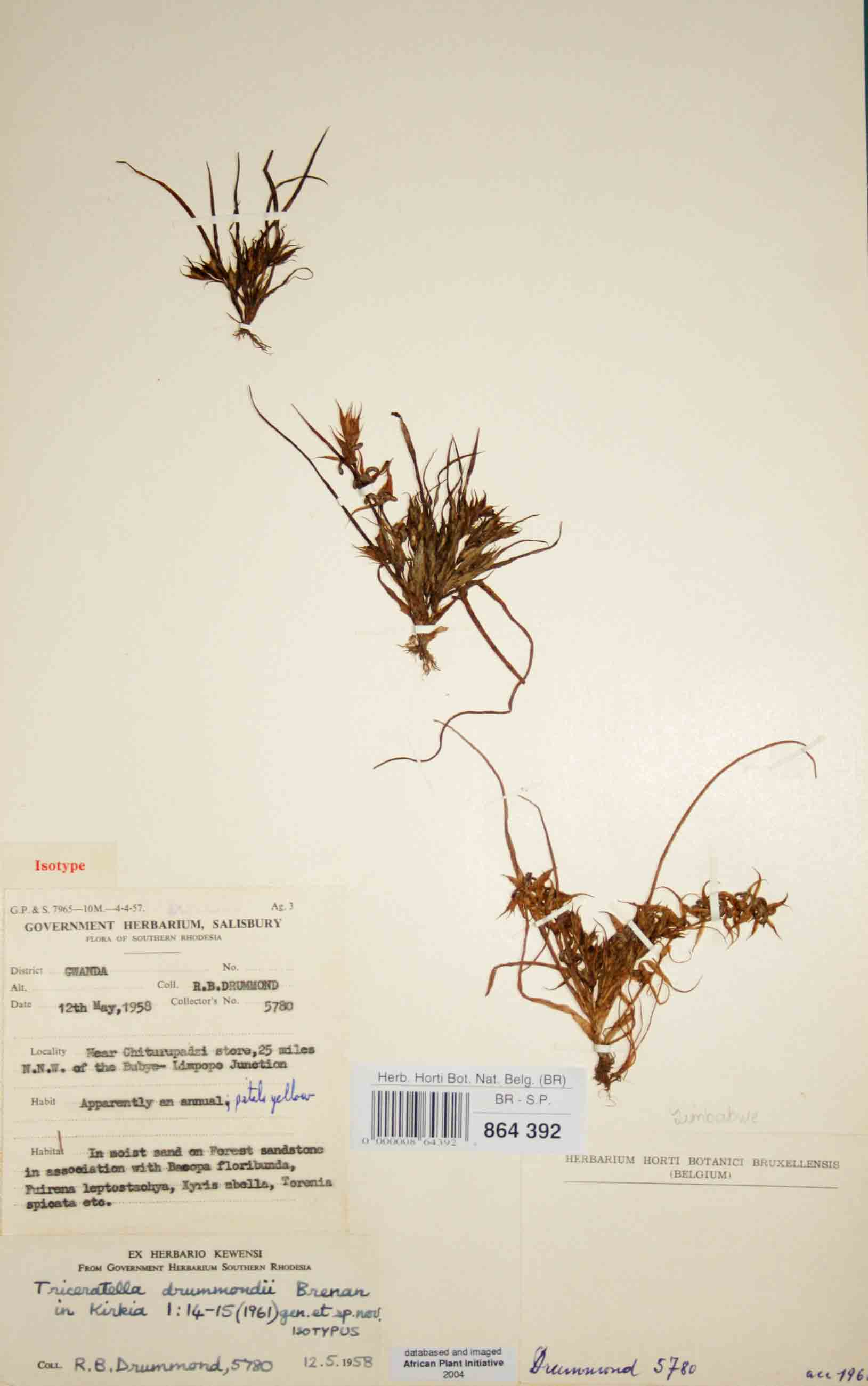

Scientific classification
- Kingdom: Plantae
- Clade: Tracheophytes
- Clade: Angiosperms
- Clade: Monocots
- Clade: Commelinids
- Order: Commelinales
- Family: Commelinaceae
- Subfamily: Cartonematoideae
- Tribe: Triceratelleae
- Genus: Triceratella; Brenan
- Species: T. drummondii

Binomial name
- Triceratella drummondii Brenan

= Triceratella =

Genus of flowering plants

Triceratella is a genus of annual monocotyledonous flowering plants in the dayflower family. The genus consists of a single species, Triceratella drummondii. It is known to occur in Zimbabwe and Mozambique, but has only been collected twice. Because of its rarity, DNA sequences have never been used to determine its relatives, but it is believed to be closely related to the early diverging genus Cartonema, with which it shares a number of characters unique for the dayflower family, such as a yellow flowers, glandular hairs, and a lack of glandular microhairs. It differs from Cartonema, however, in having raphides, which all other members of the Commelinaceae have, although they occur in a unique position next to the leaf veins in Triceratella.
