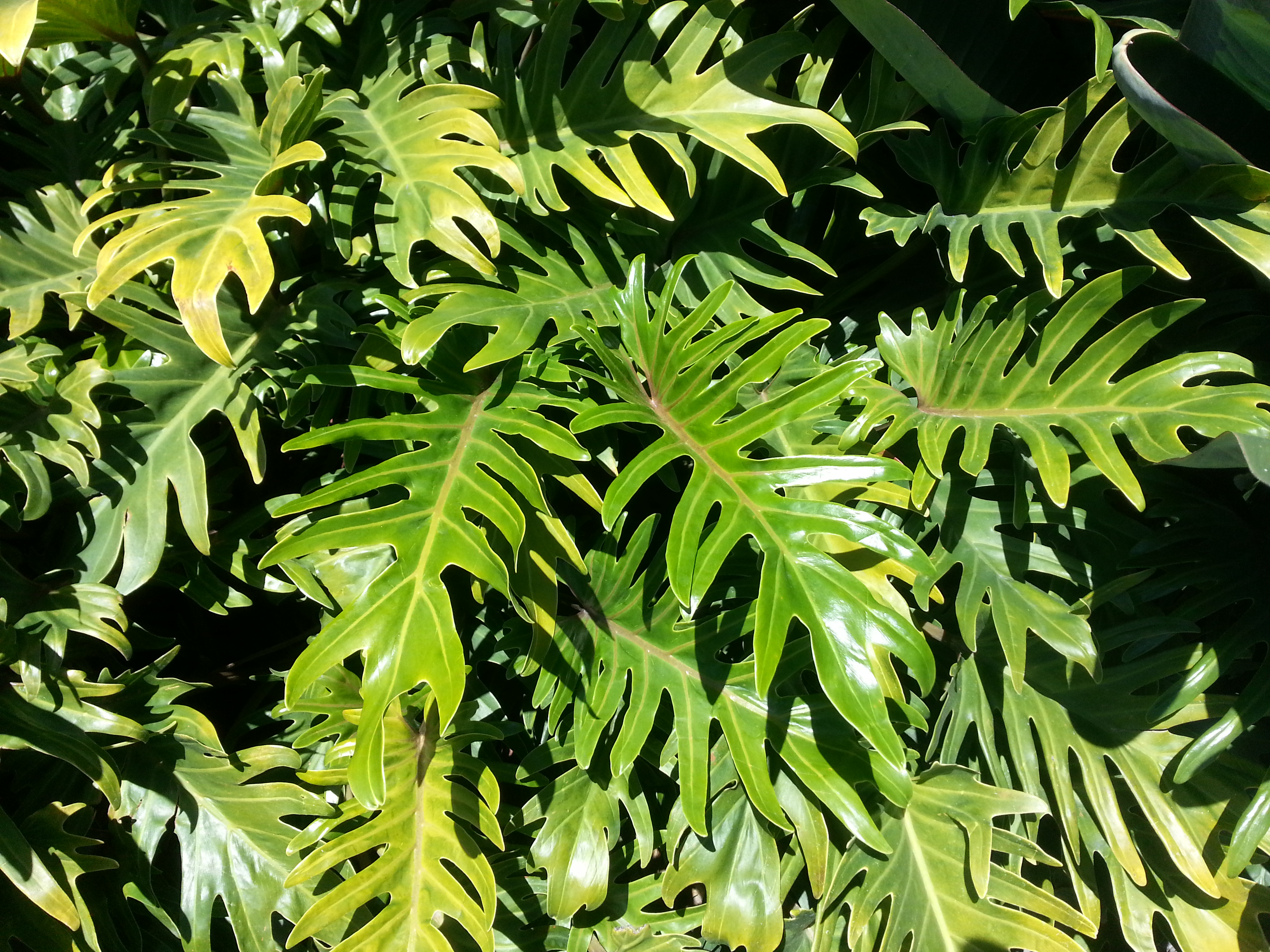

Scientific classification
- Kingdom: Plantae
- Clade: Tracheophytes
- Clade: Angiosperms
- Clade: Monocots
- Order: Alismatales
- Family: Araceae
- Genus: Philodendron
- Species: P. xanadu

Binomial name
- Philodendron xanadu Croat, J.Boos & Mayo

Synonyms
- Thaumatophyllum xanadu (Croat, Mayo & J.Boos) Sakur., Calazans & Mayo

= Philodendron xanadu =

Species of flowering plant

Philodendron xanadu, synonym Thaumatophyllum xanadu, is a perennial plant belonging to the arum family Araceae. It is native to south Brazil and Paraguay, but is widely cultivated as a landscape plant in tropical, subtropical, and warm temperate climates.

== History ==
This plant was originally reported to be a selected chance seedling that arose in 1983 in a Western Australian nursery. It was thought to be a sport or hybrid of Philodendron bipinnatifidum, and named Philodendron 'Winterbourn' and protected under Plant Breeder Rights in Australia. It was also sold under the name P. 'Showboat'. It was renamed 'Xanadu' by House Plants of Australia and released as their plant of the year in 1988.

The cultivar name 'Winterbourn' was trademarked in the United States on January 19, 1988. That patent has since expired and there have since been substantiated claims that this plant is not a hybrid or nursery-grown cultivar, but actually originated from seed collected from a wild plant in Brazil. This plant was described as Philodendron xanadu Croat, Mayo & J.Boos.

== Description ==
=== Growth habit ===
Philodendron xanadu is a perennial herb and forms dense clumps growing up to 5 feet (1.5 metres) tall and 5 ft (1.5 m) wide. It has glossy green, deeply dissected, lobed leaves up to 40 cm (16 in) long by 30 cm (12 in) wide. Its flowers have dark red spathes. It may occasionally produce aerial roots.

=== Distinguishing features ===
Philodendron xanadu is placed in the Meconostigma subgenus of Philodendron. "It differs from all other species of Meconostigma in details of the sexual parts of its spadix, the shape of the leaf scars on the rhizomes, shape of leaf blade, intravaginal squamules, etc".

== Cultivation ==
Philodendron xanadu is cultivated as a landscape plant in tropical, subtropical and warm temperate countries including warmer parts of the United States, such as Florida, Hawaii and California, South Africa, Australia and northern New Zealand. It is grown as a houseplant in cooler regions.

== Toxicology ==
Philodendron species are poisonous to vertebrates, but vary in their toxicity levels. They contain calcium oxalate crystals in raphide bundles, which are poisonous and irritating. The sap may cause skin irritation. Chewing and/or ingesting parts of the plant may result in severe swelling and compromised respiratory functions.

== Gallery ==
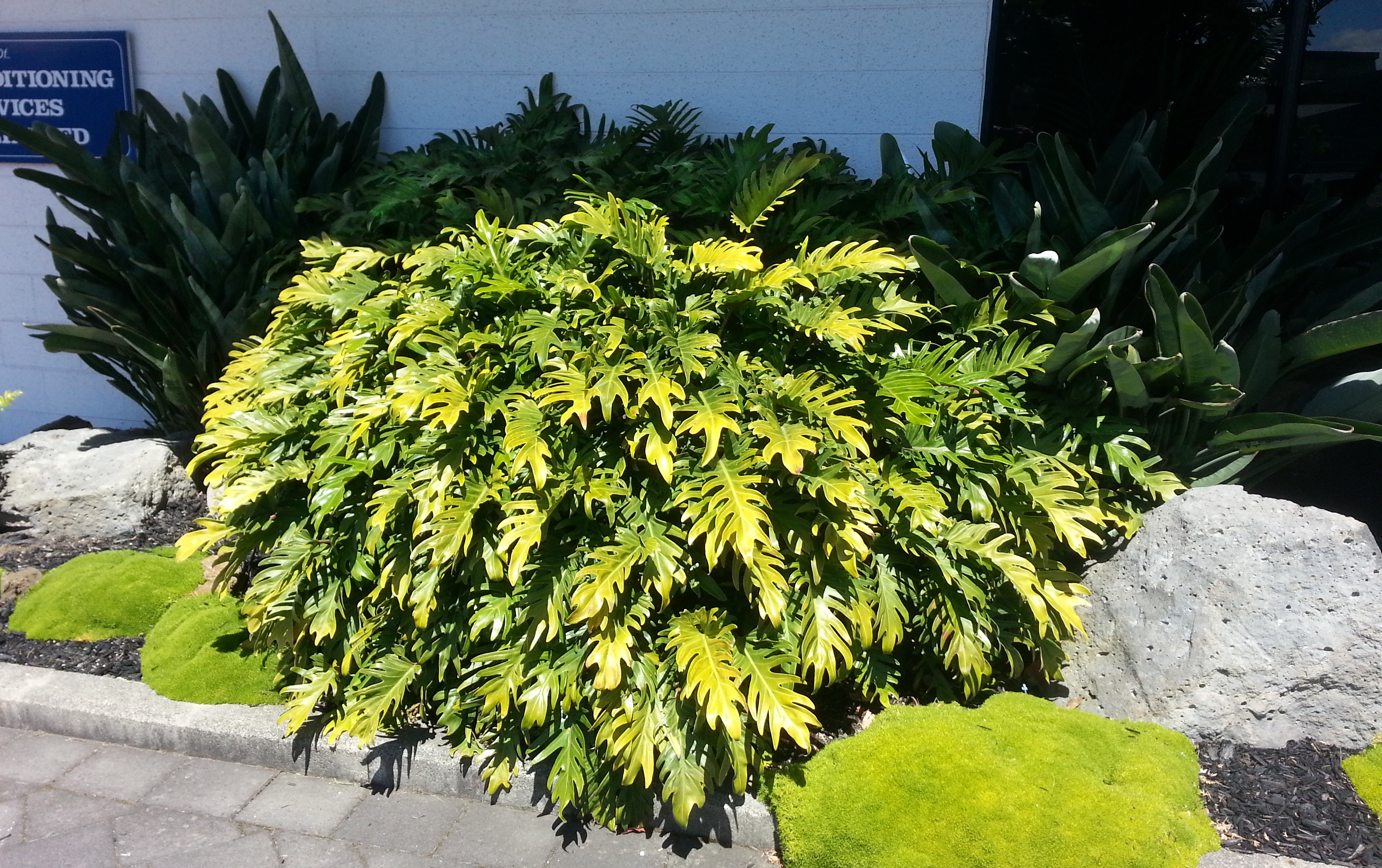
Philodendron xanadu, large clump growing in Penrose, Auckland, New Zealand

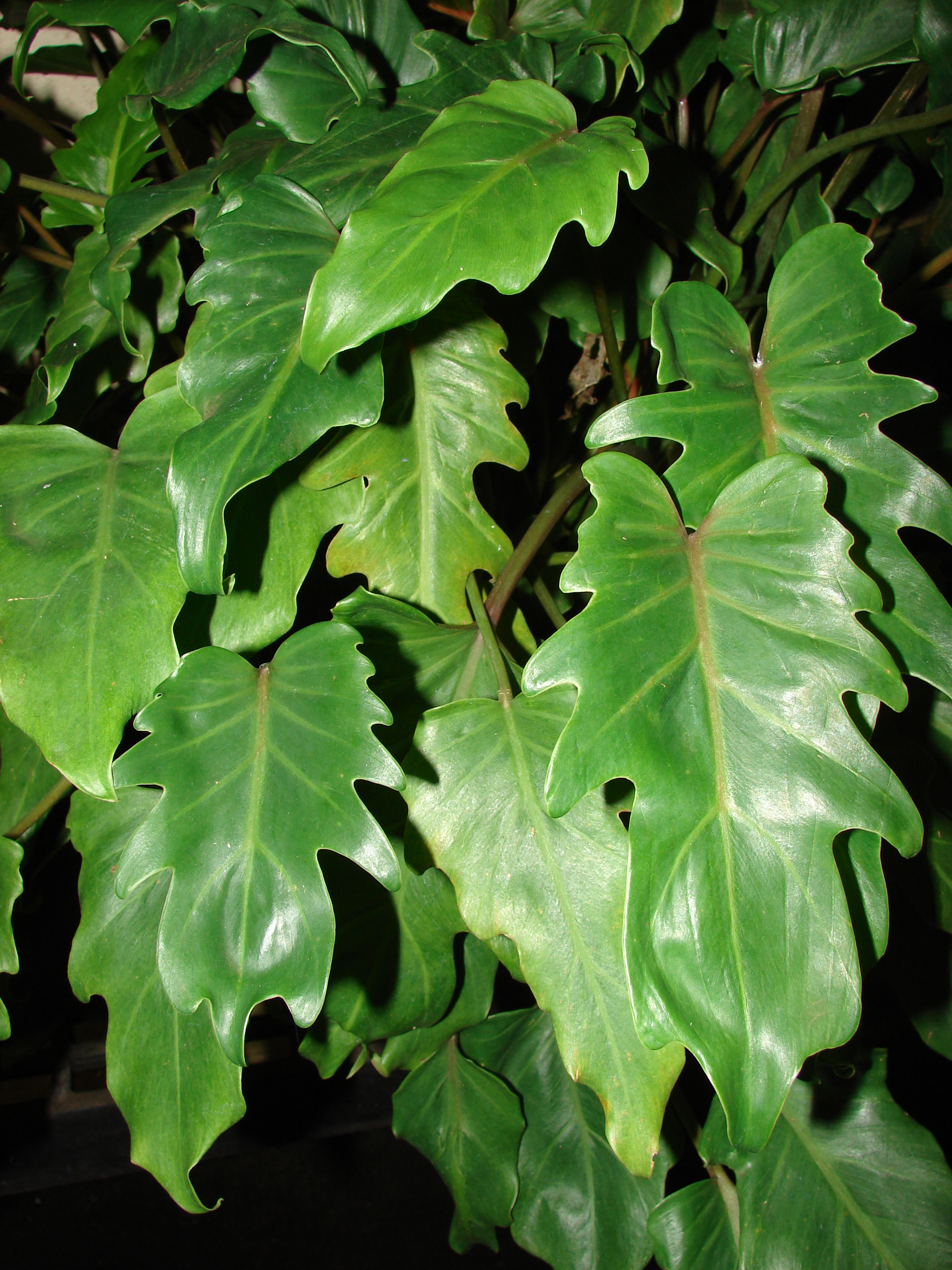
Juvenile leaves of Philodendron xanadu
