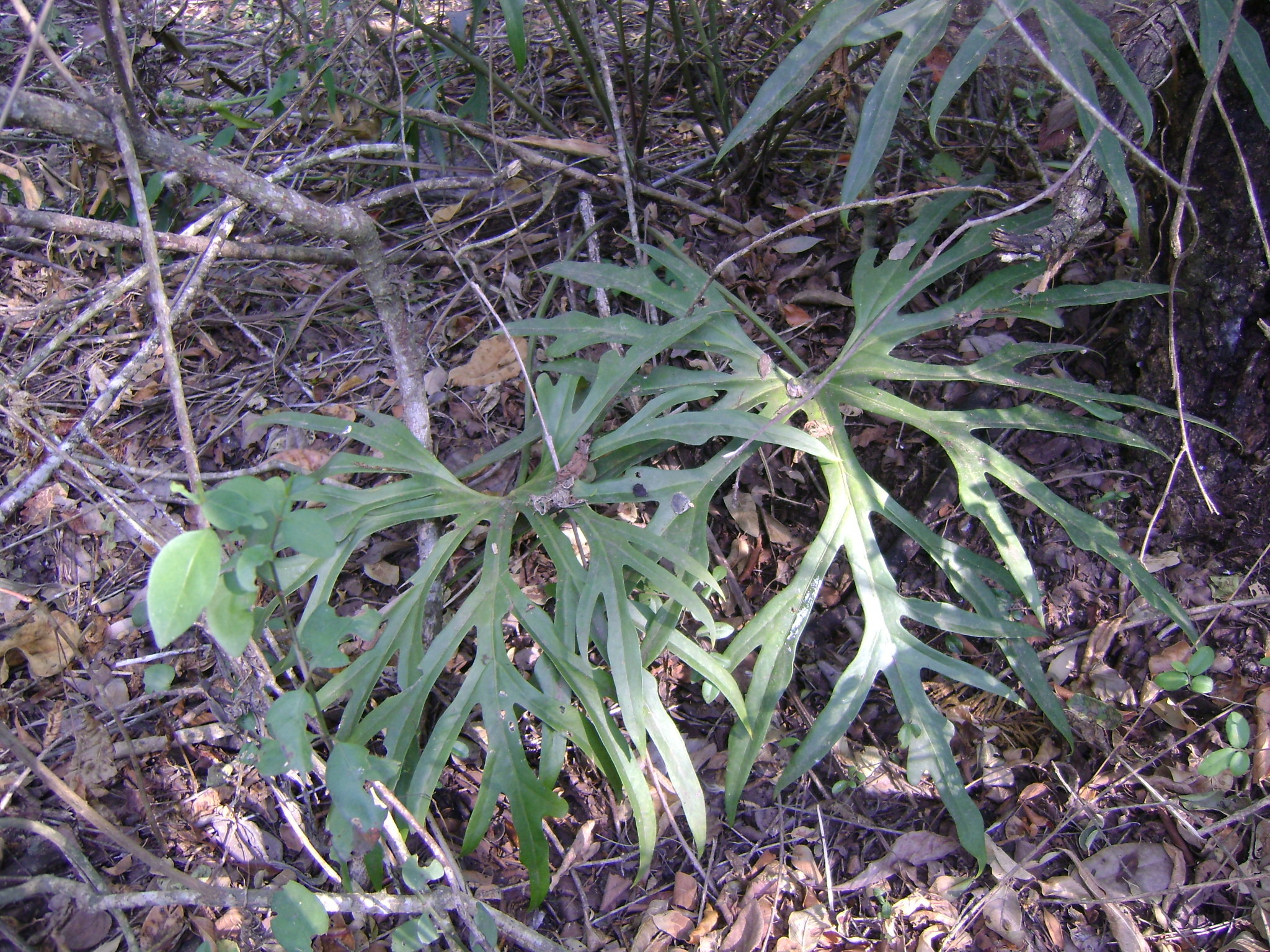
- A. podophyllum growing in the wild in Veracruz

Scientific classification
- Kingdom: Plantae
- Clade: Tracheophytes
- Clade: Angiosperms
- Clade: Monocots
- Order: Alismatales
- Family: Araceae
- Genus: Anthurium
- Species: A. podophyllum

Binomial name
- Anthurium podophyllum (Cham. & Schltdl.) Kunth

= Anthurium podophyllum =

Species of plant

Anthurium podophyllum is a species of plant in the genus Anthurium native to coastal areas of the Mexican states of Veracruz and Oaxaca. A terrestrial species, it grows in tropical forest understories in seasonally dry areas. It is named for its palmate leaves that somewhat resemble plants in the (unrelated) genus Podophyllum, and which have many subdivisions. It is related to other terrestrial Anthurium with similar leaf morphology in the section Schizoplacium, such as Anthurium pedoradiatum, and produces orange berries.
