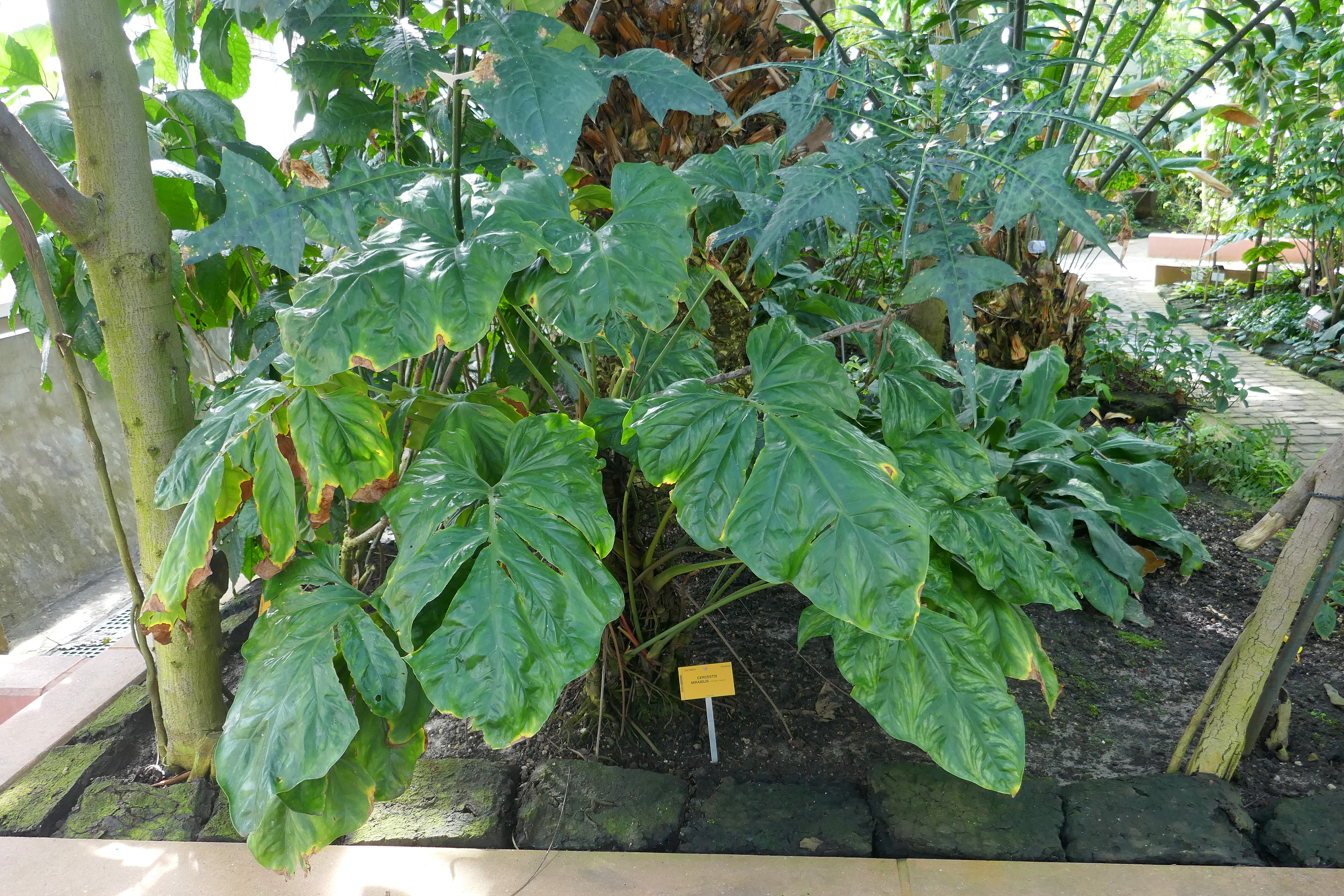
- At Meise Botanic Garden, Belgium

Scientific classification
- Kingdom: Plantae
- Clade: Tracheophytes
- Clade: Angiosperms
- Clade: Monocots
- Order: Alismatales
- Family: Araceae
- Genus: Cercestis
- Species: C. mirabilis

Binomial name
- Cercestis mirabilis (N.E.Br.) Bogner

= Cercestis mirabilis =

Type of plant

Cercestis mirabilis is a perennial herb that can grow up to 3.3 m (11 ft) tall. It is an obligate climber, which means that it requires support to grow. The stem is about 2.5 cm (0.98 in) thick and can climb up to a height of 9 m (30 ft), rooting as it climbs. The juvenile leaves are saggitate with white markings. The adult leaves are about 60 cm (24 in) long, simple, broad, and glabrous, with a terete petiole that is 25–60 cm (9.8–23.6 in) long and grooved at the base in the adult plant. It is native to tropical Africa.
