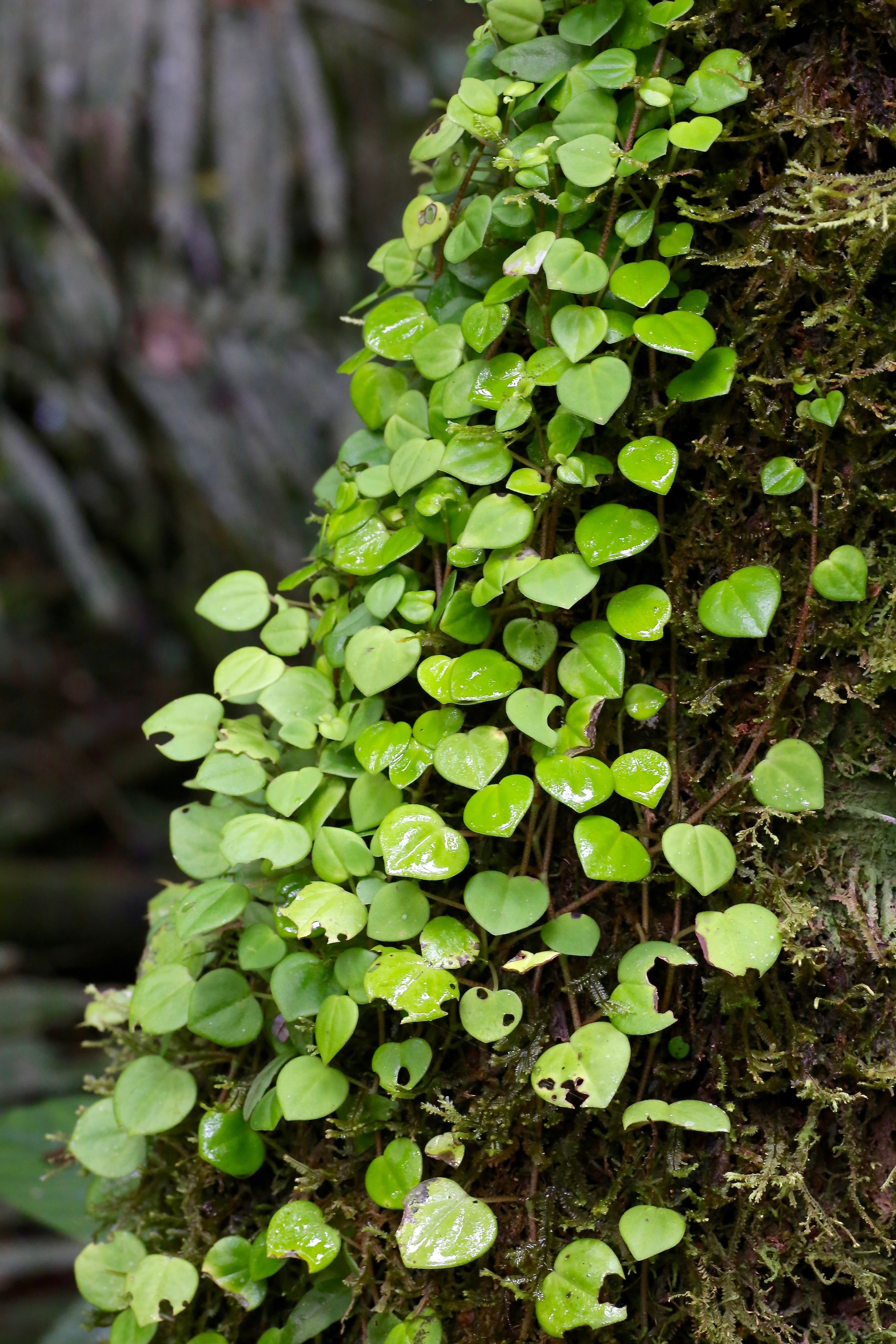
- Climbing a tree in the wild in Ecuador

Scientific classification
- Kingdom: Plantae
- Clade: Tracheophytes
- Clade: Angiosperms
- Clade: Magnoliids
- Order: Piperales
- Family: Piperaceae
- Genus: Peperomia
- Species: P. serpens

Binomial name
- Peperomia serpens (Sw.) G.Don

Synonyms
- List: Acrocarpidium guildingianum (Spreng.) Miq.; Acrocarpidium pulicare (Opiz) Miq.; Acrocarpidium repens (Kunth) Miq.; Acrocarpidium repens f. minus Miq.; Acrocarpidium scandens (Ruiz & Pav.) Miq.; Acrocarpidium serpens (Sw.) Miq.; Peperomia guildingiana (Spreng.) A.Dietr.; Peperomia ionophylla Griseb.; Peperomia myosurus Willd. ex A.Dietr.; Peperomia pulicaris Opiz; Peperomia reniformis Hook.; Peperomia repens Kunth; Peperomia scandens Ruiz & Pav.; Peperomia scandens var. fertilior C.DC.; Peperomia scandens var. longispica Trel.; Piper bracteatum J.V.Thomps.; Piper guildingianum Spreng.; Piper herbaceum Miq.; Piper myosuros Willd. ex D.Dietr.; Piper pulicare (Opiz) D.Dietr.; Piper repens Poir.; Piper scandens (Ruiz & Pav.) Vahl; Piper serpens Sw.; Verhuellia serpens (Sw.) Miq.

= Peperomia serpens =

Species of flowering plant

Peperomia serpens, the vining peperomia, is a species of flowering plant in the genus Peperomia and family Piperaceae, native to the New World Tropics. The plant is perennial.

The name Peperomia serpens has in the past also been used to describe Peperomia dimota and Peperomia subrotundifolia. In addition the terms Peperomia serpens and Peperomia scandens are sometimes falsely used for Peperomia nitida, perhaps because both are similar vining plants. The Royal Horticultural Society has bestowed the Award of Garden Merit to "Peperomia scandens" as a houseplant, however it is not clear whether this means Peperomia serpens or Peperomia nitida.
