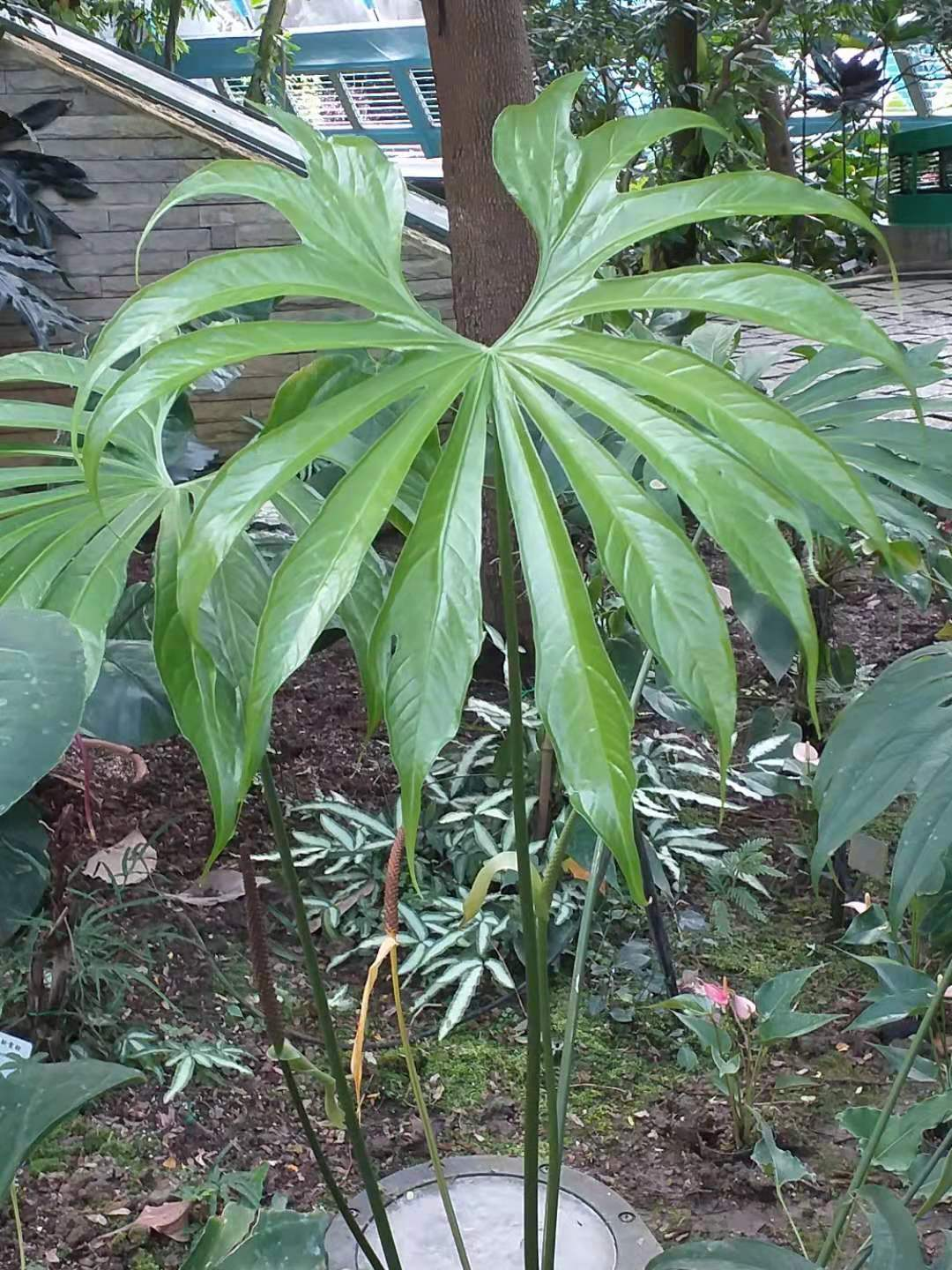
- A mature leaf of Anthurium pedatoradiatum in Botanical Garden of National Museum of Natural Science, Taichung, Taiwan

Scientific classification
- Kingdom: Plantae
- Clade: Tracheophytes
- Clade: Angiosperms
- Clade: Monocots
- Order: Alismatales
- Family: Araceae
- Genus: Anthurium
- Species: A. pedatoradiatum

Binomial name
- Anthurium pedatoradiatum Schott

= Anthurium pedatoradiatum =

Species of flowering plant

Anthurium pedatoradiatum or Anthurium Fingers is a species of plant in the genus Anthurium native to southern Mexico. A. pedatoradiatum has leaves with deep finger-like sections, and is terrestrial. Its natural habitat is from sea level up to 1,000 meters (3,300 ft) in the Mexican states of Veracruz, Tabasco, and Chiapas. It is related to other Anthurium in the section Schizoplacium such as Anthurium podophyllum, and its species name in Latin refers to the radiating growth of its palm-like leaves.
