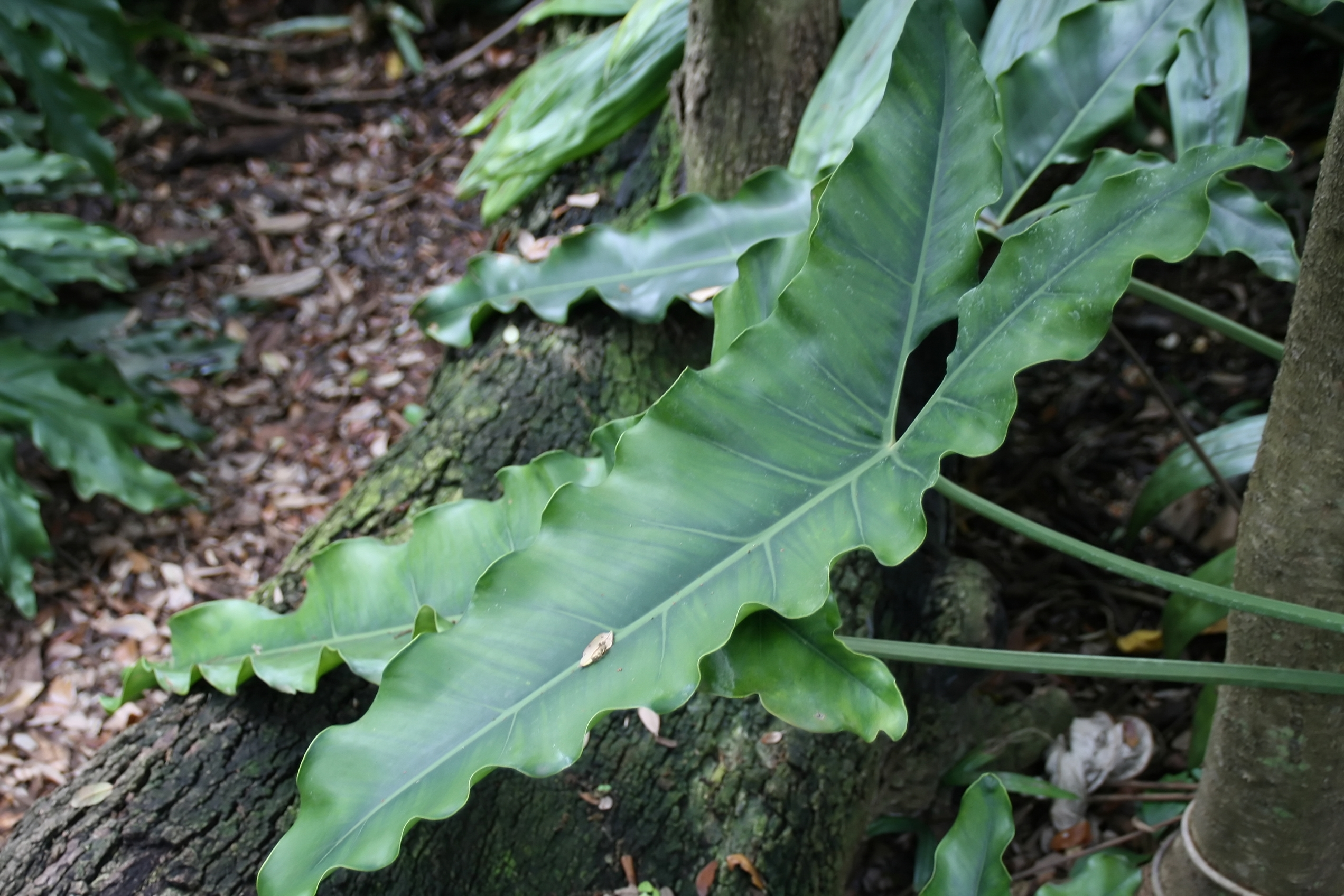
- At the Fairchild Tropical Botanic Garden

Scientific classification
- Kingdom: Plantae
- Clade: Tracheophytes
- Clade: Angiosperms
- Clade: Monocots
- Order: Alismatales
- Family: Araceae
- Genus: Philodendron
- Species: P. stenolobum

Binomial name
- Philodendron stenolobum E.G.Gonç.

Synonyms
- Thaumatophyllum stenolobum (E.G.Gonç.) Sakur., Calazans & Mayo

= Philodendron stenolobum =

Species of plant

Philodendron stenolobum is a species of flowering plant in the family Araceae. It is native to Espírito Santo, Brazil. A epiphytic subshrub, it is typically found in the wet tropical biome, but along with other members of its subgenus Meconostigma it is believed to have originated in the Cerrado.
