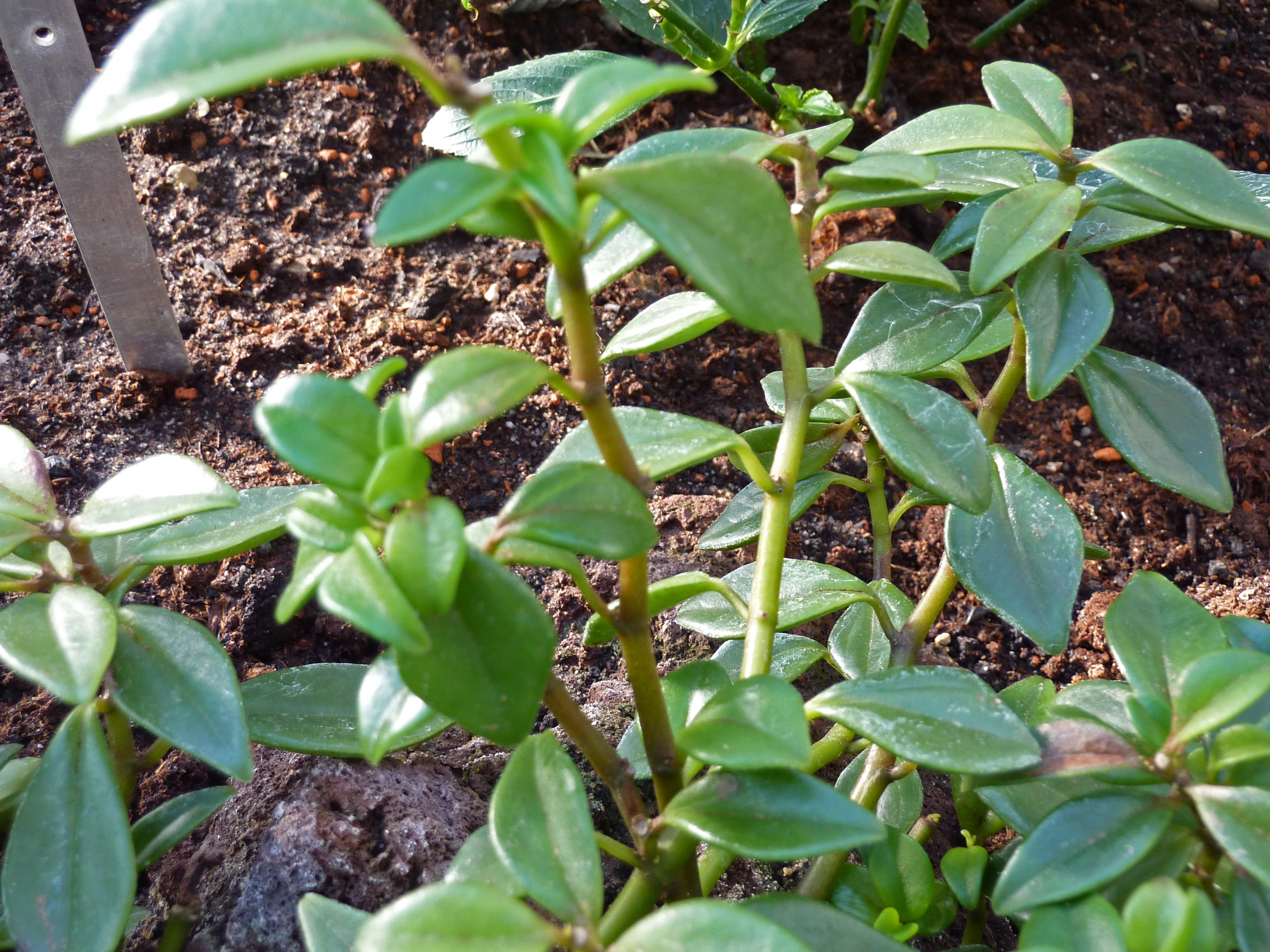

Scientific classification
- Kingdom: Plantae
- Clade: Embryophytes
- Clade: Tracheophytes
- Clade: Angiosperms
- Clade: Magnoliids
- Order: Piperales
- Family: Piperaceae
- Genus: Peperomia
- Species: P. vinasiana

Binomial name
- Peperomia vinasiana C.DC.

Synonyms
- Peperomia macrocarpa C.DC.; Peperomia vinasiana var. macrocarpa

= Peperomia vinasiana =

Species of flowering plant

Peperomia vinasiana is a species of epiphyte or lithophyte plant from the genus Peperomia. It was first described by Casimir de Candolle and the species was published in the book "Bulletin de la Société Royale de Botanique de Belgique 30(1): 231. 1891[1892]". It grows mainly on the wet tropical biomes.

== Etymology ==
Vinasiana means Vinasian. Vinasian refers to the district of Juan Viñas.

== Distribution ==
It is endemic to Costa Rica. The type specimen was collected by Henri François Pittier in the district of Juan Viñas.

== Description ==
Alternate leaves moderately petiolate at the base, cordate, apex abbreviate, acuminate on both sides, glabrous with nine nerves, terminal catkins much exceeding the leaves, ovariorhachi imprinted above obliquely shielded shield with obtuse or subacute apex, ovate berry apex obliquely and obtusely subcutes. It has erect glabrous branches in the dry about 2 millimetres thick leathery texture. Limbs are 8 centimetres long and 4 centimetres wide, in dry firm opaque. Petioles are 1 1/2 centimetres long. The berries are 15 centimetres long and 2 millimetres thick, with peduncles 2 centimetres long. Circular plates. Berries 1 1/2 millimetres long at the base.

Peperomia Aguacatensis is related, distinguished by larger leaves and firmer in the dry and longer catkins and obtuse scutella of the ovary.
