= Acacia robeorum =

Robe's wattle

Scientific classification
- Kingdom: Plantae
- Clade: Tracheophytes
- Clade: Angiosperms
- Clade: Eudicots
- Clade: Rosids
- Order: Fabales
- Family: Fabaceae
- Subfamily: Caesalpinioideae
- Clade: Mimosoid clade
- Genus: Acacia
- Species: A. robeorum

Binomial name
- Acacia robeorum Maslin
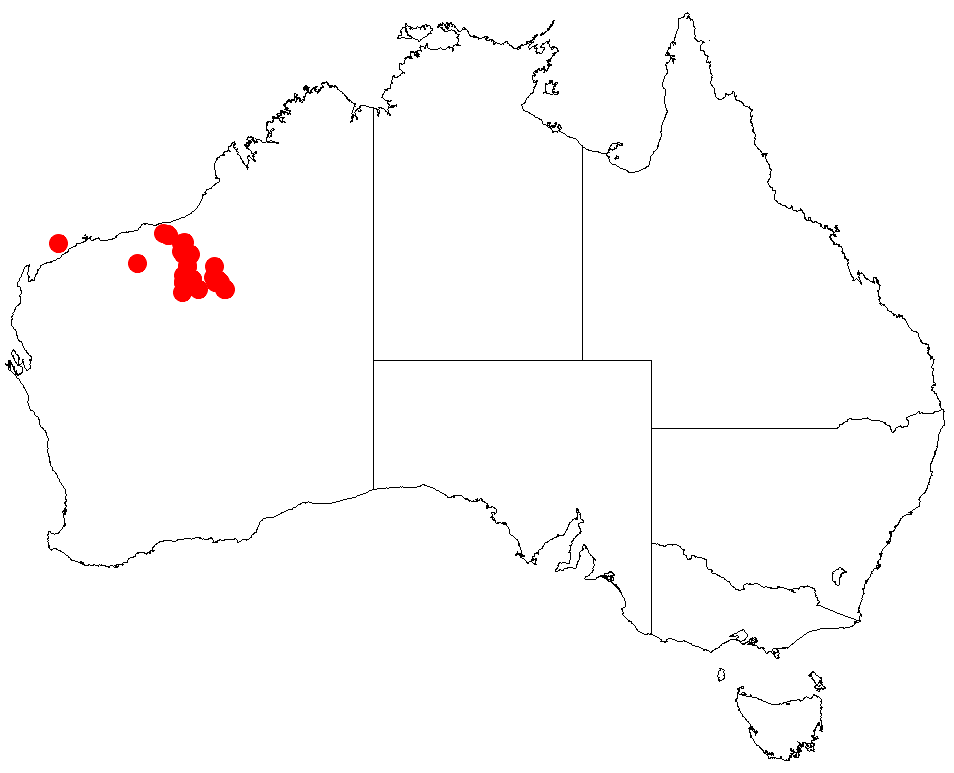
- Occurrence data from AVH

Species of legume

Acacia robeorum, commonly known as Robe's wattle, is a shrub of the genus Acacia and the subgenus Phyllodineae that is endemic to north western Australia.

== Description ==
The shrub typically grows to a height of 2 to 3 m (6 ft 7 in to 9 ft 10 in) and have a diffuse, spreading, openly branched and multi-stemmed habit. The main stems are usually slightly crooked and support an open croen with smooth grey coloured bark on the main stems that becomes a light bronze colour on the on upper branches. The terete and glabrous branchlets have yellowish to bronze coloured but obscure ribbing and spint stipules with a length of 1.5 to 4 mm (0.059 to 0.157 in) that are found less as the plants ages. Like most species of Acacia, it has phyllodes rather than true leaves. The thick, fleshy and evergreen phyllodes have a linear to narrowly linear-oblanceolate shape with a length of 15 to 35 mm (0.59 to 1.38 in) and a width of 1 to 4 mm (0.039 to 0.157 in)and have an obscure midrib.

== Distribution ==
It is native to an area in the Kimberley and Pilbara regions of Western Australia. The range of the shrub extends from around Marble Bar and Pardoo Station in the north of the Pilbara down to around Ethel Creek Station in the south and out to Rudall River National Park in the Little Sandy Desert where it is often situated along drainage lines growing in sandy loam or skeletal sandy soils over laterite, granite or quartz bedrock as a part of spinifex grassland communities.

== See also ==
- List of Acacia species
