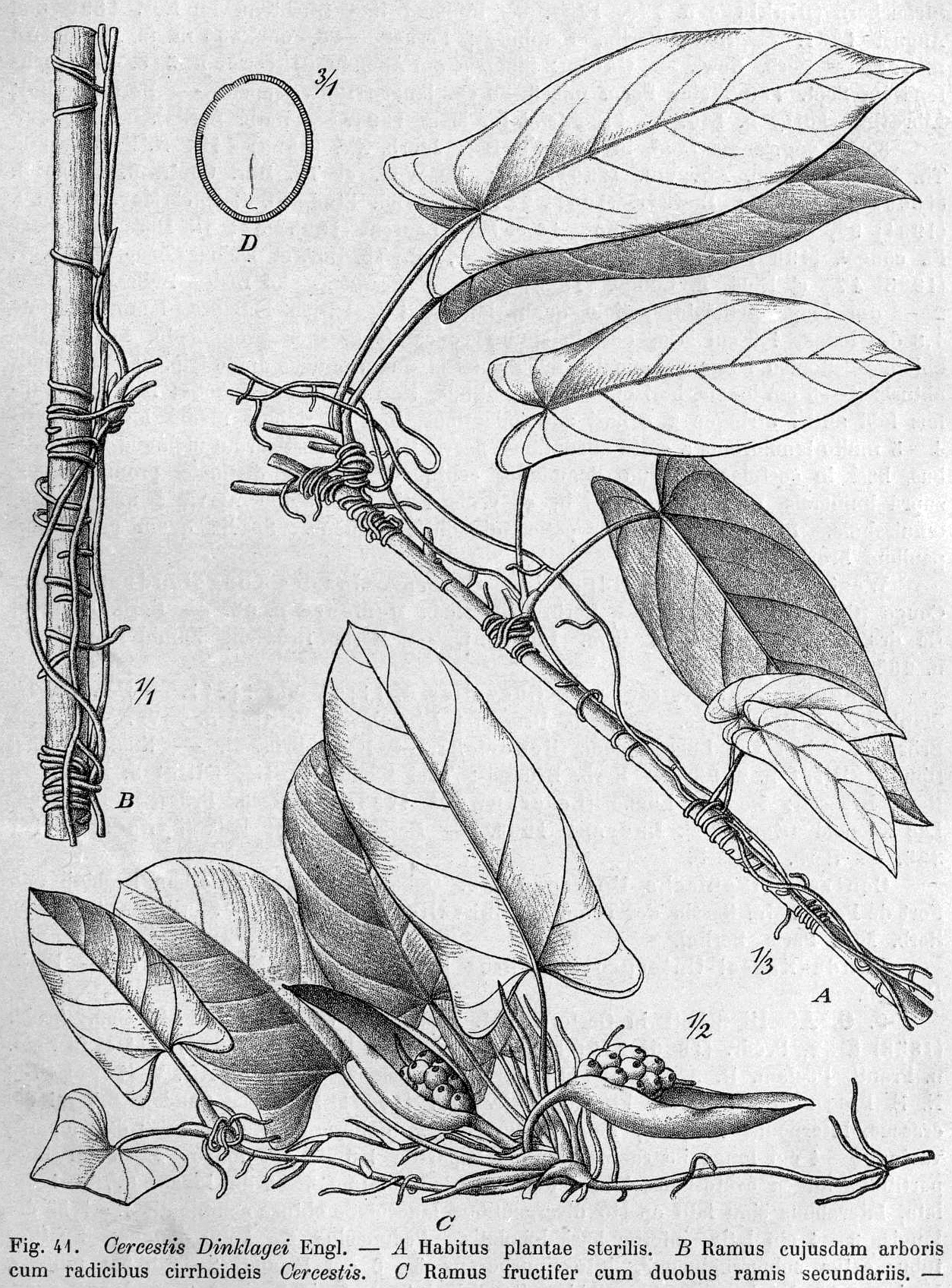
- Botanical drawing, 1911

Scientific classification
- Kingdom: Plantae
- Clade: Tracheophytes
- Clade: Angiosperms
- Clade: Monocots
- Order: Alismatales
- Family: Araceae
- Genus: Cercestis
- Species: C. dinklagei

Binomial name
- Cercestis dinklagei Engl.

Synonyms
- Cercestis elliotii Engl.; Cercestis ledermannii Engl.; Cercestis stigmaticus N.E.Br.

= Cercestis dinklagei =

Flowering plant species

Cercestis dinklagei is a species of flowering plant in the family Araceae that is native to West and West Central tropical Africa. It is a slender stem climber that produces long leafless shoots called flagella at intervals along the stem. The leaves of Cercestis dinklagei are petiolate and glabrous, with a petiole that is 4-8 inches long and a blade that is 6-10 inches long. The blade is elongated-sagit-tate-lanceolate or hastate, with a front lobe that is oblong-lanceolate and acuminate.

There is no information available on the color of the spathe or spadix of Cercestis dinklagei. However, a related species, Cercestis stigmaticus, has a purple base on its spathe and a creamy-colored spadix.
