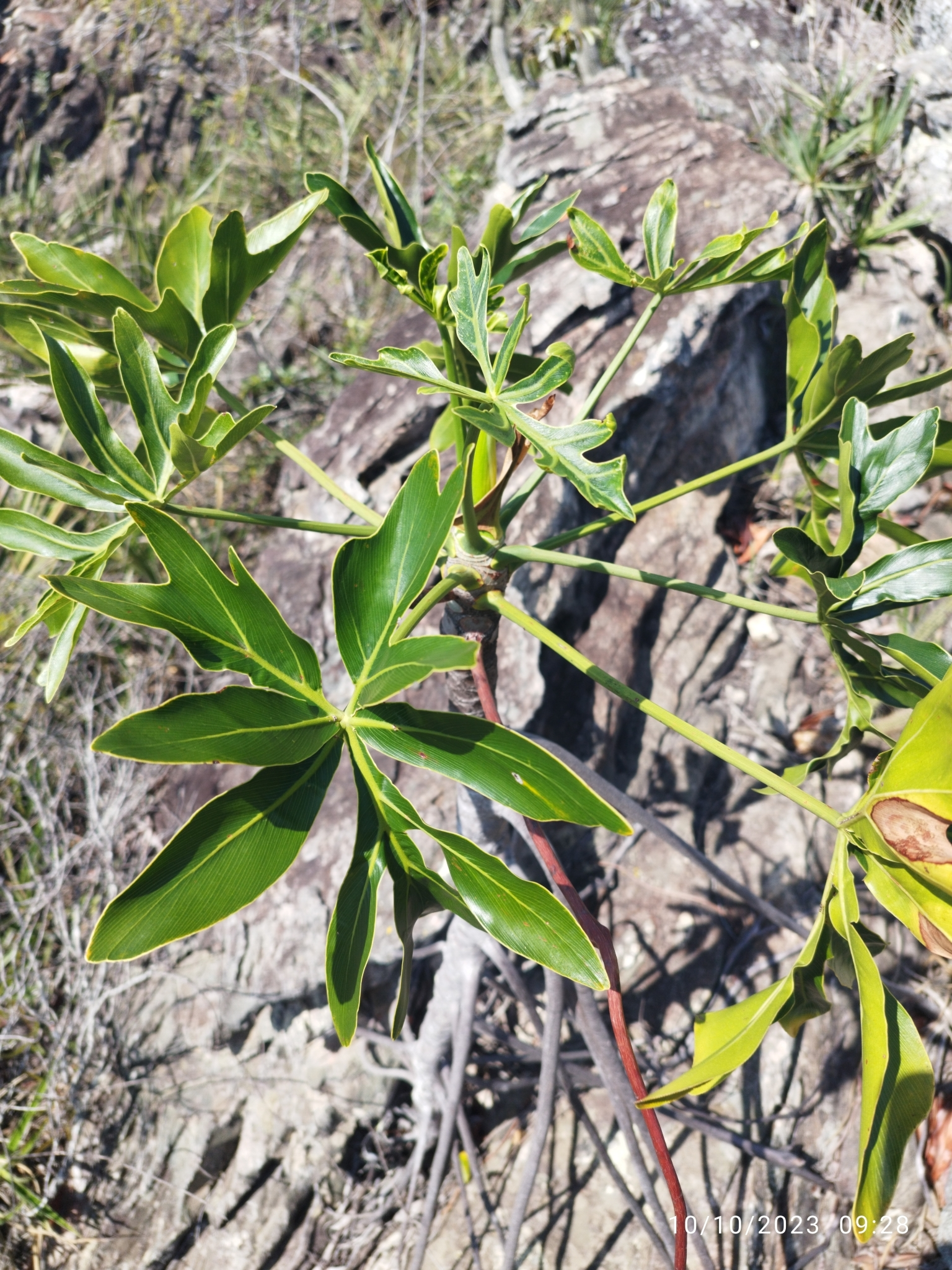

Scientific classification
- Kingdom: Plantae
- Clade: Tracheophytes
- Clade: Angiosperms
- Clade: Monocots
- Order: Alismatales
- Family: Araceae
- Genus: Philodendron
- Species: P. adamantinum

Binomial name
- Philodendron adamantinum Mart. ex Schott

Synonyms
- Thaumatophyllum adamantinum (Mart. ex Schott) Sakur., Calazans & Mayo

= Philodendron adamantinum =

Plant native to South America

Philodendron adamantinum, synonym Thaumatophyllum adamantinum, is a plant in the genus Philodendron, in the family Araceae. It is native to South America, namely to Southeast Brazil, but is also cultivated as a houseplant in cooler climates.

On the basis of DNA sequencing, Philodendron adamantinum was transferred to Thaumatophyllum adamantinum. However, the genus Thaumatophyllum was not accepted by Plants of the World Online and other taxonomic databases as of October 2025.

== Growth ==
Philodendron adamantinum is a shrub that grows up to 5 feet (1.5 m) tall, and its adventitious roots can spread 33 feet (10 m) in all directions.

It grows in the seasonally dry tropical biome.

The stems grow both decumbent or erect and are both green and glossy. The leaves are glossy green, oval in shape, and have 3-5 laterally divided lobes. Leaves are widest as the midpoint, shorter both at the apex and at the base. While green, some leaves may be slightly pinkish near the petiole. Leaves are 6.6 inches (170 mm) to 12 inches (300 mm) in width.

=== Reproduction ===
Philodendron adamantinum reproduces sexually through flowers and stamens. Flowers are inflorescent with a 2–5 cm peduncle, 6.4-11.4 cm single leaf surrounding the stamen (called a spathe), and a 5.5 cm-12.5 cm spadix. The spathe is green with a creamy white inner surface. Flowers have 5 staminodes and cylindrical petals. Berries are oblong and generate 2.5 mm long oblong seeds containing oily droplets.

Philodendron adamantinum can be propagated by taking cuttings. A section with multiple aerial roots and leaves can be rooted in water, soil, or in sphagnum moss.

== Toxicology ==
Philodendron species are poisonous to vertebrates, but vary in their toxicity levels. They contain calcium oxalate crystals in raphide bundles, which are poisonous and irritating. The sap may cause skin irritation.
