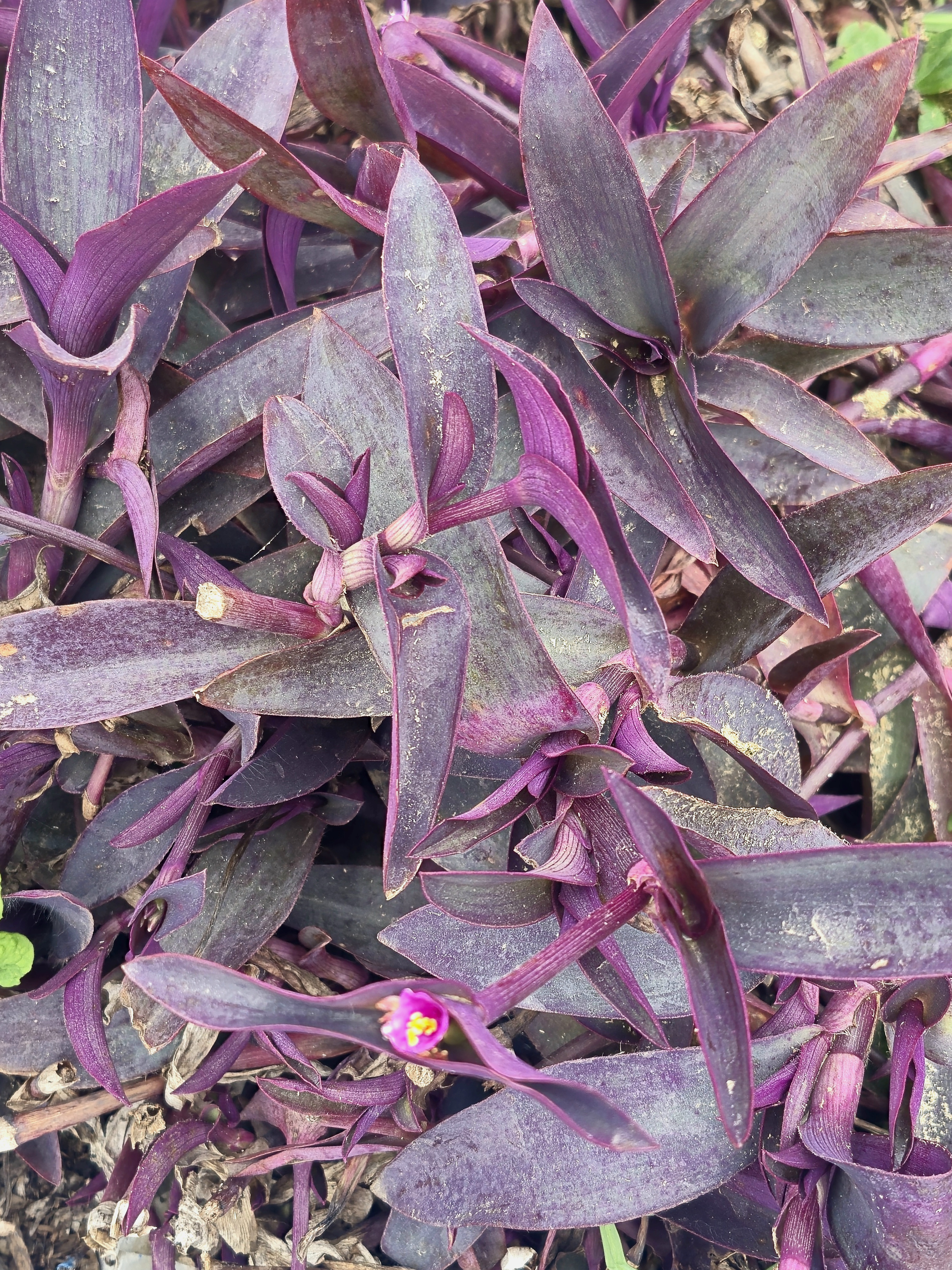
- Tradescantia pallida 'Purpurea'

Scientific classification
- Kingdom: Plantae
- Clade: Embryophytes
- Clade: Tracheophytes
- Clade: Spermatophytes
- Clade: Angiosperms
- Clade: Monocots
- Clade: Commelinids
- Order: Commelinales
- Family: Commelinaceae
- Genus: Tradescantia
- Species: T. pallida

Binomial name
- Tradescantia pallida (Rose) D.R.Hunt

Synonyms
- Setcreasea pallida Rose; Setcreasea purpurea Boom

= Tradescantia pallida =

Species of flowering plant

Tradescantia pallida is a species of spiderwort native to the Gulf Coast region of eastern Mexico. It is a perennial herbaceous species with a trailing habit. The cultivar T. pallida 'Purpurea', commonly called purple heart or purple queen or wandering Jew, is widely grown as a houseplant, outdoor container plant, or a garden groundcover. The species has been proven useful in indicating and removing air and soil pollutants and has also been used in food technology.

== Taxonomy ==
T. pallida is a species of spiderwort in the family Commelinaceae. The type specimen was collected by Edward Palmer, one of the main US plant collectors of his time, in the Mexican state of Tamaulipas (possibly near Ciudad Victoria) in 1907. The species was described by Joseph Nelson Rose in 1911. He placed it in the genus Setcreasea. In 1975 David Hunt transferred the species to the genus Tradescantia. Hunt also treated Setcreasea purpurea as a cultivar of S. pallida. The latter names are still often used to refer to T. pallida. The specific epithet pallida means "pale", referring to the original color of the leaves.

The plant is known by several common names, including purple heart (probably in reference to the eponymous military medal) and purple wandering jew.

== Description ==
T. pallida is perennial and herbaceous. It has a rambling habit, with plants reaching about a 1 ft (30 cm) in height but spreading considerably wider: the stems may trail to 18 in (46 cm) or more. Wild specimens are gray-green-purplish with a washed out look.

Flower of T. pallida 'Purpurea'

The fleshy, hairy leaves are up to 7 in (180 mm) long, narrow-oblong, and v-shaped. and form a sheath around fleshy stems, which break off easily. On the ends of the stems the plants produce relatively inconspicuous flowers. The flowers are three-petaled as is typical for the Tradescantia genus. The flowering is most abundant from midsummer through fall and sporadic at other times of the year. The flowers are open only in the morning. The plants are evergreen, but in colder areas die back to the ground in winter and resprout from the roots in spring.

== Distribution and habitat ==
T. pallida is found along the coast of the Gulf of Mexico. Its native range extends from Tamaulipas to Yucatan. The species has been collected in a tropical deciduous forest, among roadside limestone rocks, and on limestone outcrops.

== Uses ==
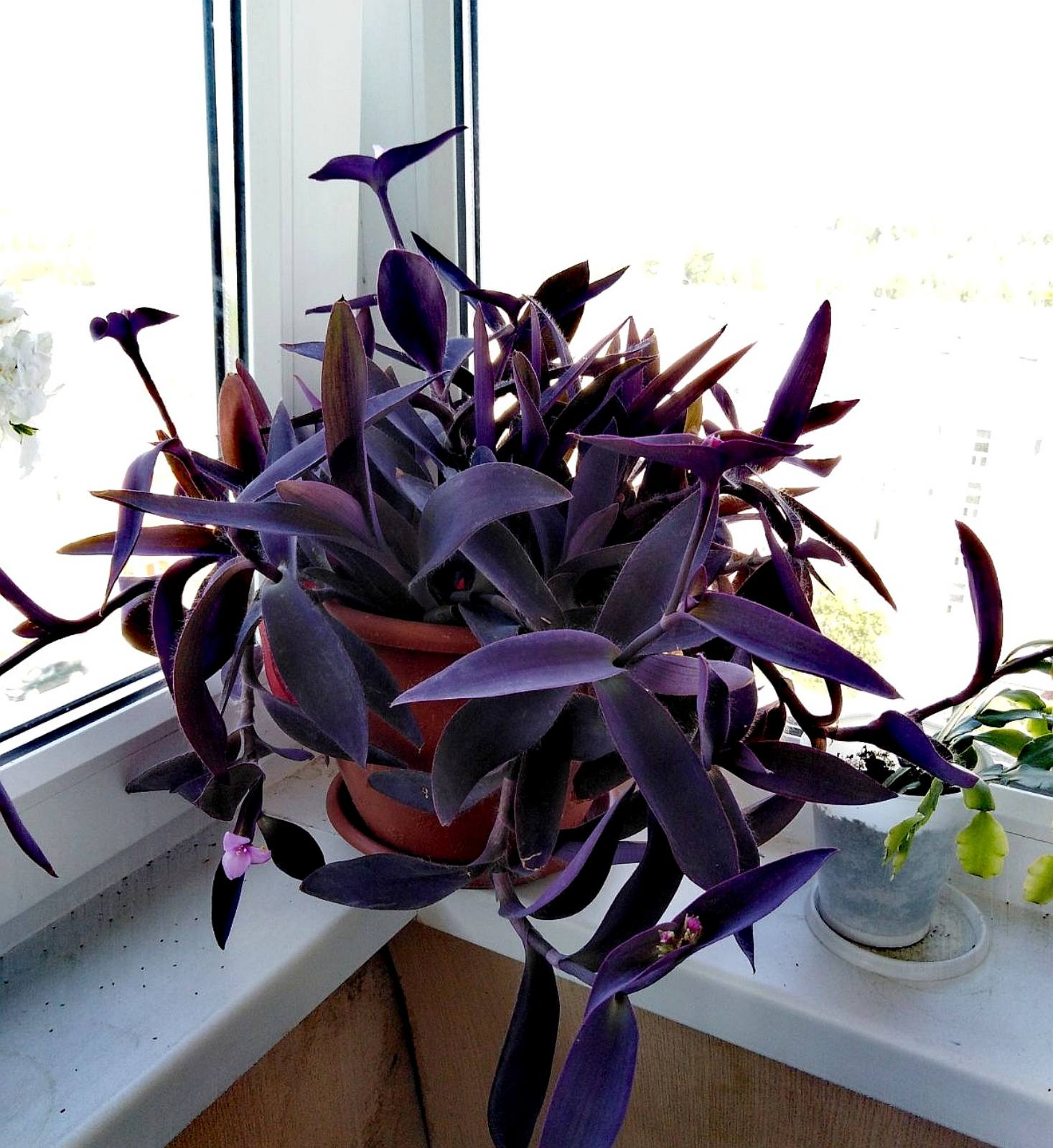
T. pallida 'Purpurea' as a houseplant

T. pallida is grown as an ornamental plant for its attractive foliage. Only the cultivar 'Purpurea', featuring purple-violet leaves and stems, is commercially grown. 'Purpurea' is sometimes sold under the name 'Purple Heart', and has gained the Royal Horticultural Society's Award of Garden Merit.

T. pallida is a popular groundcover plant in tropical and semi-tropical areas. In temperate climates it has traditionally been used as a houseplant but is increasingly being planted outdoors in containers or as a groundcover. It is also suitable for hanging baskets, border fronts, and rock gardens. The plant is hardy down to USDA zone 7. It may be grown in the shade but the most intense purple color is achieved in full sun. The plant is remarkable for easily tolerating both drought and frequent watering. It is generally not affected by pests or diseases; however, slugs and caterpillars may attack young shoots of outdoor specimens, while houseplants should be monitored for aphids and scale.

T. pallida has been proven useful for phytoremediation, biomonitoring, and genotoxicity assessment of environmental pollutants, especially heavy metals and metalloids from coal power plants. As a houseplant, T. pallida has been judged exceptionally effective at improving indoor air quality by filtering out volatile organic compounds, a class of common pollutants and respiratory irritants.

Because the plant contains anthocyanins, T. pallida leaves have been used as food colorants and food preservatives.
