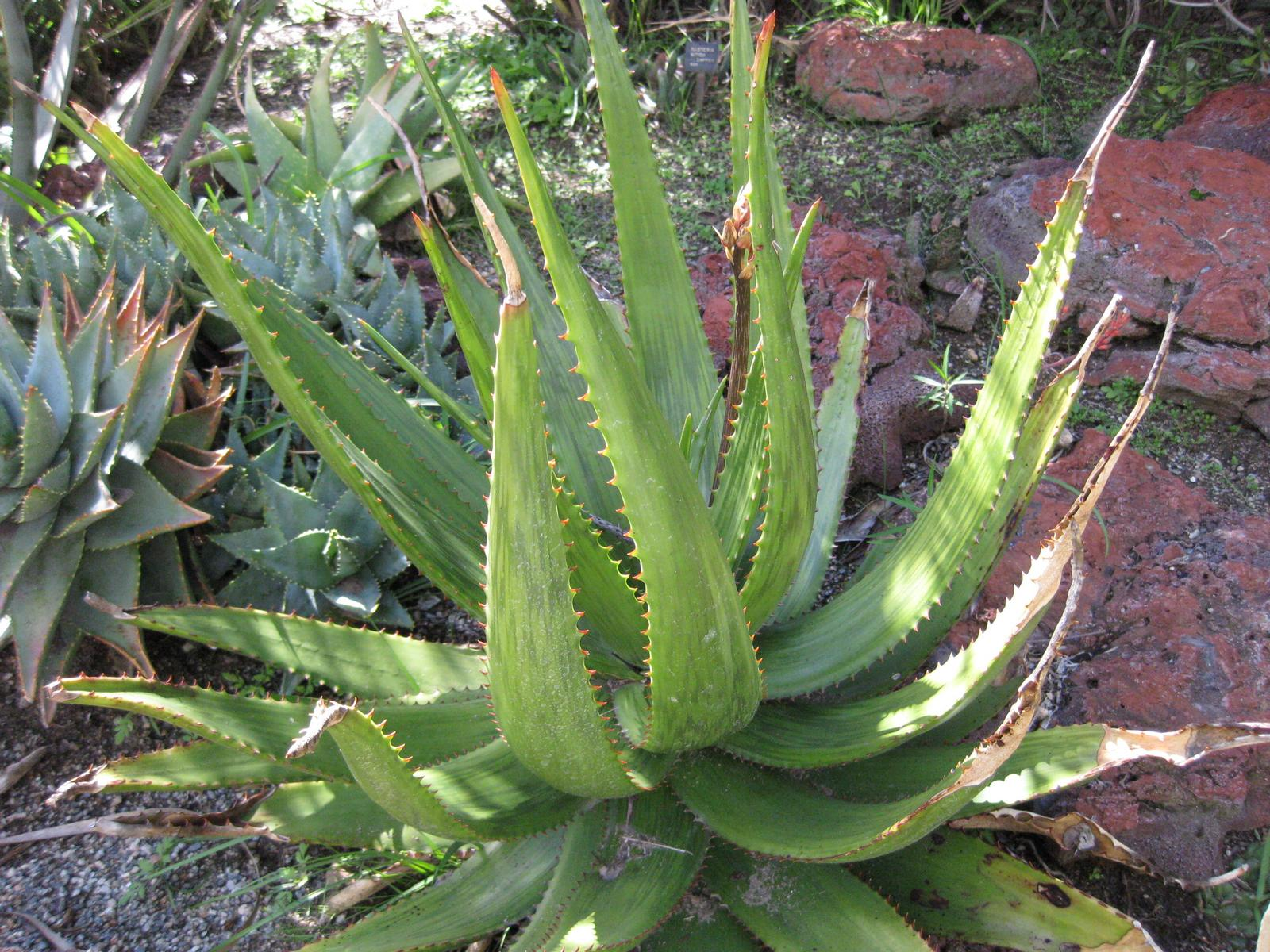

Conservation status
- Endangered (IUCN 3.1)
- CITES Appendix II (CITES)

Scientific classification
- Kingdom: Plantae
- Clade: Tracheophytes
- Clade: Angiosperms
- Clade: Monocots
- Order: Asparagales
- Family: Asphodelaceae
- Subfamily: Asphodeloideae
- Genus: Aloe
- Species: A. harlana

Binomial name
- Aloe harlana Reynolds

= Aloe harlana =

Species of succulent

Aloe harlana is a species of Aloe found in eastern Ethiopia. It was first described by Gilbert Reynolds in 1957.
