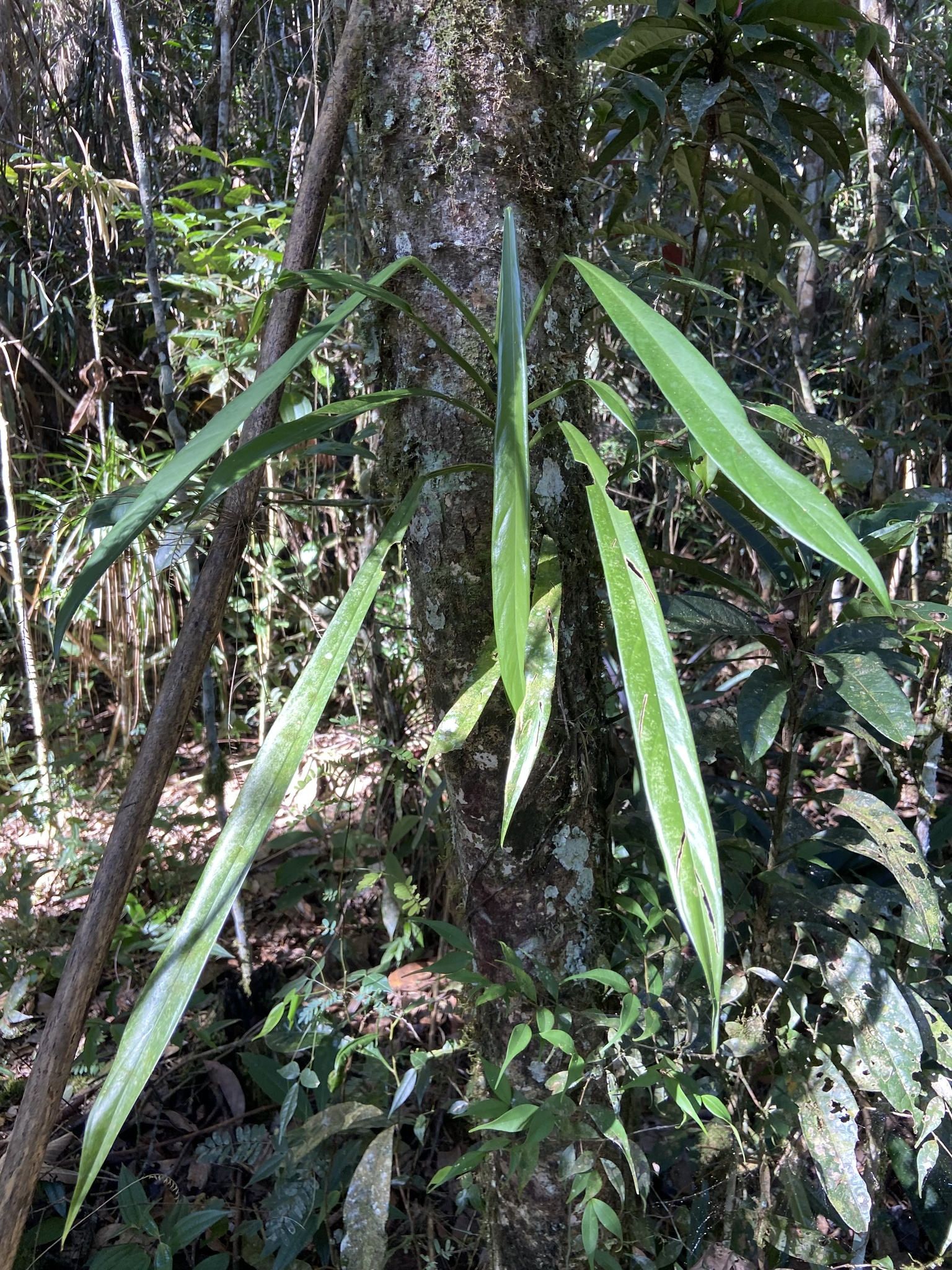

Scientific classification
- Kingdom: Plantae
- Clade: Tracheophytes
- Clade: Angiosperms
- Clade: Monocots
- Order: Alismatales
- Family: Araceae
- Genus: Philodendron
- Species: P. oblongum

Binomial name
- Philodendron oblongum (Vell.) Kunth

Synonyms
- Arum oblongum Vell.

= Philodendron oblongum =

Species of plant

Philodendron oblongum is a species of plant in the genus Philodendron native to eastern Brazil. First described as Arum oblongum by Vellozo in 1831, it was moved by Carl Sigismund Kunth to Philodendron. Like others in the genus, it grows in wet tropical biomes and is a hemiepiphyte.

== See also ==
- List of Philodendron species
