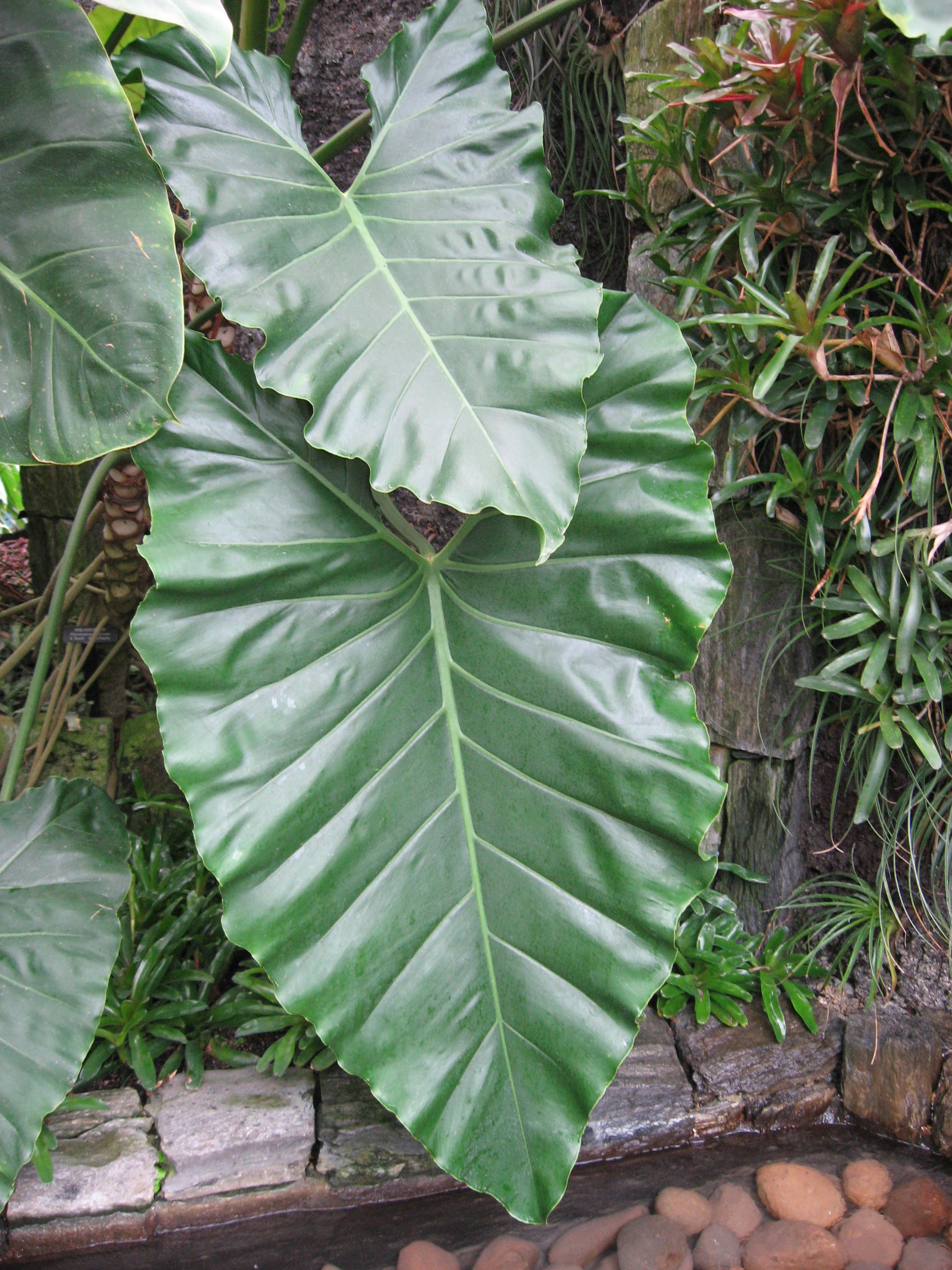

Scientific classification
- Kingdom: Plantae
- Clade: Tracheophytes
- Clade: Angiosperms
- Clade: Monocots
- Order: Alismatales
- Family: Araceae
- Genus: Philodendron
- Species: P. speciosum

Binomial name
- Philodendron speciosum Schott ex Endl.

Synonyms
- Meconostigma speciosum Schott, not validly publ.; Thaumatophyllum speciosum (Schott ex Endl.) Sakur., Calazans & Mayo

= Philodendron speciosum =

Species of flowering plant

Philodendron speciosum, synonym Thaumatophyllum speciosum, is a species of plant in the family Araceae, native to Brazil and Bolivia.
