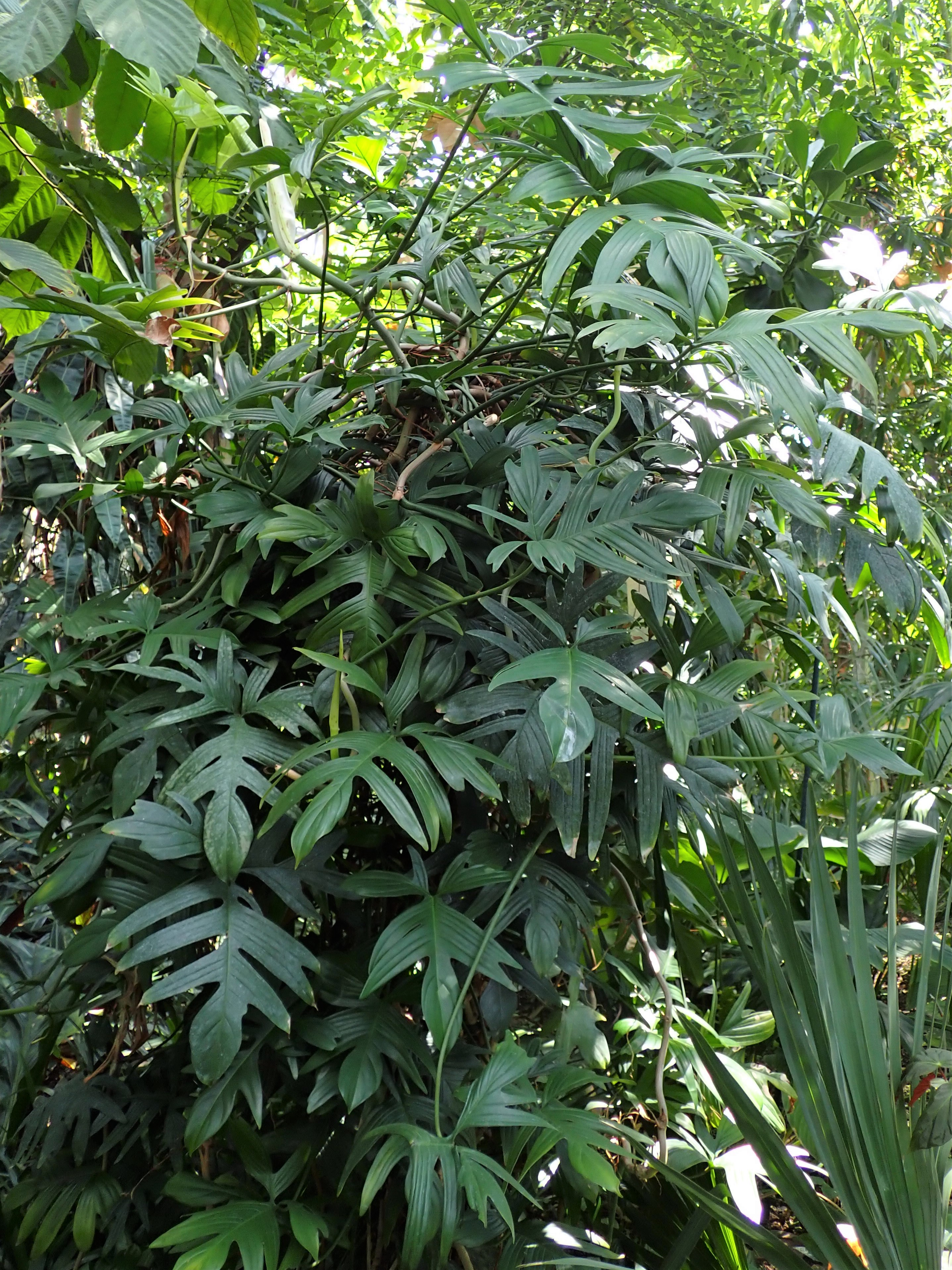
- Philodedron pedatum in the Berlin Botanical Garden and Botanical Museum

Scientific classification
- Kingdom: Plantae
- Clade: Tracheophytes
- Clade: Angiosperms
- Clade: Monocots
- Order: Alismatales
- Family: Araceae
- Genus: Philodendron
- Species: P. pedatum

Binomial name
- Philodendron pedatum (Hook.) Kunth

Synonyms
- Caladium pedatum Hook.; Dracontium laciniatum Vell.; Philodendron amazonicum Engl.; Philodendron duisbergii Epple ex G.S.Bunting; Philodendron laciniatum (Vell.) Engl.; Philodendron laciniatum var. palmatisectum Engl.; Philodendron laciniatum var. weddellianum Engl.; Philodendron laciniosum Schott; Philodendron pedatum var. weddelianum Engl.; Philodendron polypodioides A.M.E.Jonker & Jonker; Philodendron quercifolium Engl.; Philodendron quercifolium Engl.; Philodendron weddellianum Engl.

= Philodendron pedatum =

Species of plant

Philodendron pedatum is a species of plant in the genus Philodendron native to South America from Colombia to southeast Brazil. It grows in wet tropical forests and like many in the genus, has a climbing growth habit.

Commonly known as the oak leaf philodendron, its foliage is lobed and changes shape as it matures, becoming larger and increasing the number of lateral lobes. This species is also the source of a number of named varieties in cultivation, such as the cultivar 'Glad Hands', and also shares parentage with the related species Philodendron squamiferum over the hybrid Philodendron × 'Florida'.

== See also ==
- List of Philodendron species
