= Philodendron saxicola =

Scientific classification
- Kingdom: Plantae
- Clade: Tracheophytes
- Clade: Angiosperms
- Clade: Monocots
- Order: Alismatales
- Family: Araceae
- Genus: Philodendron
- Species: P. saxicola

Binomial name
- Philodendron saxicola K.Krause

Synonyms
- Thaumatophyllum saxicola (K.Krause) Sakur., Calazans & Mayo

Species of plant

Philodendron saxicola, the rock philodendron, is a species of flowering plant in the family Araceae. It is endemic to Bahia, Brazil. A lithophytic shrub, it is typically found in the seasonally dry tropical biome.
