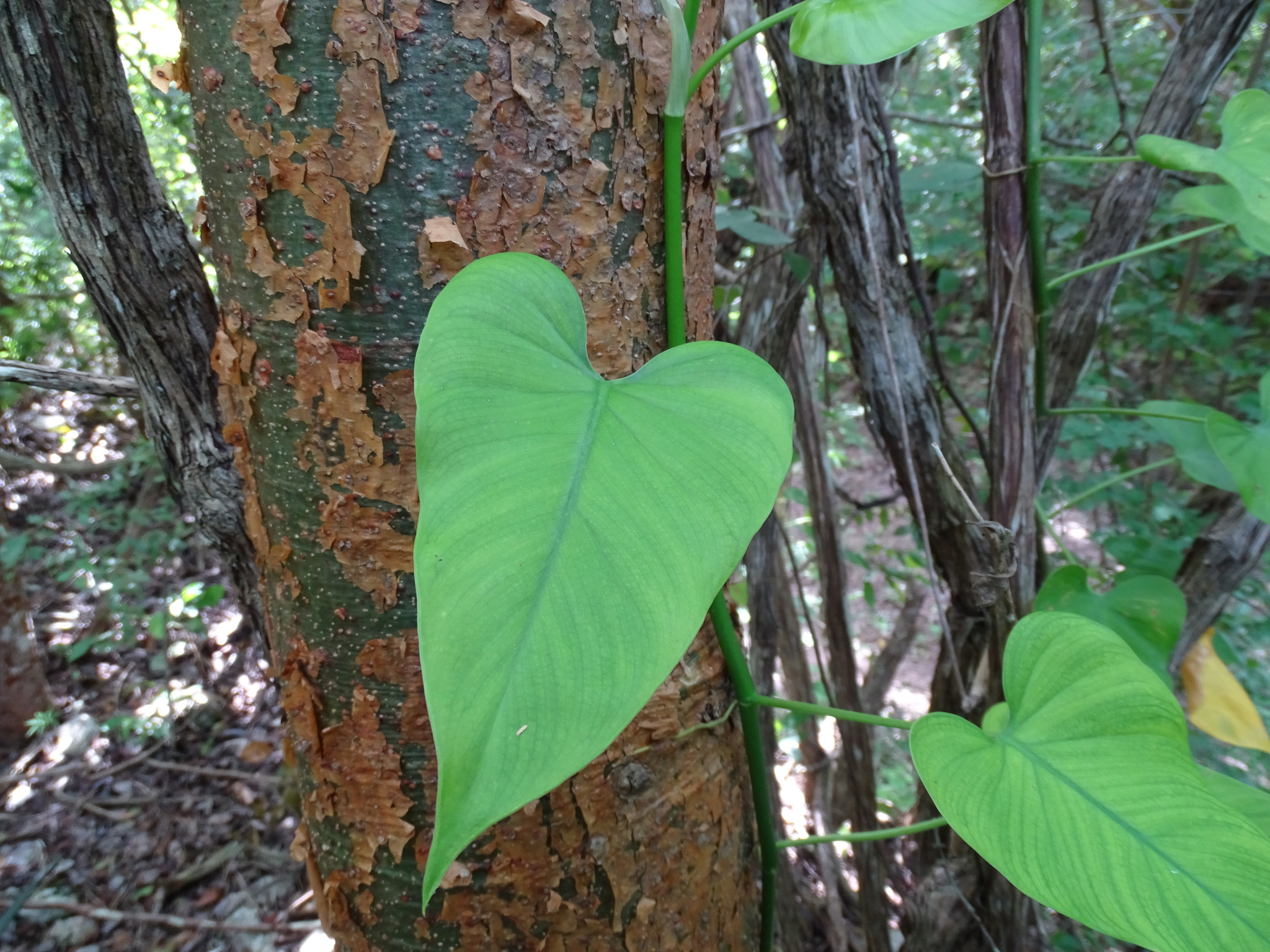
- Philodendron jacquinii

Scientific classification
- Kingdom: Plantae
- Clade: Tracheophytes
- Clade: Angiosperms
- Clade: Monocots
- Order: Alismatales
- Family: Araceae
- Genus: Philodendron
- Section: Philodendron sect. Baursia (Rchb. ex Schott) Engl.

= Philodendron sect. Baursia =

Group of flowering plants

Baursia is a section within the genus Philodendron that consists of 13 species of plants. Philodendron species that are members of this section are typically described as having very prominent lateral veins. They also have elongated oblong leaves with a few species that are exceptions to this rule. Members of this section are usually found within south-eastern South America and the upper Amazon basin. The type species for this section is Philodendron crassinervium. Additionally, philodendron within this section have plurilocular ovaries.

Philodendron in the section Baursia are often confused with those of the section Philopsammos since they both are characterized by having long elliptical leaves. The two can be distinguished however because philopsammos philodendron have bilocular ovaries.

== Species ==
The following species are recognised in the section Baursia:

- Philodendron applanatum G.M.Barroso
- Philodendron callosum K.Krause
- Philodendron crassinervium Lindl.
- Philodendron dunstervilleorum G.S.Bunting
- Philodendron edmundoi G.M.Barroso
- Philodendron ernestii Engl.
- Philodendron glanduliferum Matuda
- Philodendron hederaceum (Jacq.) Schott
- Philodendron insigne Schott
- Philodendron jacquinii Schott
- Philodendron linnaei Kunth
- Philodendron longilaminatum Schott
- Philodendron pulchrum G.M.Barroso
