= List of Aldama species =

List of plant species

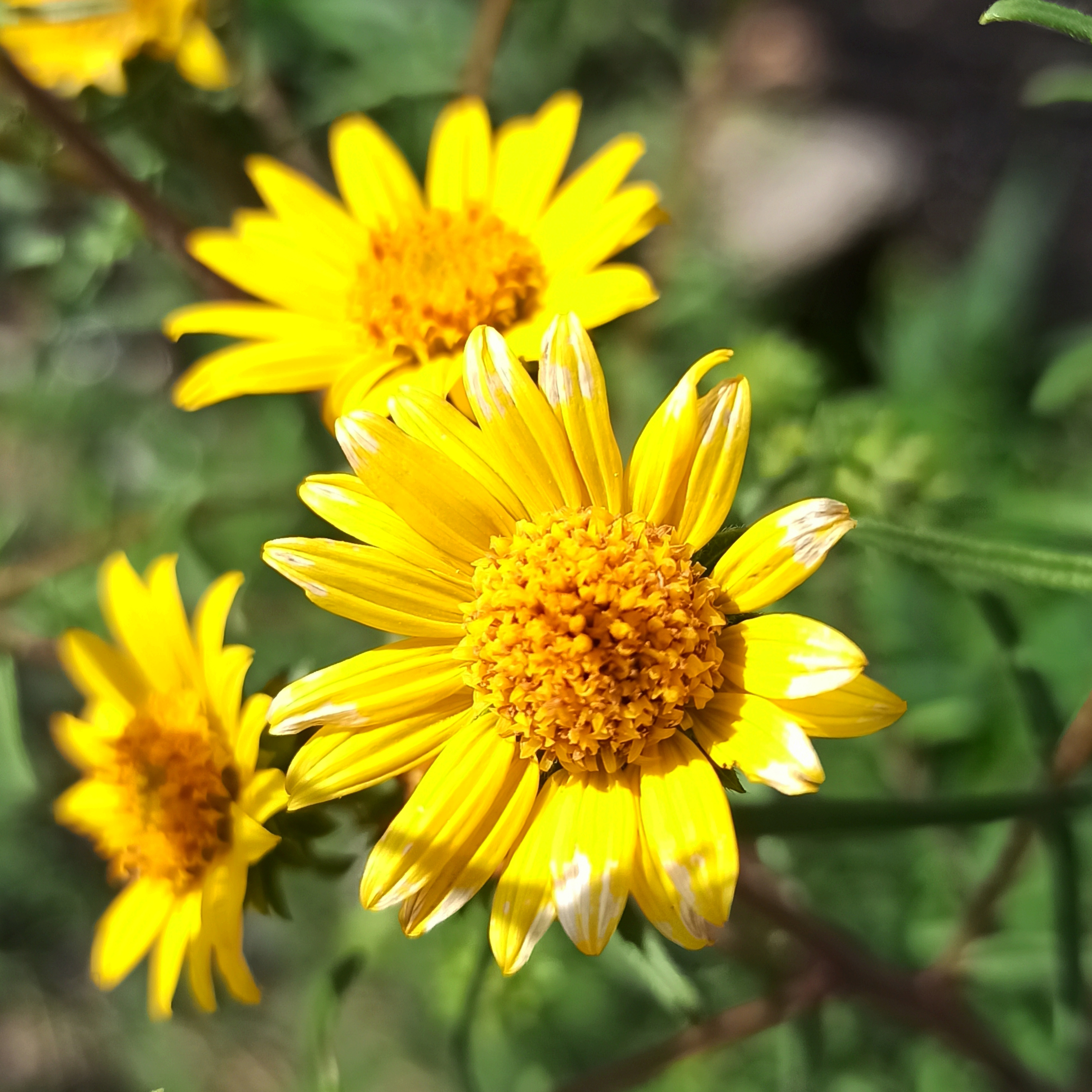
Aldama linearis from Guanajuato, México.

This is a list of the plant species in the genus Aldama. Many are former species of Viguiera (subtribe Helianthinae) that were transferred over after DNA analysis in 2011.

As of 10 October 2023, the Plants of the World Online lists up to 118 species, while World Flora Online lists about 115 species.

== A ==
- Aldama adenotricha (S.F.Blake) E.E.Schill. & Panero
- Aldama amphichlora (S.F.Blake) E.E.Schill. & Panero
- Aldama anchusifolia (DC.) E.E.Schill. & Panero
- Aldama angustifolia (Hook. & Arn.) E.E.Schill. & Panero
- Aldama angustissima (S.F.Blake) E.E.Schill. & Panero
- Aldama apiculata (S.F.Blake) E.E.Schill. & Panero
- Aldama arenaria (Baker) E.E.Schill. & Panero
- Aldama aspilioides (Baker) E.E.Schill. & Panero
- Aldama atacamensis (Phil.) E.E.Schill. & Panero
- Aldama australis (S.F.Blake) E.E.Schill. & Panero
- Aldama ayutlana (B.L.Turner) B.L.Turner

== B ==
- Aldama bakeriana (S.F.Blake) E.E.Schill. & Panero
- Aldama bishopii (H.Rob.) E.E.Schill. & Panero
- Aldama bracteata (Gardner) E.E.Schill. & Panero
- Aldama brandegeei (A.M.Carter) E.E.Schill. & Panero
- Aldama breviflosculosa (S.F.Blake) E.E.Schill. & Panero
- Aldama brittonii (Hochr.) E.E.Schill. & Panero
- Aldama buddlejiformis (DC.) E.E.Schill. & Panero

== C ==
- Aldama canescens (B.L.Rob.) E.E.Schill. & Panero
- Aldama congesta (Rose ex O.Hoffm.) E.E.Schill. & Panero
- Aldama coraniana (A.A.Sáenz) E.E.Schill. & Panero
- Aldama cordifolia (A.Gray) E.E.Schill. & Panero
- Aldama cornifolia (Kunth) E.E.Schill. & Panero
- Aldama corumbensis (Malme) Magenta & Pirani

== D ==
- Aldama densifolia (Baker) E.E.Schill. & Panero
- Aldama dentata La Llave
- Aldama dilloniorum (A.J.Moore & H.Rob.) E.E.Schill. & Panero
- Aldama discolor (Baker) E.E.Schill. & Panero

== E ==
- Aldama ellenbergii (Cuatrec.) E.E.Schill. & Panero
- Aldama emaciata (H.Rob. & A.J.Moore) E.E.Schill. & Panero
- Aldama ensifolia (Sch.Bip.) E.E.Schill. & Panero
- Aldama excelsa (Willd.) E.E.Schill. & Panero

== F ==
- Aldama fabrisii (A.A.Sáenz) E.E.Schill. & Panero
- Aldama filifolia (Sch.Bip. ex Baker) E.E.Schill. & Panero
- Aldama flava (Hemsl.) E.E.Schill. & Panero
- Aldama fruticosa (Brandegee) E.E.Schill. & Panero
- Aldama fusiformis (S.F.Blake) E.E.Schill. & Panero

== G ==
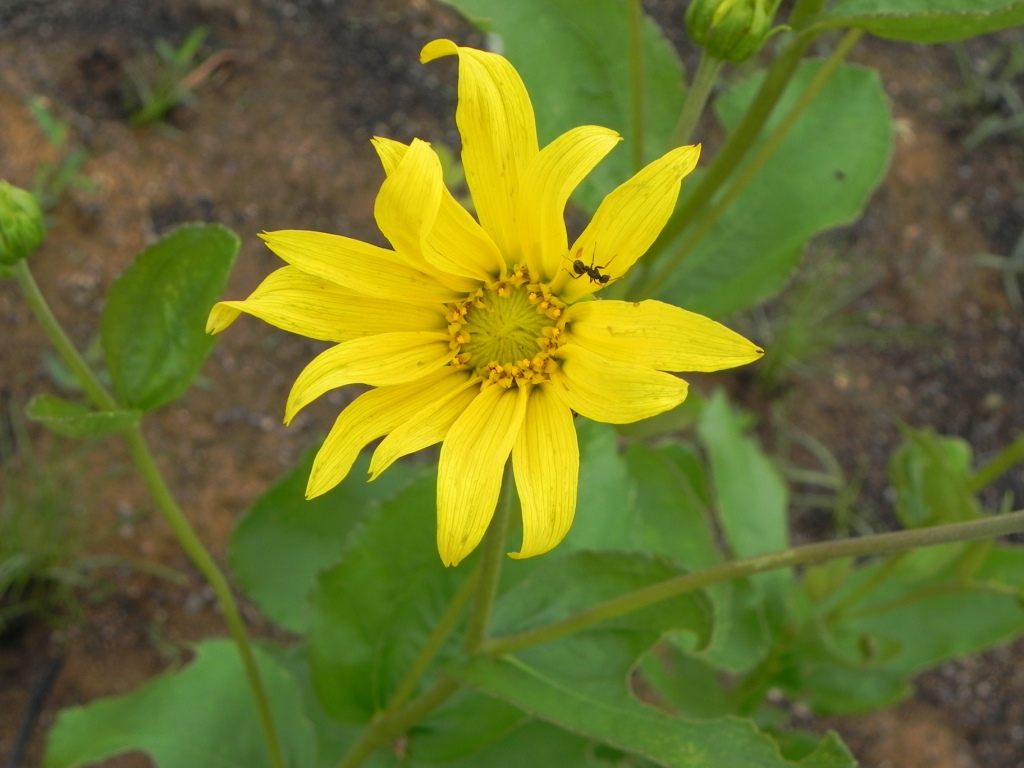
Aldama grandiflora from Distrito Federal, Brasil.

- Aldama gardneri (Baker) E.E.Schill. & Panero
- Aldama gentryi (B.L.Turner) E.E.Schill. & Panero
- Aldama ghiesbreghtii (Hemsl.) E.E.Schill. & Panero
- Aldama gilliesii (Hook. & Arn.) E.E.Schill. & Panero
- Aldama glomerata (Brandegee) E.E.Schill. & Panero
- Aldama goldmanii (Greenm.) E.E.Schill. & Panero
- Aldama goyasensis (H.Rob. & A.J.Moore) E.E.Schill. & Panero
- Aldama goyazii E.E.Schill. & Panero
- Aldama grahamii (McVaugh) E.E.Schill. & Panero
- Aldama grandiflora (Gardner) E.E.Schill. & Panero
- Aldama guaranitica (Chodat) E.E.Schill. & Panero

== H ==
- Aldama hatschbachii (H.Rob. & A.J.Moore) E.E.Schill. & Panero
- Aldama helianthoides (Rich.) E.E.Schill. & Panero
- Aldama hilairei (S.F.Blake) E.E.Schill. & Panero
- Aldama hispida (Kunth) E.E.Schill. & Panero
- Aldama huajicoria (B.L.Turner) B.L.Turner
- Aldama hypochlora (S.F.Blake) E.E.Schill. & Panero
- Aldama hypoleuca (S.F.Blake) E.E.Schill. & Panero

== I ==
- Aldama iltisii (B.L.Turner) B.L.Turner
- Aldama incana (Pers.) E.E.Schill. & Panero

== K ==
- Aldama kingii (H.Rob.) E.E.Schill. & Panero
- Aldama knobiana (Mondin & Magenta) E.E.Schill. & Panero
- Aldama kunthiana (Gardner) E.E.Schill. & Panero

== L ==
- Aldama lanceolata (Britton) E.E.Schill. & Panero
- Aldama latibracteata (Hemsl.) E.E.Schill. & Panero
- Aldama laxicymosa (H.Rob. & A.J.Moore) E.E.Schill. & Panero
- Aldama linearifolia (Chodat) E.E.Schill. & Panero
- Aldama linearis (Cav.) E.E.Schill. & Panero

== M ==
- Aldama macbridei (S.F.Blake) E.E.Schill. & Panero
- Aldama macropoda (S.F.Blake) E.E.Schill. & Panero
- Aldama macrorhiza (Baker) E.E.Schill. & Panero
- Aldama media (S.F.Blake) E.E.Schill. & Panero
- Aldama megapotamica (Malme) Magenta & Pirani
- Aldama meridionalis (Magenta) E.E.Schill. & Panero
- Aldama mesoamericana N.A.Harriman
- Aldama michoacana (B.L.Turner & F.G.Davies) E.E.Schill. & Panero
- Aldama misionensis (A.A.Sáenz) S.E.Freire
- Aldama mollis (Griseb.) E.E.Schill. & Panero
- Aldama montana (Rose) E.E.Schill. & Panero
- Aldama morelensis (S.F.Blake) E.E.Schill. & Panero

== N ==
- Aldama nervosa (Gardner) E.E.Schill. & Panero
- Aldama nesomii (B.L.Turner) E.E.Schill. & Panero
- Aldama nudibasillaris (S.F.Blake) E.E.Schill. & Panero
- Aldama nudicaulis (Baker) E.E.Schill. & Panero

== O ==
- Aldama oblongifolia (Gardner) E.E.Schill. & Panero

== P ==
- Aldama pachycephala (DC.) E.E.Schill. & Panero
- Aldama palmeri (A.Gray) E.E.Schill. & Panero
- Aldama paranensis (Malme) Magenta & Pirani
- Aldama parkinsonii (Hemsl.) E.E.Schill. & Panero
- Aldama perennans (B.L.Turner & F.G.Davies) E.E.Schill. & Panero
- Aldama peruviana (A.Gray) E.E.Schill. & Panero
- Aldama phenax (S.F.Blake) E.E.Schill. & Panero
- Aldama pilicaulis (S.F.Blake) E.E.Schill. & Panero
- Aldama pilosa (Baker) E.E.Schill. & Panero
- Aldama pringlei (B.L.Rob. & Greenm.) E.E.Schill. & Panero
- Aldama purisimae (Brandegee) E.E.Schill. & Panero

== R ==
- Aldama retroflexa (S.F.Blake) E.E.Schill. & Panero
- Aldama revoluta (Meyen) E.E.Schill. & Panero
- Aldama robusta (Gardner) E.E.Schill. & Panero
- Aldama rojasii (S.F.Blake) E.E.Schill. & Panero
- Aldama rubra (Magenta & Pirani) E.E.Schill. & Panero

== S ==
- Aldama salicifolia (Hassl.) E.E.Schill. & Panero
- Aldama santacatarinensis (H.Rob. & A.J.Moore) E.E.Schill. & Panero
- Aldama seemannii (Sch.Bip.) E.E.Schill. & Panero
- Aldama sodiroi (Hieron.) E.E.Schill. & Panero
- Aldama speciosa (Hassl.) E.E.Schill. & Panero
- Aldama squalida (S.Moore) E.E.Schill. & Panero
- Aldama squarrosa (Sch.Bip.) E.E.Schill. & Panero
- Aldama subcanescens (S.F.Blake) E.E.Schill. & Panero
- Aldama subdentata (S.F.Blake) E.E.Schill. & Panero
- Aldama subtruncata (H.Rob. & A.J.Moore) E.E.Schill. & Panero

== T ==
- Aldama tenuifolia (Gardner) E.E.Schill. & Panero
- Aldama torresii (B.L.Turner) E.E.Schill. & Panero
- Aldama trichophylla (Dusén) Magenta
- Aldama truxillensis (Kunth) E.E.Schill. & Panero
- Aldama tuberculata (S.F.Blake) E.E.Schill. & Panero
- Aldama tuberosa (Griseb.) E.E.Schill. & Panero
- Aldama tukumanensis (Hook. & Arn.) E.E.Schill. & Panero

== V ==
- Aldama veredensis (Magenta & Pirani) E.E.Schill. & Panero
- Aldama vernonioides (Baker) E.E.Schill. & Panero

== W ==
- Aldama weddellii (Sch.Bip. ex S.F.Blake) E.E.Schill. & Panero
