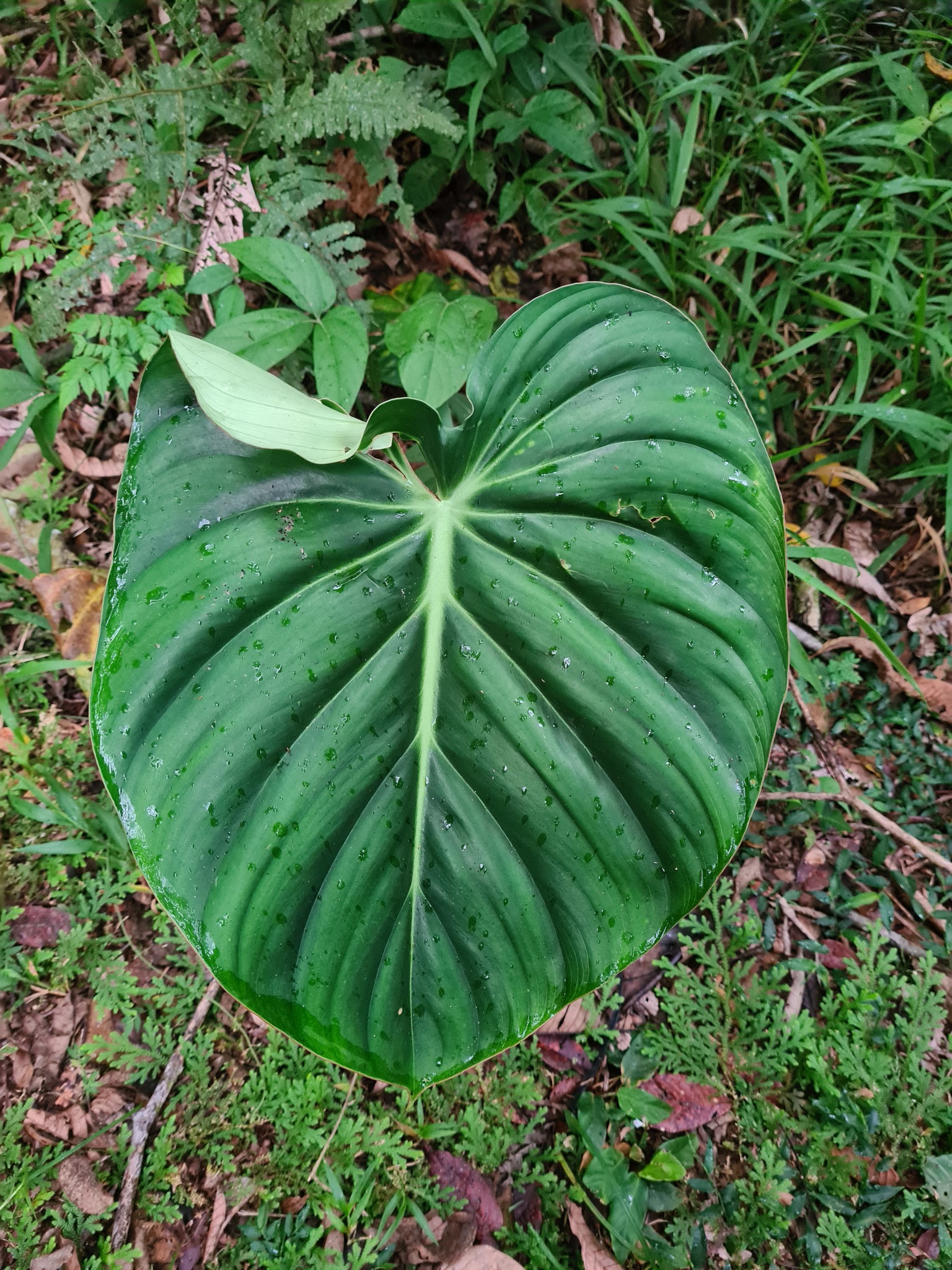

Scientific classification
- Kingdom: Plantae
- Clade: Tracheophytes
- Clade: Angiosperms
- Clade: Monocots
- Order: Alismatales
- Family: Araceae
- Genus: Philodendron
- Species: P. pastazanum

Binomial name
- Philodendron pastazanum K.Krause

= Philodendron pastazanum =

Species of plant

Philodendron pastazanum is a species of flowering plant in the family Araceae. It is native to Ecuador and Peru. It has cordate leaves, somewhat similar to Philodendron mamei and Philodendron sodiroi, but with deep green foliage and light venation.

== See also ==
- List of Philodendron species
