= Pitcairnia palmoides =

Scientific classification
- Kingdom: Plantae
- Clade: Embryophytes
- Clade: Tracheophytes
- Clade: Spermatophytes
- Clade: Angiosperms
- Clade: Monocots
- Clade: Commelinids
- Order: Poales
- Family: Bromeliaceae
- Genus: Pitcairnia
- Species: P. palmoides

Binomial name
- Pitcairnia palmoides Mez & Sodiro

Synonyms
- Heterotypic Synonyms: Pitcairnia dracaenoides H.Luther; Pitcairnia volubilis L.B.Sm.

Species of flowering plant

Pitcairnia palmoides is a species of flowering plant in the family Bromeliaceae. This species is native to Ecuador.
