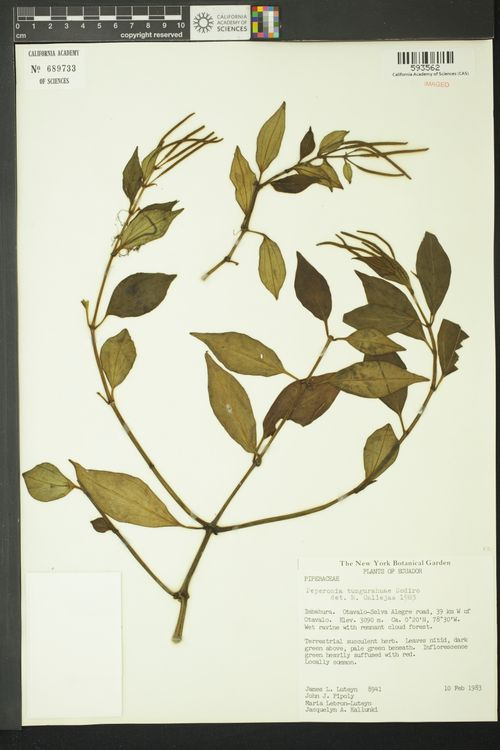

Scientific classification
- Kingdom: Plantae
- Clade: Tracheophytes
- Clade: Angiosperms
- Clade: Magnoliids
- Order: Piperales
- Family: Piperaceae
- Genus: Peperomia
- Species: P. tungurahuae

Binomial name
- Peperomia tungurahuae Sodiro

= Peperomia tungurahuae =

Species of epiphyte

Peperomia tungurahuae is a species of epiphyte from the genus Peperomia. It was first described by Luis Sodiro and published in the book "Contribuciones al conocimiento de la Flora Ecuatoriana . . . Monografia i. Piperaceas Ecuatorianas 1: Nuev. Adicion. 6. 1900". The species name came from Tungurahua, where first specimens of this species were collected.

== Distribution ==
It is endemic to Ecuador and Colombia. The first specimens were found at an altitude of 2600 meters in Tungurahua.
