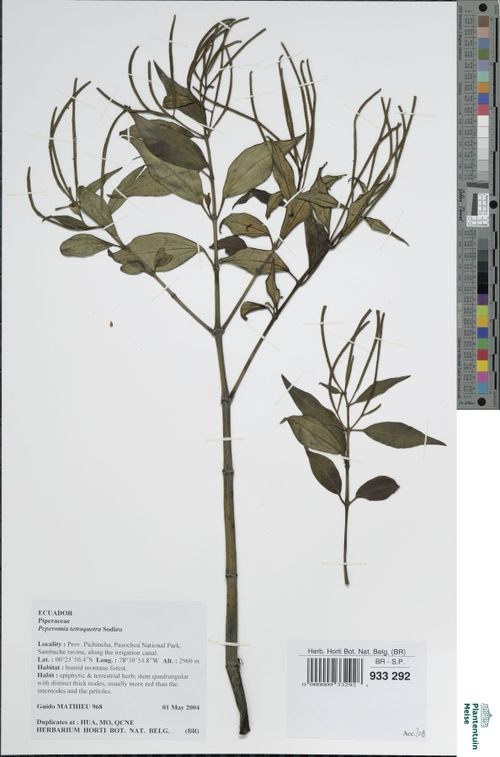

Scientific classification
- Kingdom: Plantae
- Clade: Tracheophytes
- Clade: Angiosperms
- Clade: Magnoliids
- Order: Piperales
- Family: Piperaceae
- Genus: Peperomia
- Species: P. tetraquetra

Binomial name
- Peperomia tetraquetra Sodiro

Synonyms
- Peperomia larana Yunck.

= Peperomia tetraquetra =

Species of hemiepiphytic subshrub

Peperomia tetraquetra is a species of hemiepiphytic subshrub from the genus Peperomia. It was first described by Luis Sodiro and published in the book "Contribuciones al conocimiento de la Flora Ecuatoriana . . . Monografia i. Piperaceas Ecuatorianas 1: 175. 1900 ". It primarily grows on wet tropical biomes.

== Distribution ==
It is endemic to Southern America. First specimens where found at an altitude of 2787.5 meters in Lara

- Colombia
  - Antioquia
- Ecuador
  - Tachira
  - Mérida
  - Lara
- Venezuela
  - Pichincha
  - Carchi
