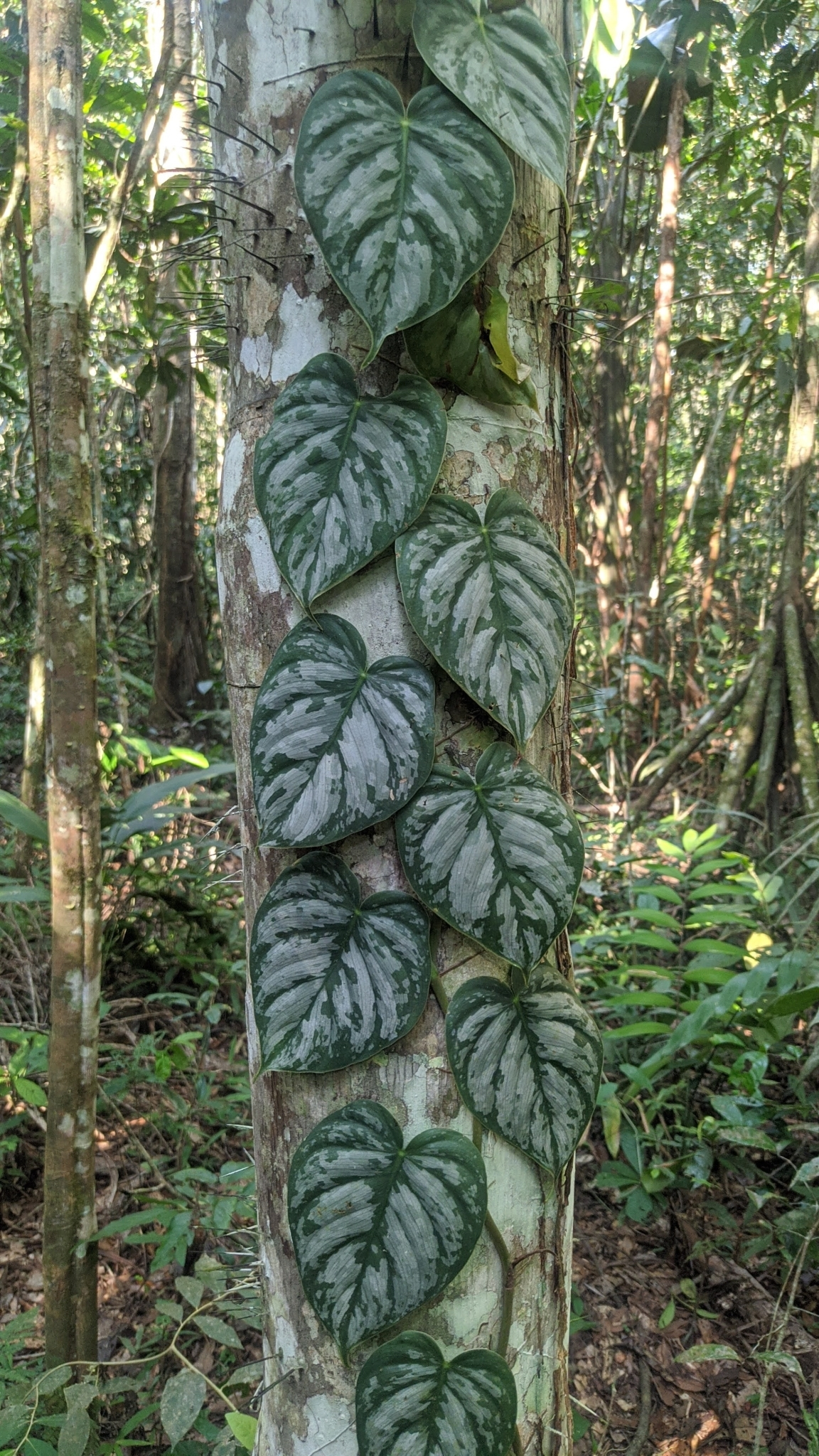
- Philodendron brandtianum growing in habitat in Colombia

Scientific classification
- Kingdom: Plantae
- Clade: Tracheophytes
- Clade: Angiosperms
- Clade: Monocots
- Order: Alismatales
- Family: Araceae
- Genus: Philodendron
- Species: P. brandtianum

Binomial name
- Philodendron brandtianum K.Krause

= Philodendron brandtianum =

Species of plant

Philodendron brandtianum is a species of plant in the genus Philodendron. A climbing epiphyte that closely hugs its host tree, it is native to southern Colombia, northern Brazil, and Bolivia in seasonally dry areas. It is also grown in temperate regions as a house plant, where it is best known for the heavy silver variegation on its juvenile leaves. It is sometimes confused for Philodendron hederaceum and Philodendron variifolium.

== See also ==
- List of Philodendron species
