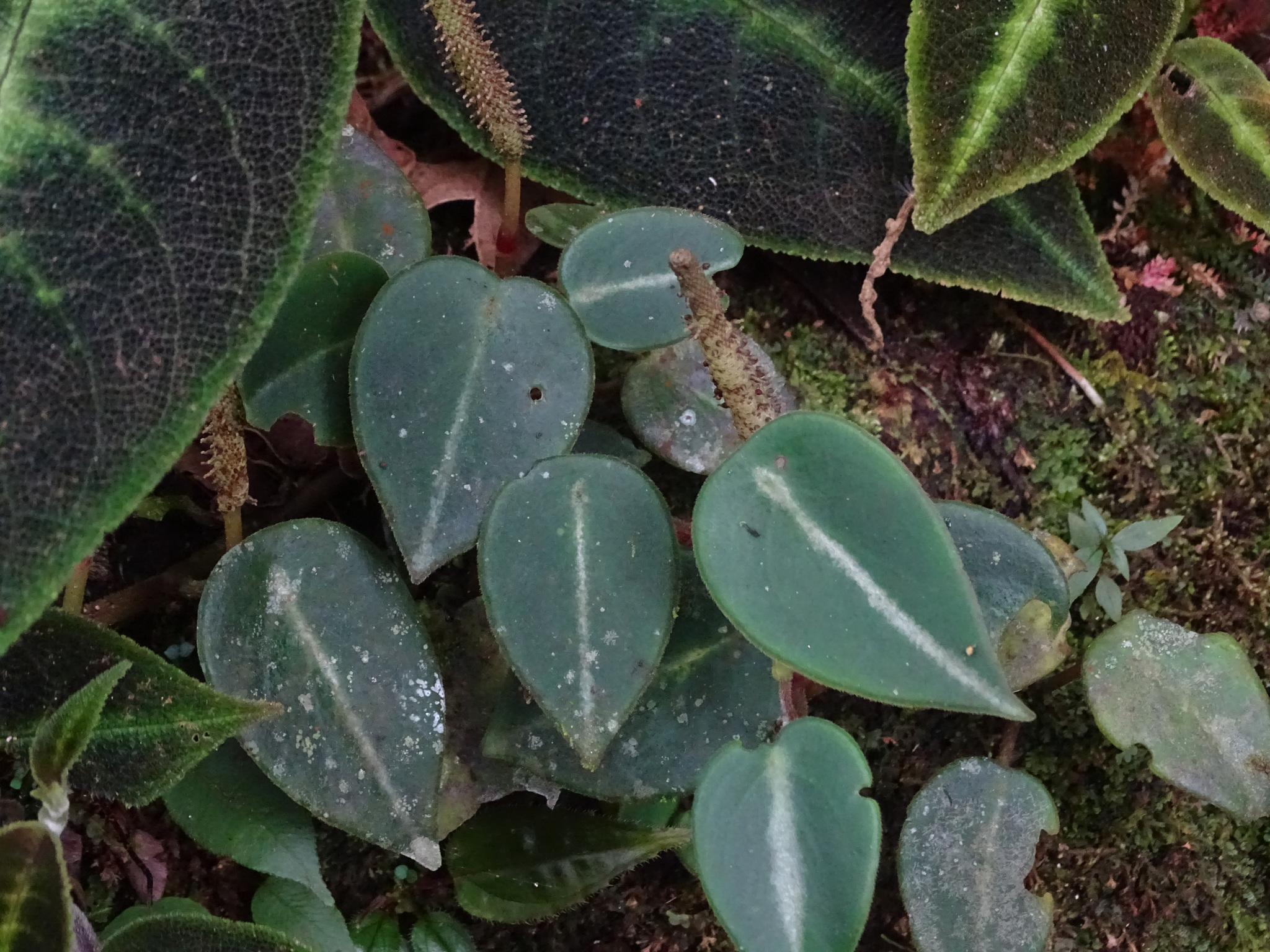
- P. eburnea growing in Colombia

Scientific classification
- Kingdom: Plantae
- Clade: Tracheophytes
- Clade: Angiosperms
- Clade: Magnoliids
- Order: Piperales
- Family: Piperaceae
- Genus: Peperomia
- Species: P. eburnea

Binomial name
- Peperomia eburnea Linden

Synonyms
- Peperomia eburnea Sodiro

= Peperomia eburnea =

Species of plant

Peperomia eburnea is a species of flowering plant in the family Piperaceae native to Colombia and Ecuador. It has a creeping or trailing growth habit, and grows in wet tropical biomes. Its foliage is green, and often has a single white stripe, along with red spotted backs of the leaves. Sodiro, who collected the type specimen for this species, described the red-mottled variant as maculata, but this variety is not scientifically accepted.
