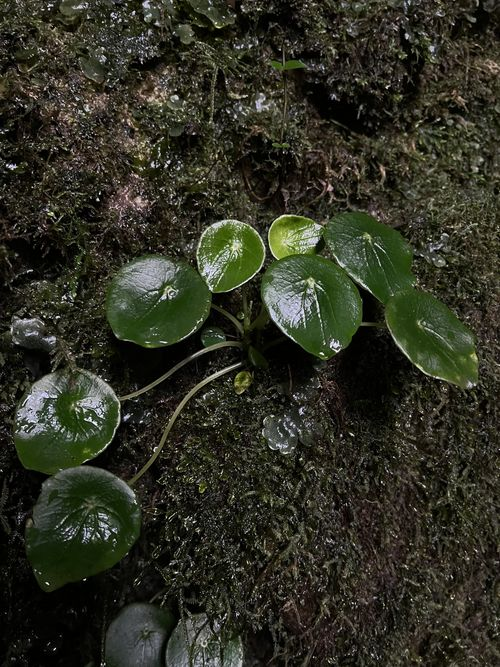

Scientific classification
- Kingdom: Plantae
- Clade: Tracheophytes
- Clade: Angiosperms
- Clade: Magnoliids
- Order: Piperales
- Family: Piperaceae
- Genus: Peperomia
- Species: P. tropaeoloides

Binomial name
- Peperomia tropaeoloides Sodiro

Synonyms
- Peperomia gazauntana Yunck.; Peperomia villibacca Yunck.

= Peperomia tropaeoloides =

Species of flowering plant

Peperomia tropaeoloides or Peperomia tropeoloides is a species of flowering plant in the genus Peperomia found in Colombia & Ecuador. It primarily grows on wet tropical biomes. Its conservation status is Not Threatened.

== Description ==
The first specimens where collected in Napo, Ecuador.

Peperomia tropaeoloides has leaves that are glabrous. The stem is fleshy, ascending and radiating. The leaves have a long petiole that alternates. The petioles have an enlarged base, subcylindrical, and elongated. The limbs are fleshy, ovate, and rounded at the bottom, convex above, and 7-nerved. The peduncles are oppositely foliated and the petioles are equal. The catkin peduncles are equal or shorter, cylindrical, and sparse. The bracts are club-shaped, disc-like at the tip, and distant from ovary (after anthesis). The filament is very thin and long. The ovary is short, stalked, subglobular, and the stigma is sessile. The berry is stalked and pubescent.

== Taxonomy and naming ==
It was described in 1901 by Luis Sodiro in Piperaceas Ecuatorianas, from specimens collected by Luis Sodiro himself.

== Distribution and habitat ==
It is found in Colombia & Ecuador. It is a herb and grows on wet tropical biomes. In Colombia, its elevation range is 2560 - 3250 meters.

== Conservation ==
This species is assessed as Not Threatened, in a preliminary report.
