= Burmeistera sodiroana =

Conservation status
- Least Concern (IUCN 3.1)

Scientific classification
- Kingdom: Plantae
- Clade: Tracheophytes
- Clade: Angiosperms
- Clade: Eudicots
- Clade: Asterids
- Order: Asterales
- Family: Campanulaceae
- Genus: Burmeistera
- Species: B. sodiroana

Binomial name
- Burmeistera sodiroana Zahlbr.

Synonyms
- Burmeistera leucocarpa Zahlbr. in Repert. Spec. Nov. Regni Veg. 13: 529 (1915); Burmeistera leucocarpa var. dentata E.Wimm. in H.G.A.Engler (ed.), Das Pflanzenreich, IV, 276b: 140 (1943)

Species of flowering plant

Burmeistera sodiroana is a species of plant in the family Campanulaceae. It is endemic to Ecuador. Its natural habitat is subtropical or tropical moist montane forests. It is threatened by habitat loss.

It was first published by an Austrian-Hungarian botanist Alexander Zahlbruckner in Repert. Spec. Nov. Regni Veg. 13: 534 in 1915.

The specific epithet of sodiroi refers to Luis Sodiro (1836–1909), who was an Italian Jesuit priest and a field botanist, who collected many plants in Ecuador.
