= Burmeistera formosa =

Conservation status
- Data Deficient (IUCN 3.1)

Scientific classification
- Kingdom: Plantae
- Clade: Tracheophytes
- Clade: Angiosperms
- Clade: Eudicots
- Clade: Asterids
- Order: Asterales
- Family: Campanulaceae
- Genus: Burmeistera
- Species: B. formosa

Binomial name
- Burmeistera formosa (E.Wimm.) Jeppesen

Species of flowering plant

Burmeistera formosa is a species of plant in the family Campanulaceae. It is endemic to Ecuador.
