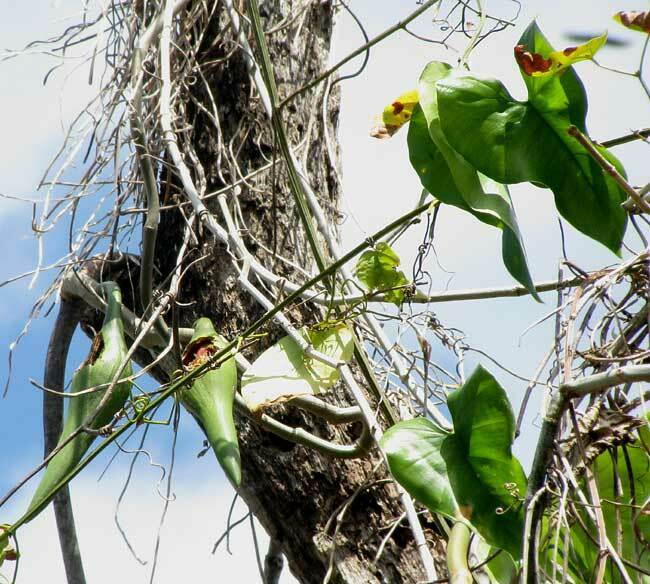
- Philodendron jacquinii with leaves and immature fruiting bodies damaged by a feeding animal.

Scientific classification
- Kingdom: Plantae
- Clade: Embryophytes
- Clade: Tracheophytes
- Clade: Angiosperms
- Clade: Monocots
- Order: Alismatales
- Family: Araceae
- Genus: Philodendron
- Species: P. jacquinii

Binomial name
- Philodendron jacquinii Schott

Synonyms
- Philodendron apocarpum Matuda; Philodendron deviatum Schott; Philodendron erlansonii I.M.Johnst.; Philodendron hoffmannii Schott; Philodendron lundellii Bartlett ex Lundell

= Philodendron jacquinii =

Species of plant

Philodendron jacquinii is a species of flowering plant belonging to the family Araceae, whose species often are known as aroids.

== Description ==
Philodendron jacquinii shares these features with most other species of the large genus Philodendron:

- Plants contain sap which is clear or resinous, not milky.
- Leaves are undivided into leaflets.
- Tiny, functionally male or female flowers are arranged on a fingerlike spadix enveloped by a leafy "spathe."

Features helping distinguish Philodendron jacquinii from similar Philodendron species include these:

- Its stems grow loosely on tree trunks and low shrubs, sometimes hanging, and are finely and uniformly rough, or asperous, to the touch.
- Leaf blades are up to 40 cm long and 28 cm wide (~16 x 11 inches), somewhat triangular to egg-shaped, with the base shallowly to deeply lobed, the backward-pointed lobes rounded on young plants and a bit sharp-pointed on older ones (cordate to sub-hastate); they fall off during the dry season.
- Petioles up to 46 cm long (~18 inches) in cross-section are round to slightly flattened, and spongy in texture.
- The fingerlike spadix enveloped by its spathe appears singly in leaf axils, on peduncles up to 12 cm long (~4 3/4 inches); the spadix is up to 12.5 cm long (~5 inches).
- The spathe enveloping the spadix is red to purplish inside, inflated, and splits open when the fruits are mature.
- Mature pistils, are prolonged at their tops.
- Ripe fruits are red-orange.

== Distribution ==
Philodendron jacquinii is native to southern Mexico and Cuba through Central America and in South America from Colombia to French Guiana.

== Habitat ==
In Costa Rica it occurs in dry to rarely wet forests from sea level up to 1300 meters in elevation. In Mexico's Gulf of Mexico coastal lowland in Veracruz state, it is described as occurring in tropical evergreen and semi-deciduous forests. Also in Mexico, Philodendron jacquinii is listed among species occurring on beaches and among coastal dunes of Veracruz state.

== Conservation status ==
Frequently literature describes Philodendron jacquinii as uncommon or rare where it occurs. In Veracruz state, Mexico, the species is reported as endangered.

== Human uses ==
=== As an ornamental ===
Philodendron jacquinii often is sold as a potted houseplant. Young plants are praised for their glossy, green, heart-shaped leaves which elongate as they mature. Older plants need a trellis or growing pole. Plants thrive in well drained potting soil in bright or indirect light. On Instagram, houseplant-grower user "philo.fix" in Michigan, USA reported that "Philodendron jacquinii is a weedy beast, give it some water and it goes crazy!"

In general, Philodendron species are toxic though it is unclear if this applies to all species.

=== Traditional uses ===
In Mexico's Yucatan Peninsula, Philodendron jacquinii is reported as used for magic in a religious context; also it is said that the latex is toxic.

== Taxonomy ==
The taxa Philodendron jacquinii and the similar Philodendron hederaceum have long been confused nomenclaturally. The confusion began when, in 1763, Jacquin published a plate of a drawing labeled P. hederaceum, but which actually showed P. jacquinii. This error was perpetuated when several authors, including Kunth (1841), Engler (1899), Krause (1913), Dugand (1945), and Bunting (1963, 1995), continued labeling as P. hederaceum plants that actually were P. jacquinii, basing their concepts of P. hederaceum on Jacquin's 1763 erroneous publication.

=== Phylogeny ===
Molecular phylogenetic analysis strongly supports a clade to which Philodendron jacquinii belongs, and whose members mainly are widely distributed vines estimated to have originated in the Middle Miocene, in South America. During the Middle Miocene, between about 16–11.6 million years ago, a sharp drop in global temperatures took place, an event known as the Middle Miocene Climatic Transition. It is hypothesized that distant ancestors of Philodendron jacquinii inhabited dense rainforests, but underwent a habitat shift before dispersing northward into seasonally dry tropical forests of the Caribbean area.

=== Etymology ===
The genus name Philodendron is a New Latin construct derived from the Greek word philódendros, meaning "fond of trees," in reference to its climbing habit.

The species name jacquinii honors Nikolaus Joseph von Jacquin, who collected and named numerous new species in the West Indies Colombia and Venezuela, among them some aroids.
