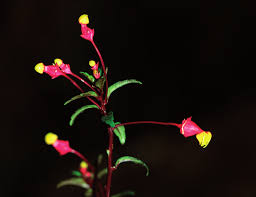
- Burmeistera minutiflora

Scientific classification
- Kingdom: Plantae
- Clade: Tracheophytes
- Clade: Angiosperms
- Clade: Eudicots
- Clade: Asterids
- Order: Asterales
- Family: Campanulaceae
- Subfamily: Lobelioideae
- Genus: Burmeistera; H.Karst. & Triana

Species
- Many, see text

= Burmeistera =

Genus of flowering plants

Burmeistera is a genus of flowering plants in the bellflower family, Campanulaceae. There are around 130 species distributed in Central and South America. This genus represents a rapid evolutionary radiation with species having diverged within only the last 2.6 million years.

These are herbs, shrubs, or lianas. Most have either green or yellow flowers with purple markings and inflated fruit pods.

The flowers of these plants are pollinated by bats, except for Burmeistera rubrosepala, which is pollinated by hummingbirds. Bats such as Anoura geoffroyi and Anoura caudifer visit the flowers for the nectar.

Species include:

- Burmeistera anderssonii
- Burmeistera asplundii
- Burmeistera auriculata
- Burmeistera brachyandra
- Burmeistera crispiloba
- Burmeistera cuyujensis
- Burmeistera cyclostigmata
- Burmeistera cylindrocarpa
- Burmeistera domingensis
- Burmeistera formosa
- Burmeistera holm-nielsenii
- Burmeistera huacamayensis
- Burmeistera ignimontis
- Burmeistera loejtnantii
- Burmeistera microphylla
- Burmeistera oblongifolia
- Burmeistera oyacachensis
- Burmeistera parviflora
- Burmeistera racemiflora
- Burmeistera refracta
- Burmeistera resupinata
- Burmeistera rubrosepala
- Burmeistera sodiroana
- Burmeistera tenuiflora
- Burmeistera truncata
