= Burmeistera resupinata =

Conservation status
- Endangered (IUCN 3.1)

Scientific classification
- Kingdom: Plantae
- Clade: Tracheophytes
- Clade: Angiosperms
- Clade: Eudicots
- Clade: Asterids
- Order: Asterales
- Family: Campanulaceae
- Genus: Burmeistera
- Species: B. resupinata

Binomial name
- Burmeistera resupinata Zahlbr.

Species of flowering plant

Burmeistera resupinata is a species of flowering plant in the family Campanulaceae. It's endemic to Ecuador. Its natural habitat is subtropical or tropical moist montane forests.
