= Burmeistera crispiloba =

Conservation status
- Vulnerable (IUCN 3.1)

Scientific classification
- Kingdom: Plantae
- Clade: Tracheophytes
- Clade: Angiosperms
- Clade: Eudicots
- Clade: Asterids
- Order: Asterales
- Family: Campanulaceae
- Genus: Burmeistera
- Species: B. crispiloba

Binomial name
- Burmeistera crispiloba Zahlbr.

Species of flowering plant

Burmeistera crispiloba is a species of plant in the family Campanulaceae. It is endemic to Ecuador. Its natural habitats are subtropical or tropical moist lowland forests and subtropical or tropical moist montane forests. It is a threatened species vulnerable to becoming endangered, and has become so primarily due to habitat destruction.
