= Burmeistera brachyandra =

Conservation status
- Vulnerable (IUCN 3.1)

Scientific classification
- Kingdom: Plantae
- Clade: Tracheophytes
- Clade: Angiosperms
- Clade: Eudicots
- Clade: Asterids
- Order: Asterales
- Family: Campanulaceae
- Genus: Burmeistera
- Species: B. brachyandra

Binomial name
- Burmeistera brachyandra E.Wimm.

Species of flowering plant

Burmeistera brachyandra is a species of plant in the family Campanulaceae. It is endemic to Ecuador. Its natural habitats are subtropical or tropical moist lowland forests and subtropical or tropical moist montane forests.
