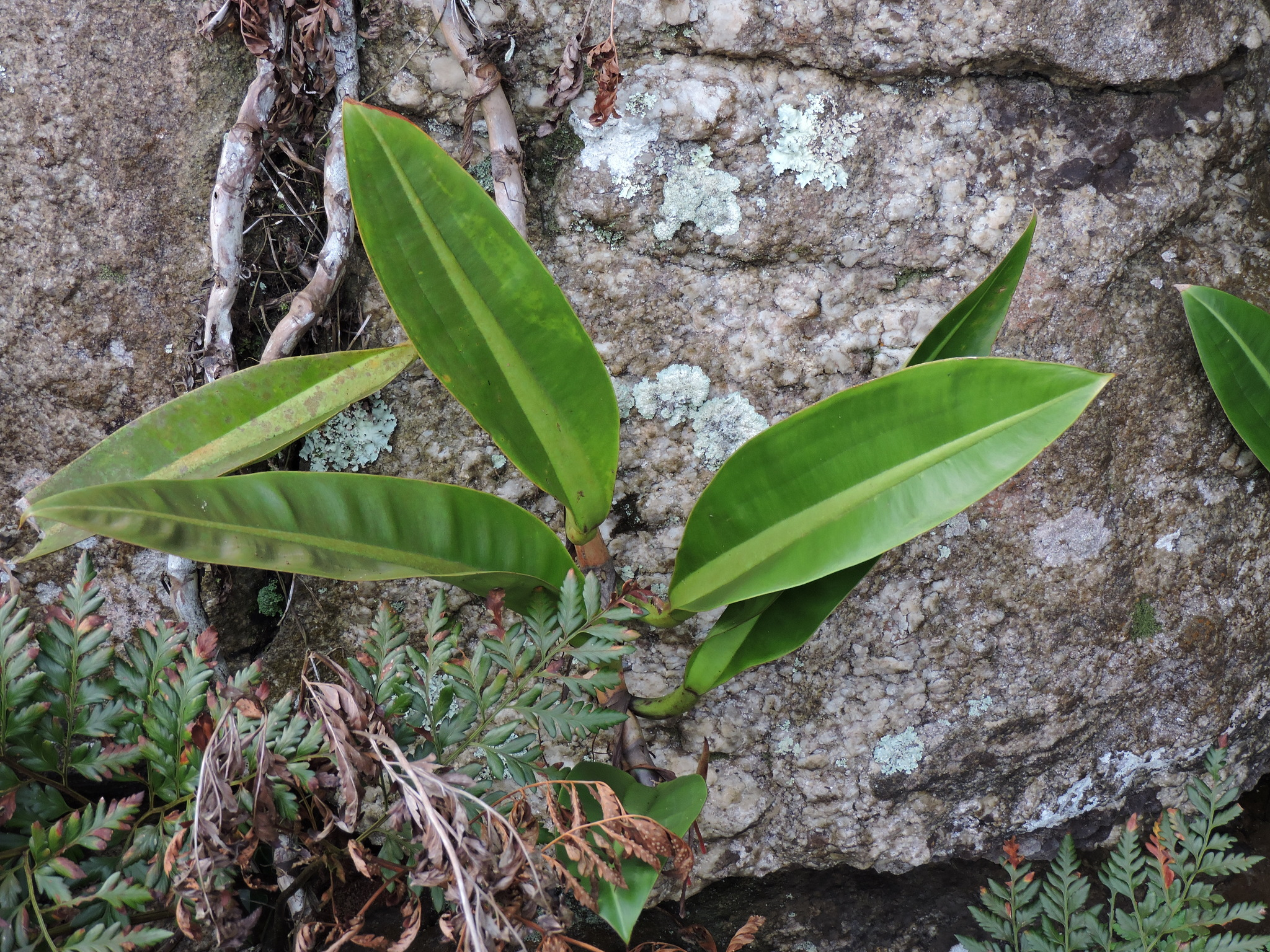
- Philodendron crassinervium growing in the wild in São Paulo state

Scientific classification
- Kingdom: Plantae
- Clade: Tracheophytes
- Clade: Angiosperms
- Clade: Monocots
- Order: Alismatales
- Family: Araceae
- Genus: Philodendron
- Section: Philodendron sect. Baursia
- Species: P. crassinervium

Binomial name
- Philodendron crassinervium Lindl.

= Philodendron crassinervium =

Species of flowering plant

Philodendron crassinervium is a species of plant in the genus Philodendron native to southeast Brazil.

It has lance-shaped leaves that point upwards and can grow almost a meter long with a width of about 10 centimetres (3.9 in). The leaves have a prominent midvein that is used to store water for periods of drought that occur during the dry season. Along the midvein, there are small red glands that produce a clear sap that results in a freckled-look on both sides of the leaves. The plant has a climbing growth habit. Its aerial roots of the plant are red when they first begin growing and later turn a dark brown with age.

The spadix of Philodendron crassinervium gets to about 20–25 cm long and is covered by a spathe that is white with shades of a dark red towards the bottom where the spadix emerges. The berries produced contain eight axile ovules in each ovary locule.

It is a part of the section Baursia. In fact, it is the type species of this section. There are some species that resemble Philodendron crassinervium, such as Philodendron longilaminatum and Philodendron edmundoi.

== See also ==
- List of Philodendron species

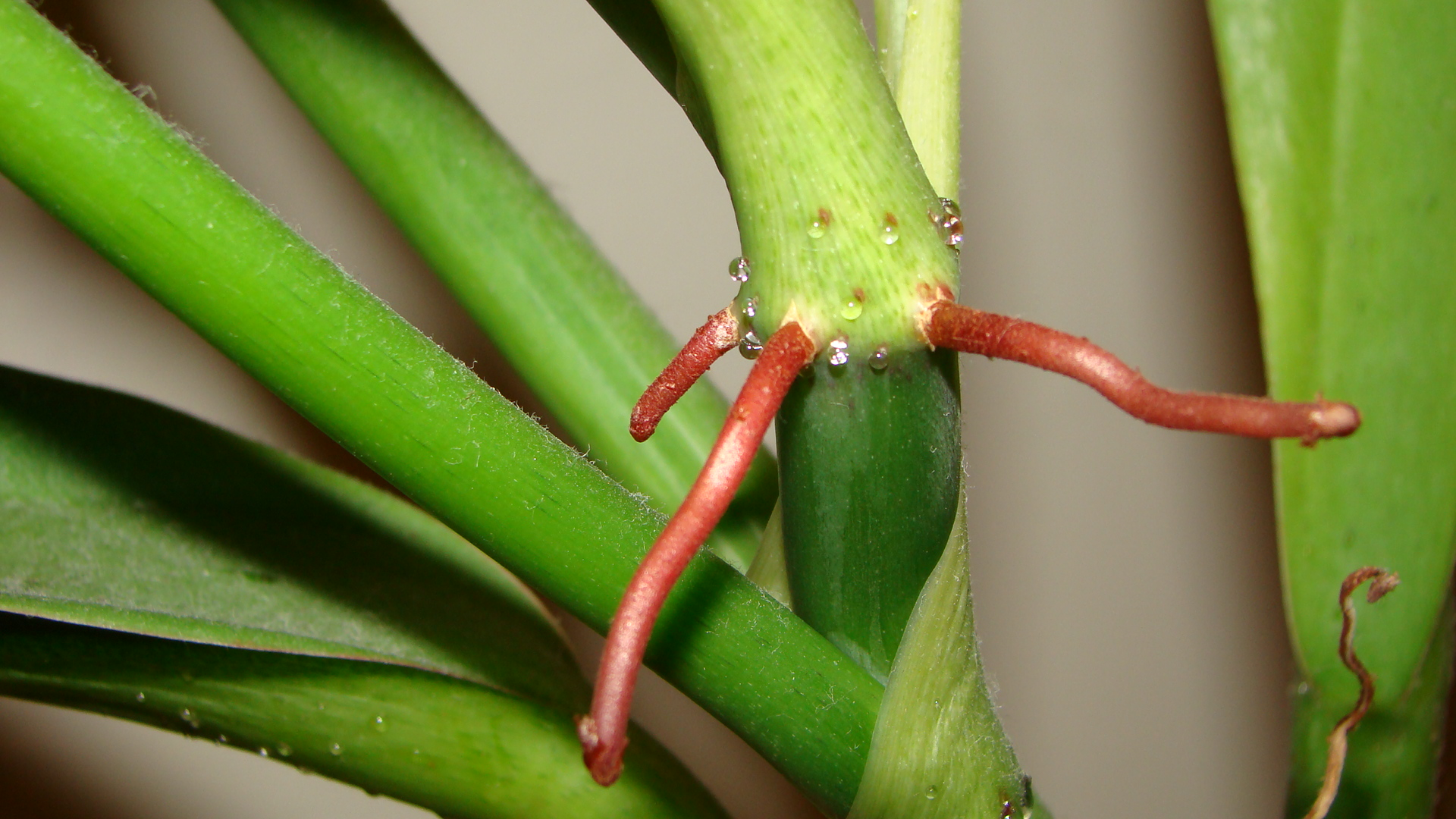
Closeup of aerial roots
