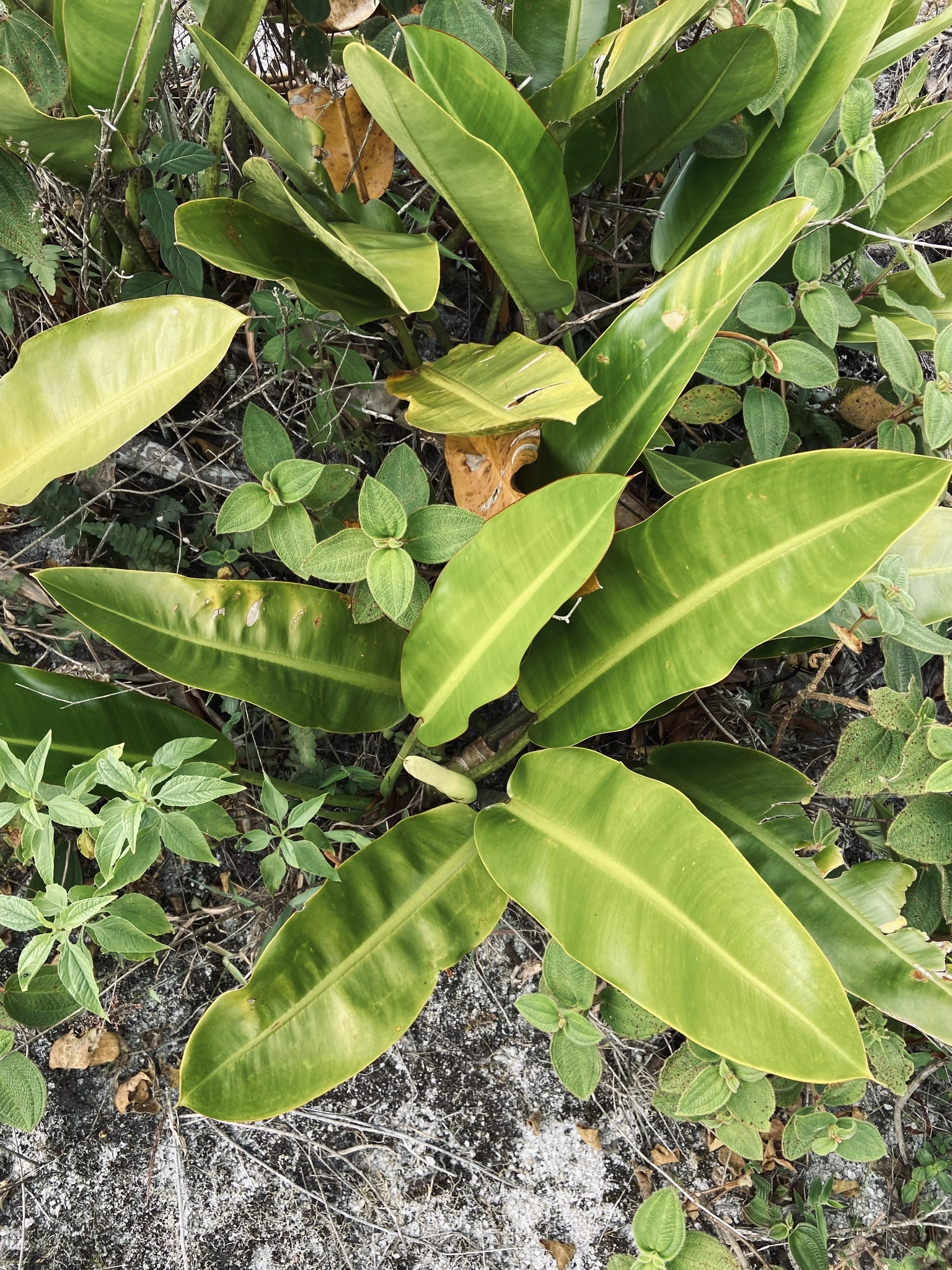
- P. edmundoi in Bahia

Scientific classification
- Kingdom: Plantae
- Clade: Tracheophytes
- Clade: Angiosperms
- Clade: Monocots
- Order: Alismatales
- Family: Araceae
- Genus: Philodendron
- Species: P. edmundoi

Binomial name
- Philodendron edmundoi Barroso

= Philodendron edmundoi =

Species of plant

Philodendron edmundoi is an endangered species of plant in the genus Philodendron native to southeastern Brazil. A member of the section Baursia, it is most closely related to Philodendron longilaminatum, Philodendron crassinervium, and Philodendron glaziovii. It is a hemi-epiphyte, but can commonly be found growing on rocks and slopes up to 1,400 meters (4,600 ft) above sea level.

== See also ==
- List of Philodendron species
