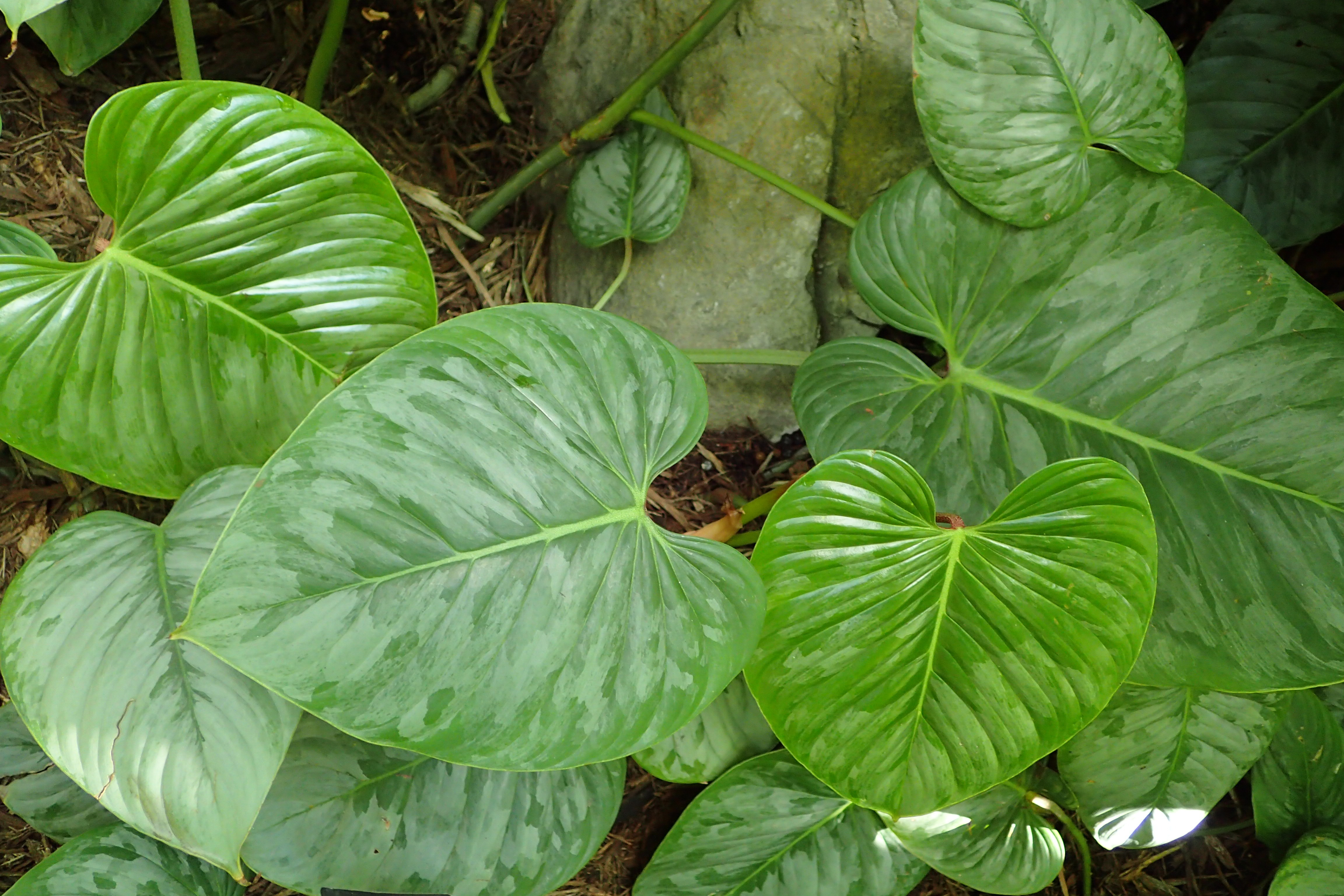
- Philodendron sodiroi in the Bolz Conservatory at the Olbrich Botanical Gardens

Scientific classification
- Kingdom: Plantae
- Clade: Tracheophytes
- Clade: Angiosperms
- Clade: Monocots
- Order: Alismatales
- Family: Araceae
- Genus: Philodendron
- Species: P. sodiroi

Binomial name
- Philodendron sodiroi N.E.Br.

= Philodendron sodiroi =

Species of plant

Philodendron sodiroi is a species of plant in the genus Philodendron native to Colombia. A climbing epiphyte, it was once thought to be synonymous with Philodendron ornatum. Named after Luis Sodiro, it was first described scientifically in 1883. It is most recognizable for the silver mottling on its green, cordate leaves.

== See also ==
- List of Philodendron species
