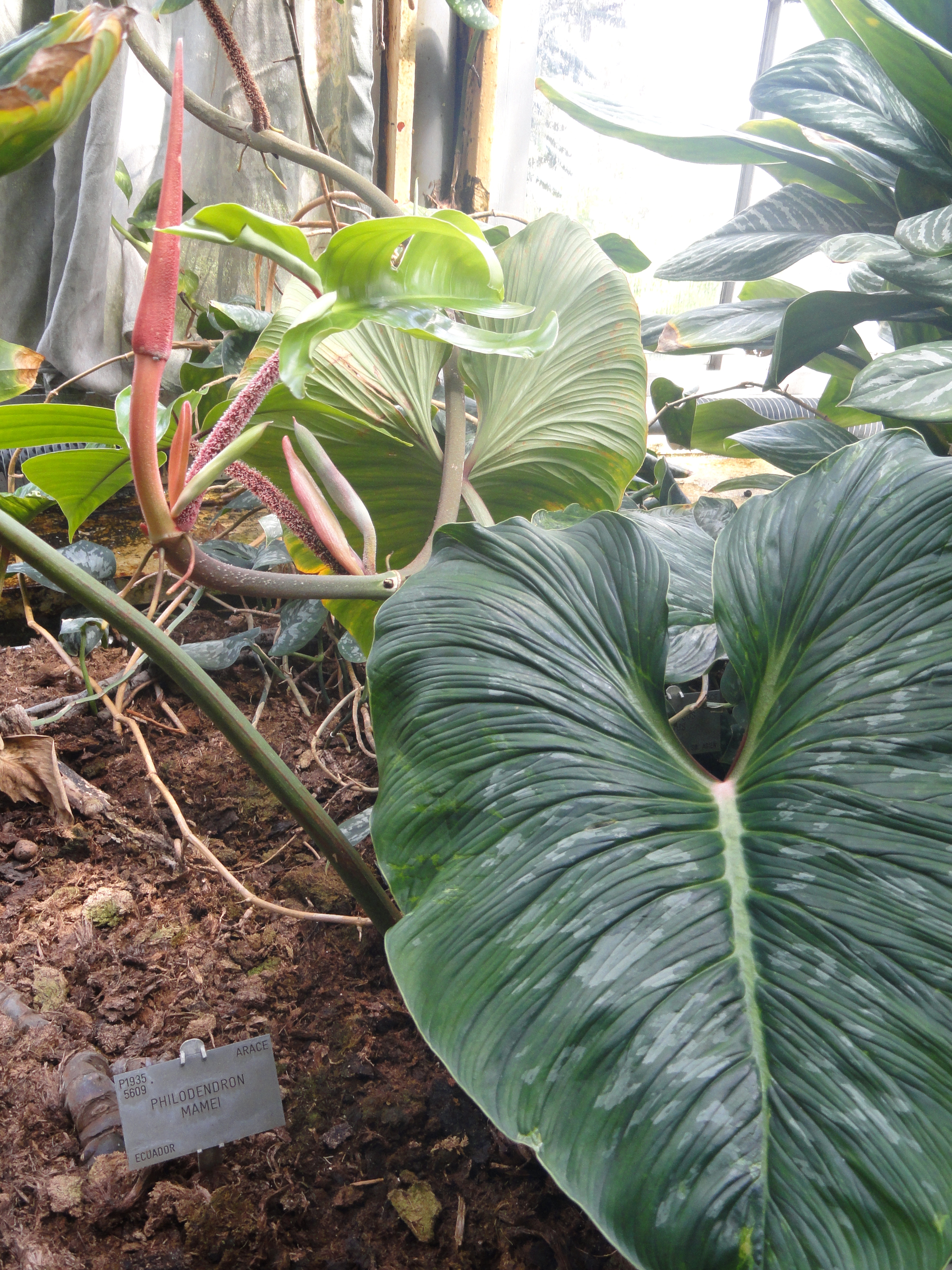
- Philodendron mamei in the Copenhagen Botanical Garden

Scientific classification
- Kingdom: Plantae
- Clade: Tracheophytes
- Clade: Angiosperms
- Clade: Monocots
- Order: Alismatales
- Family: Araceae
- Genus: Philodendron
- Species: P. mamei

Binomial name
- Philodendron mamei André

= Philodendron mamei =

Species of plant

Philodendron mamei is a species of plant in the genus Philodendron native to Ecuador. First collected by Europeans in 1882, it has long been cultivated as a houseplant. P. mamei is a terrestrial species with a creeping growth habit and prostrate stems, and it is noted for its matte dark green leaves with gray-green spots and cordate shape.

Its native range is limited to the eastern Andes of Ecuador from 731–1,830 meters (2,398–6,004 ft) in elevation. It has also been introduced as an invasive species to the Cook Islands and Society Islands.

== See also ==
- List of Philodendron species
