= Aldama linearis =

- Aldama linearis floral head

Scientific classification
- Kingdom: Plantae
- Clade: Tracheophytes
- Clade: Angiosperms
- Clade: Eudicots
- Clade: Asterids
- Order: Asterales
- Family: Asteraceae
- Tribe: Heliantheae
- Genus: Aldama
- Species: A. linearis

Binomial name
- Aldama linearis (Cav.) E.E.Schill. & Panero

Synonyms
- List: Helianthus linearis Cav.; Leighia linearis (Cav.) DC.; Rhysolepis linearis (Cav.) H.Rob. & A.J.Moore; Viguiera linearis (Cav.) Sch.Bip. ex Hemsl.; Helianthus squarrosus Kunth; Leighia elegans Cass.; Viguiera linearis var. acutior S.F.Blake; Viguiera linearis var. genuina S.F.Blake; Viguiera linearis f. latiorifolia S.F. Blake; Viguiera linearis f. typica S.F.Blake

Species of plant

Aldama linearis, with no English name, is a species of flowering plant native only to Mexico. It belongs to the family Asteraceae.

floral head with involucral bracts

dissected head showing cypselae, paleae and pappuses

leaves with young, tufted stem branches in axils

floral heads at branch tips

== Description ==
Aldama linearis at first glance looks like many other yellow-flowered members of the big Aster Family. However, the following combination of features helps distinguish it from all the others:

- It is a branched perennial which can be a herbaceous plant or shrub, growing as high as 2 m (6 ft 7 in). Vegetative parts bear short, stiff hairs.
- Narrow leaves grow up to 8.5 cm × 1.2 cm (3 3/8 in × 1/2 in) in size, though usually they are smaller and narrower than that. Mostly they arise singly along the stems, and tend to cluster at branch tips. Sometimes short, leafy branches emerge from leaf axils forming clusters of leaves. Blade margins have no teeth or indentations and may curl under at the edges.
- Floral heads usually are numerous and occur singly at branch tips. Involucral bracts number 30-40 and are arranged in 4 or 5 series. Their tips gradually diminish or are short-pointed; images on this page show slender tips projecting away from the involucre. At the head's perimeter 10-20 flat, yellow to orangish yellow, petal-like "ray florets" up to 13 mm (1/2 in) long radiate from the head's "eye," which consists of 40-70 yellow "disc florets" with cylindrical corollas. Scale-like bracts called "paleae," up to 7 mm (1/4 in) long, occur between the head's disc florets. Ray florets do not produce fruits, but disc florets do.
- The one-seeded, cypsela-type fruits bear atop them pappuses composed of stiff bristles up to 3 mm (1/8 in) long and broad scales up to 1 mm (1/32 in) long.

== Distribution ==
Aldama linearis is endemic only to Mexico. It occurs in the mostly northern and central states of Aguascalientes, Chihuahua, Coahuila, Durango, Guanajuato, Hidalgo, Jalisco, México, Michoacán, Nayarit, Nuevo León, Oaxaca, Puebla, Querétaro, San Luis Potosí, Tamaulipas, Tlaxcala, Veracruz and Zacatecas.

== Habitat ==
In the Valley of Mexico, Aldama linearis (identified as Viguiera linearis) occurs at elevations of 2,300–2,700 m (7,500–8,900 ft) in scrub, grasslands and often as secondary vegetation in disturbed, weedy areas. Elsewhere it occurs as a weed in cornfields.

== Ecology ==
In the Mexican state of Zacatecas, in an area in which the soil contains high concentrations of the heavy metals known as cadmium, lead, copper and zinc, Viguiera linearis is considered a pioneer species.

== Uses by humans ==
=== For thatch roofing ===
In central Mexico, where Aldama linearis can be a very abundant shrub component of the scrub ecosystem, the species has been used since pre-Columbian times for making thatched roofs in which its hard, resinous stems are used. Nowadays such roofs have nearly disappeared. At least one such roof, that of the reception area of a botanical garden, served well for 18 years.

=== Traditional medicine ===
In Mexico, Aldama linearis (identified as Viguiera linearis) is combined with the horsetail plant Equisetum laevigatum and used to treat mal de orín, or general urinary problems.

=== Potential for removing heavy metals from soil ===
Unpublished laboratory results by university researchers indicate that vegetative parts of Aldama linearis are biosorbant and can bind, concentrate and remove pollutants, particularly the heavy metals of lead and zinc. This suggests possible use of the species in bioremediation.

== Taxonomy ==
In 1795 when Antonio José de Cavanilles formally described and named Aldama linearis, using the basionym Helianthus linearis, he remarked that his material, which grew in the Real Jardín Botánico de Madrid, was native to the Mexican Empire (New Spain). The source of the garden material was a location Cavanilles referred to in Latin as Hapam. "Hapam" could have been what is now Xalapa, though vegetation in that area is a bit lush for Aldama linearis. Perhaps more likely is the town of Jalpan de Serra, usually just called Jalpan, around which there is scrub appropriate for the species.

=== Phylogeny ===
Molecular phylogenetic analysis based on Bayesian analyses of internal transcribed spacer sequence data suggests that of the approximtely 350 species of the subtribe Helianthinae studied, Aldama linearis was sister to a clade comprising Aldama dentata and Aldama squarrosa.

=== Etymology ===
The genus name Aldama was established in 1824 by Pablo de la Llave and his collaborator Juan José Martínez de Lejarza in their book Novorum vegetabilium descriptiones. Both authors were Mexican and in their publication they named new genera and species of Mexican plants after "... the brightest Mexican people, the greatest spirits, the excellent minds..." In the publication's dedication he lists the Mexican lawyer, merchant and rebel leader Ignacio Aldama, who the genus name apparently honors.

The species name linearis derives from the Late Latin linealis, meaning "pertaining to a line, a string" etc., aptly describing the very slender leaves of Aldama linearis.
