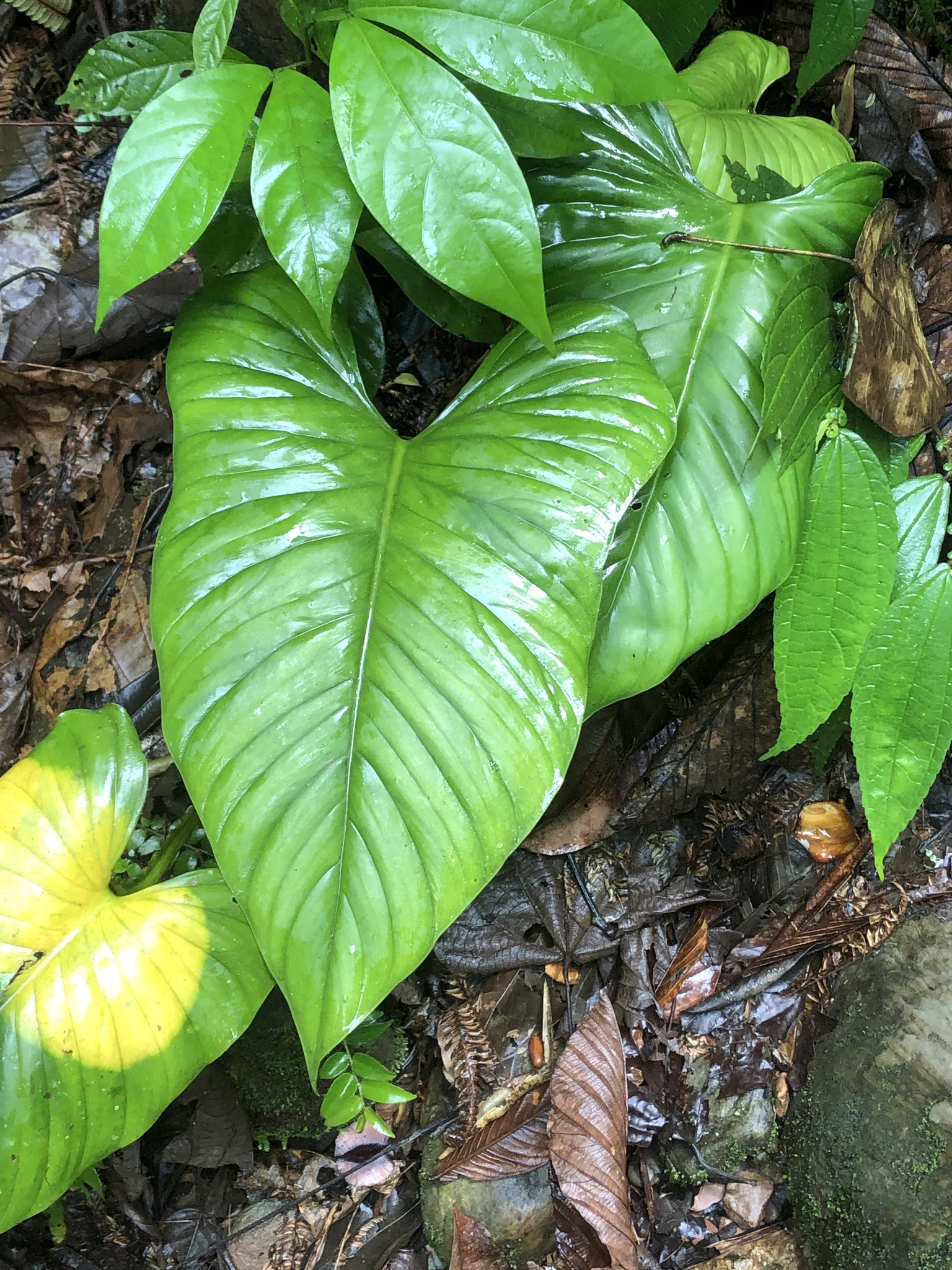
- In Peru
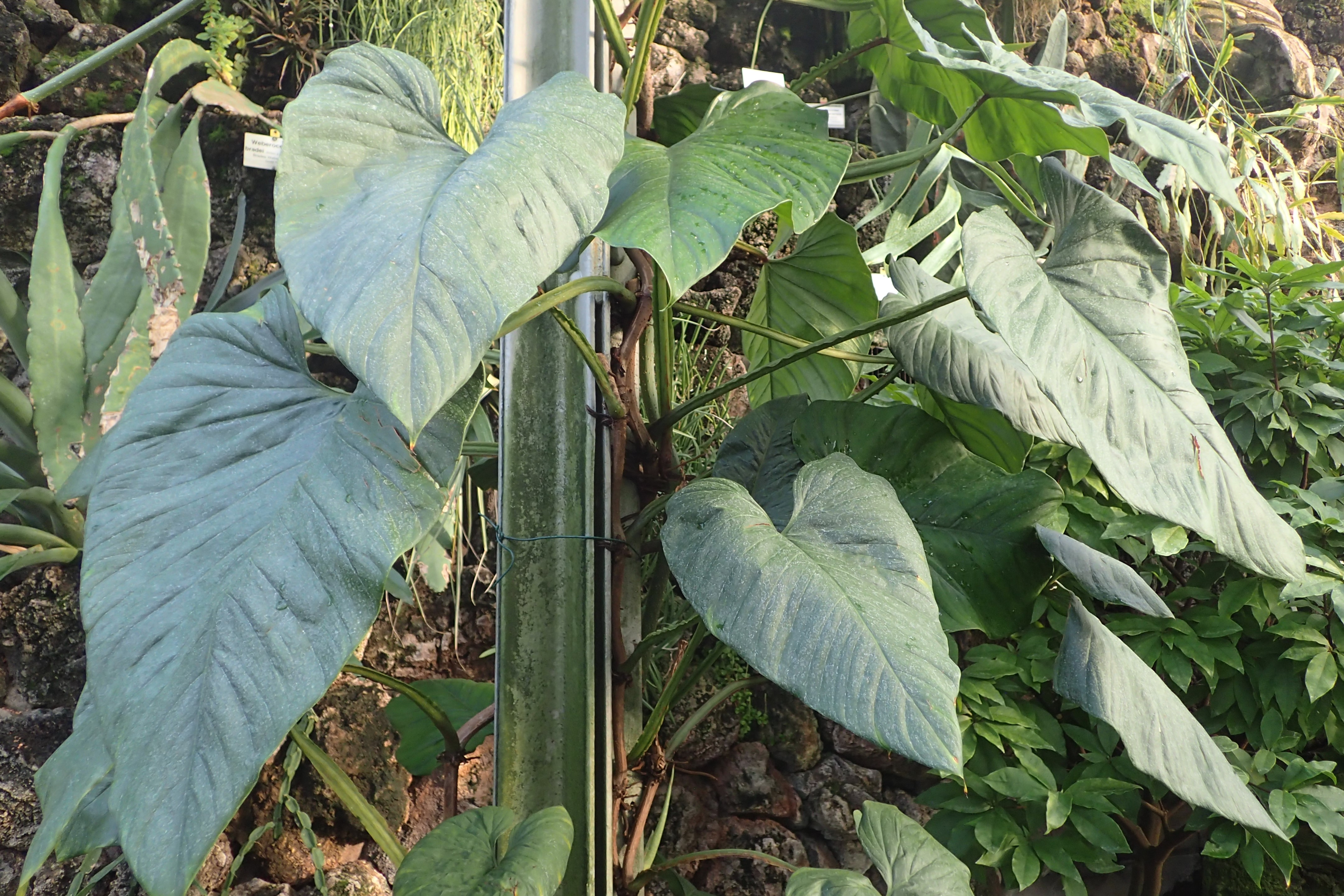
- At the Berlin Botanical Garden and Botanical Museum

Scientific classification
- Kingdom: Plantae
- Clade: Tracheophytes
- Clade: Angiosperms
- Clade: Monocots
- Order: Alismatales
- Family: Araceae
- Genus: Philodendron
- Species: P. ernestii

Binomial name
- Philodendron ernestii Engl.

= Philodendron ernestii =

Species of plant

Philodendron ernestii is a species of flowering plant in the family Araceae. It is native to western South America and northern Brazil. A hemiepiphyte, it is typically found in wet tropical forests, where it is a gap specialist.
