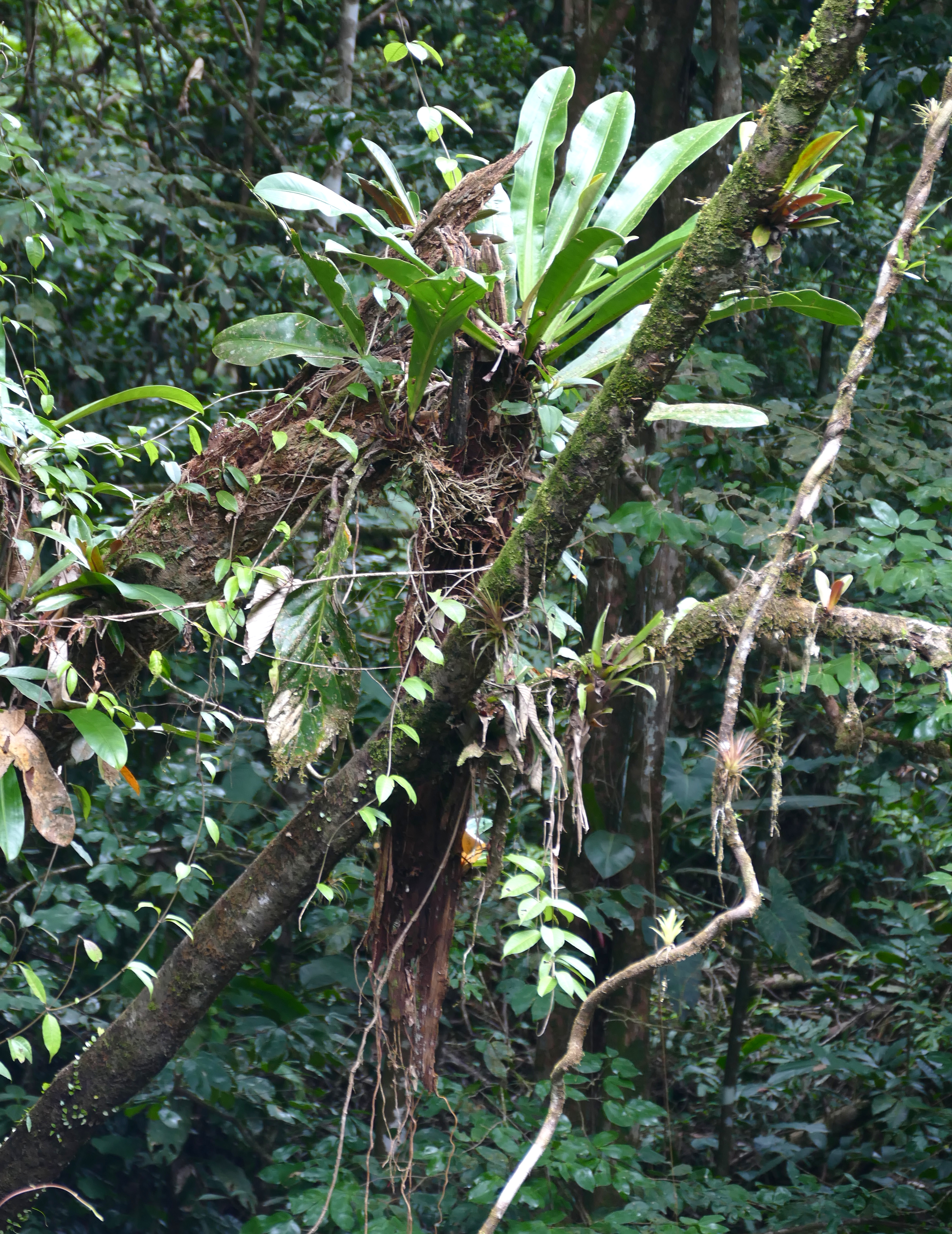
- In French Guiana
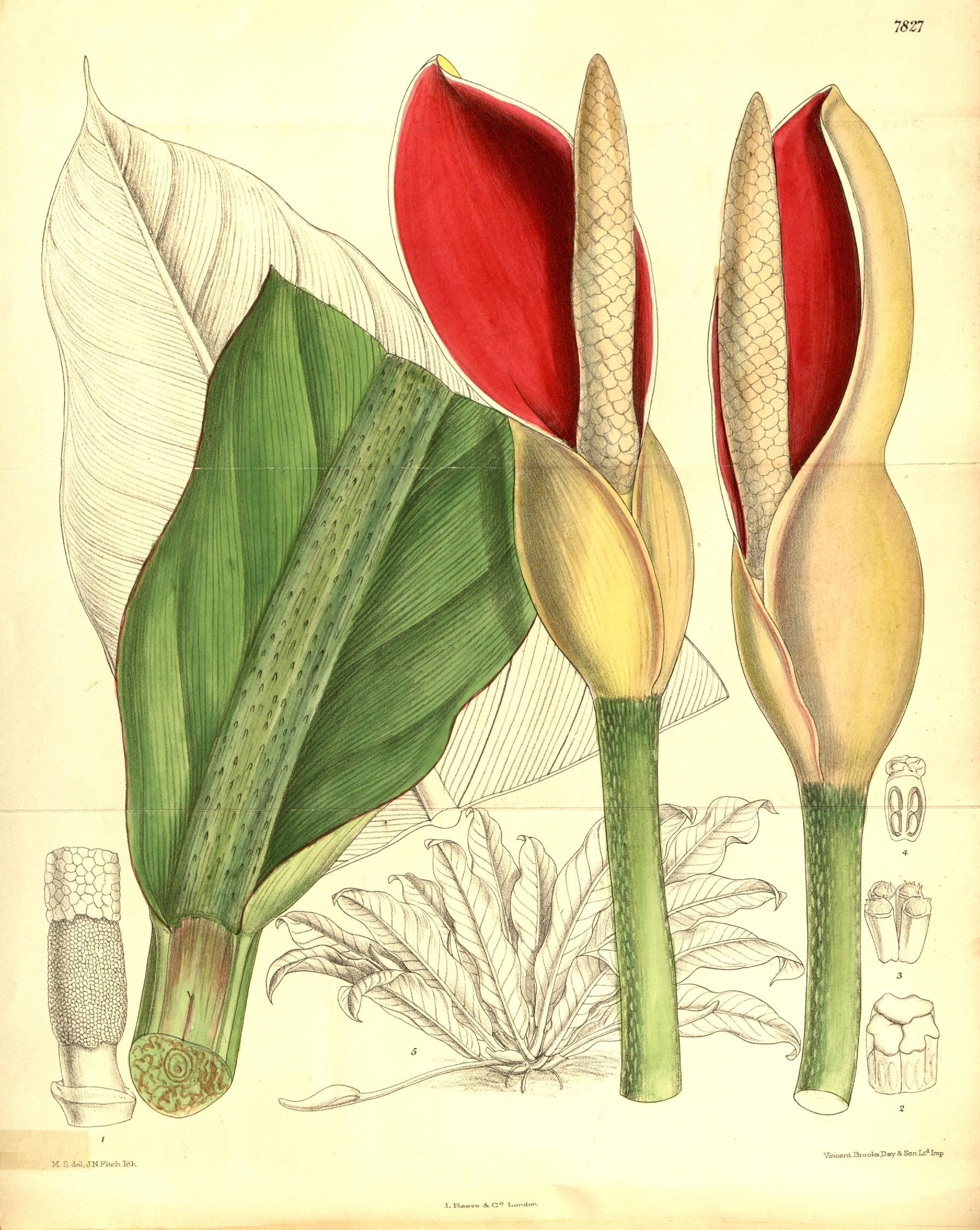
- Botanical illustration

Scientific classification
- Kingdom: Plantae
- Clade: Tracheophytes
- Clade: Angiosperms
- Clade: Monocots
- Order: Alismatales
- Family: Araceae
- Genus: Philodendron
- Species: P. insigne

Binomial name
- Philodendron insigne Schott

Synonyms
- Philodendron calophyllum Brongn. ex Linden & André; Philodendron haematinum R.E.Schult.; Philodendron niveochermesinum Linden & André; Philodendron prieureanum Brongn. ex Engl.

= Philodendron insigne =

Species of plant

Philodendron insigne is a species of flowering plant in the family Araceae, It is native to western and northern South America, and Brazil. A trash-basket epiphyte that hosts ants, it is found in wet tropical forests.
