= Aldama media =

Conservation status
- Critically Endangered (IUCN 3.1)

Scientific classification
- Kingdom: Plantae
- Clade: Embryophytes
- Clade: Tracheophytes
- Clade: Angiosperms
- Clade: Eudicots
- Clade: Asterids
- Order: Asterales
- Family: Asteraceae
- Tribe: Heliantheae
- Genus: Aldama
- Species: A. media

Binomial name
- Aldama media S.F.Blake

Synonyms
- Rhysolepis media (S.F.Blake) H.Rob. & A.J.Moore in Proc. Biol. Soc. Washington 117: 429 (2004); Viguiera media S.F.Blake in Contr. Gray Herb. 54: 138 (1918)

Species of flowering plant

Aldama media is a species of flowering plant in the family Asteraceae. It is found only in Ecuador. Its natural habitat is near saline lakes, growing in dry forests, scrublands and grasslands. It is threatened by habitat loss.

After molecular phylogenetic studies by botanists Schilling and Panero in 2011, showed that some species that were formerly classified in the genus Viguiera and then transferred to genus Aldama.

It is a perennial, herbaceous plant with a woody base and can grow up to 1 m (3 ft 3 in) tall, with small, white flowers with five petals and yellow centers. The seeds are small and black.
