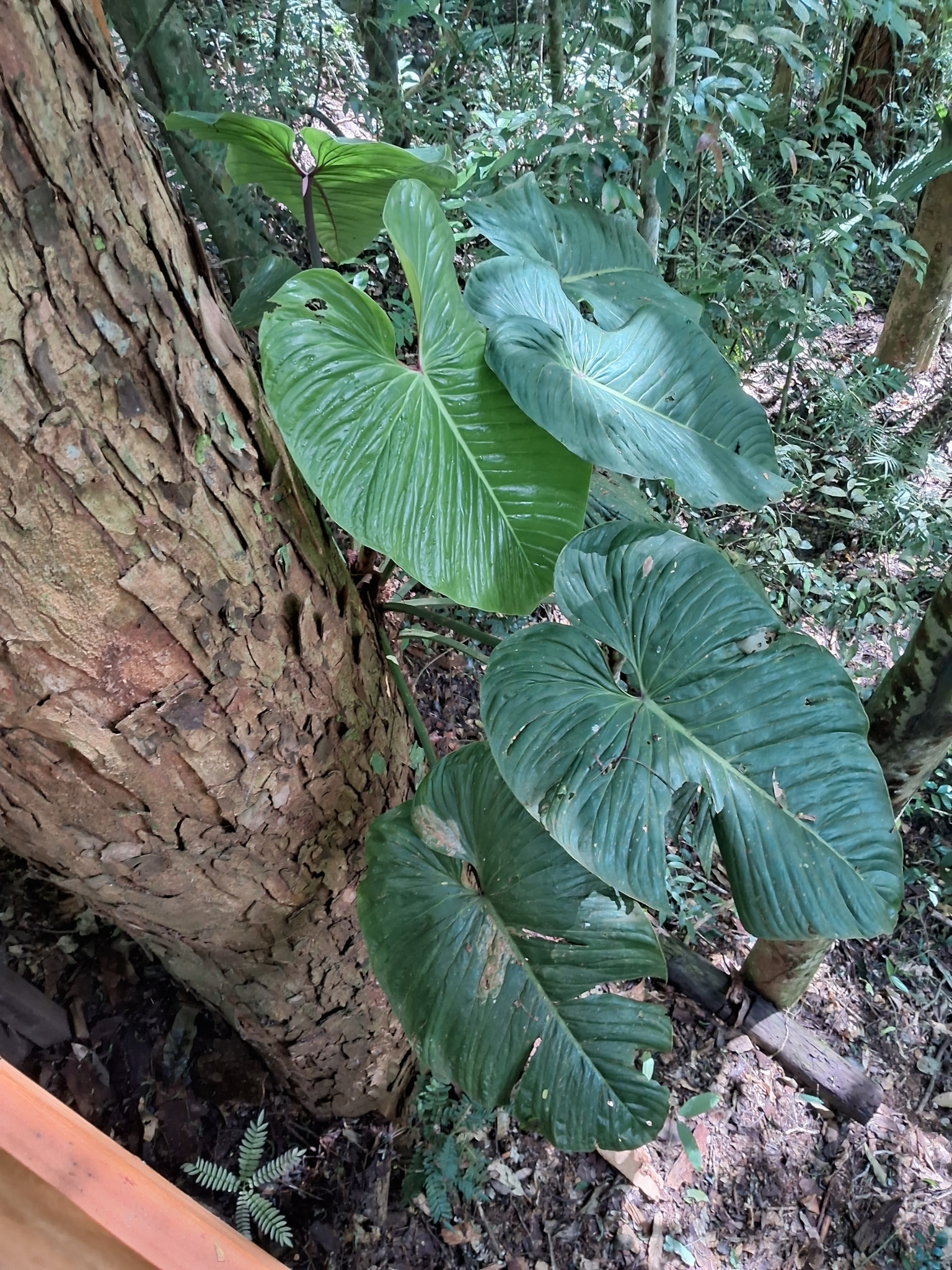
- Philodendron ornatum growing in Brazil

Scientific classification
- Kingdom: Plantae
- Clade: Tracheophytes
- Clade: Angiosperms
- Clade: Monocots
- Order: Alismatales
- Family: Araceae
- Genus: Philodendron
- Species: P. ornatum

Binomial name
- Philodendron ornatum Schott

= Philodendron ornatum =

Species of plant

Philodendron ornatum is a species of evergreen climbing plant in the genus Philodendron native to tropical South America and Trinidad and Tobago. This species has distinct leaves, stems, and flowers that can vary in appearance depending on the specific cultivar. It is highly regarded for its striking appearance, featuring large, glossy green leaves that have silver blotches in the juvenile stage. It was once classified as synonymous with Philodendron sodiroi.

== See also ==
- List of Philodendron species
