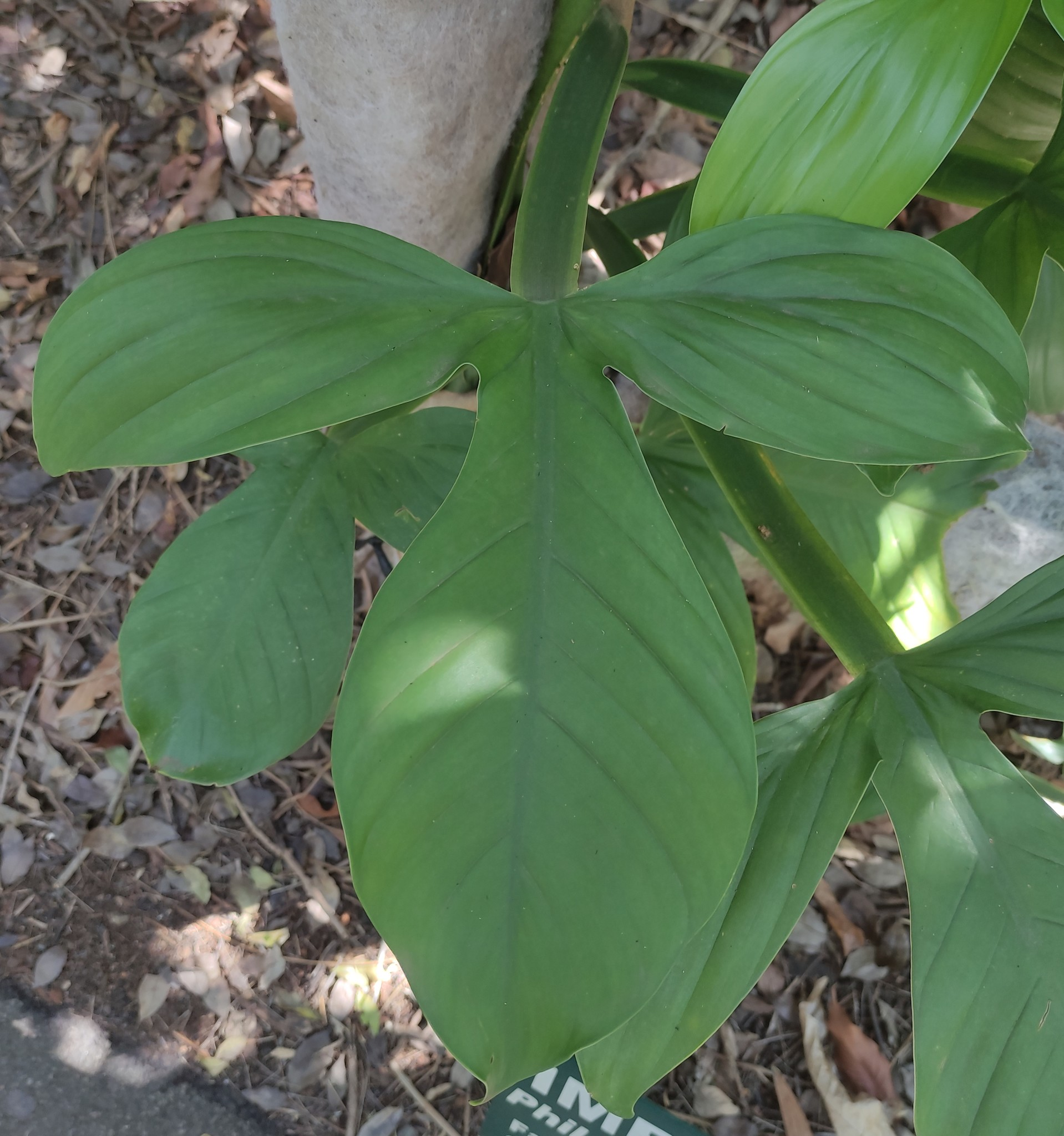

Scientific classification
- Kingdom: Plantae
- Clade: Embryophytes
- Clade: Tracheophytes
- Clade: Spermatophytes
- Clade: Angiosperms
- Clade: Monocots
- Order: Alismatales
- Family: Araceae
- Genus: Philodendron
- Species: P. applanatum

Binomial name
- Philodendron applanatum G.M.Barroso

= Philodendron applanatum =

Species of plant

Philodendron applanatum is a plant species native to the areas of Brazil, Colombia, and Peru.

== See also ==
- List of Philodendron species
