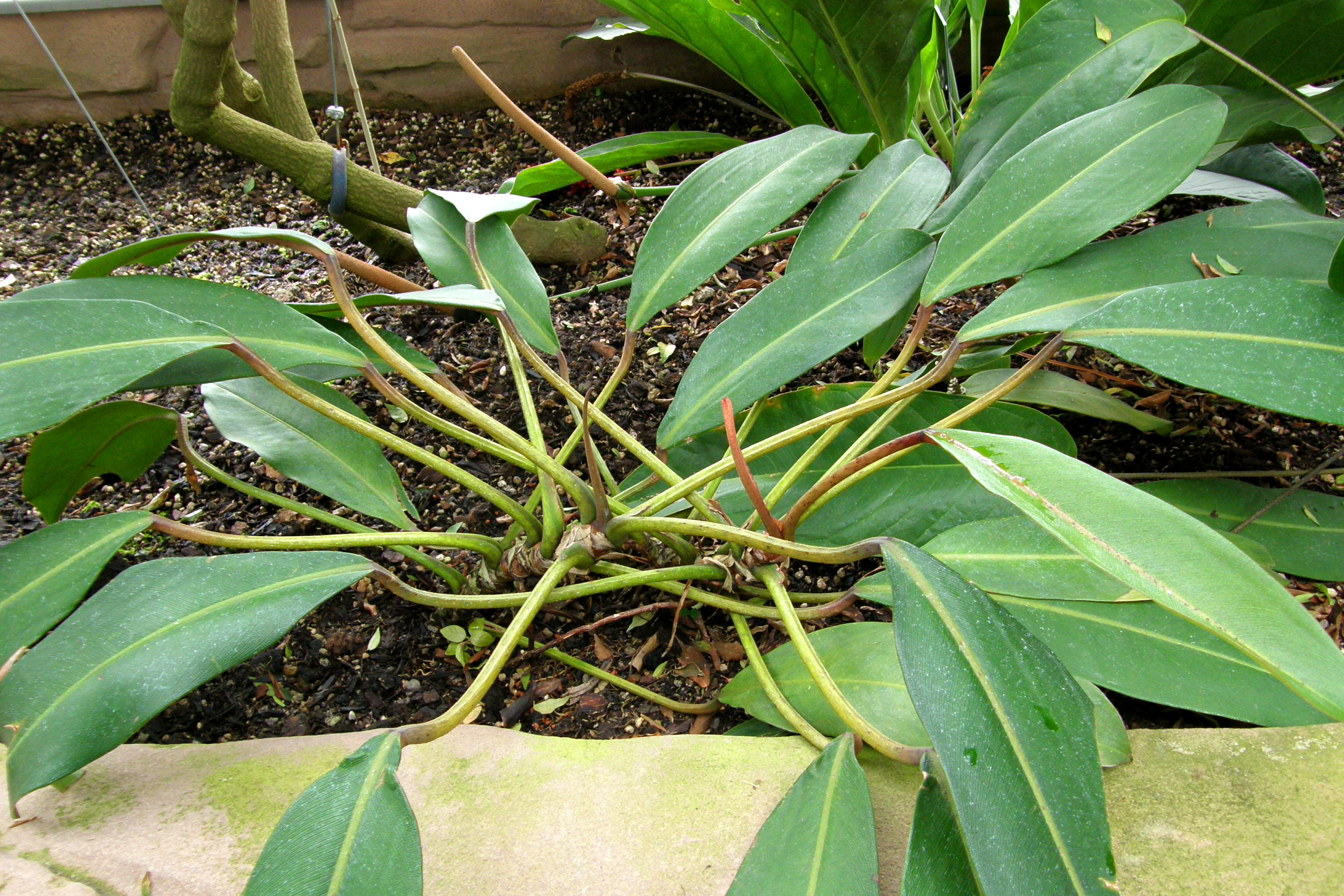
- In the Berlin Botanical Garden and Botanical Museum

Scientific classification
- Kingdom: Plantae
- Clade: Tracheophytes
- Clade: Angiosperms
- Clade: Monocots
- Order: Alismatales
- Family: Araceae
- Genus: Philodendron
- Species: P. callosum

Binomial name
- Philodendron callosum K.Krause

Synonyms
- Philodendron ptarianum Steyerm.

= Philodendron callosum =

Species of plant

Philodendron callosum is a species of flowering plant in the family Araceae. An epiphyte, it is native to wet forests of northern South America. Its floral scents dihydro-β-ionone and 2-hydroxy-5-methyl-3-hexanone serve to attract its pollinators, scarab beetles of the genus Cyclocephala. With its leathery, glossy leaves it has found use as a houseplant.

== Subtaxa ==
The following subspecies are accepted:

- Philodendron callosum subsp. callosum – Venezuela, Guyana, French Guiana, northern Brazil
- Philodendron callosum subsp. ptarianum (Steyerm.) G.S.Bunting – Venezuela, Guyana, northern Brazil
