= Aldama sodiroi =

Conservation status
- Vulnerable (IUCN 3.1)

Scientific classification
- Kingdom: Plantae
- Clade: Tracheophytes
- Clade: Angiosperms
- Clade: Eudicots
- Clade: Asterids
- Order: Asterales
- Family: Asteraceae
- Tribe: Heliantheae
- Genus: Aldama
- Species: A. sodiroi

Binomial name
- Aldama sodiroi (Hieron.) E.E.Schill. & Panero

Synonyms
- Helianthus sodiroi Hieron. in Bot. Jahrb. Syst. 29: 41 (1900); Rhysolepis sodiroi (Hieron.) H.Rob. & A.J.Moore in Proc. Biol. Soc. Washington 117: 431 (2004); Viguiera sodiroi S.F.Blake in Contr. Gray Herb. 54: 139 (1918)

Species of flowering plant

Aldama sodiroi is a species of flowering plant in the family Asteraceae. It is found only in Ecuador. Its natural habitat is subtropical or tropical moist montane forests. It is threatened by habitat loss.

After molecular phylogenetic studies by botanists Schilling and Panero in 2011, showed that some species that were formerly classified in the genus Viguiera, were then transferred to genus Aldama.

The specific epithet of sodiroi refers to Luis Sodiro (1836–1909), who was an Italian Jesuit priest and a field botanist, who collected many plants in Ecuador.
