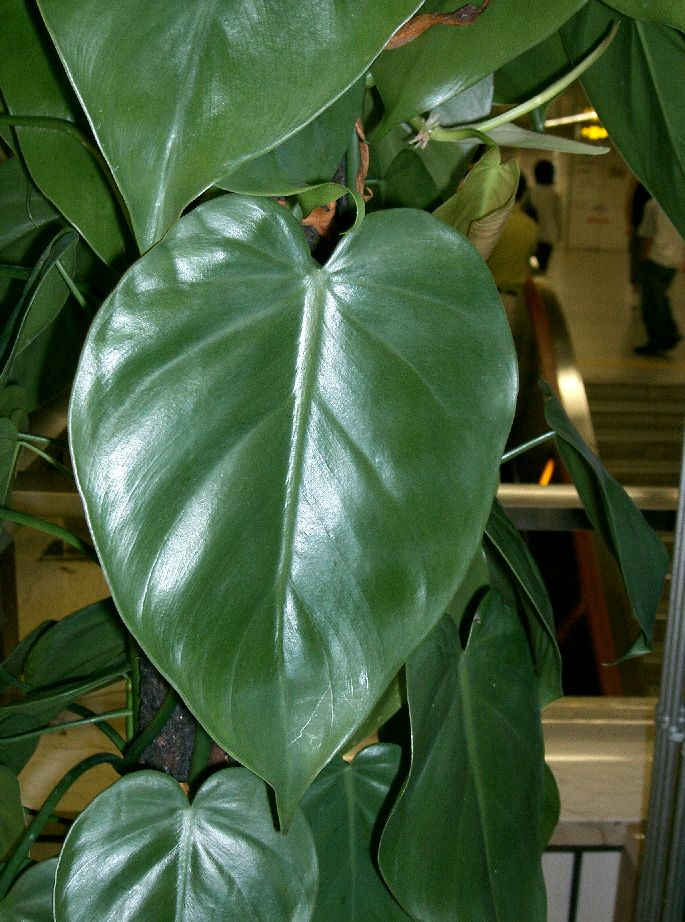
- Philodendron hederaceum var. oxycardium

Scientific classification
- Kingdom: Plantae
- Clade: Embryophytes
- Clade: Tracheophytes
- Clade: Spermatophytes
- Clade: Angiosperms
- Clade: Monocots
- Order: Alismatales
- Family: Araceae
- Genus: Philodendron
- Species: P. hederaceum

Binomial name
- Philodendron hederaceum Schott

Varieties
- Philodendron hederaceum var. hederaceum Philodendron hederaceum var. kirkbridei Philodendron hederaceum var. oxycardium

Synonyms
- Philodendron cuspidatum K. Koch & C. D. Bouché; Philodendron micans K. Koch; Philodendron scandens K. Koch & Sello

= Philodendron hederaceum =

Species of flowering plant

Philodendron hederaceum, the heartleaf philodendron (syn. Philodendron scandens) is a species of flowering plant in the family Araceae, native to Central America and the Caribbean which is common in the houseplant trade. Philodendron hederaceum var. hederaceum, the "velvet philodendron," is a subspecies which is in the houseplant trade under its previous name of Philodendron micans. While toxic under certain conditions, it is also under current review for numerous health benefits.

== Etymology ==
The name Philodendron originates from the Greek words "Philo", meaning "love", and "dendron", meaning "tree". P. hederaceum are most comfortable growing in an upwards fashion, usually up the trunk of a tree, hence, the name Philodendron.

== Description and cultivation ==
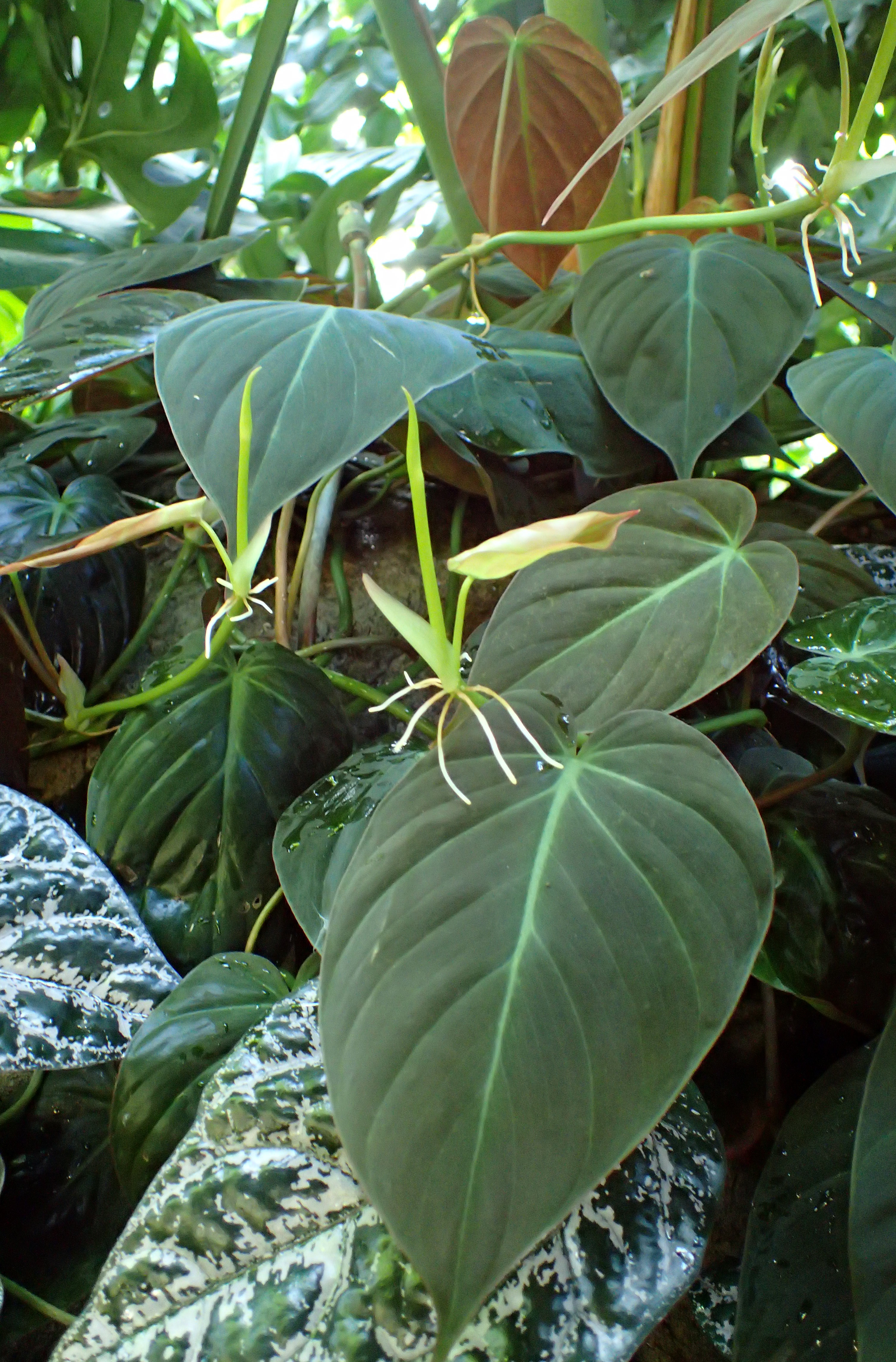
Philodendron hederaceum var. hederaceum, sold under the trade name Philodendron micans, or velvet-leaf philodendron, at the Bolz Conservatory in Madison, Wisconsin

Phylogenetic relationships of related species

- - - - - - - - P. sagittifolium
              - P. hederaceum
            - P. squamiferum
          - P. ornatum
        - P. pterotum
      - P. panamense
    - P. fragrantissimum
  - all other Philodendron species

Cladogram of 7 most closely related species according to the Open Tree of Life

It is an evergreen climber growing to 3–6 m (10–20 ft), with heart-shaped glossy leaves to 30 cm (12 in) long, and occasionally spathes of white flowers in mature plants. With a minimum temperature requirement of 15 °C (59 °F), in temperate regions it must be grown under glass or as a houseplant. Under the synonym Philodendron scandens it has gained the Royal Horticultural Society's Award of Garden Merit. P. hederaceum have simple leaves that are arranged in an alternate fashion, meaning single leaves are born on alternating nodes.

P. hederaceum can grow with its roots both in and out of the soil, deeming it a semi-epiphyte. Its uses include ornamental household decoration. It is a popular choice for such display due to its striking green coloration, spiraling, fast growing leaves, and convenient size. P. hederaceum are also easy to maintain, requiring medium sunlight and moist soil. Philodendron hederaceum will eventually grow white flowers (approximately 15 years after planting). Inflorescences are rare; spike inflorescences are the most common when one does appear. They have the capacity to bear fruits as well. Philodendron fruits are typically orange, red, or white berries. Philodendron are particularly skilled at eliminating toxins such as formaldehyde from the air.

== Toxicity ==
Parts of the plant are known to contain calcium oxalate crystals in varying concentrations. These calcium oxalate crystals are deposited in organs such as the kidneys, and can cause cardiac-related issues in humans. Although the plant is known to be toxic to mice and rats, the current literature is conflicting with regards to its toxicity in cats.

Although Philodendron species can be harmful if ingested, they also have a reputation of being a source of potential therapeutic applications for medical research. This reputation is due to the presence of terpenoids and flavonoids, natural compounds that are of interest because of their biological abilities in acting as an antioxidant, anti-inflammatory, and disease preventative.

According to the American Society for the Prevention of Cruelty to Animals, Philodendron hederaceum can cause oral irritation, a painful and swollen mouth, lips, and tongue, drooling, vomiting (except in horses), and difficulty swallowing in animals.

== Propagation ==
Layering and cutting are two of the favored techniques when it comes to propagating P. hederaceum. It is best to propagate during the spring and summer. To begin propagation, locate an axillary bud and cut a branch directly beneath it. This branch should then be placed in soil or water with a small amount of activated charcoal. Treatment includes moving the plant to a place of bright sunlight, but one should avoid direct sunlight.
