= Luis Sodiro =

Ecuadorian botanist (1836–1909)

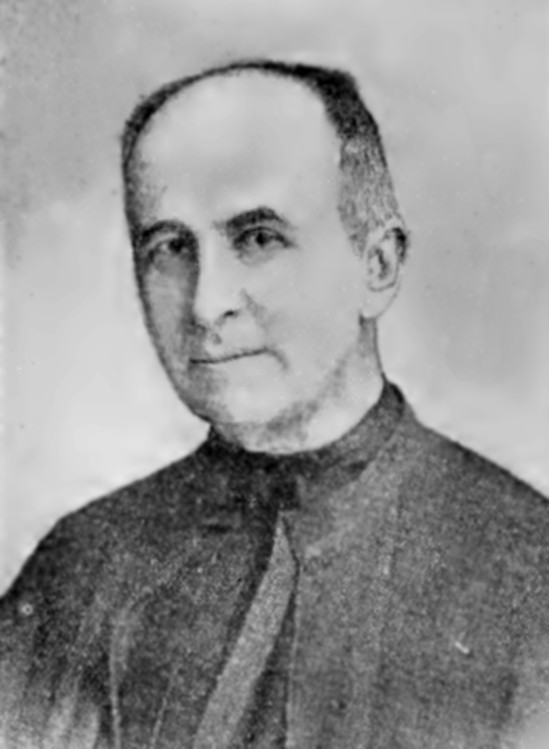
- Born: 29 May 1836; Cornedo Vicentino
- Died: 15 May 1909 (aged 72); Quito
- Occupation: Botanist; botanical collector; scientific collector
- Academic career
- Author abbrev. (botany): Sodiro

Luis Sodiro (1836–1909) was an Italian Jesuit priest and a field botanist from Vicenza who described a large number of species from the area around Quito, Ecuador in the early 20th century. He was perhaps the first person who collected in this region and he described at least 38 species from Esmeraldas, a region in Ecuador.

== Biography ==
He was born in Italy in 1836, in the town of Vicenza in the province of Venice. When he was twenty years old, in 1856, he entered the Order of the Society of Jesus, and went to study theology at the Innsbruck, Austria. He also studied philosophy, languages and natural sciences. He was one of the first botanists to truly collect and identify specimens in the field.

He is one of the protagonists of the Golden age of Ecuadorian botany which started in 1870 when Ecuadorian Ecuadorian President and aristocrat Gabriel García Moreno brought members of a German Jesuits Order to manage the National Polytechnic School and the Quito Astronomical Observatory in Quito. The group consisted of naturalist Theodor Wolf, astronomer Juan Bautista Menten, architect José Kolberg, José Epping, chemist Luis Dressel and botanist Luis Sodiro. Sodiro taught courses at the school as well as in the Central University in Quito and where he replaced Professor Jameson.

His botanical work was based on the collection of plant specimens from throughout Ecuador but with special emphasis on the surroundings of Quito including those on mountain peaks such as Corazón and Pichincha. Carried out over thirty-eight years. The results of his findings were published in monographs, booklet catalogs, and articles. It followed the botanic classification established by A. P. de Candolle in his work Prodromus Systematis Naturalis Regni Vegetabilis. He had collected many specimens and then sent them to Kew to be later recorded and described by English botanist J. G. Baker.

During his career, he gifted a total of 4226 specimens to the Central University of Ecuador. He also donated his herbarium to St. Gabriel College, Quito, which was later concentrated in the Ecuadorian Library Aurelio Espinosa Polit (QPLS). There are approximately 20,000 specimens of which approximately 13,500 have been preserved to date.

His life suddenly changed after the murder of President García Moreno in 1876, as the Polytechnic School closed its doors. President Antonio Borrero he had offered to continue with the university but the revolution started by Ignacio de Veintemilla prevented it. Then Sodiro went to live in the Jesuit school in Pifo, as Professor of Humanities. He was very intelligent and had a prodigious memory. He knew great excerpts from Virgil and Horacio so he also stood among his fellow teaching staff.

In 1883, he wrote a book, Recensio Crytogamarum Vascularium Quitensium.

He also wrote in 1890–1893, Cryptogamae Vasculares Quitenses Adiectis Speciebus in Aliis Provinciis Ditionis Ecudorensis Hactenus Detectis which described all known Pteridophyte (Ferns) in the area.

He became the first director of the Quito Botanical Garden in 1889, which was founded by her personal friend Marieta de Veintimilla wife of the President, Ignacio de Veintimilla.

President José María Plácido Caamano named him the "Botanist of the Nation" in order to honor his scientific and humanistic work, especially in botany through the books and his publications. Luis was always philanthropic and voluntarily helped beekeepers in that country.

Manuel María Pólit asked him to review Historia del Reino de Quito, written by Juan de Velasco (1727–1792) in order to identify and classify the plants and animals that Velasco had included in his work. Unfortunately due to his health, Sodiro failed to finish his review. His botanical knowledge was recognized and he published in scientific journals such as the Botanische Jahrbucher fur Systematik, Pflanzengeschichte und Planzengeograpie in Germany. He also published in the Chilean Journal of Natural History.

== Selected publications ==
Include;

- Notes on the Ecuadorian vegetation. Quito 1874.
- Recensio Cryptogamae Vasculares Quitenses 1883.
- Relationship on the eruption of Cotopaxi occurred on June 26, 1877 - Quito: Impr. national, 1877
- In the bulletin of the Quito Astronomical Observatory, 1879.
- Ecuadorian grasses in the province of Quito - Annals of the University of Quito, 1880
- Reflections on Ecuadorian agriculture - Quito: Imp. of the Government, 1883
- Contribuciones al conocimiento de la flora ecuatoriana (translated - Contributions to the knowledge of Ecuadorian flora); Monographia II. Ecuadorian anturios - Quito: Tip. of the School of Arts and Crafts, 1903

== Honours ==
He is honoured in the name of around 297 species records including;

- (Alstroemeriaceae) Bomarea sodiroana Kraenzl.
- (Annonaceae) Guatteria sodiroi Diels
- (Apiaceae) Bowlesia sodiroana H. Wolff
- (Araceae) Philodendron sodiroi Hort.
- (Araliaceae) Oreopanax sodiroi Harms
- (Arecaceae) Geonoma sodiroi Dammer ex Burret
- (Asclepiadaceae) Scyphostelma sodiroi K. Schum.
- (Aspleniaceae) Asplenium sodiroi Christ in Pittier
- (Asteraceae) Acmella sodiroi (Hieron.) R.K. Jansen
- (Asteraceae) Aldama sodiroi (Hieron.) E.E.Schill. & Panero
- (Begoniaceae) Semibegoniella sodiroi C.DC .
- (Campanulaceae) Burmeistera sodiroana Zahlbr.
- (Ericaceae) Sphyrospermum sodiroi (Hoerold) A.C.Sm.
- (Fabaceae) Nephromeria sodiroana Schindl.
- (Grammitidaceae) Grammitis sodiroi (Christ & Rosenst.) C.V. Morton
- (Marcgraviaceae) Marcgraviastrum sodiroi (Gilg) Bedell ex S.Dressler
- (Myrsinaceae) Cybianthus sodiroanus (Mez) G.Agostini
- (Orchidaceae) Elleanthus sodiroi Schltr. Schltr.
- (Woodsiaceae) Diplazium sodiroanum C.Chr.

The volume of new species he identified, is large: there are about 1019 names published by Sodiro in IPNI on newly discovered species, which he usually published in Annals Univ. Centr. Ecuador, Sert. Fl. Ecuad., Rec., Chilean Hist Magazine. Nat., Crypt. Vasc. Quit.Anal. Univ. Quito and Anthurios Equator.
