= Transport in Yunnan =

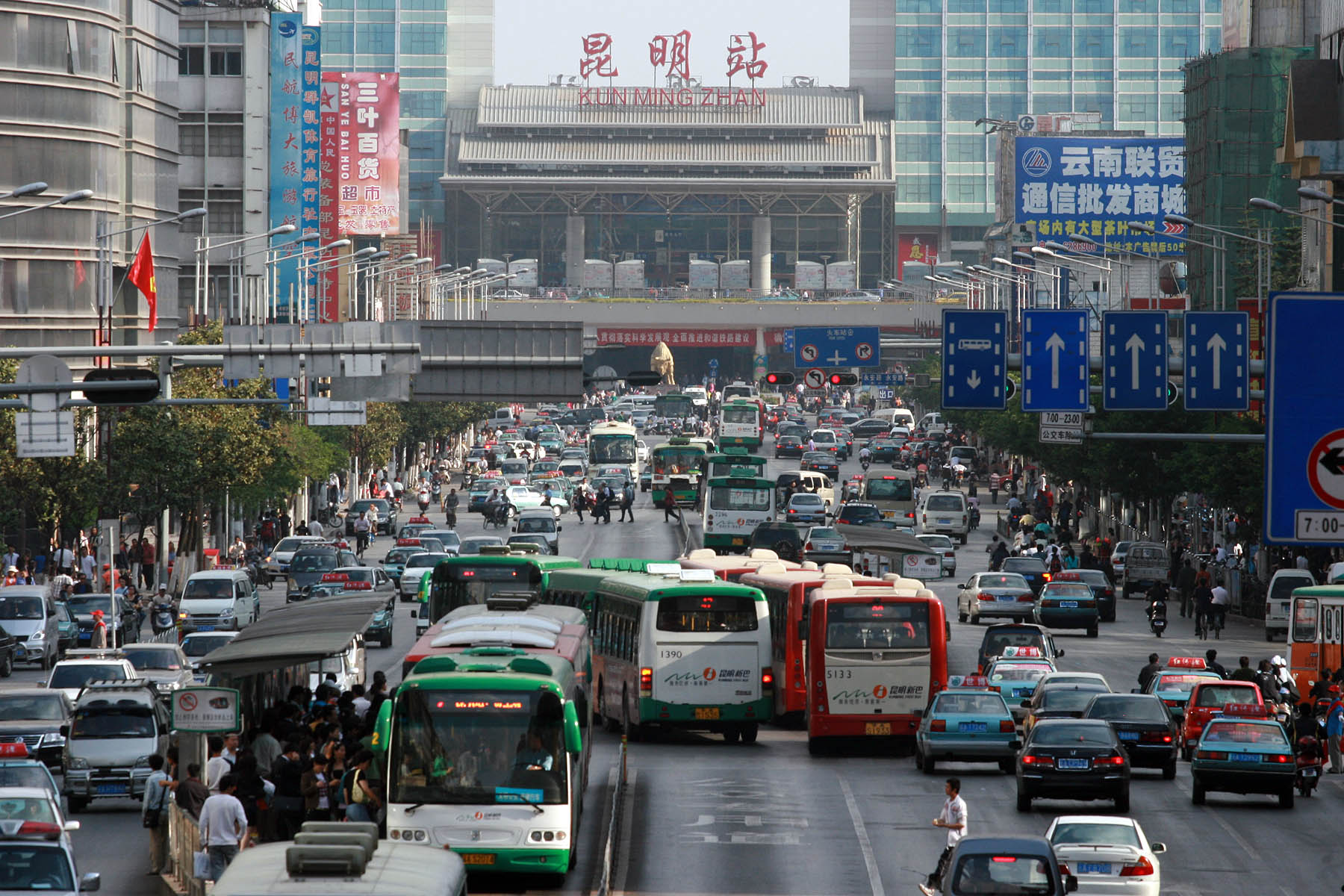
A crowded street in Kunming near the Kunming Railway Station

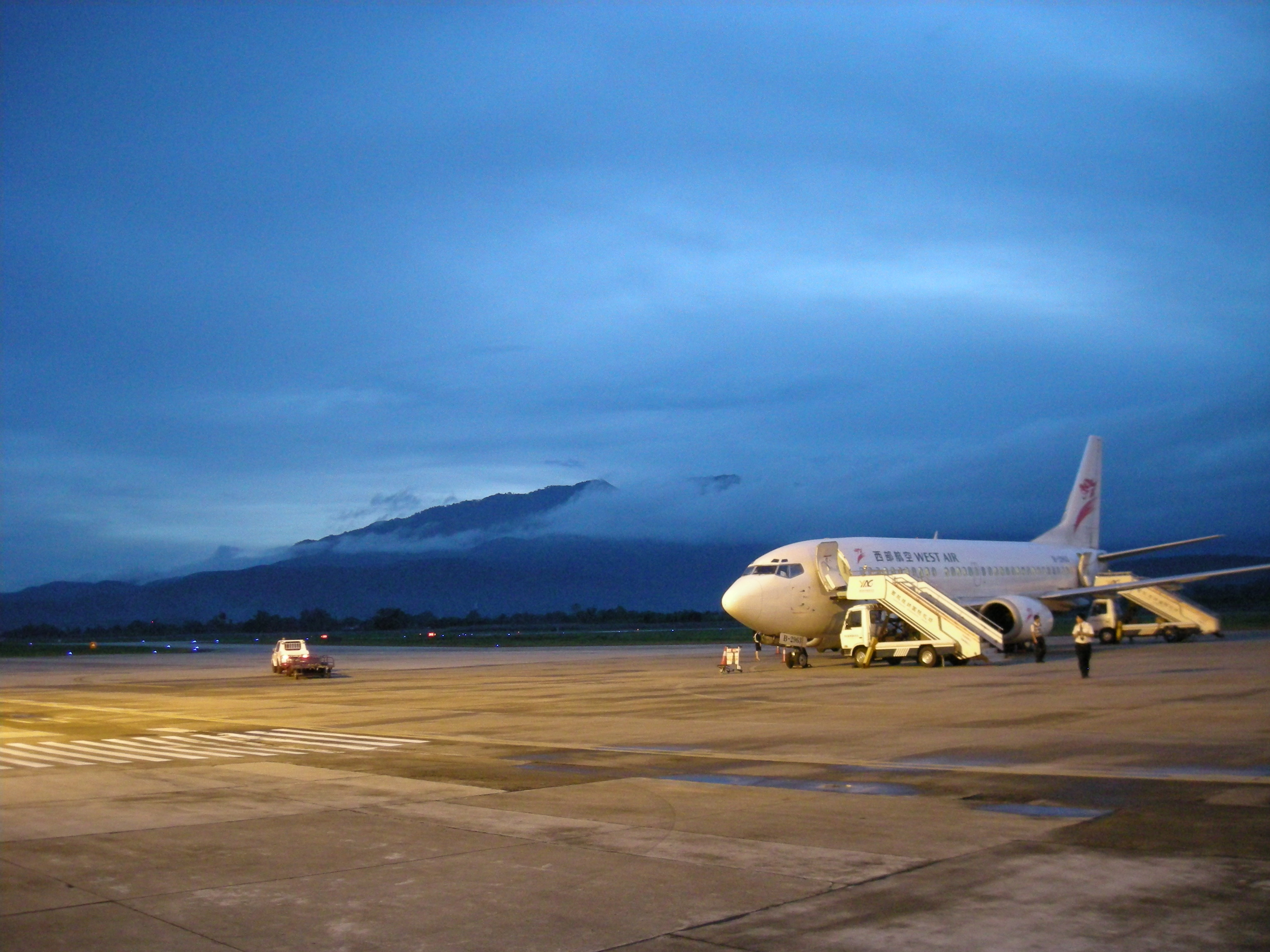
Jinghong Airport

The transport infrastructure of Yunnan is served by numerous transport modes, and forms an integral part of the structure Yunnan Province and the Southwest of China. Yunnan is served by several civilian airports and a major highway and rail network. The province is served by a network of bus routes that radiates from the capital city, Kunming.

Yunnan Province is large geographically and its transport hub is its capital, Kunming (prefecture-level city), which acts as an important gateway, linking China to Southeast Asia, South Asia and the Asia-Pacific region. Most travelers travel by flight or bus. However, railway and river travel is also possible. Train travel requires much more time than air travel.

== History ==
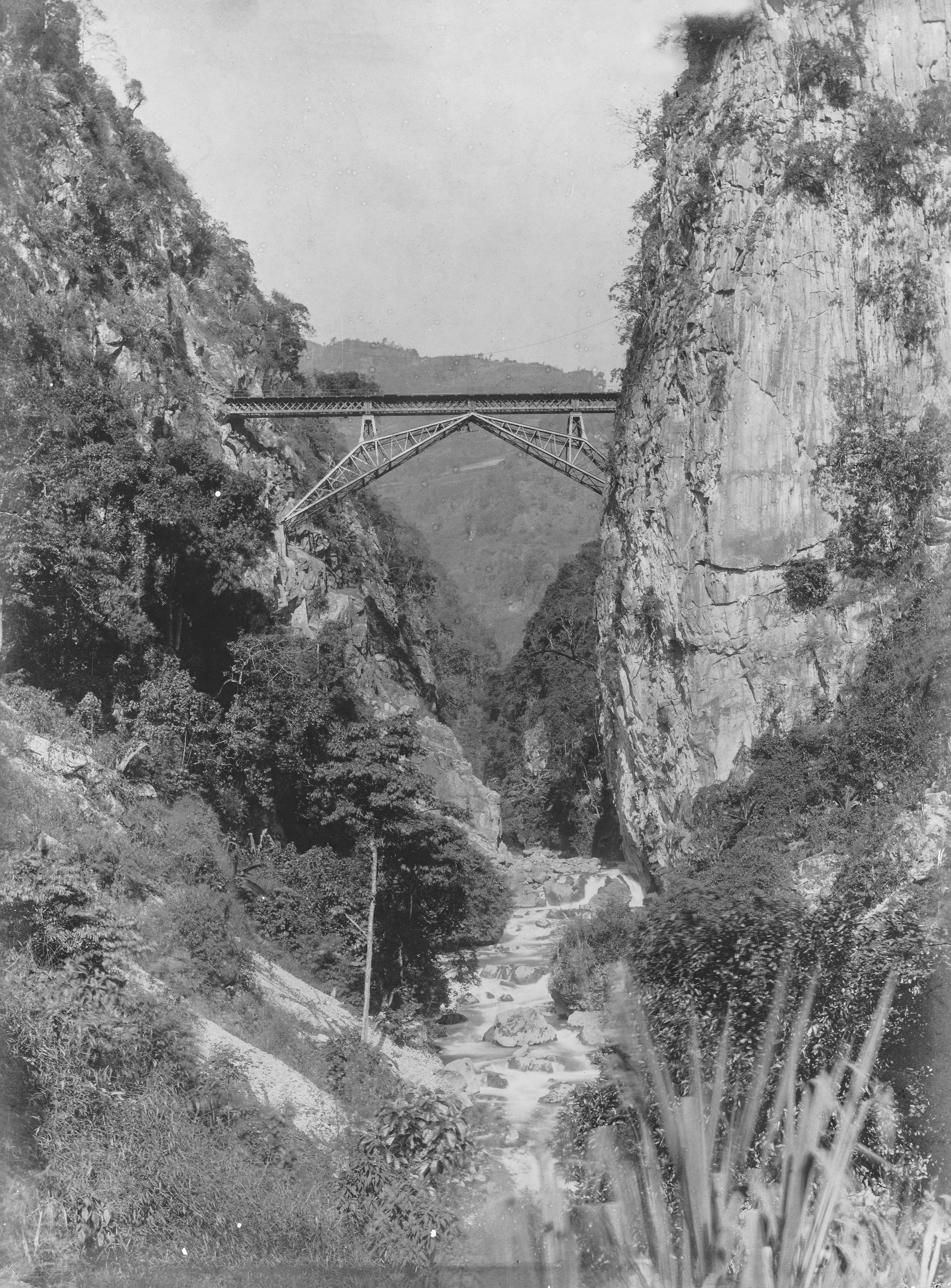
The Faux Namti Bridge on the Yunnan–Vietnam Railway was built by France in 1906.

Yunnan has for much of its history long suffered from poor transport links because of its mountainous, rugged and broken terrain.

Up until World War II Yunnan had only one rail link with the outside world, which was to Vietnam. The 1906–1910 French-built railroad connected the capital Kunming to Hanoi and Haiphong in Vietnam. Since the mid-1950s, railroads have been built to link Kunming with both Guizhou and Sichuan and thus to other parts of China.

It is in the development of highways that Yunnan has made the fastest progress, opening links with neighbouring provinces and achieving a balanced network within the province. Kunming City, Baoshan City, and Pu'er City (to the southwest) form the triangular axis of Yunnan's road system, from which radiate numerous highways. The most famous of these routes is the Burma Road, running from Kunming to Lashio in Myanmar.

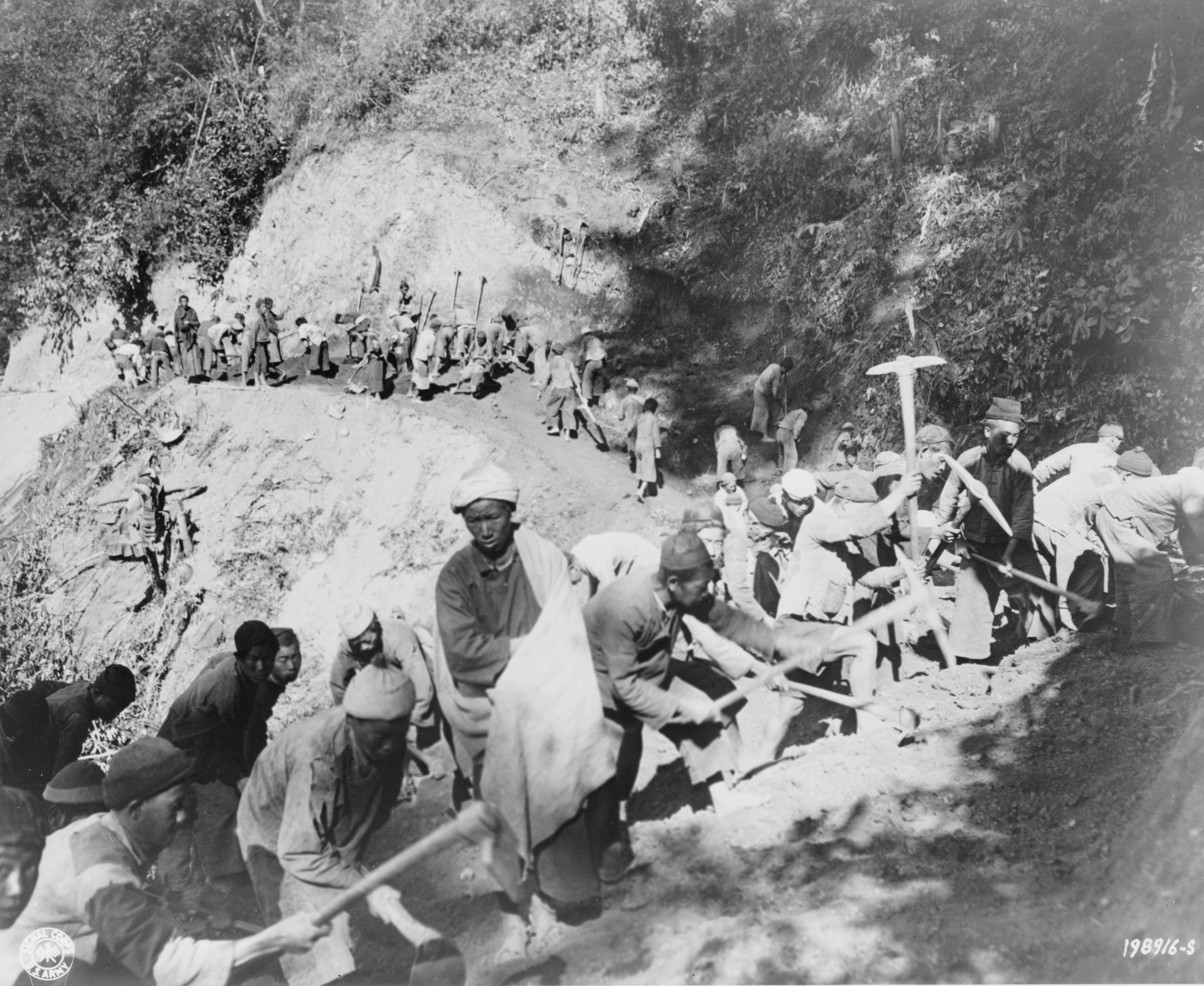
Workers building the Burma Road in Yunnan in 1944

The extensive road development program has produced significant effects. Travel and trade with Guizhou, Guangxi, and Sichuan have increased, and the close links with Tibet and Xinjiang have proved their strategic value. But most important has been the momentum for development and modernization in the remote regions.

Truck transport logistics reaches most villages and towns, making available large quantities of modern equipment tools, fertilizers, and daily necessities to the farmers, while making it possible to ship farm and agricultural products to near or distant markets where they can be sold to the best possible advantage of the producers.

Major road, rail and air transport infrastructure projects in Yunnan and its Southeast Asia are currently underway to further facilitate trade with ASEAN. Some of the more notable projects include a highway linking Kunming with Singapore, a rail network linking Kunming and Singapore via three trunk lines passing through Myanmar, Laos, Thailand, Vietnam, Cambodia and Malaysia, a new international airport in Kunming and an integrated road-rail transport corridor linking Kunming with Haiphong, Vietnam – the closest seaport to Kunming.

== Air ==
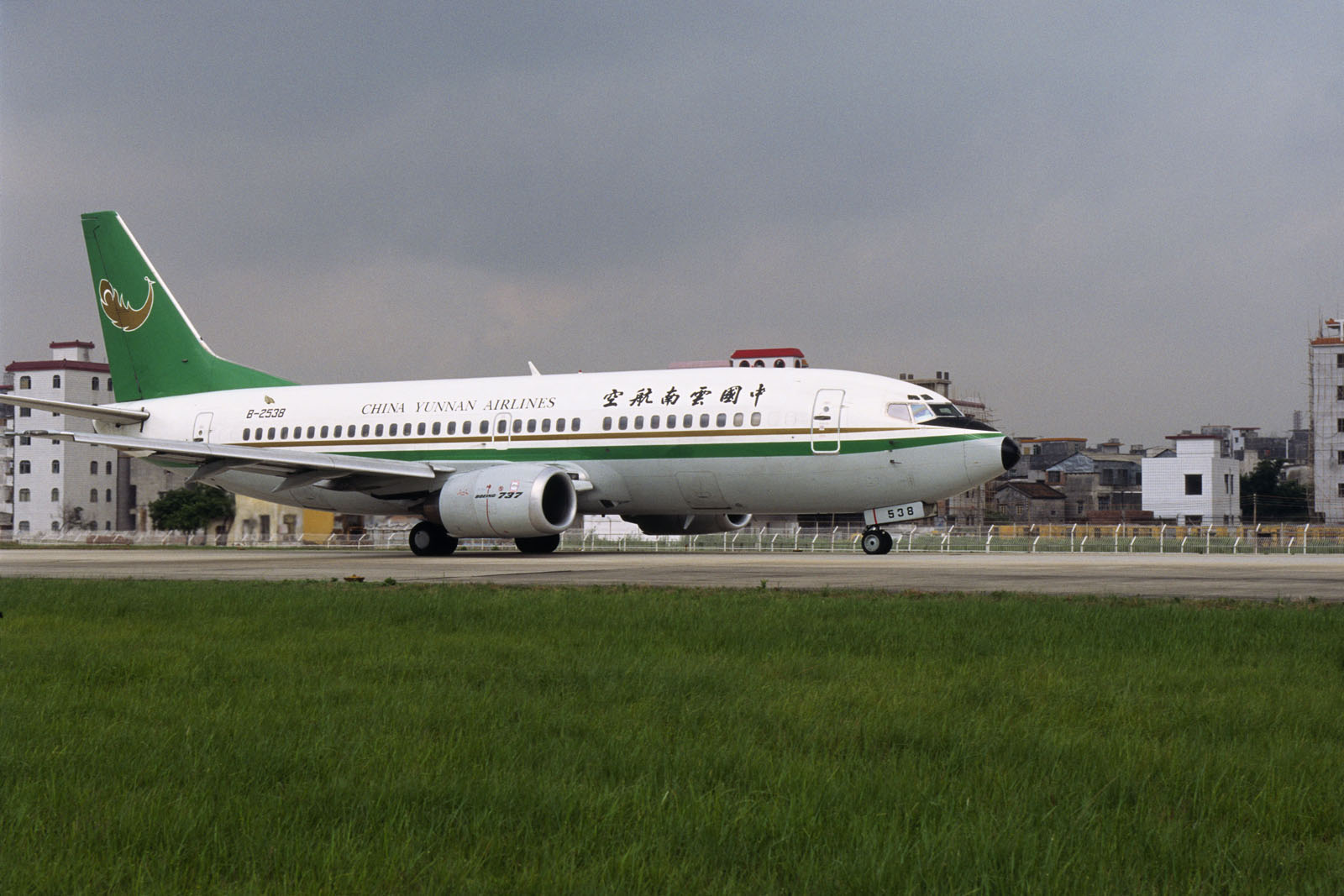
A Yunnan Airlines Boeing 737 aircraft

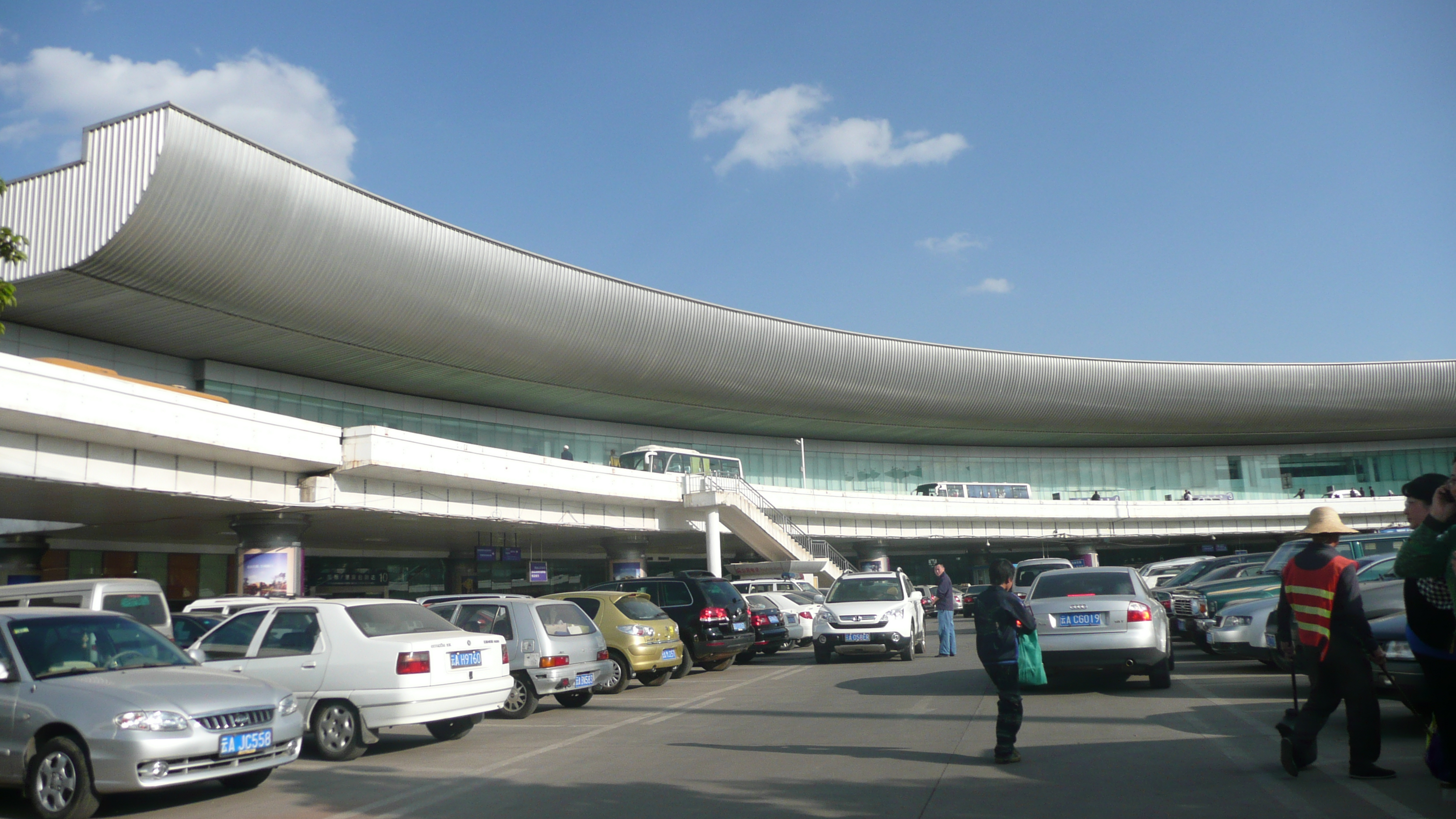
Kunming Airport

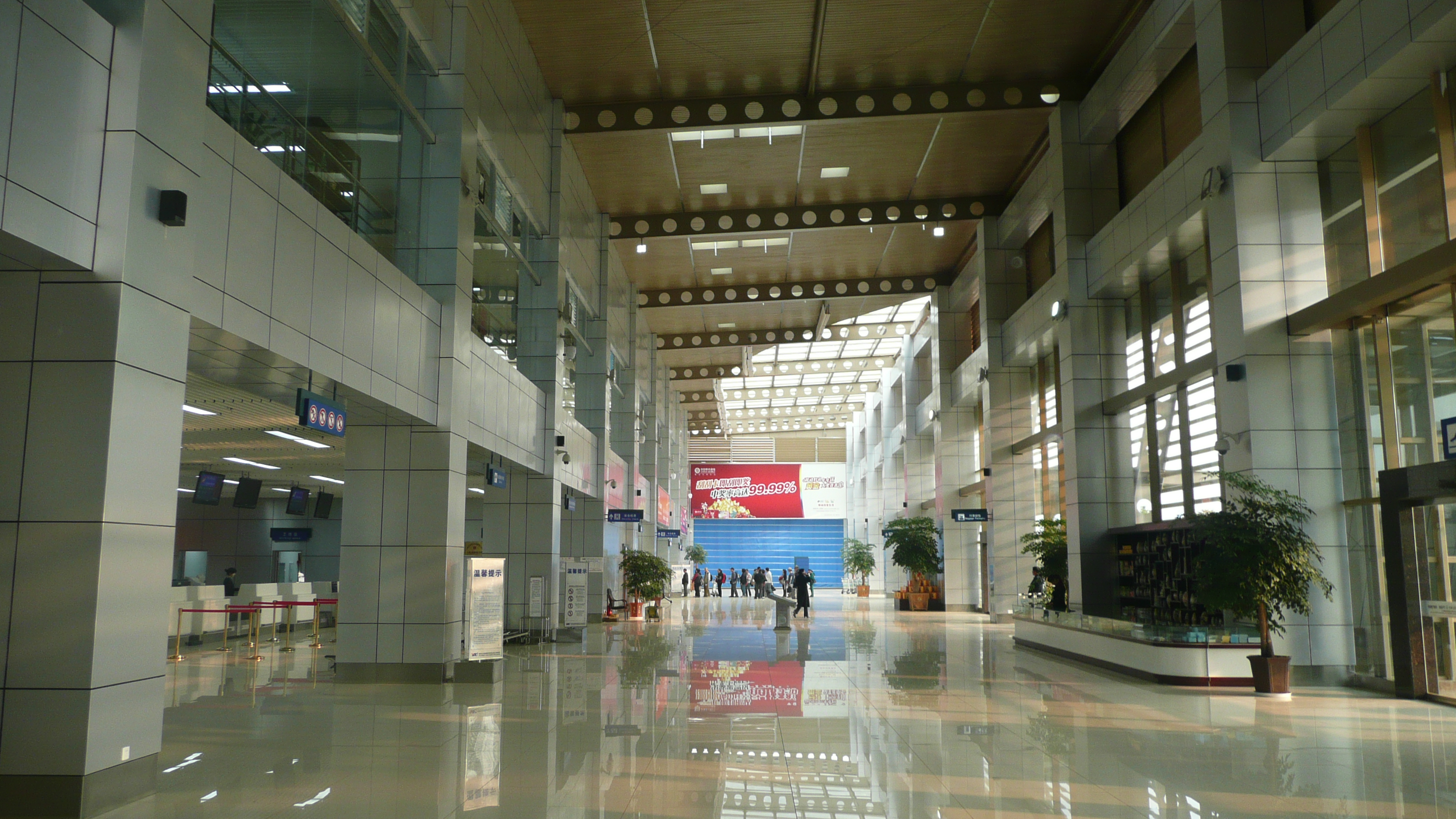
Dali Airport

Yunnan had undergone a speedy development of its civil aviation. Kunming is the hub of both domestic and international services of Air China, China's national airline. Currently, more than 100 domestic and international air routes have been opened leading to different provinces and municipalities of China as well as Hong Kong, Macau, Singapore, Kuala Lumpur, Rangoon, Vientiane, Hanoi, Chiang Mai, Tokyo and Seoul. Yunnan has two international airports, namely Kunming Airport and Xishuangbanna airport.

In the province, there are another 12 feeder airports in Wenshan, Mangshi, Pu'er, Zhaotong, Baoshan, Dali, Lijiang, Diqing, Lincang, Jinghong, Ninglang and Tengchong.

=== Airlines ===
As the transport hub of Yunnan, Kunming Changshui International Airport has opened 224 national lines and 60 international and region lines. There are flights to most of China's major cities including Beijing, Xi'an, Guilin and Shanghai. Domestic lines from Kunming to the scenic spots within the province are fairly developed, now there are lines from Kunming to Simao, Xishuangbanna, Baoshan, Zhaotong, Dali, Mangshi, Lijiang and Zhongdian. International flights to Bangkok, Rangoon, Singapore, Kuala Lumpur and Hong Kong are also available. However, the airport is shut down and being demolished. In addition, eleven domestic air routes and two international routes from Jinghong have been opened.

Kunming: Kunming International Airport is closed. It connected Yunnan with Kolkata (Calcutta), Hong Kong, Rangoon, Vientiane, Singapore, Malaysia. The airport is 5 km south of the city center (Dongfeng Square).

Xishuangbanna: Xishuangbanna International Airport, 4 km from Jinghong City, was designed to accommodate airplanes from Boeing 737 down. 11 domestic air routes from Jinghong have been opened, including Kunming, Beijing, Shanghai, Chengdu, Tianjin, Zhengzhou and Guangxi, and two international routes to Bangkok and Chiang Mai in Thailand.

== Road ==
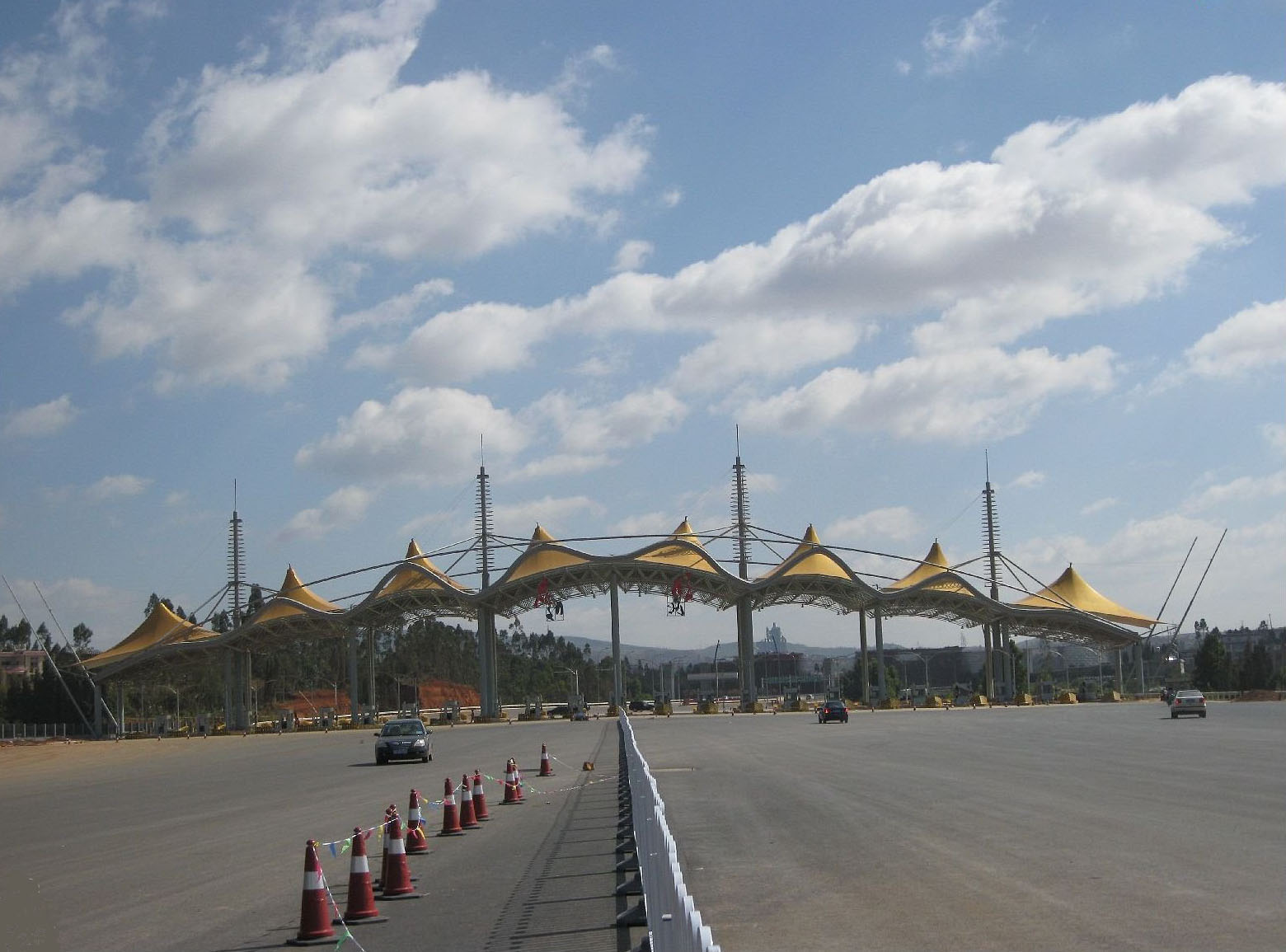
Toll plaza on expressway near Kunming

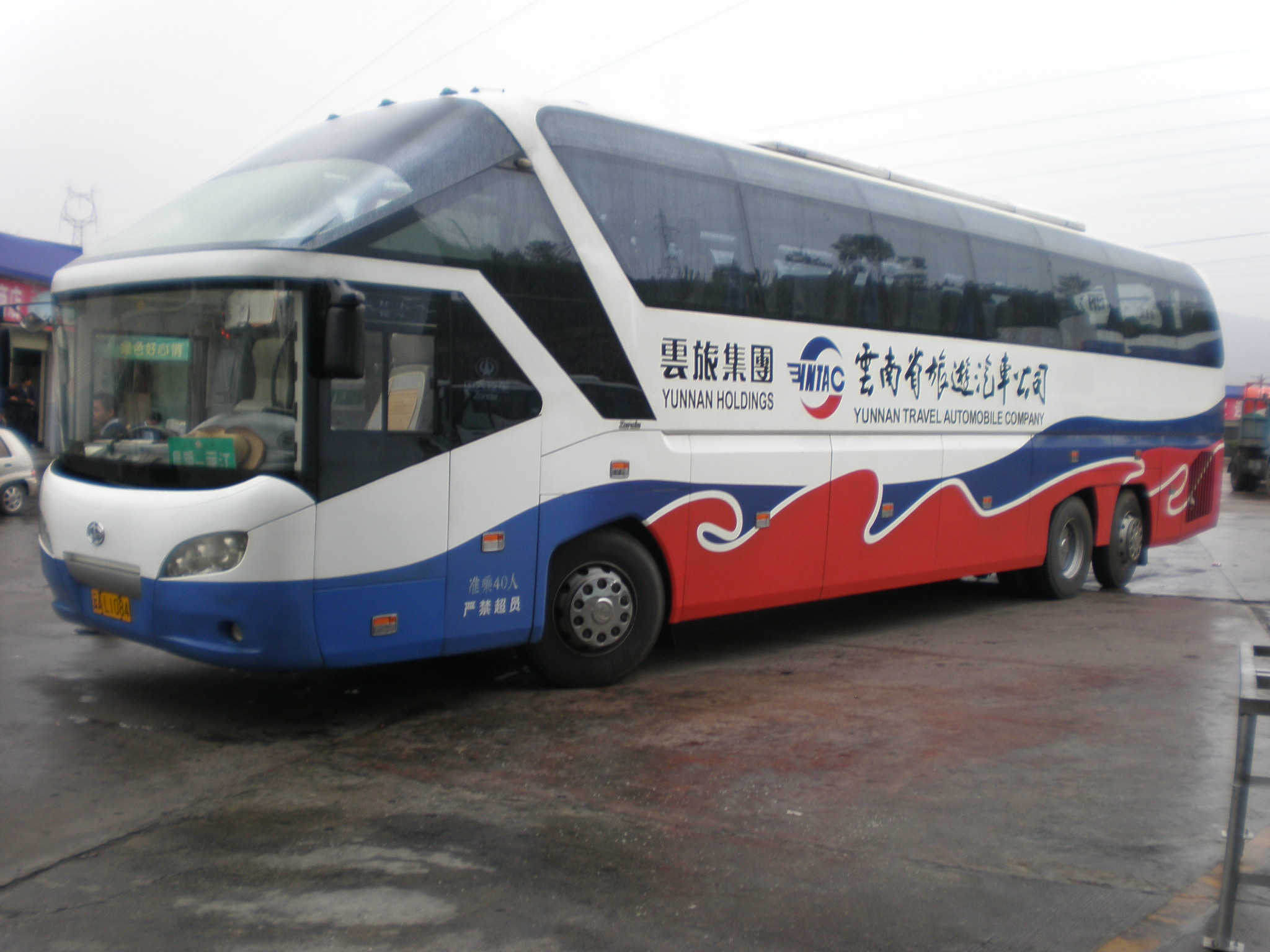
A tour bus that plies the Kunming-Lijiang route.

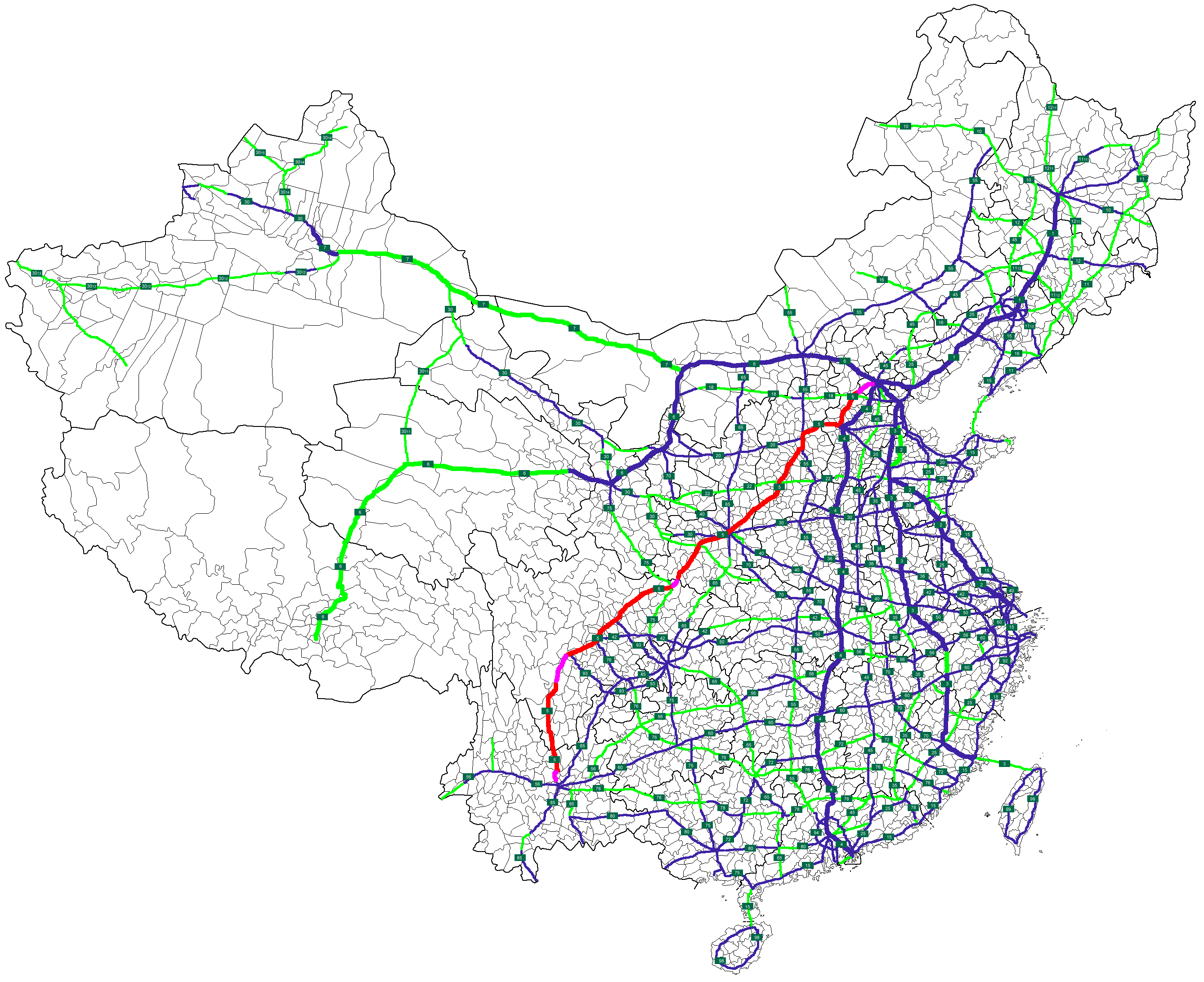
Map of China's expressway network

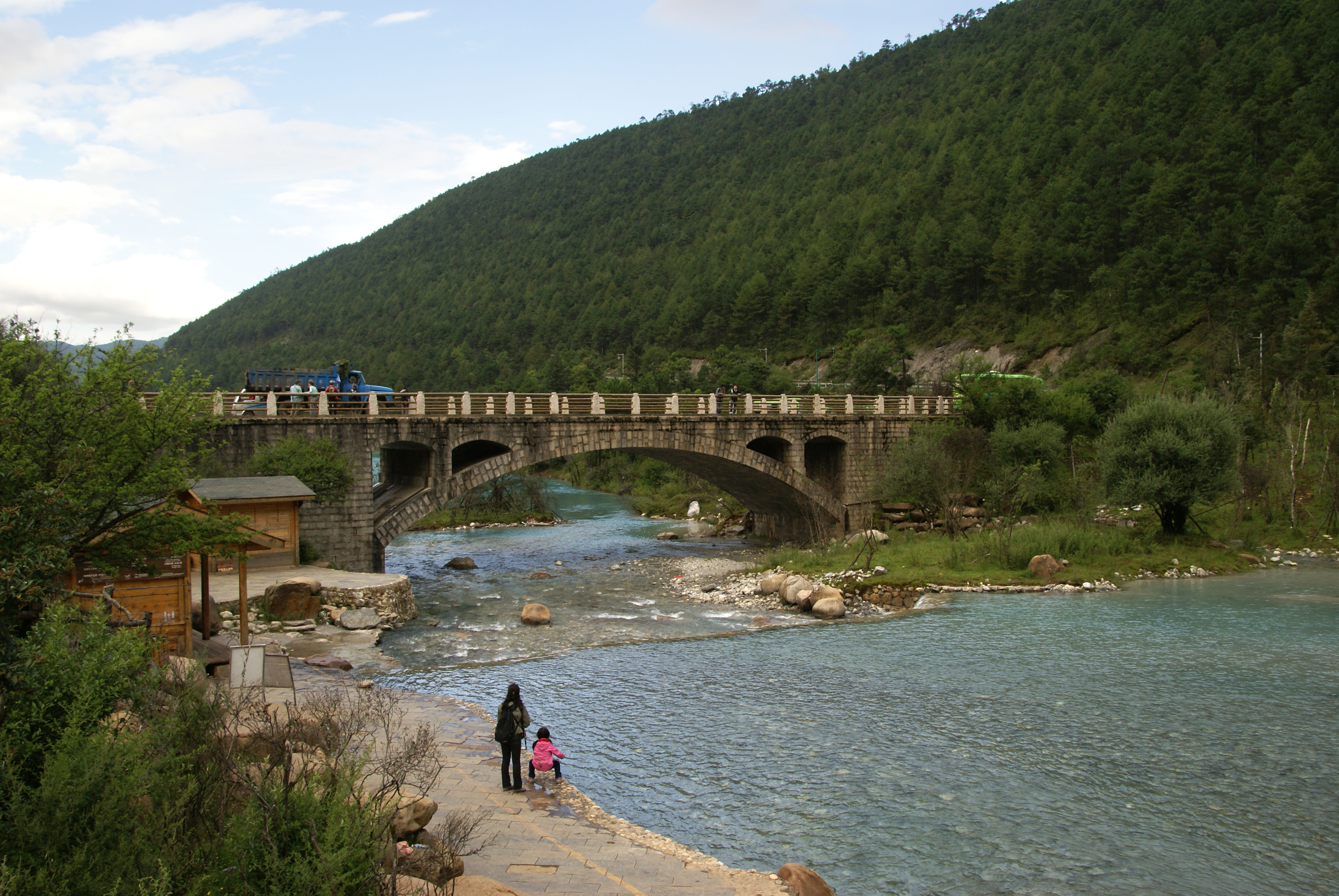
Rural roadway in Lijiang.

Yunnan has a developed road network centered at Kunming City. The highway network connects with the network of neighboring provinces such as Sichuan, Guizhou, Guangxi and Tibet as well as the neighboring countries such as Myanmar, Laos, Vietnam and Thailand. Over a decade ago, the mileage of Yunnan highways has reached 65,800 km, second only to Sichuan Province in China, among which there are 7 national highway lines, 6,081 km; 61 provincial lines, 8,971 km; county - level highway lines, 30,950 km and country roads, 19,757 km, and now highways lead to every township. Ten thousand length of highway in Kunming link Yunnan with other provinces and other countries. In the year of 2002, Yunnan had the highest high traffic mileages among all provinces in China. 1,570 towns in Yunnan can now be accessed via highway.

=== Coverage ===
Today, Yunnan has a total length of 167,000 km. The length of high-grade highways above Grade 2 adds up to more than 3,400 km and that of expressways amounted to nearly 1,300 km. To date, with Kunming at the nerve center and inter-provincial and intra-provincial roads as the backbone, Yunnan's highway network has stretched to cover all townships and 98 percent of the villages in the province. It is interconnected with the road network of its neighboring provinces of Sichuan, Guizhou, Guangxi, and Tibet and with the neighboring countries of Myanmar, Laos, Vietnam, and Thailand. Yunnan is planning to focus on the upgrading and expansion of 6 trunk roads leading to other provinces and neighboring countries with the objective of turning them into a highway network.

=== National roads ===
7 National Roads (National Road 108, 213, 214, 320, 321, 323 and 326) and 61 provincial roads radiate from Kunming to major cities in Yunnan and other provinces or even abroad.

National Road 108: From Panzhihua of Sichuan into Yunnan, cross Yongren, Yuanmou and Wuding to Kunming, it covering 278 km.

National Road 213: From Yibin of Sichuan to Yunnan, cross Zhaotong, Kunming, Yuxi and Simao to Xishuangbanna, it covering 1,581 km. Now this road has been built to Simao and will soon to Jinghong. It will pass Laos and finally get to Bangkok of Thailand, which will become a more convenient passage to ASEAN (Association of Southeast Asian Nations).

National Road 214: National Road 214 crosses Yunnan from the south to the north, via Xishuangbanna, Lincang, Dali, Lijiang, Diqing to Tibet, covering 1,418 km. And expressway has been built from Dali to Lijiang.

National Road 320: National Road 320 cross Yunnan from the east to the west, via Qujing, Kunming, Chuxiong, Dali, Baoshan, Luxi to Ruili on the China-Myanmar border, covering 1,030 km. And the part of Qujing-Kunming-Dali is expressway.

National Road 323: From Baise of Guangxi into Yunnan, cross Yanshan, Kaiyuan, Jianshui, Yuanjiang, Pu'er to Lincang, it covering 928 km.

=== Expansion ===
Yunnan Province will mainly build and extend three traffic lines to connect China with to South Asia and Southeast Asia. This was part of the economic coordination of southwest China's six provinces, regions and municipalities (Sichuan, Yunnan, Guizhou, Tibet, Guangxi and Chongqing). The three lines include: the western line along Yunnan-Myanmar (Kunming-Wanding Town) Highway, China-India (Stillwell Road) Highway and Guangtong-Dali Railway to Myanmar, India and Bangladesh; the central line from Lancang-Mekong River shipping line, Kunming-Daluo Highway and the Xishuangbanna International Airport, to Laos, Myanmar, Thailand and further Singapore; and the eastern line to Vietnam based on Yunnan-Vietnam Railway, Kunming-Hekou Highway and the Honghe River shipping line, which is to be developed.

== Rail ==
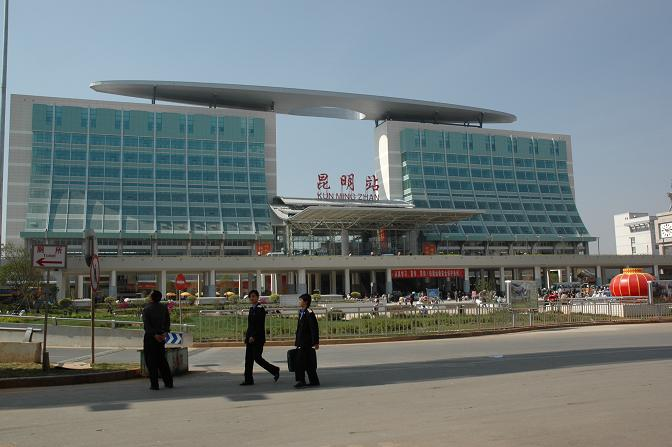
Kunming is the main rail hub in Yunnan. Railways from Chengdu, Neijiang, Guiyang, and Nanning in neighboring provinces, Yuxi and Dali from within Yunnan and Hanoi from Vietnam converge in Kunming.

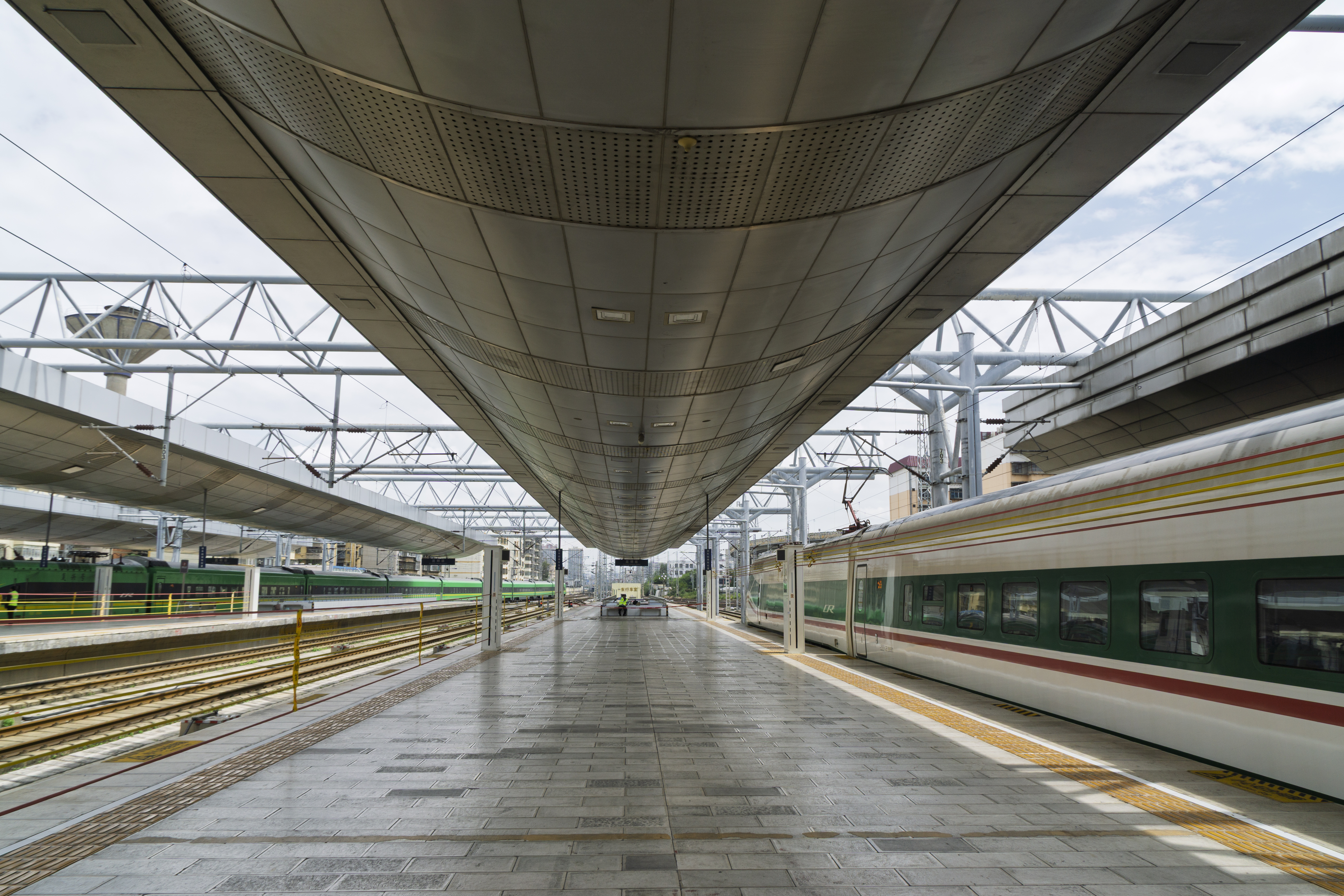
Platforms of the Kunming Railway Station

The first railway in Yunnan, the Kunming–Hanoi Railway (Sino-Vietnamese Railway), dates back to 1910. In 1941, American-supported construction began on the English Yunnan–Burma Railway, but this was aborted due to Japanese advances. The building of railways in Yunnan is difficult due to rugged terrain locally and in neighboring provinces. The rugged terrains requires rail lines to have extensive bridges and tunnels which adds to construction cost. Yunnan is one of the poorest provinces in China and the construction of railways is capital intensive. After the founding of the People's Republic of China in 1949, Yunnan Province has experienced two periods of railway construction—from the late 1950s to the mid-1970s and from the mid-1990s to the present, which have connected the province with the national rail network and expanded the provincial rail network. At present, railways in operation in Yunnan include:

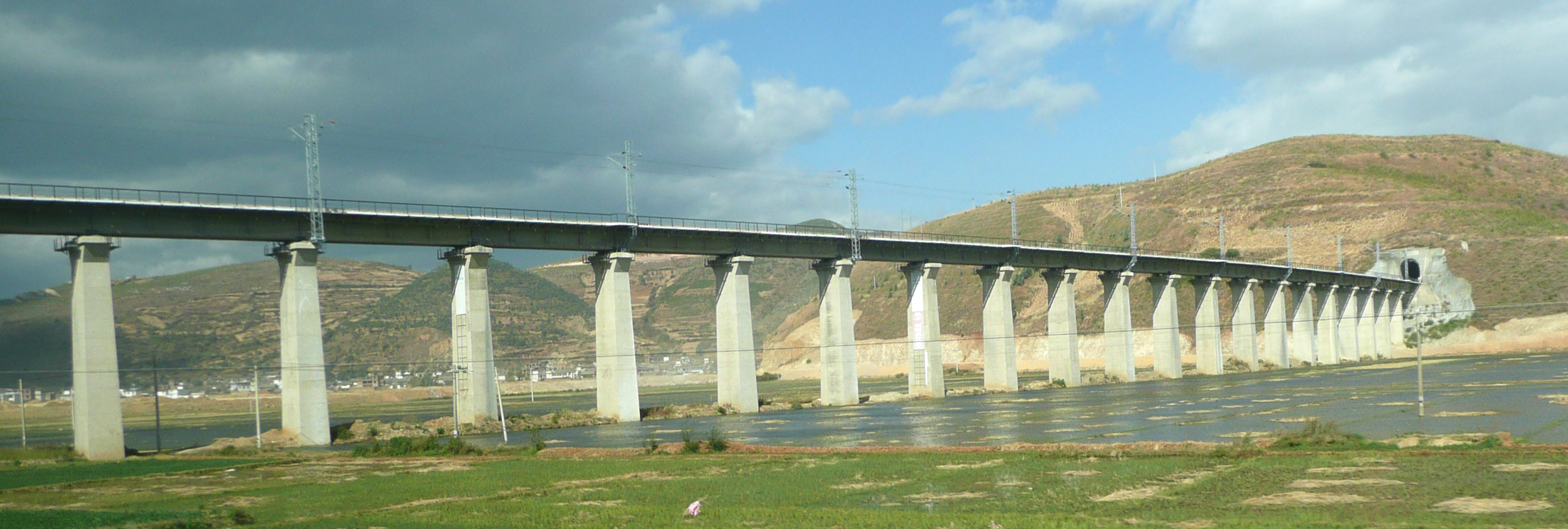
The Dali-Lijiang Railway opened in 2009, is one of the newest railways in Yunnan. Pictured, a viaduct on the Da-Li line near Lijiang.

- Yunnan–Vietnam Railway 855 km (531 mi) including 466 km (290 mi) in Yunnan, completed in 1910
- Guiyang–Kunming Railway 640 km (398 mi), completed in 1966
- Chengdu–Kunming Railway 1,134 km (705 mi), completed in 1970
- Nanning–Kunming Railway 898.7 km (558 mi), completed in 1997
- Neijiang–Kunming Railway 872 km (542 mi), completed in parts in 1960, 1965 and 2001
- Pan County West Railway 136.3 km (85 mi), completed in part in 1975
- Kunming–Hekou line, consisting of the following sections:
  - Kunming–Yuxi Railway 55.5 km (34 mi), completed in 1993
  - Yuxi–Mengzi Railway 141 km (88 mi), completed in 2013
  - Mengzi–Hekou Railway 140 km (87 mi), completed in 2014
- Guangtong–Dali Railway 213 km (132 mi), completed in 1998
- Dali–Lijiang Railway 165 km (103 mi), completed in 2009
- Lijiang–Shangri-La Railway 139.7 km (87 mi) completed in 2023

The current network is centered around Kunming and most extensive in eastern Yunnan with outlets to Guizhou and on to the Yangtze River valley and Guangxi and on to the South China coast.

Since the late 1990s, the railway network in Yunnan has undergone considerable track upgrade and electrification to boost carrying capacity. Expansion projects include:

- Guangtong to Dali electrification

=== High-speed rail ===
Several high-speed rail projects have been planned for Yunnan. The high-speed Shanghai–Kunming Passenger Dedicated Line shortened the travel time between Shanghai and Kunming from 37 hours to less than nine hours. This line follows the same route as the existing Shanghai–Kunming Railway from Shanghai on the East China Sea to Kunming via Zhejiang, Jiangxi, Hunan, Guizhou and Yunnan province, passing through the major cities of Hangzhou, Nanchang and Changsha. The cross-country line is part of a nationwide rail upgrade that has allocated 500 million yuan (US$73.2 million) in funds for Yunnan province alone. The original target speed of 350 km/h for the line is faster than that of France's TGV and Japan's Shinkansen which currently operate at 320 and 300 km/h, respectively. In the wake of the Wenzhou high-speed train collision on July 23, 2011, however, the China's Ministry of Railways has lowered the speeds of nearly all high-speed lines in operations and under construction.

=== International rail connections ===
Yunnan province is also expanding the provincial rail network to neighboring Southeast Asian countries. In the east, the Yuxi–Mengzi Railway (141 km (88 mi)), under construction since 2005, and the Mengzi–Hekou Railway (140 km (87 mi)), was under construction since 2008, and completed in 2014 forming a standard gauge railway connection with Vietnam. In the west, the Dali–Ruili Railway (336.387 km (209 mi)), under construction since May 2011, is expected to extend rail service to the border with Myanmar. In the center, under planning is a rail line from Yuxi to Mohan, in Xishuangbanna Dai Autonomous Prefecture, on the border with Laos. This line could be extended further south to Thailand, Malaysia and Singapore.

== Water ==
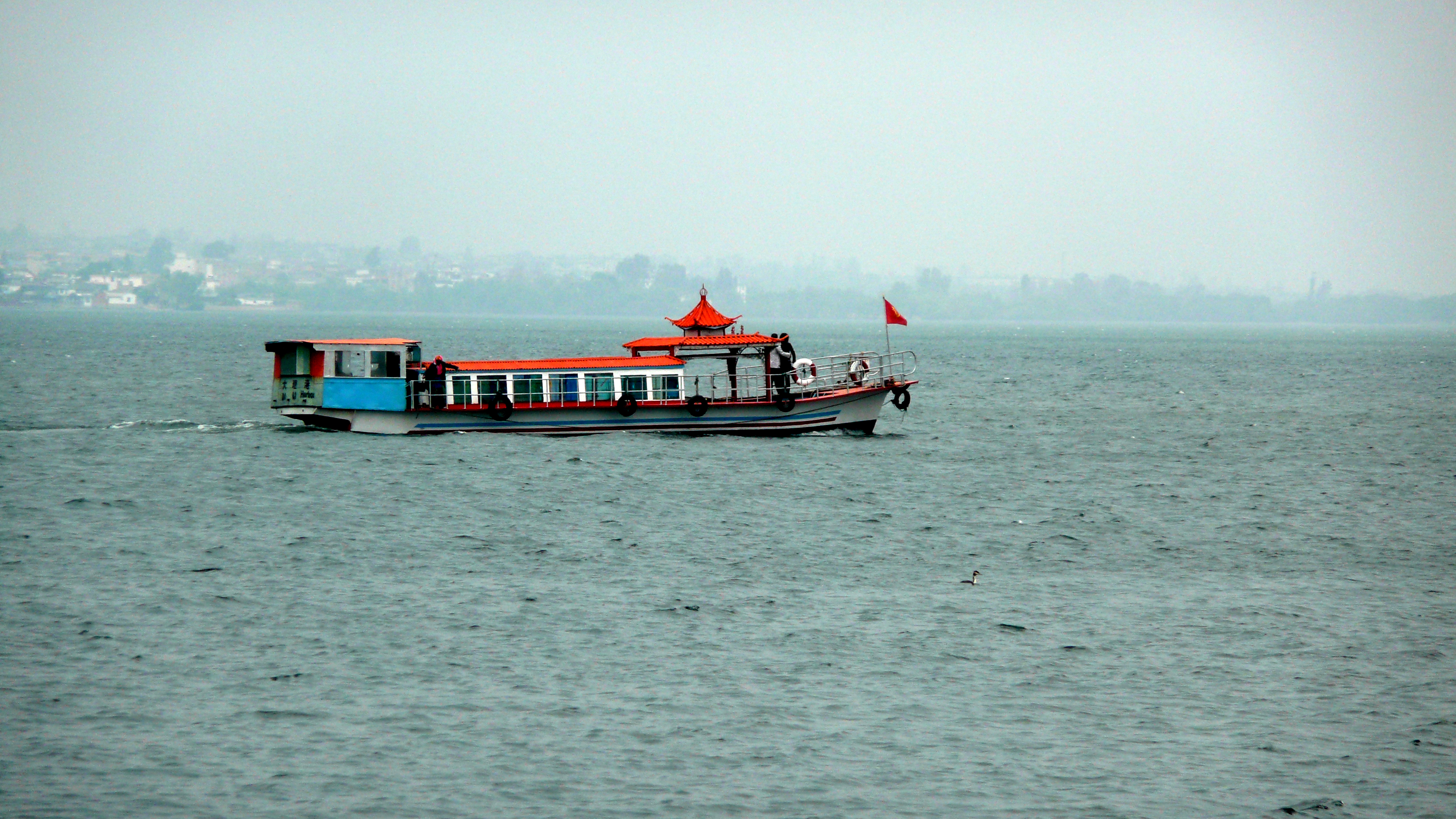
Boat on the Erhai

=== Rivers ===
There are six main water connections in Yunnan:

- Jinsha River (Yangtze River)
- Lancang River (Mekong River)
- Nu River (Salween River)
- Irrawaddy River
- Pearl River
- Honghe River (Red River)

A total of 8,000 km of waterways can be used for river transport purpose. At present, along the Jinsha River and the Lancang River, the length of intra-province waterways in operation approximates 1,500 km. Major ports include Guanlei, Shuifu, Suijiang, Jinghong, Simao, and Dali. In June 2001, commercial shipping service among China, Laos, Myanmar, and Thailand on the Lancang-Mekong River was officially inaugurated.

=== River ports ===
Jinghong, Guanlei and Simao District river ports are open to the outside world. Many rivers open for commercial international trade with neighboring countries. Lancang River (known as the Mekong in its lower reaches) is the only international river linking 6 countries in Asia.

Most of the rivers in Yunnan are unnavigable, except for short distances or in broken stretches. Boats travel between towns on the shores of Erhai Lake, but they are unable to sail beyond there to connect with other waterways.

=== Lakes ===
There are also lakes of various sizes in Yunnan such as Dianchi Lake, Erhai Lake and Fuxian Lake. Fuxian Lake forbids motor boats.

=== Seaports ===
There are no seaports in Yunnan, as the province is landlocked, however water transport to peninsular Southeast Asia, via the Mekong river is available from Jinghong, as stated above.

== Future projects ==
As well as improvements of the connections between international locations and Yunnan, the province is also seeing internal transport developments. In the east of Yunnan, Yuxi to Mengzi railway is under construction, along with railway connections between Mengzi and Hekou. In the west of the province, a railway from Dali to Ruili (next to Myanmar) is being built.

=== Road ===
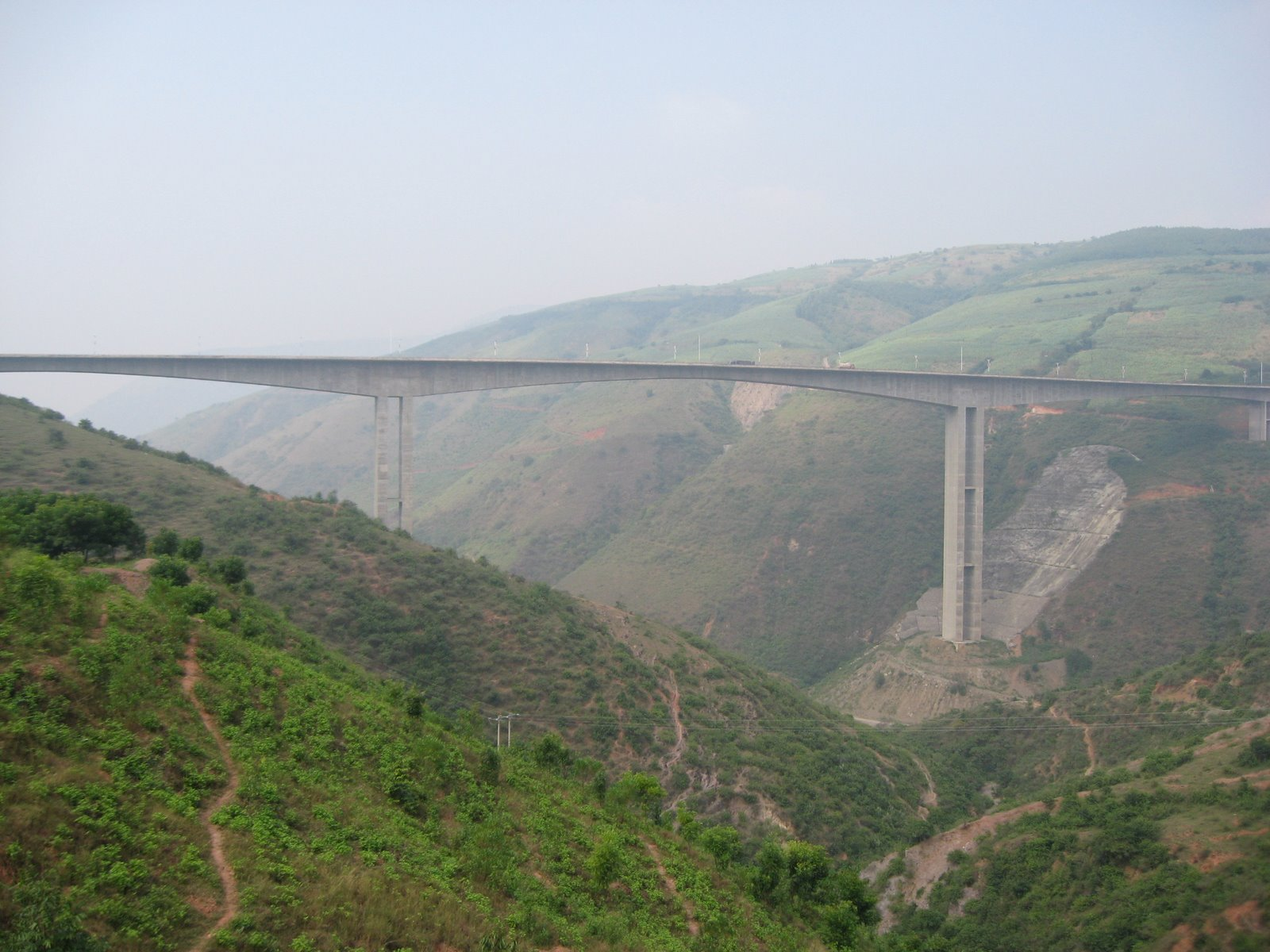
Road bridge in Honghe

Yunnan's government announced in 2004 a strategic program for the construction of a new "Europe-Asia Continental Bridge" that would link China to Europe. A railroad starting from China's east coastal city Shenzhen will run through Yunnan to Burma, Bangladesh, India, Pakistan, Iran, Turkey and finally through to Europe.

=== Rail ===
A "Pan-Asia Railroad" is to be finished by 2015. This railroad will start from Singapore, through to Kuala Lumpur, Bangkok, Phnom Penh, to Loc Nink, Lao Cai in Vietnam, terminating in Kunming.

=== Bridge ===
Another project underway is a new bridge over the Mekong River to connect Chiangkhong in Thailand and Ban Houayxay in Laos, to the Kunming-Bangkok Highway, complementing the highway through the Mekong River Region. The bridge is completed as of 2014.

== Logistics ==
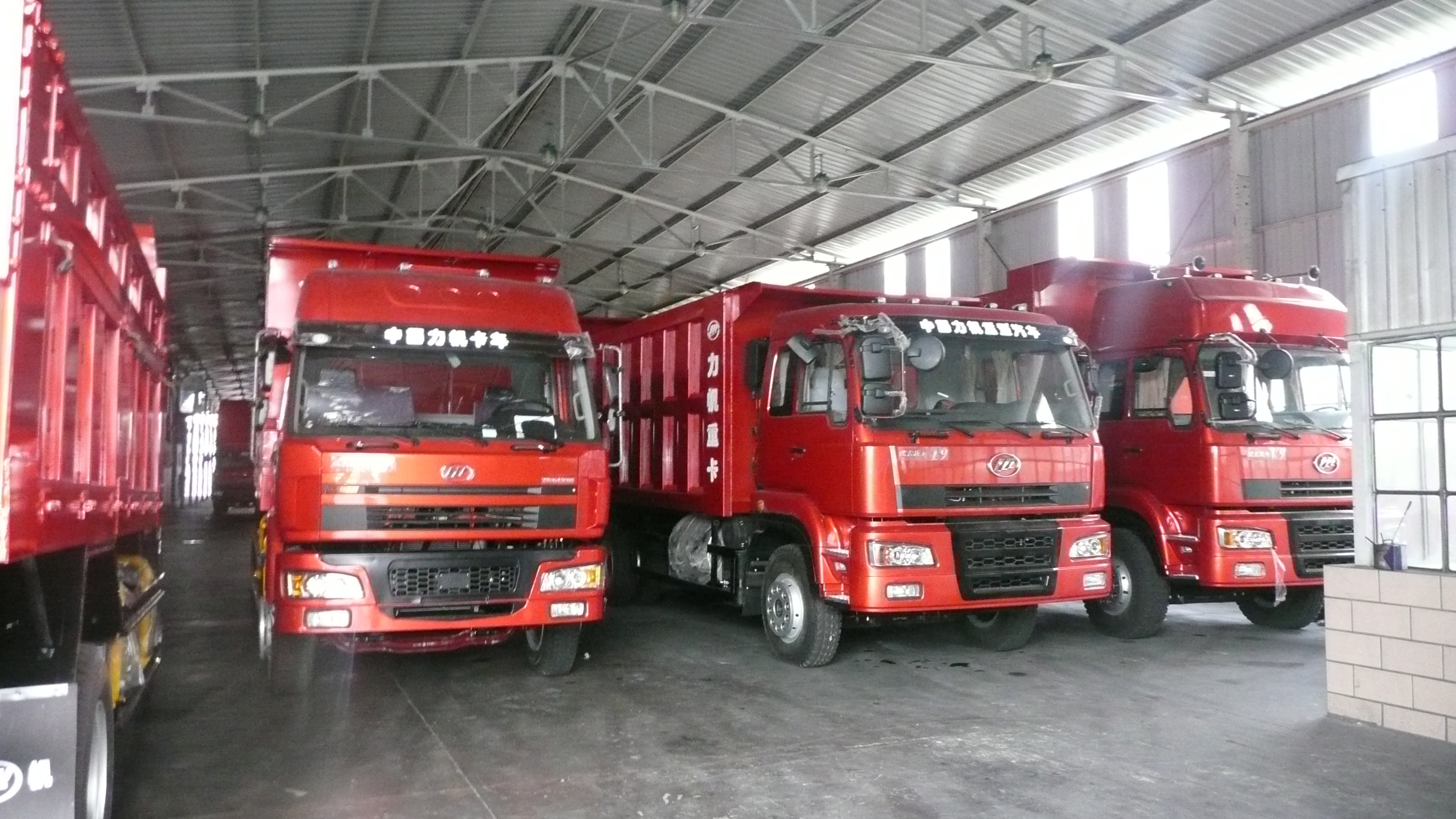
Lifan Trucks of the Yunnan Lifan Junma Vehicle Co., Ltd., in Dali

One of the fastest growing sectors in Yunnan is the logistics industry. Yunnan's international and domestic trade continues to grow and the demand for logistics services has increased rapidly.

=== Cargo lines ===
Yunnan port administration office

There are 13 cargo transport lines between Yunnan and Laos:

- Kunming to Vientiane
- Simao to Vientiane
- Jinghong to Vientiane
- Kunming to Lang Prabang
- Mengla to Houayxay
- Mengla to Munsey
- Mengla to Phongsali
- Mengla to Nam Tha
- Mengla to Mengxing

There are 3 lines between Yunnan and Vietnam:

- Gejiu to Van Ban
- Gejiu to Sabah Vietnam
- Mengzi to Van Ban

== Organizations ==
Important organizations include:

- Chartered Institute of Logistics & Transport–China
- Greater Mekong Subregional Logistics Research Center, China
- Yunnan Federation of Logistics and Purchasing
- Yunnan Road and Transportation Association
- Yunnan Transportation Association
- Yunnan Modern Logistics Association
- China-ASEAN International Agriculture Products Trade Net
- Yunnan Logistics Industry Group

== See also ==
- Asian Highway Network
- American Volunteer Group / Flying Tigers / China National Aviation Corporation (the roots of aviation in Yunnan)
