= Hekou North railway station =

Railway station in Yunnan, China

Coordinates: 22.532257°N 103.973857°E

Hekou North 河口北站
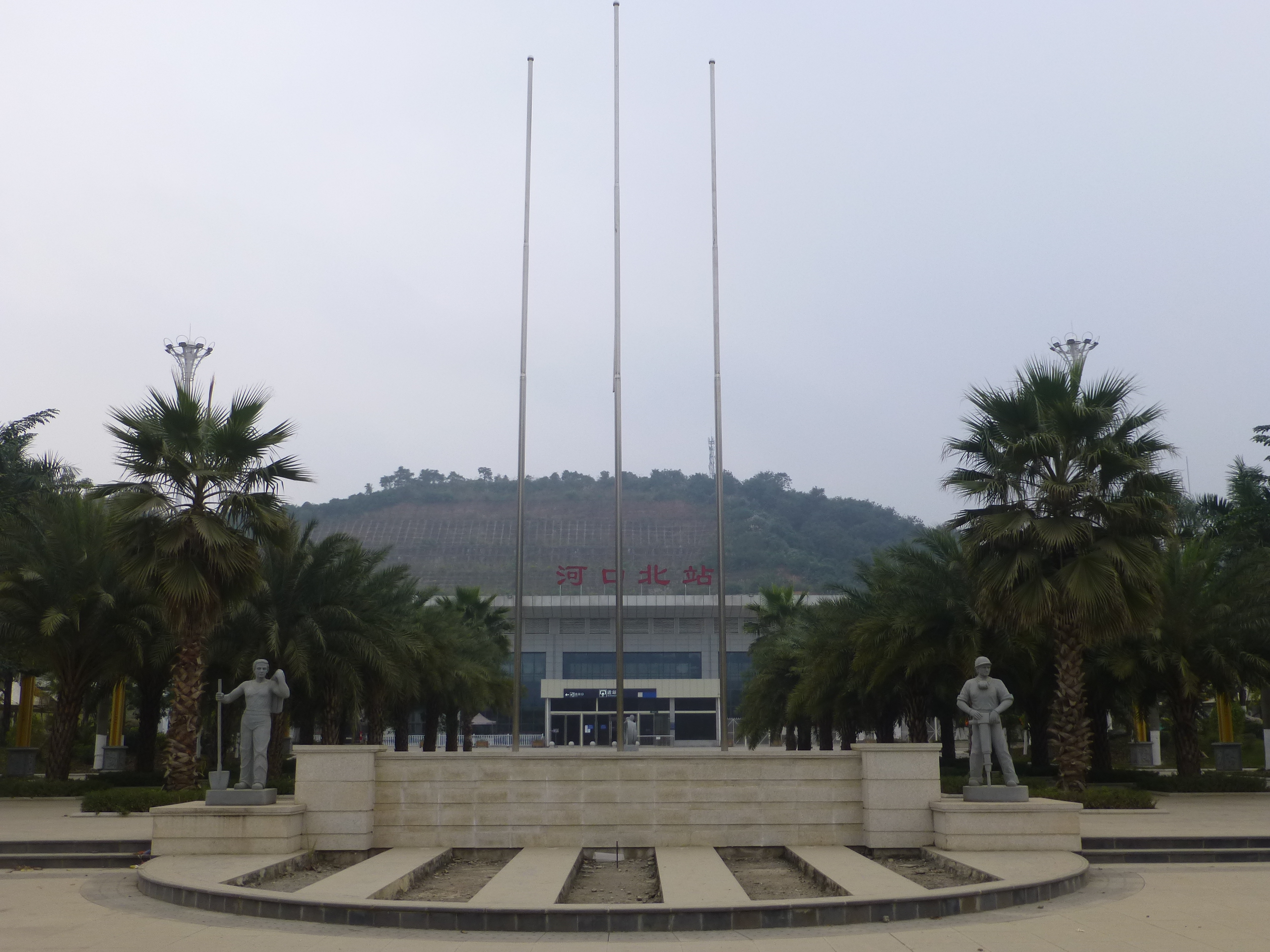
- The new Hekou North Railway Station, on the standard-gauge Kunming–Yuxi–Hekou railway

General information
- Location: Hekou Yao Autonomous County; Honghe Hani and Yi Autonomous Prefecture, Yunnan; China
- Owner: China Railway
- Operator: China Railway Kunming Group
- Manager: Ministry of Transport
- Lines: Kunming–Yuxi–Hekou railway; Kunming–Haiphong railway
- Platforms: 4
- Tracks: 13

Construction
- Structure type: At-grade
- Parking: Yes

Other information
- Station code: 48615

History
- Opened: 1 December 2014

Services
Preceding station	China Railway	Following station
Madubai towards Kunming South	Kunming–Yuxi–Hekou railway	Hekou Terminus
Location

Hekou North railway station (Chinese: 河口北站; pinyin: Hékǒu běi zhàn) is a railway station in Hekou Town, the county seat of Hekou Yao Autonomous County in Yunnan Province of China. It is the southern end of the standard-gauge Kunming–Yuxi–Hekou Railway. It also is connected by meter-gauge tracks to the meter-gauge Kunming–Hekou railway (the Chinese section of the international Kunming–Hai Phong railway), thus serving as a linking point between Vietnam's meter-gauge rail network and China's standard-gauge network.

The station serves cargo trains from both the standard-gauge and narrow-gauge sides. Passenger service exists only on the standard-gauge side, and consists of several daily trains to Kunming, one of them continuing to Dali.

== History ==
Hekou North railway station was opened on December 1, 2014, along with the Mengzi–Hekou railway, the last and southernmost segment of the Kunming–Yuxi–Hekou mainline. On March 27, 2015, the short meter-gauge connector line connecting Hekou North railway station with the Kunming–Hai Phong railway (linking into it near the old Hekou railway station) was opened as well, making Hekou North a junction point between two differently gauged railway systems. Soon, the facilities for transferring shipping containers and entire railcars between the two systems came on line as well. The two facilities were inaugurated with transferring two containers of coke on April 10, and 16 cars of chemical fertilizers on April 12, respectively.
