= Kunming–Yuxi–Hekou railway =

Railway line in Yunnan, China

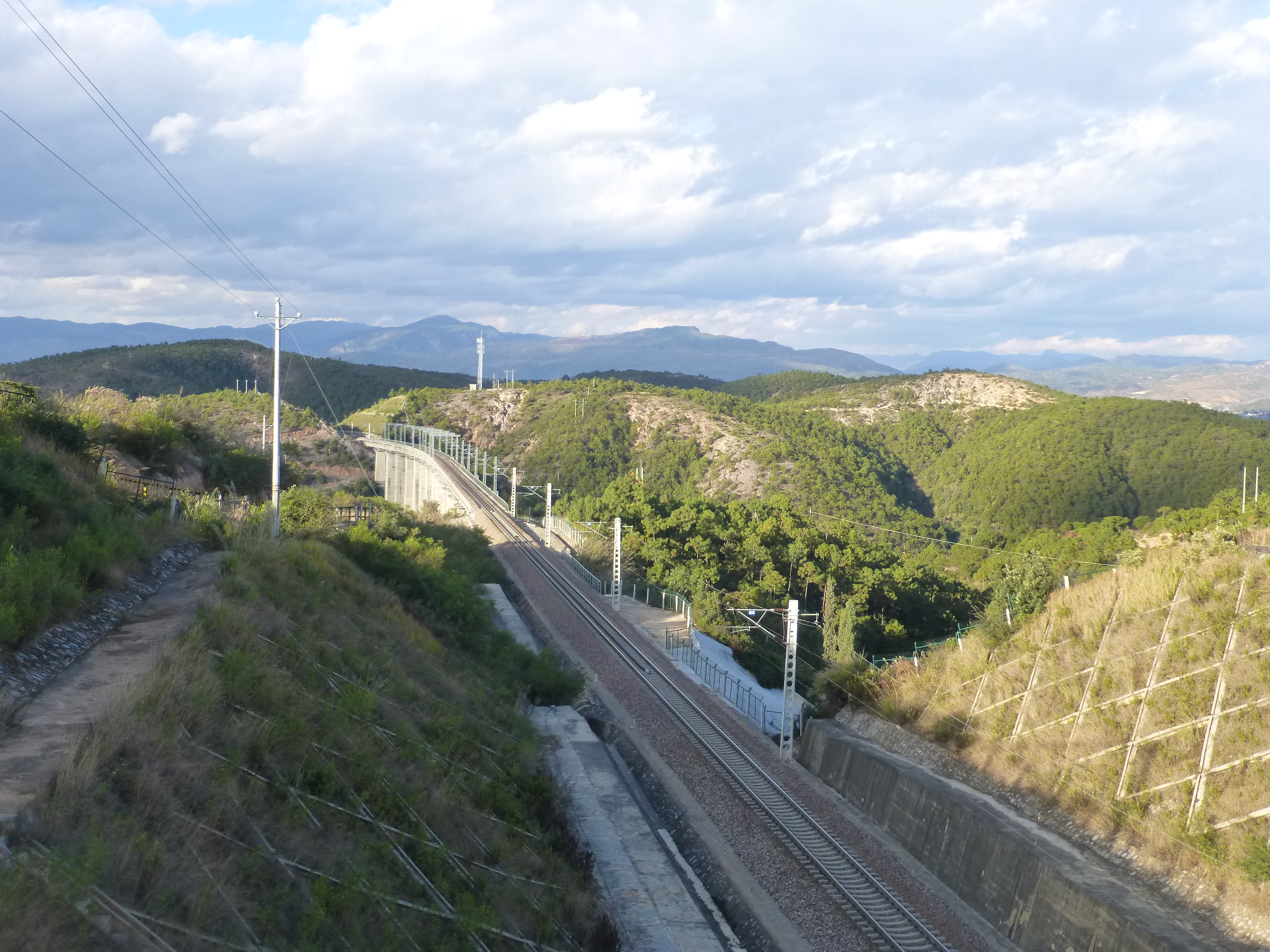
- A railway section in Jianshui County, north of Lihaozhai.

Overview
- Other name: Kunming–Yuxi railway
- Status: Operational
- Owner: China Railway
- Locale: Yunnan Province
- Termini: Kunming South railway station; Hekou North railway station
- Continues as: Yuxi–Mohan railway; Hanoi–Lào Cai railway
- Stations: 41

Service
- Type: Inter-city rail; Freight rail
- Operator(s): China Railway Kunming Group
- Rolling stock: CRH2, CR200J, HXD3C, HXD3D

History
- Opened: December 1993
- Last extension: 1 December 2014
- Upgraded: 29 December 2016

Technical
- Line length: 388 km (241 mi)
- Number of tracks: 2–1
- Track gauge: 1,435 mm (4 ft 8 1/2 in) standard gauge
- Electrification: 25 kV 50 Hz AC overhead line
- Operating speed: Kunming–Yuxi: 200 kilometres per hour (120 mph) (passengers); Yuxi–Hekou: 140 kilometres per hour (87 mph) (passengers); Kunming–Hekou: 120 kilometres per hour (75 mph) (cargo)

The Kunming–Yuxi–Hekou railway is a standard-gauge railway in Yunnan Province of China, linking the provincial capital Kunming with the town of Hekou on the Vietnamese border. Constructed in several stages between 1989 and 2014, the Kunming–Yuxi–Hekou railway has largely replaced the Chinese section of the old metre-gauge Kunming–Haiphong railway for normal passenger and cargo transportation. The line is electrified, but single-tracked over most of its length.

The line consists of three segments:

- Kunming–Yuxi railway, length 106 km (66 mi), opened in December 1993, upgraded in 2016;
- Yuxi–Mengzi railway, length 141 km (88 mi), opened in February 23, 2013;
- Mengzi–Hekou railway, length 141 km (88 mi), opened in December 1, 2014.

On 20 February 2025 the Vietnamese parliament approved an $8 billion railroad investment to upgrade under Xi Jinping's Belt and road initiative, the rail line which serves the Chinese border city Hekou Yao, Lao Cai, Hanoi and Haiphong.

== Route ==
Although the new line roughly parallels the Kunming–Hekou section of the old narrow-gauge Kunming–Hai Phong railway, routes of the two lines are significantly different. The new rail line, passing through Tonghai and Jianshui, is about 30 km (19 mi) west of the old metre-gauge railway (which runs via Yiliang and Kaiyuan).

The rail line will link the key manufacturing homes of Samsung, Foxconn, Pegatron and other global giants, who rely on components from China.

=== Kunming–Yuxi ===
The Kunming–Yuxi railway or Kunyu railway (simplified Chinese: 昆玉铁路; traditional Chinese: 昆玉鐵路; pinyin: kūnyù tiělù), is a single-track railroad in Yunnan Province of Southwest China. The line runs 106 km (66 mi) from Kunming to Yuxi and was built from 1989 to 1993. Bridges and tunnels account for 22% of the total length of the line.

The major upgrade project of Kunming–Yuxi railway started in 2010, and completed in 2016. The EMU train entered into operation from December 29, 2016.

A branch line, the Yuxi–Mohan railway opened in December 2021. It leads from Yuxi to Mohan where it connects to the Boten–Vientiane railway at the Chinese–Laotian border.

=== Yuxi–Mengzi ===
The line runs 141 km (88 mi) from Yuxi in central Yunnan to Mengzi City in southern Yunnan. Construction began on December 15, 2005, and was completed in mid-August 2012 and the line opened to commercial service on February 23, 2013.

Cities and towns along route include Yuxi, Tonghai County, Jianshui County and Mengzi.

=== Mengzi–Hekou ===
The Mengzi–Hekou rail line runs 141 km (88 mi) from Mengzi City in southern Yunnan to the Hekou Yao Autonomous County on the border with Vietnam. Construction began in December 2008 and the line entered operation in December 2014, with two trains running daily from Kunming to Hekou and the travel time of 6 hours. Regular passenger service operates between Hekou North and Kunming, with some trains continuing to Dali.

A key element of the Mengzi–Hekou railway is the Taiyangzhai Tunnel (太阳寨隧道). The 7,414 metre-long tunnel is located in Yaoshan Township (瑶山乡) of Hekou County. Construction workers' working conditions in this tunnel have been reported as particularly difficult: with the temperature in the tunnel reaching 43 °C and relative humidity 98%, it was nicknamed the "sauna tunnel" by the workers. Drilling of this tunnel was completed in September 2013, making it possible for the entire railway project to stay on time for the completion by the end of 2014.

== Connections to the narrow-gauge network ==
A short metre-gauge connector line operates at Hekou North railway station to facilitate transfers of passengers and cargo to the Vietnamese metre-gauge section of the Kunming–Haiphong railway, in both directions.

== Gallery ==
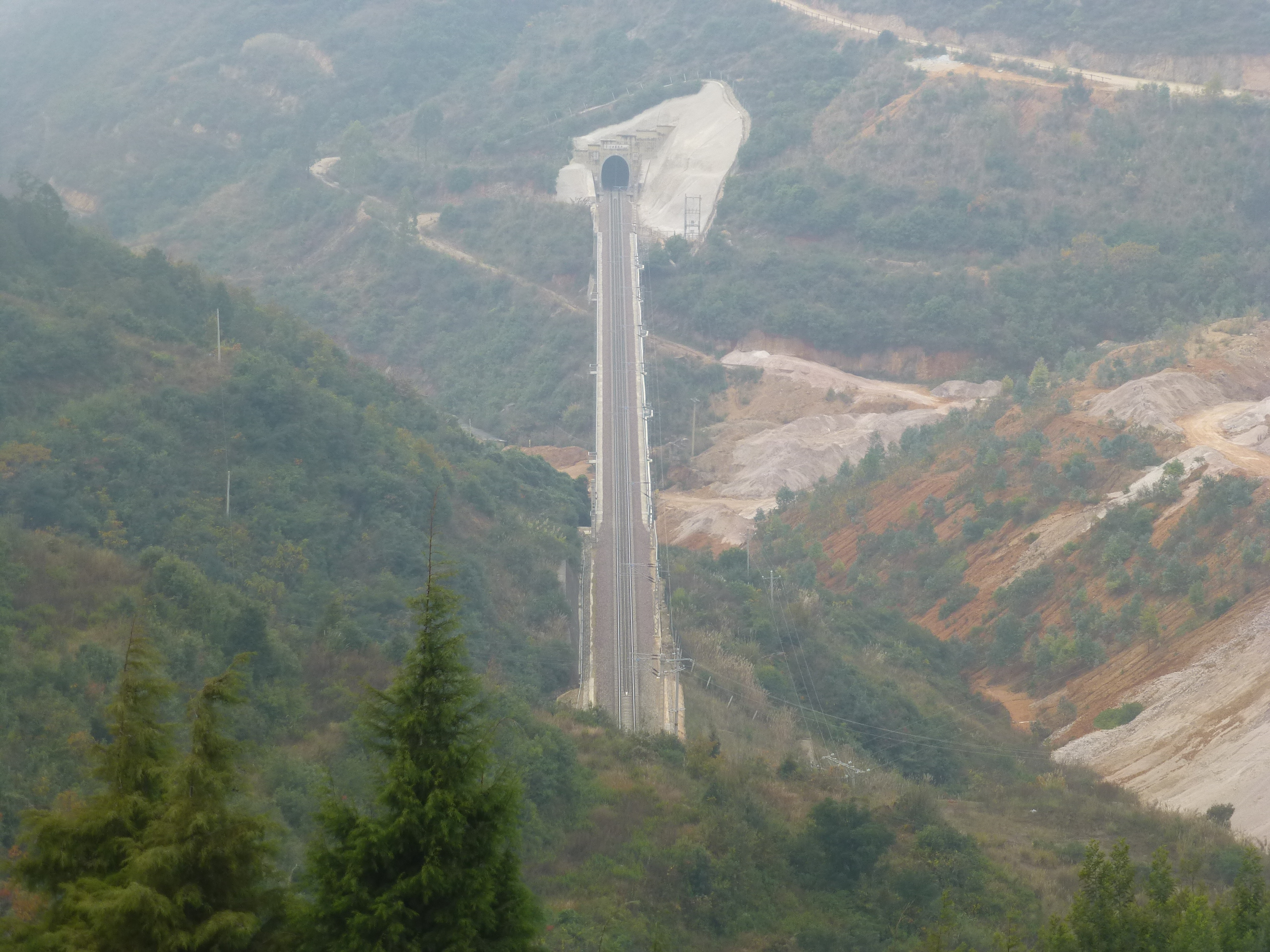
Entrance to Xiaoxingzhai Tunnel, between Yuxi and Tonghai

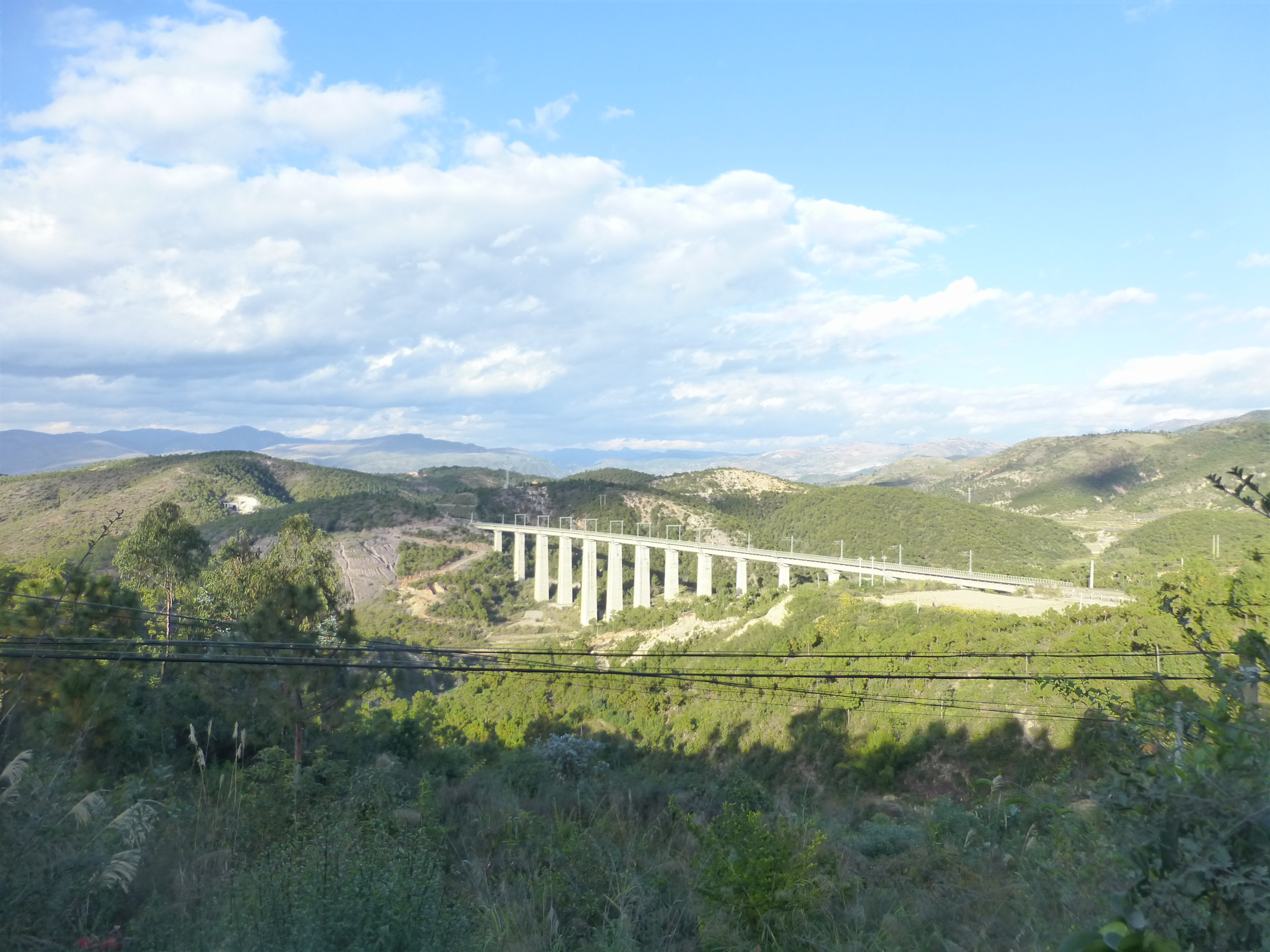
An elevated section between two tunnel sections, between Tonghai and Jianshui

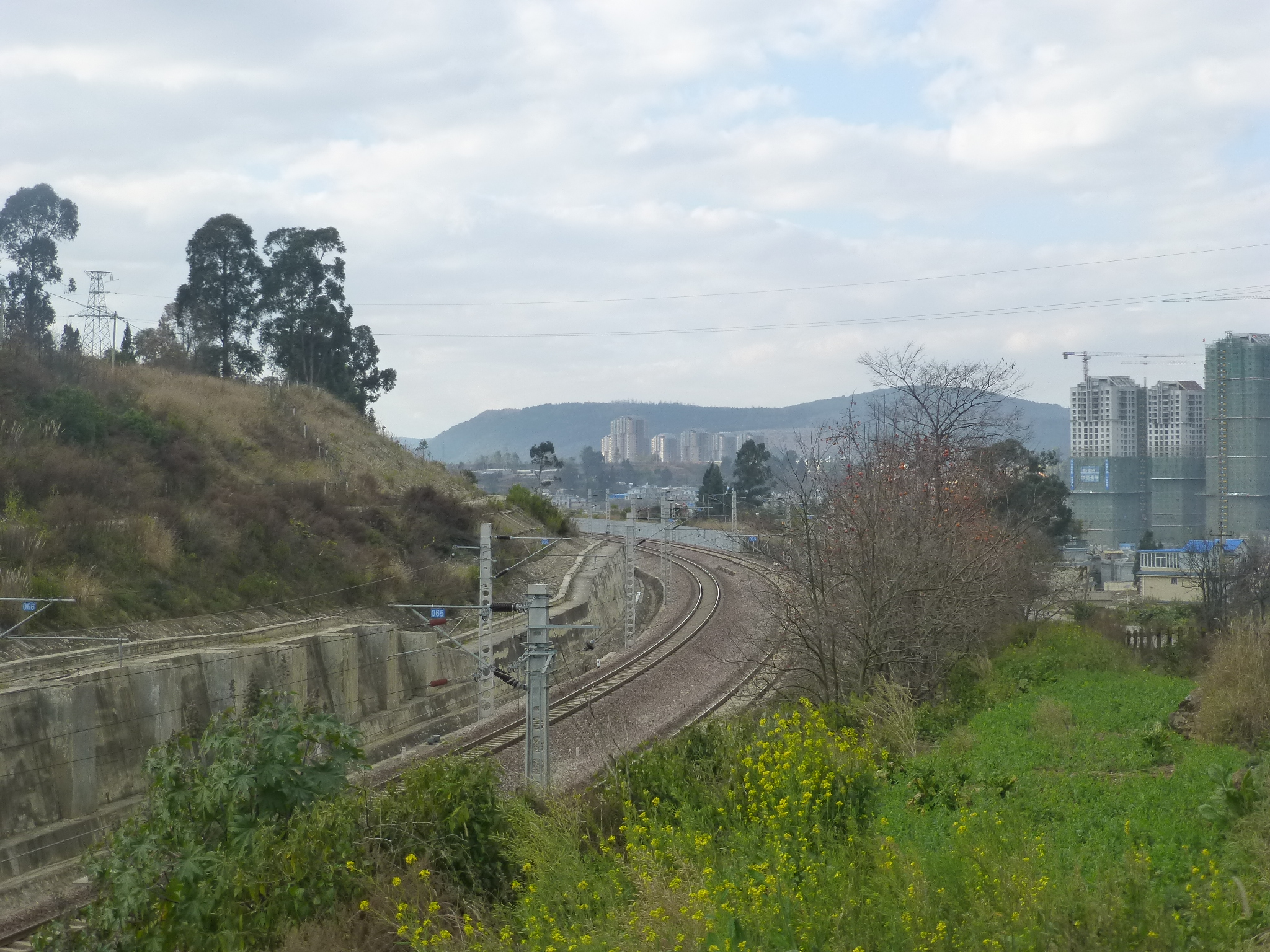
Kunming–Yuxi railway in Haikou Subdistrict, Xishan District, Kunming

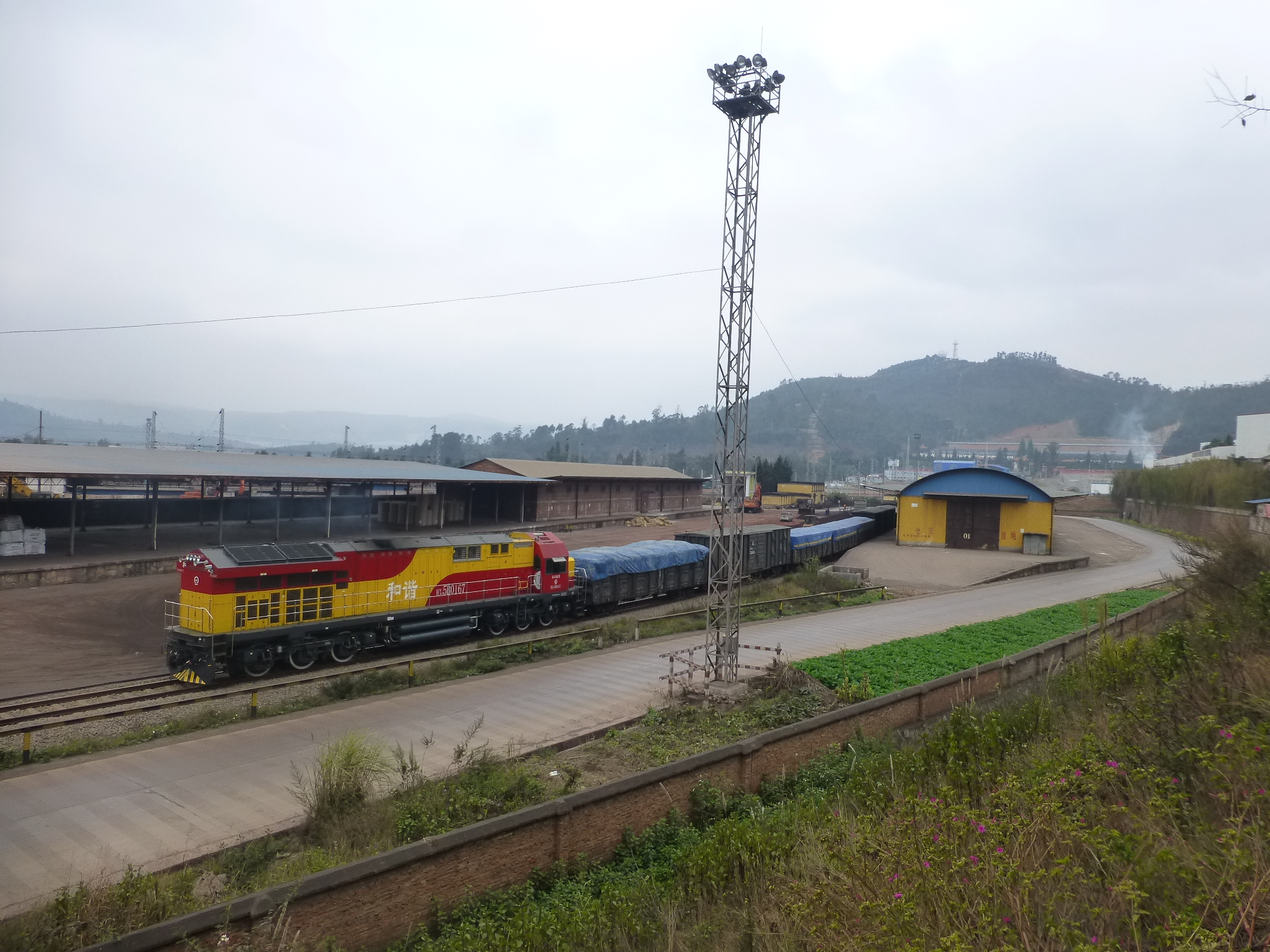
Yuxi South (Yuxinan) station, the southern end point of the Kunming–Yuxi railway, is a freight station serving an important industrial area

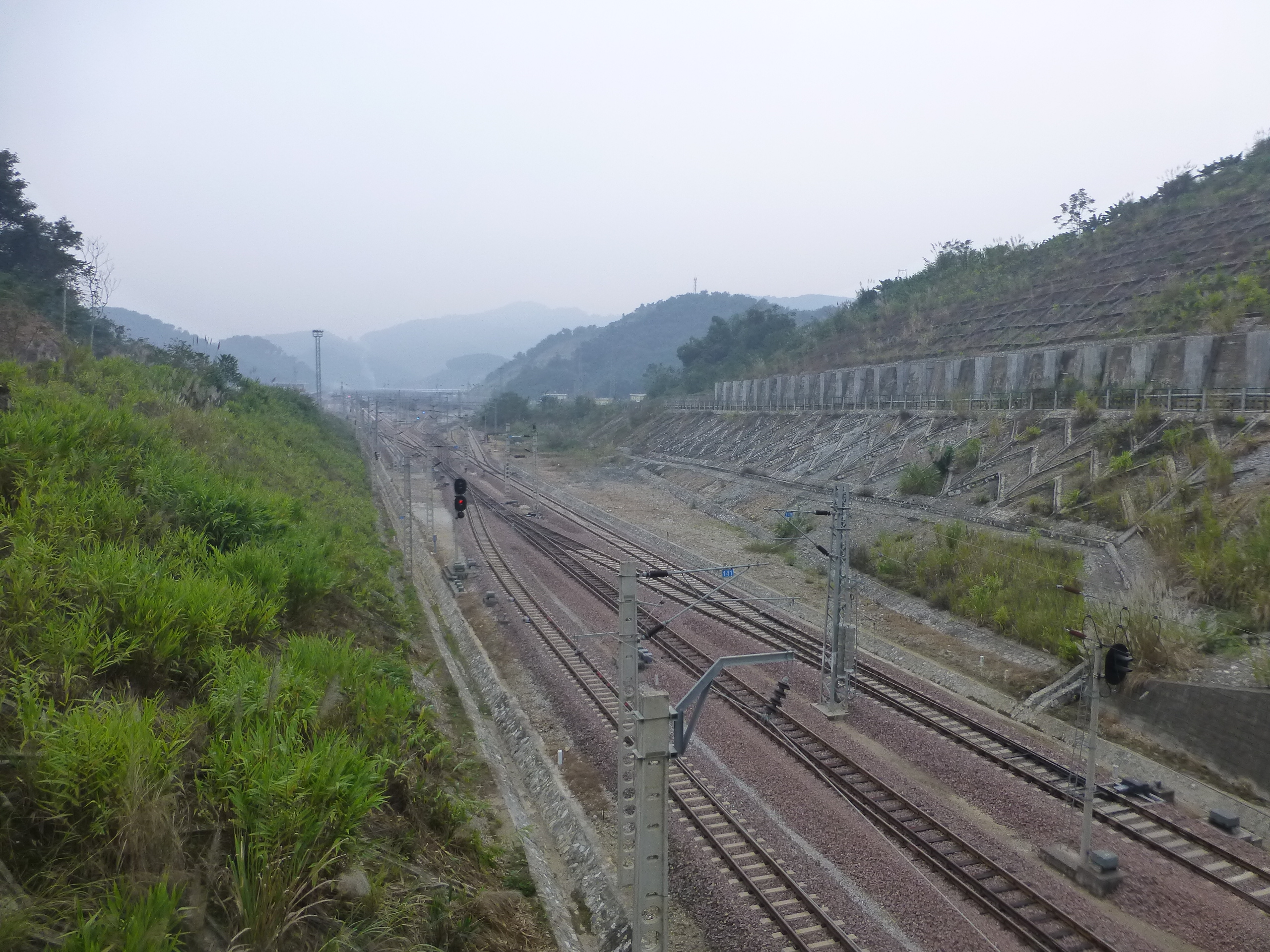
Southern terminus of the standard gauge Kunming–Hekou railway with a metre gauge at the Hekou North railway station before towards to Vietnam.
