= Kunming–Haiphong railway =

Railway in Vietnam and China

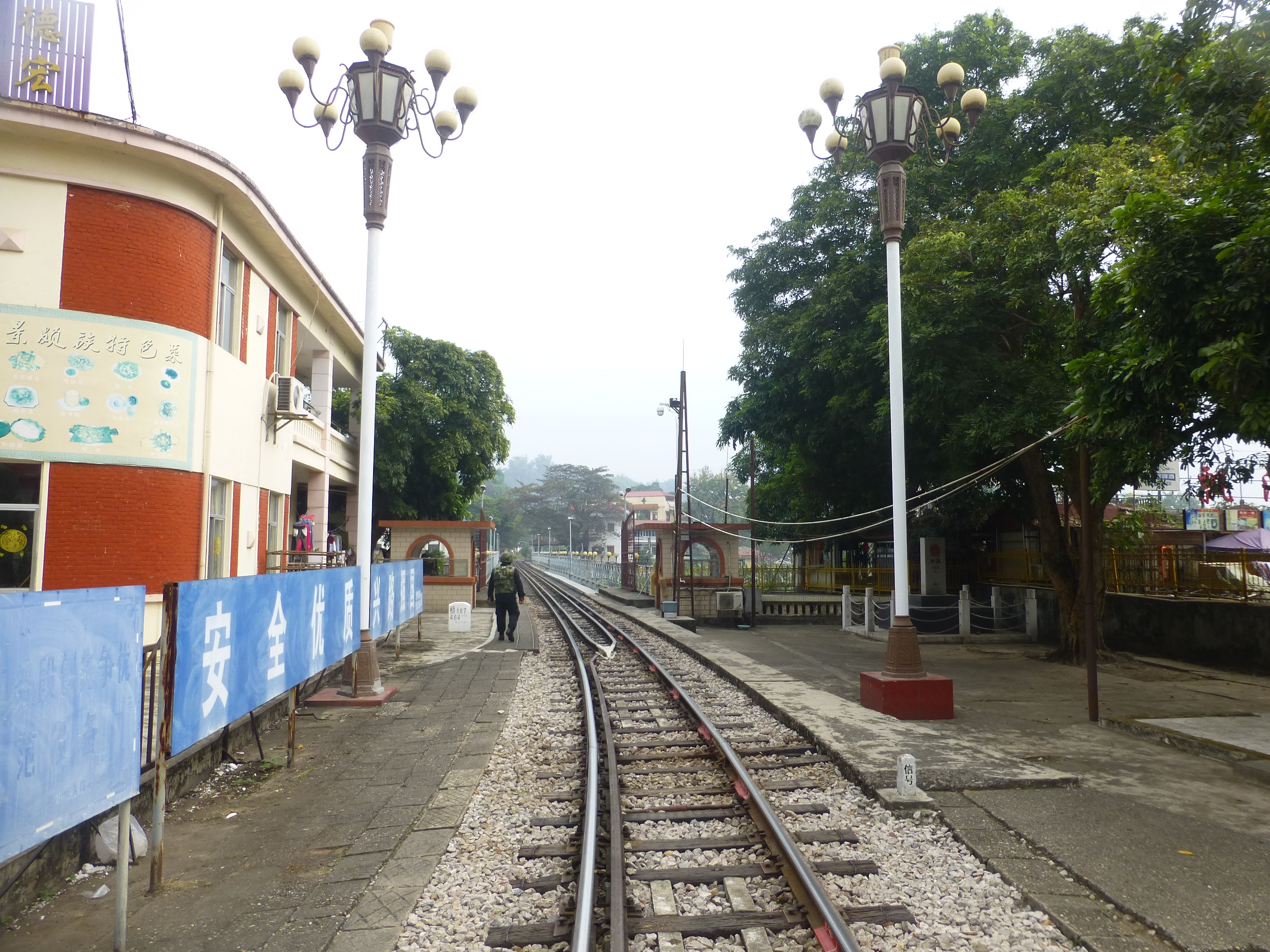
- The Kunming–Haiphong railway in Hekou town

Overview
- Other names: Yunnan–Vietnam railway; Sino–Vietnamese railway; Indo-China–Yunnan railway
- Status: Mostly freight services in China section
- Owner: China Railway (China section); Vietnam Railways (Vietnam section)
- Locale: Southwest China; Northwest Vietnam; Red River Delta
- Termini: Kunming North; Hai Phong
- Connecting lines: Kunming–Hekou railway (old section); Hanoi–Lào Cai railway; Hanoi–Haiphong railway
- Stations: 66

Service
- Type: Regional rail; Freight rail; Commuter rail
- Operators: China Railway Kunming Group; Vietnam Railways

History
- Work began: 1904–1910
- Opened: 1 April 1910
- Last extension: 16 June 1902
- Built by: French Colonial Administration

Technical
- Line length: 855 km (531 mi)
- Number of tracks: 1
- Track gauge: 1,000 mm (3 ft 3 3/8 in) metre gauge

The Yunnan–Haiphong railway (Chinese: 滇越铁路; pinyin: Diānyuè Tiělù; Vietnamese: tuyến đường sắt Hải Phòng – Vân Nam / 綫塘鐵海防－雲南; French: Chemins de Fer de L'Indo-Chine et du Yunnan, "Indo-China–Yunnan Railroad") is an 855 km (531 mi) railway built by France from 1904 to 1910, connecting Haiphong, Vietnam, with Kunming, Yunnan province, China. The section within China from Kunming to Hekou is known as the Kunming–Hekou railway (Chinese: 昆河铁路; pinyin: Kun–He tielu), and is 466 km (290 mi) long. The section within Vietnam is 389 km (242 mi) long, and is known as the Hanoi–Lào Cai railway (Vietnamese: Đường sắt Hà Nội – Lào Cai / 塘鐵河内－老街). The railway was built with 1,000 mm (3 ft 3 3/8 in) gauge due to the mountainous terrain along the route. Currently it is the only main line in China using 1,000 mm (3 ft 3 3/8 in) metre gauge.

== History ==
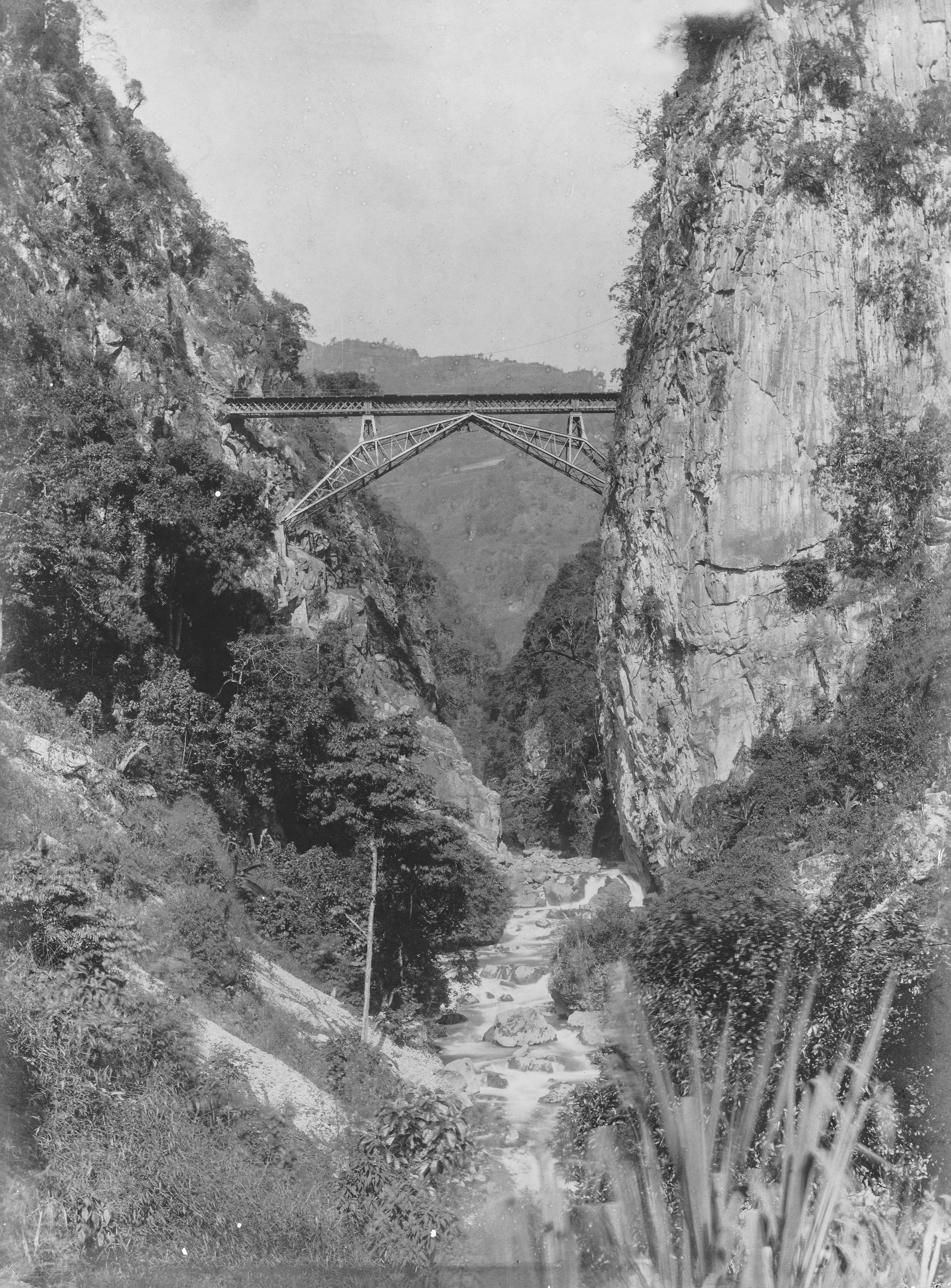
The Faux Namti (Wujiazhai) Bridge over the Sicha River, in the Nanxi Valley region. More than 800 Chinese coolies died here.

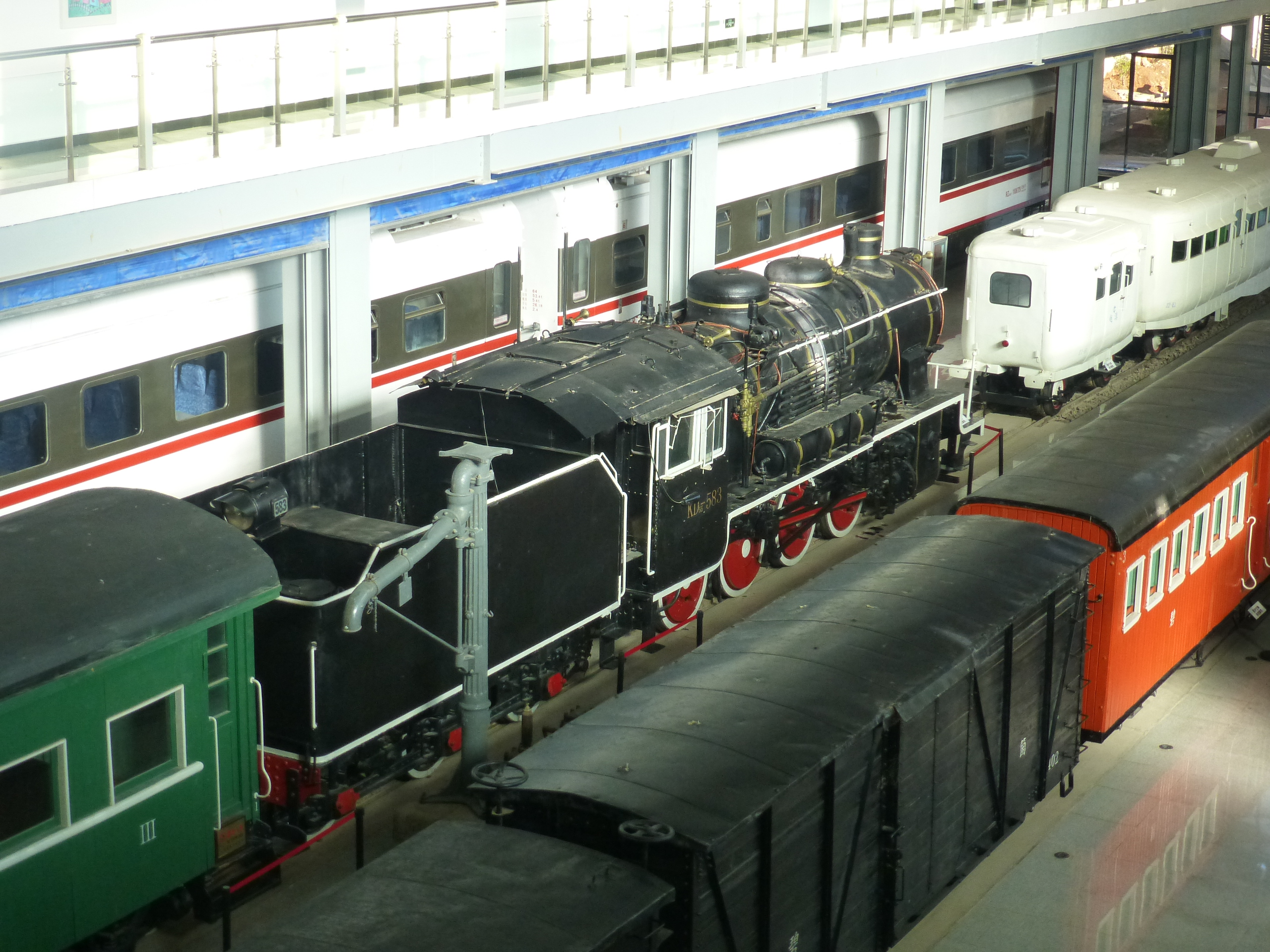
Historic rolling stock from the Kunming–Hekou railway and its branches in the Yunnan Railway Museum, at Kunming North railway station

In the 19th century, the French colonial administration worked to develop regular trading networks and an efficient transport infrastructure between Indochina and south-west China. The primary motivation for such an effort was to facilitate export of European goods to China. A railway would also give France access to Yunnan's natural resources, mineral resources and opium, and open up the Chinese market for Indochinese products such as rice, dry fish, wood and coal.

Before the railway was built, the standard travel time from Haiphong (the closest sea port to most of Yunnan) to Kunming was reckoned by the Western authorities to be 28 days: 16 days by steamer and then a small boat up the Red River to Manhao (425 miles (684 km)), and then 12 days overland (194 miles (312 km)).

The right to build the railway was obtained following China's defeat in the First Sino-Japanese War (1894–95). At a cost of 95 million francs (€362 million), the railway was among the most ambitious colonial projects undertaken by France, and was put into use on 1 April 1910. The 1,000 mm (3 ft 3 3/8 in) metre gauge section was originally administered in more or less the same way as the Indochinese networks, and if not for a "missing link" through Cambodia (between Saigon and Phnom Penh), it would have been physically possible for through trains to run from Kunming to Singapore, as 1,000 mm (3 ft 3 3/8 in) metre gauge was used in Malaya as well.

Under pressure from Japan, France closed the line on 16 July 1940 to cut supplies to China during the Second Sino-Japanese War. During the Japanese occupation Japanese National Railways Class 9600 2-8-0 locomotives were shipped to aid their invasion, and after the completion of the "death railway" it was possible for a time to send through traffic to Burma and hence to the Indian 1,000 mm (3 ft 3 3/8 in) metre gauge network. This is now not possible, as sections of the railway were destroyed during the conflicts since World War II.

During the Sino-Vietnamese War of 1979, the railway bridge across the Nanxi River at the two countries' border was destroyed, and the trade between China and Vietnam came to a halt for several years.

== Gebishi railway ==
The 600 mm (1 ft 11 5/8 in) narrow-gauge Gebishi branch line was built from Bisezhai towards Shiping and was 176 kilometres (109 mi) long. It was constructed in 1915 and the last 72 kilometres (45 mi) part was closed in 1990.

== Present state ==
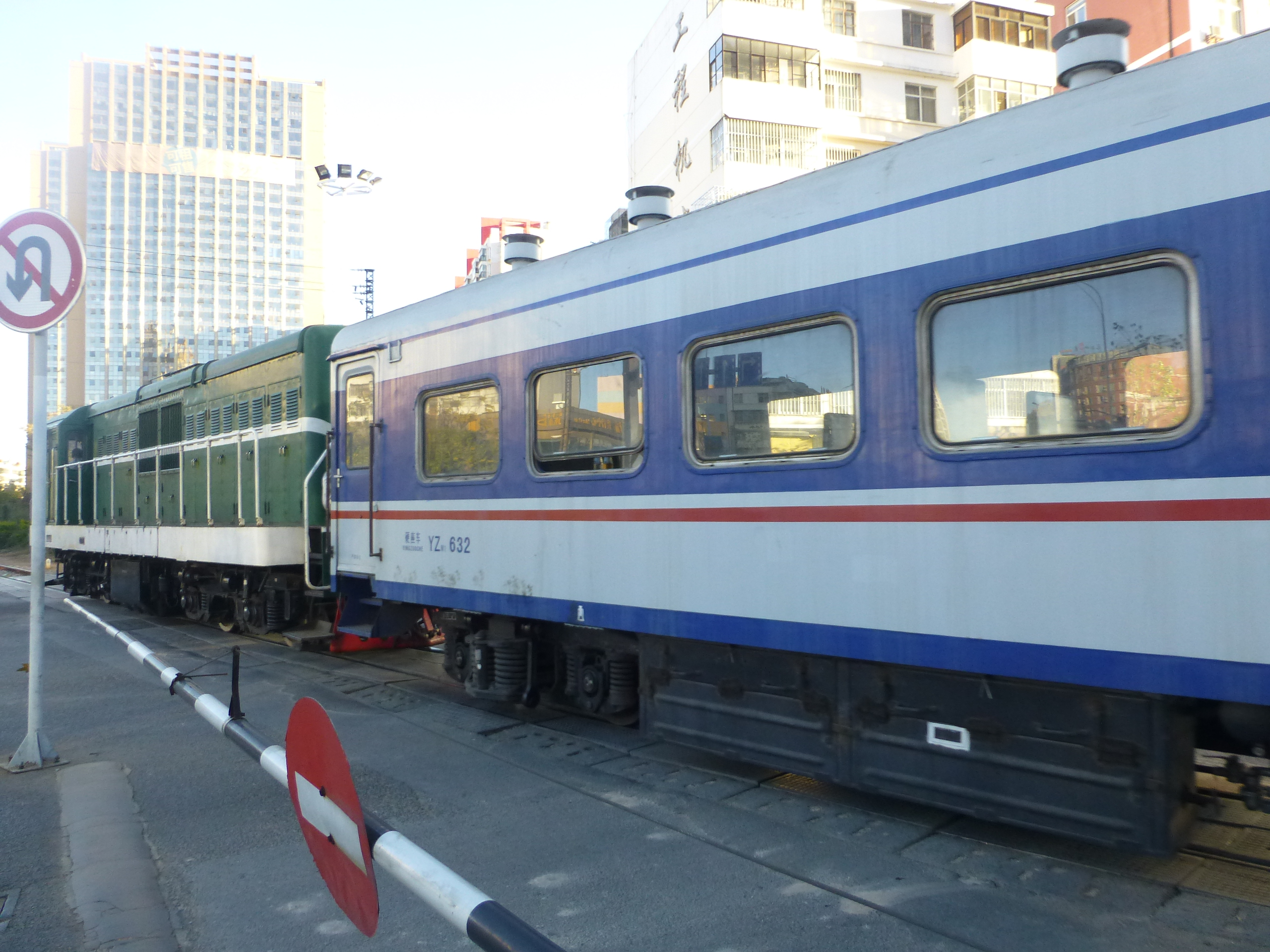
A commuter train on a Kunming North – Wangjiaying run in 2016

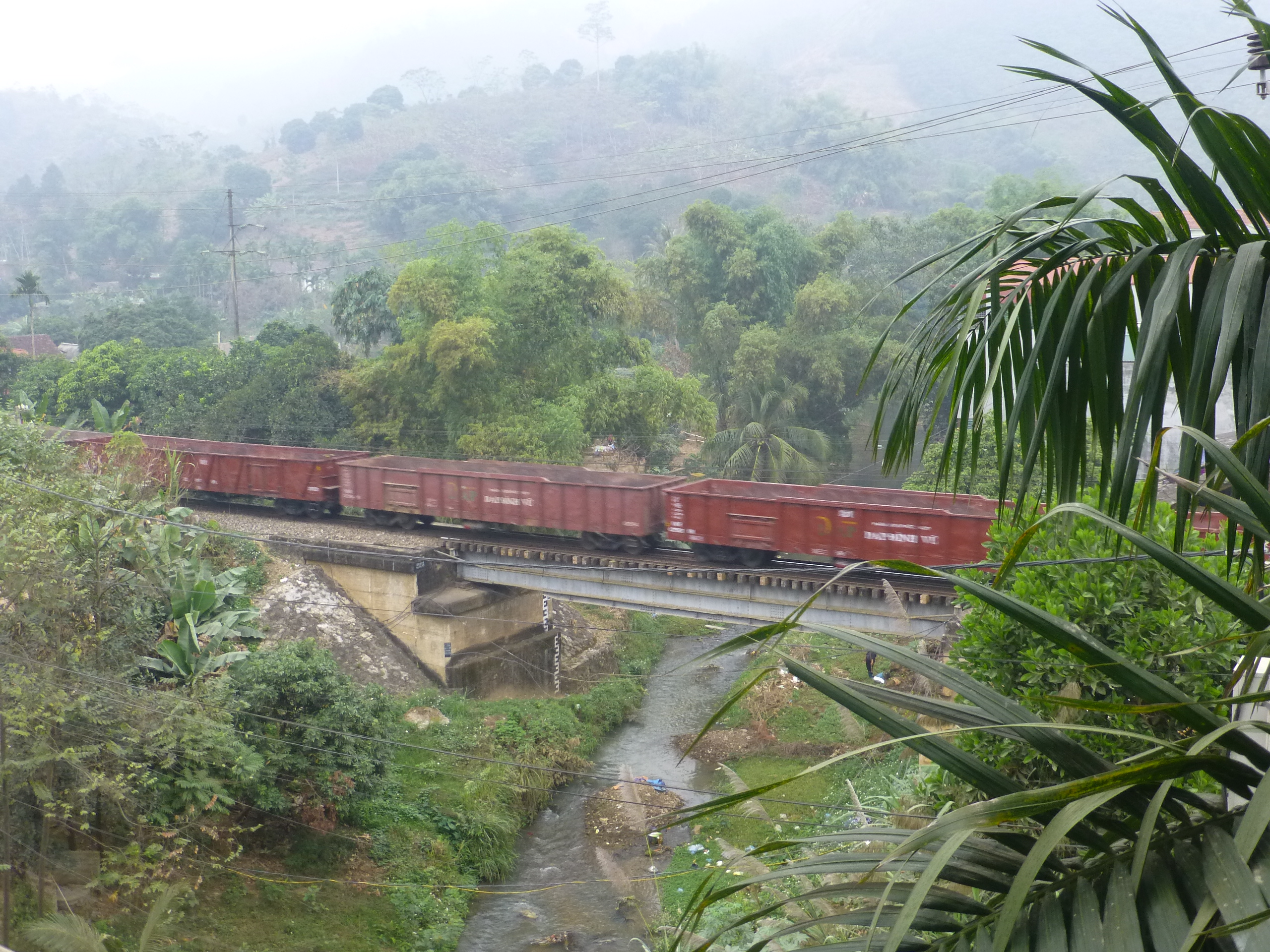
A freight train on the Hanoi–Lao Cai railway, near Bảo Hà station

Twice-a-week cross-border passenger service operated as late as 2000; the second-class passengers had to transfer from a Chinese train to a Vietnamese train at the border station, while the first-class car passengers could remain on board as their car was transferred to the train across the border. However, landslides caused frequent delays. Eventually, in 2005 the passenger service on the Chinese section of the railway (the Kunming–Hekou railway) was terminated, and most of the passenger coaches were donated to Myanmar.

In 2008, passenger service on a small part (37 km (23 mi) long) of the Chinese section of the railway was resumed, but on a very limited scale. As of 2012, two daily trains ran from Kunming North railway station on the metre-gauge tracks to Shizui (石咀) Station on the western outskirts of Kunming, and to Wangjiaying (王家营) east of the city. As of 2016, this service still continues, with 2 daily trains to Wangjiaying and one to Shizui. In December 2017, in order to leave room for the construction of the Kunming No.4 Metro line, the commuter train service between Shizui and Wangjiaying was terminated again, and parts of the metre gauge railway in the urban area was demolished. In 2022, the metre-gauge railway within the Kunming urban area was rebuilt, but no train services were operating on the line as of September 2023.

Freight service continues to operate throughout the Kunming–Hekou railway. Some rolling stock continues to be maintained in working condition. According to a 2015 news report, over the seven preceding years, 63 metre gauge flatcars had been refurbished at the Kunming North Station's workshop, for use in transborder container shipping. In 2016, 100 mothballed freight railcars were selected to be refurbished at the Kaiyuan workshop and to be put into use again.

Among important cargo types moved internationally on this line are chemical fertilizers. Since 2015, direct trains have been run from the phosphate fertilizer manufacturers in Kaiyuan to consumers in Vietnam. In the opposite direction, sulphur and zinc ore concentrate are imported to China from Vietnam.

The overall role of the Kunming–Hekou metre-gauge line in the Sino-Vietnamese trade significantly declined in the 21st century, as compared to the railway's heyday in the first half of the 20th century. According to one article dated 2015 and describing the trade as it operated prior to the opening of the standard-gauge railway to Hekou in 2014 (see below), the most common route for cargo shipped from Kunming to Vietnam would be the rather circuitous one: via the Nanning–Kunming railway (opened 1997), the sea port of Fangchenggang, and then by ship to Haiphong. However, since 2015, the amount of transborder shipments on the metre-gauge line has been on the increase again. According to a 2017 report, the first quarter of 2017 saw 166,200 tons of freight shipped by rail on the transborder line, which represented a 66.2% increase from the same period of the previous year, and 12-year record. This consisted of 74,100 tons of fertilizers exported from China to Vietnam and 92,100 tons of sulphur and zinc ore concentrate imported to China from Vietnam.

On the Vietnamese side, the Hanoi–Haiphong and Hanoi–Lào Cai railways continue to be important for domestic and transborder cargo transportation. Passenger trains continue to run both from Hanoi to Haiphong and from Hanoi to the border town of Lào Cai.

== The new Kunming–Hekou railway line ==
A new 1,435 mm (4 ft 8 1/2 in) standard gauge railway line from Kunming toward the Vietnamese border (the Kunming–Yuxi–Hekou railway) has been constructed in several stages between the 1990s and the 2010s. Its first section, a railway branch from Kunming to Yuxi, was opened in 1993. The new Yuxi–Mengzi section opened for freight service in February 2013; in April 2013, passenger trains started running daily as far as Mengzi North, 258 km (160 mi) south of Kunming and approximately 150 km (93 mi) north of Hekou. A second daily train was added by July.

The Mengzi–Hekou section was opened in December 2014, and regular passenger service started between Hekou North railway station and Kunming, with some trains continuing to Dali.

Although the new Kunming–Yuxi–Mengzi–Hekou rail line roughly parallels the old Kunming–Haiphong railway, the routes of the two railways are significantly different: the new rail line, passing through Tonghai and Jianshui, is about 30 km (19 mi) west of the old 1,000 mm (3 ft 3 3/8 in) metre gauge railway (which runs via Yiliang and Kaiyuan).

== Connections to standard-gauge network ==
There are a few points where the Kunming–Haiphong railway comes into contact with the standard-gauge network, enabling transfer of freight between the narrow-gauge and standard-gauge trains.

In Vietnam, the Hanoi metropolitan area has standard-gauge access via the dual-gauge (metre and standard) line that runs from Hanoi's Gia Lâm railway station to the Chinese (Guangxi) border at Đồng Đăng; this is the line that enables direct standard-gauge connection between Hanoi and China.

At the narrow-gauge railway's northern end, Kunming, is served both by the metre-gauge railway and by standard-gauge railways. There is even a level-crossing between the tracks of different gauges.

A short metre-gauge connector line has been constructed between the new Hekou North railway station (the southern terminal of the new standard-gauge line) and the old metre-gauge railway, thus allowing to bring cargo from Vietnam on metre-gauge railcar for reloading to standard-gauge rolling stock, and vice versa. The short connecting line joins the Kunming–Haiphong narrow-gauge mainline at 22.514674°N 103.986049°E, a few kilometres from the old Hekou Station.

A similar connection between the narrow-gauge and standard-gauge network exist in Mengzi, where the narrow-gauge Yuguopo railway station (雨过铺站) on the Caoba–Guanjiashan branch is adjacent to the standard-gauge Mengzi North railway station (蒙自北站) on the Kunming–Yuxi–Hekou line.

== Museums and memorials ==
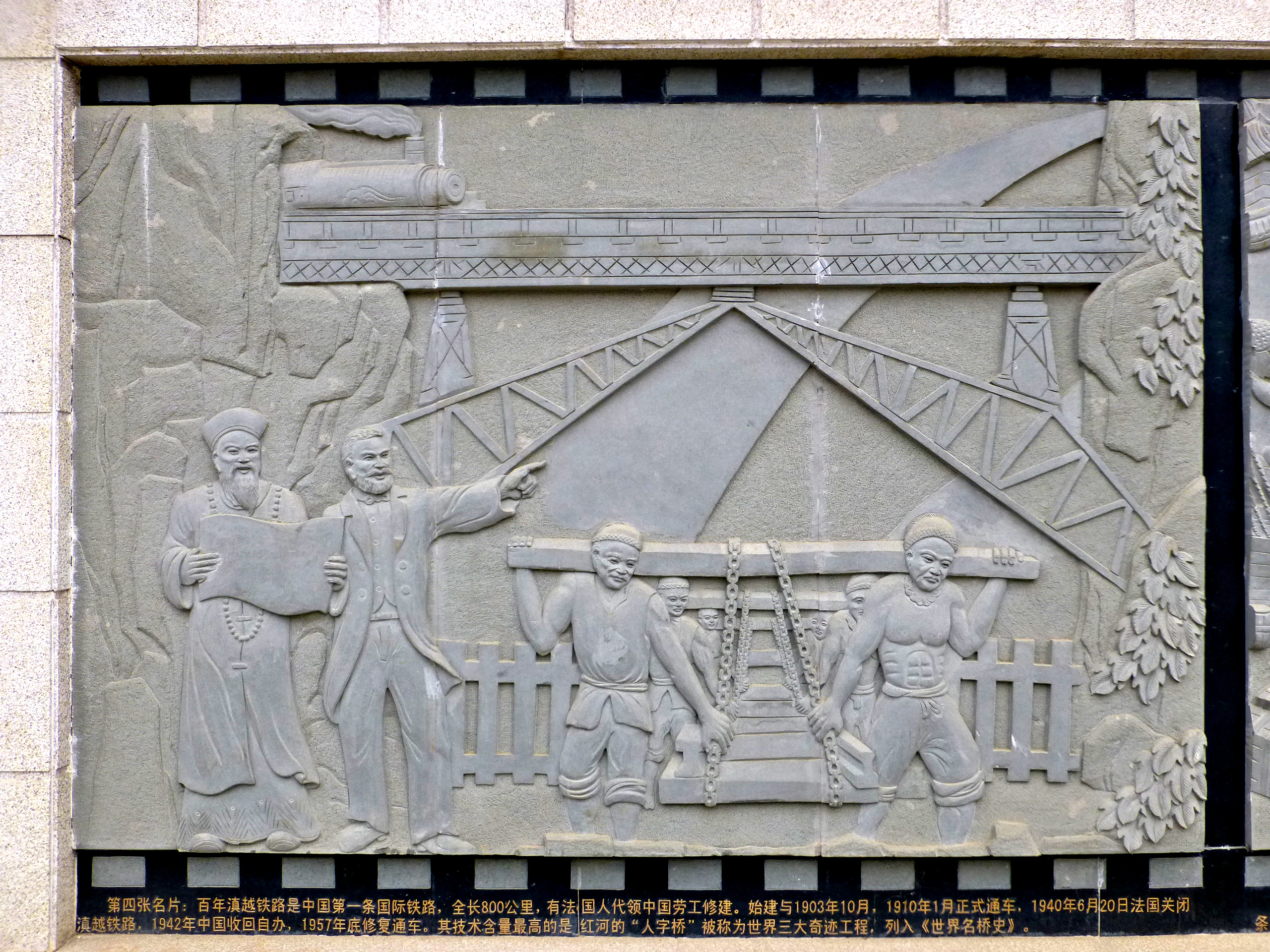
A section of the commemorative relief series in Hekou

The Yunnan Railway Museum, at Kunming North railway station, has a large exhibit on the Kunming–Haiphong railway and its narrow-gauge branch lines within Yunnan, although it covers the history of the province's standard gauge railways as well.

At Hekou, the square outside of the new Hekou North railway station (opened 2014) is decorated with reliefs depicting the history of the transportation and economy in the region, with a special focus on the Kunming–Haiphong railway.

3 Steam locomotives are preserved.

- JF51 No. 738: is preserved at the China Railway Museum.
- KD55 No. 579: is preserved at the China Railway Museum.
- KD55 No. 583: is preserved at the Yunnan Railway Museum.
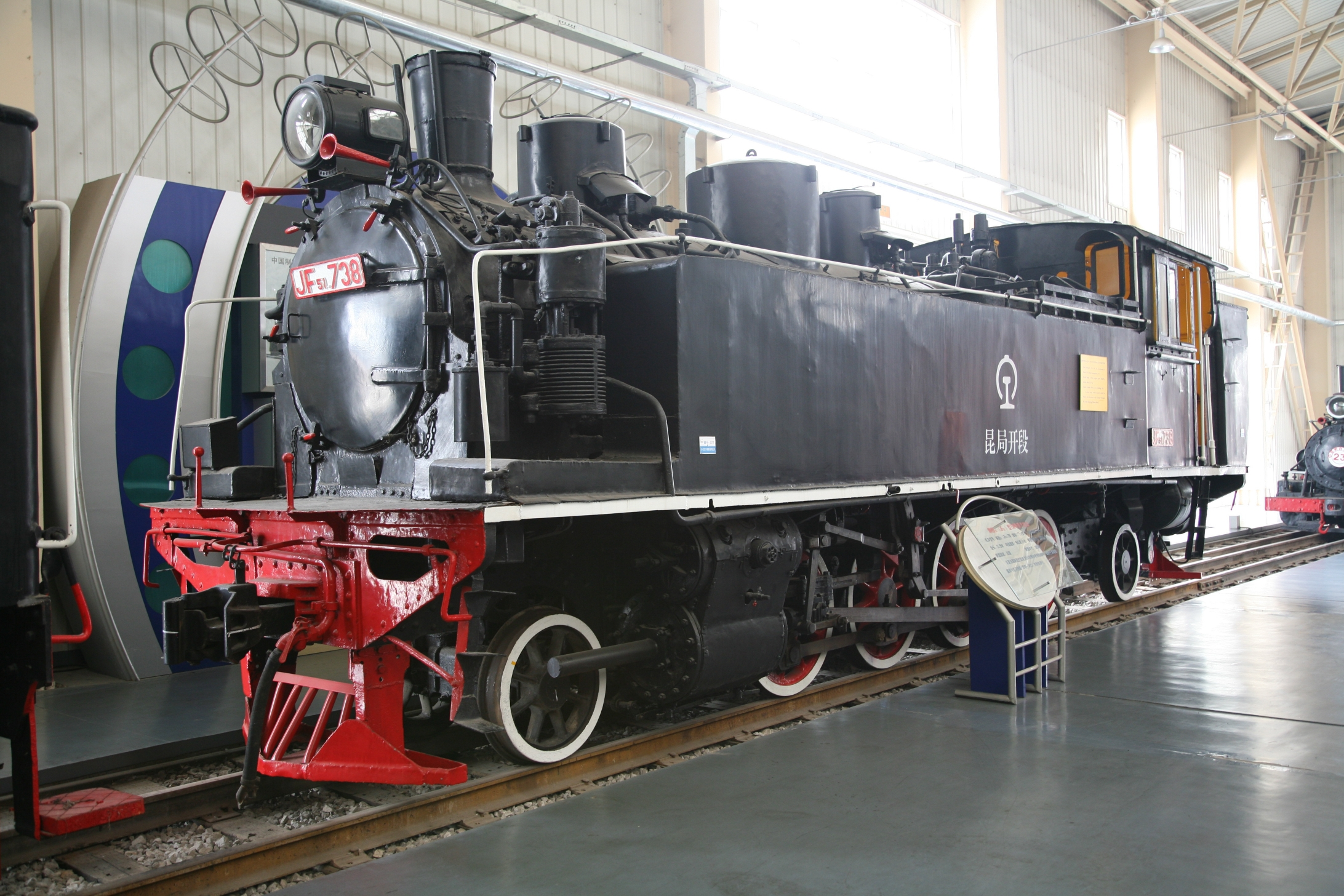
JF51-738 at China Railway Museum

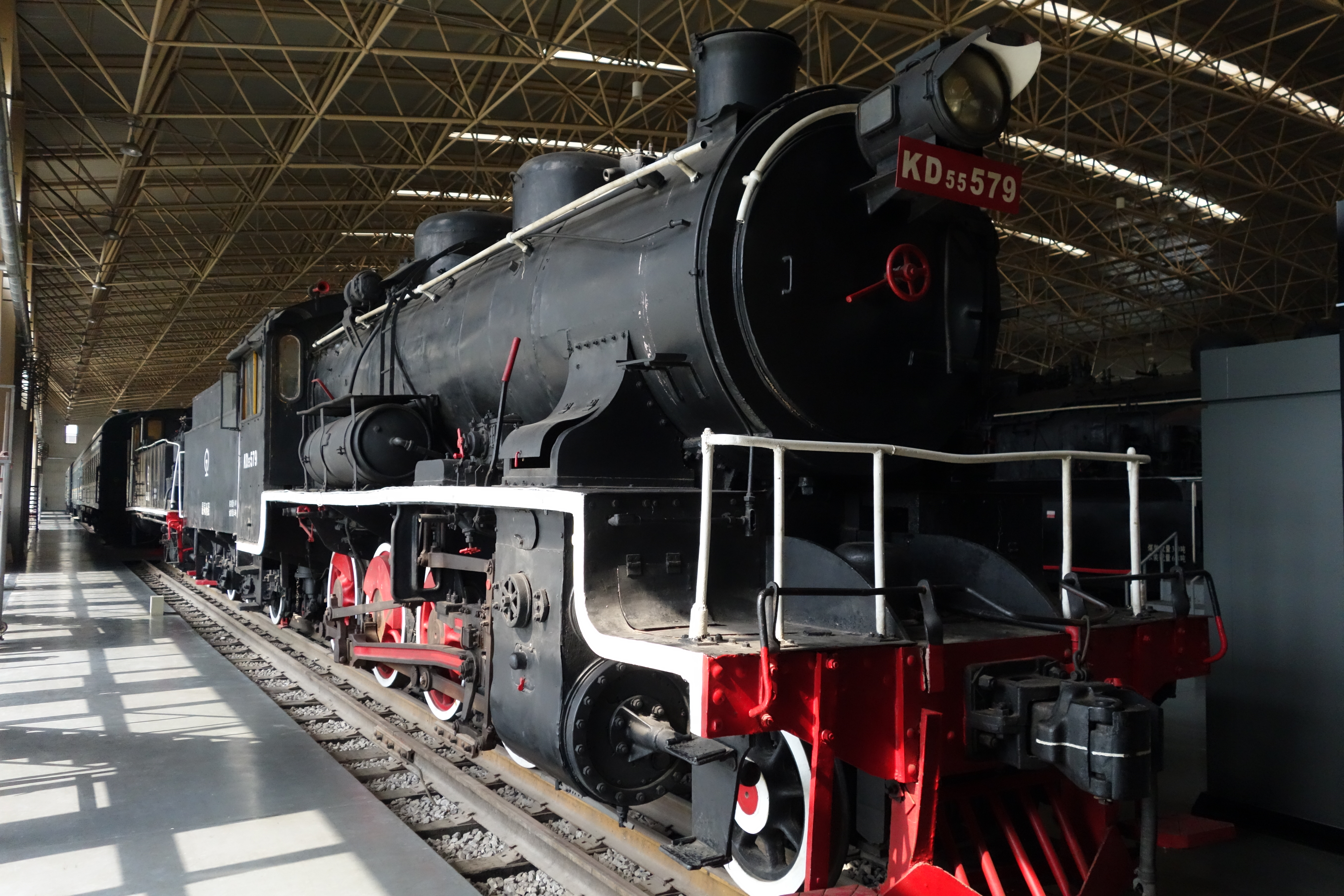
KD55-579 at the China Railway Museum

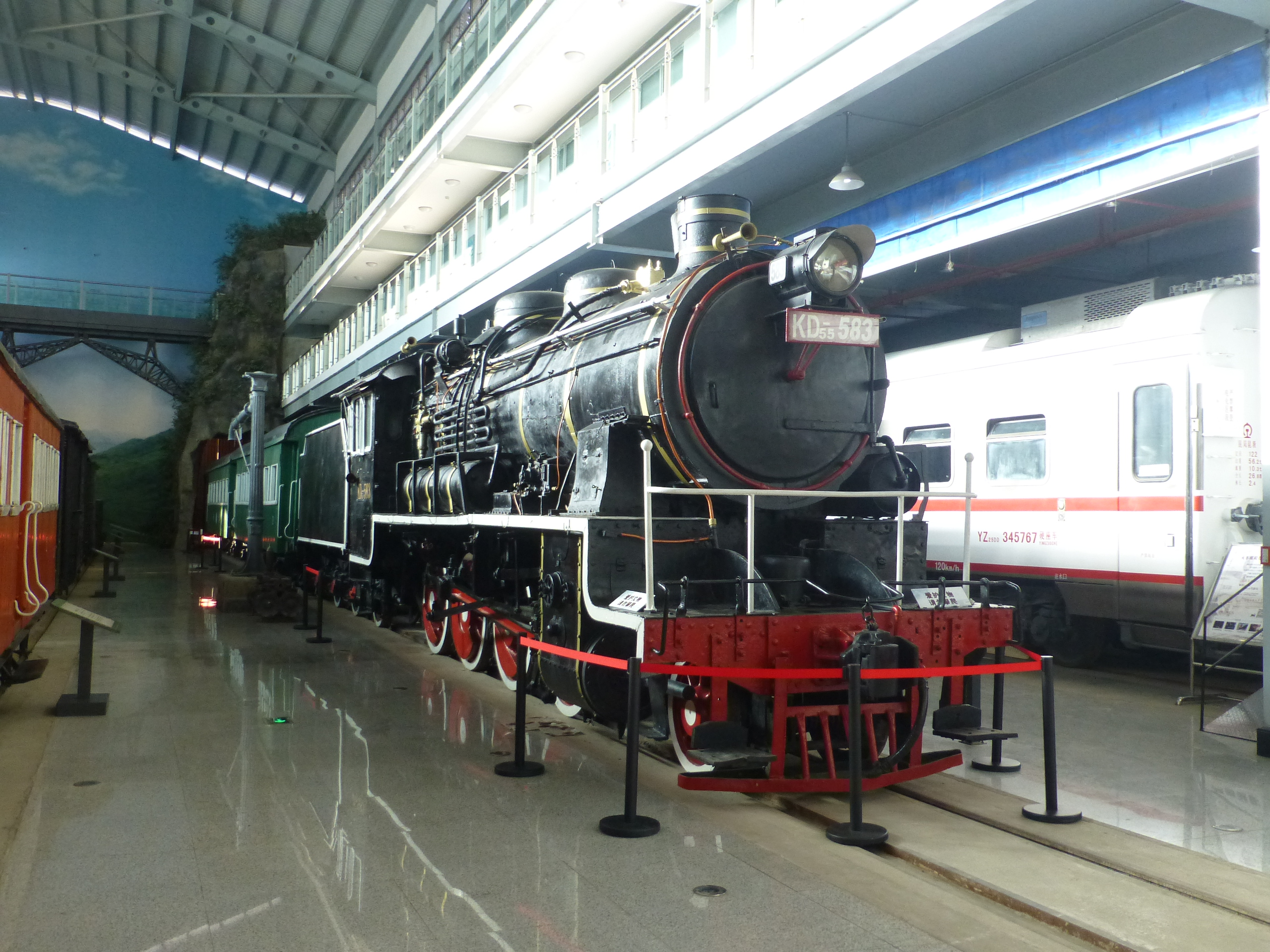
KD55-583 at the Yunnan Railway Museum

== In fiction ==
- Bisezhai Station (碧色寨) by Fan Wen (范稳).

== See also ==
- Banque de l'Indochine, which financed the railway
- China Railways DFH21 (aka DF10H), main motive power on the railway in the latter quarter of the 20th century
- Ethio-Djibouti Railways, a similar French-designed metre-gauge railway in Africa
- Guangzhouwan
- Hanoi–Haiphong railway
- Hanoi–Lào Cai railway
- History of rail transport in China
- List of former foreign enclaves in China
- Nanning–Kunming Railway (opened 1997), the main modern link between Yunnan and China's ports on the Tonkin Gulf
- Narrow gauge railways in China
- Yunnan–Burma Railway, an abortive project abandoned during World War II
