= Central Yunnan =

Region of Yunnan province, China

Central Yunnan 滇中
- Interactive map of Central Yunnan
- Coordinates: 24.986°N 101.997°E
- Country: China
- Province: Yunnan

Area
  - Total: 111,400 km^{2} (43,000 sq mi)

Population (2018)
  - Total: 21,270,000

Central Yunnan (Chinese: 滇中) refers to the region of Yunnan province, China, consisting of Kunming, Dali, Chuxiong, Yuxi, and 7 counties of northern Honghe Hani and Yi Autonomous Prefecture (Mengzi, Gejiu, Jianshui, Kaiyuan, Mile, Luxi, and Shiping). It accounts for 44.1% of Yunnan's population, and 61.6% of the province's GDP.

The region is considered poor for urban agglomerations in China, suffering from water shortage and limited infrastructure. Government plans call for urbanization of the region, and linking Kunming and Yuxi into one large agglomeration.

Geographically, Central Yunnan is relatively flat compared to the rest of Yunnan and has a larger area of arable land.

In 2015, the State Council approved the Central Yunnan New Area.

== See also ==
- Central Yunnan Water Diversion Project
- China Western Development
