= Yingzhou Pavilion =

Pavilion in Mengzi City, China

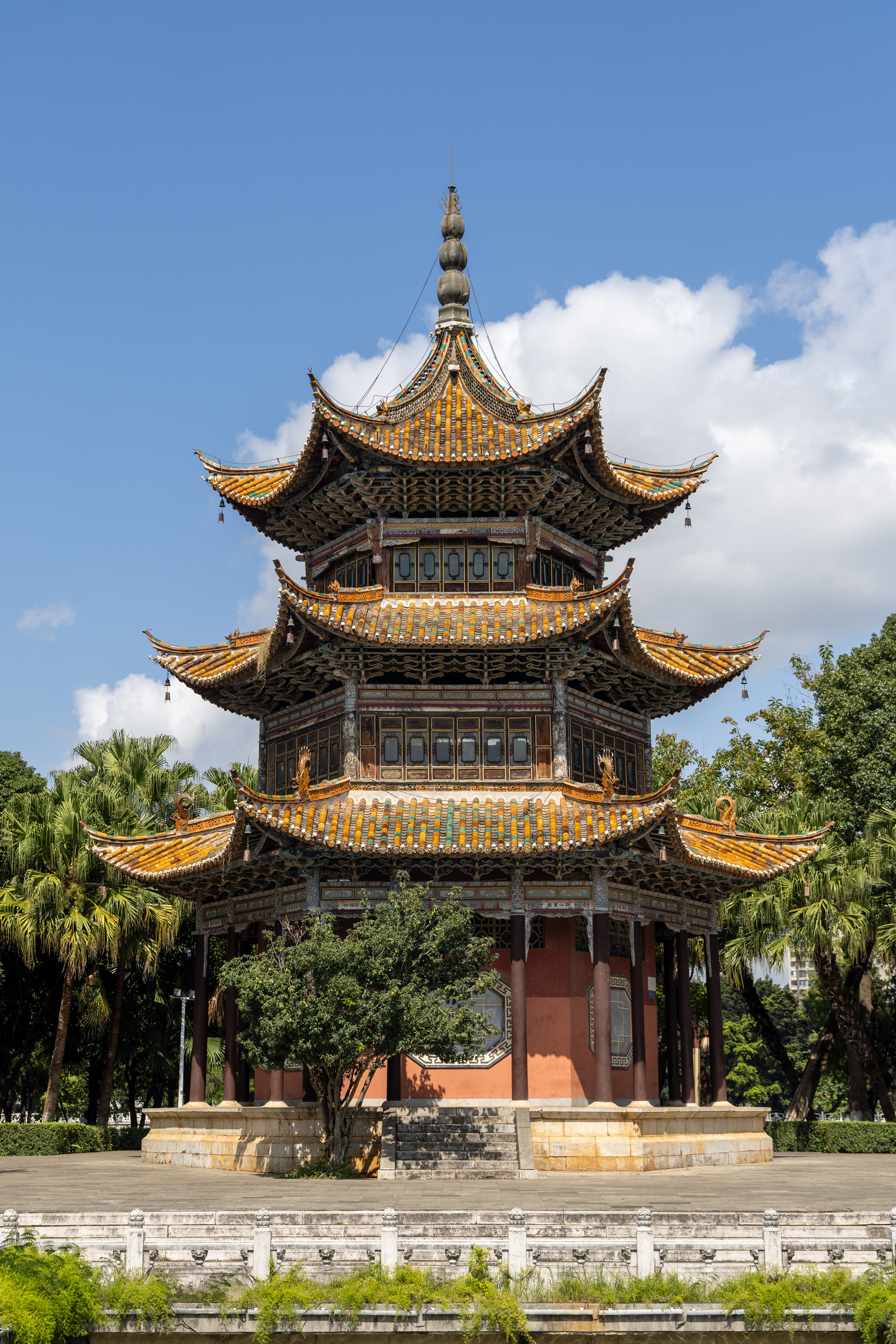
Yingzhou Pavilion

The Yingzhou Pavilion (Chinese: 瀛洲亭), known locally as Liujiao Pavilion (Chinese: 六角亭), is a historic Chinese pavilion characterized by its hexagonal structure situated within South Lake Park in Mengzi City, Honghe Hani and Yi Autonomous Prefecture, Yunnan Province, China.

== History ==
Constructed in 1690 during the reign of the Kangxi Emperor of the Qing Dynasty, this pavilion has been an integral part of the region's cultural heritage. Over the centuries, it has undergone numerous renovations to preserve its structural integrity and historical value. Originally, Yingzhou Pavilion, along with the surrounding mountains and lake, constituted one of Mengzi's twelve scenic spots, a testament to its aesthetic and cultural significance. In recognition of its historical importance, it was designated a provincial-level cultural heritage site in 1987.
