= Kaiyuan South railway station =

Railway station in Yunnan

Kaiyuan South 开远南
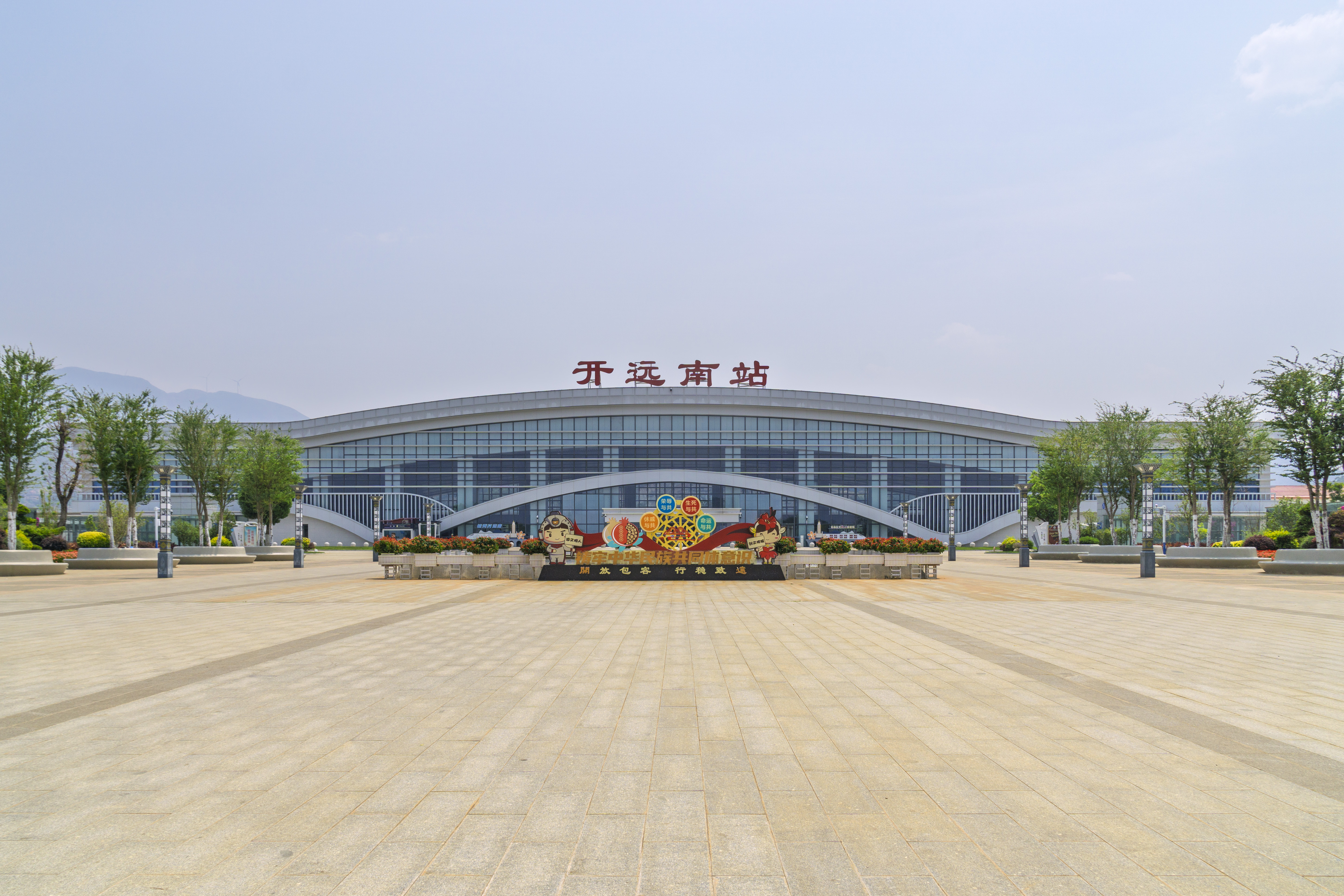

General information
- Location: Kaiyuan, Honghe Hani and Yi Autonomous Prefecture, Yunnan; China
- Coordinates: 23°40′59.01″N 103°16′59.81″E
- Line: Mile–Mengzi high-speed railway

History
- Opened: 16 December 2022
Location

Kaiyuan South railway station (Chinese: 开远南站; pinyin: Kāiyuǎnnán zhàn) is a railway station in Kaiyuan, Honghe Hani and Yi Autonomous Prefecture, Yunnan, China. It is an intermediate station on the Mile–Mengzi high-speed railway.

== History ==
Construction began in July 2020. The station opened on 16 December 2022.

Preceding station	China Railway High-speed	Following station
Pengpu towards Mile	Mile–Mengzi high-speed railway	Honghe Terminus
