= Caoba–Guanjiashan railway =

Railway line in Yunnan, China

Caoba–Guanjiashan railway, or Caoguan railway (Chinese: 草官铁路) is a short 1,000 mm (3 ft 3 3/8 in) railway in Yunnan Province of China, a branch of the 1,000 mm (metre-gauge) Kunming–Hekou railway (the Chinese section of the Kunming–Hai Phong railway). It is 31.9 km long. It connects Caoba station on the Kunming–Hekou railway with Guanjiashan railway station, a dead-end station in Datun Town of Gejiu City. It also serves as the connector between the Kunming–Hekou railway and the Mengzi–Baoxiu railway.

The Caoguan railway is located entirely within the administrative borders of the cities of Mengzi and Gejiu.

== History ==
When the Kunming–Hai Phong railway (opened 1910) was constructed, it did not directly serve the valley where the city of Mengzi is located. The railway was routed east of the city, for a more efficient Hekou to Kunming route. To serve the local administrative center, Mengzi, and the tin mines of Gejiu, in 1915–1921 the local business interests constructed the Bisezhai–Gejiu railway (part of the future Gebishi railway). A 600 mm (1 ft 11 5/8 in) line, it connected with the Kunming–Hai Phong mainline at Bisezhai railway station, east of Mengzi.

The Caoba–Guanjiashan branch was constructed by the PRC Ministry of Metallurgy to server Yunnan Tin's Datun mining area (大屯矿区). The first section of this branch, the 11.3 km segment from Caoba (on the Kunming–Hekou mainline) to Yuguopu railway station (雨过铺站) on the Gebishi railway was constructed in 1958. Yuguopu station became the new transhipment point between the 600 mm Gebishi railway and the metre-gauge network.

In 1965, in connection with the expansion of the Yuguopu station and the construction of the Datun Phosphate Fertilizer Plant (大屯磷肥厂), the line was extended by 1.86 km to Guanshengzhuang (关圣庄). In 1966-1969, the 18.2 km section from Guanshengzhuang to Guanjiashan station was constructed.

The control of the Caoba–Yuguopu section was transferred from the Ministry of Metallurgy to the Kunming Railway Bureau in 1960; in 1970, the Yuguopu–Guanjiashan section was transferred to the Kunming Railway Bureau as well.

After part of the Gebishi railway (the Mengzi–Yuguopu–Jijie–Shiping line, later known as the Mengzi–Baoxiu railway) was regauged to the 1,000 mm gauge in 1970, Yuguopu station ceased to be a transhipment point, becoming a simple junction point between the Caoguan and Gebishi lines.

In 2013, the standard-gauge Yuxi–Mengzi railway reached Mengzi City; the new standard gauge Mengzi North railway station was constructed next to Yuguopu station. A connection between the two stations was set up, providing for transhipment of freight between metre-gauge and standard-gauge trains. Thus the Caoguan-Yuguopo section of the Caoguan line became a connector between Yunnan's century old metre-gauge Kunming–Hekou line and the new standard-gauge Kunming–Yuxi–Hekou railway.

== Literature ==
- 《云南省志 卷三十四 铁道志》 第一章 铁路修建 第二节 蒙宝铁路 ("The Annals of Yunnan Province". Vol. 34, "The Annals of the railways", Chapter 1, "Railway Construction", Section 2, "Mengzi–Baoxiu railway").
