= Central Yunnan Water Diversion Project =

Chinese civil engineering project

- Map of Central Yunnan Water Diversion Project

Location
- Province: Yunnan
- Start: Shigu town, Lijiang
- To: Mengzi

General information
- Type: water
- Status: under construction
- Construction started: August 14, 2017
- Expected: 2025

Technical information
- Length: 664 km (413 mi)
- Maximum discharge: 135 m³/s
- Diameter: 9,830 mm (387 in)

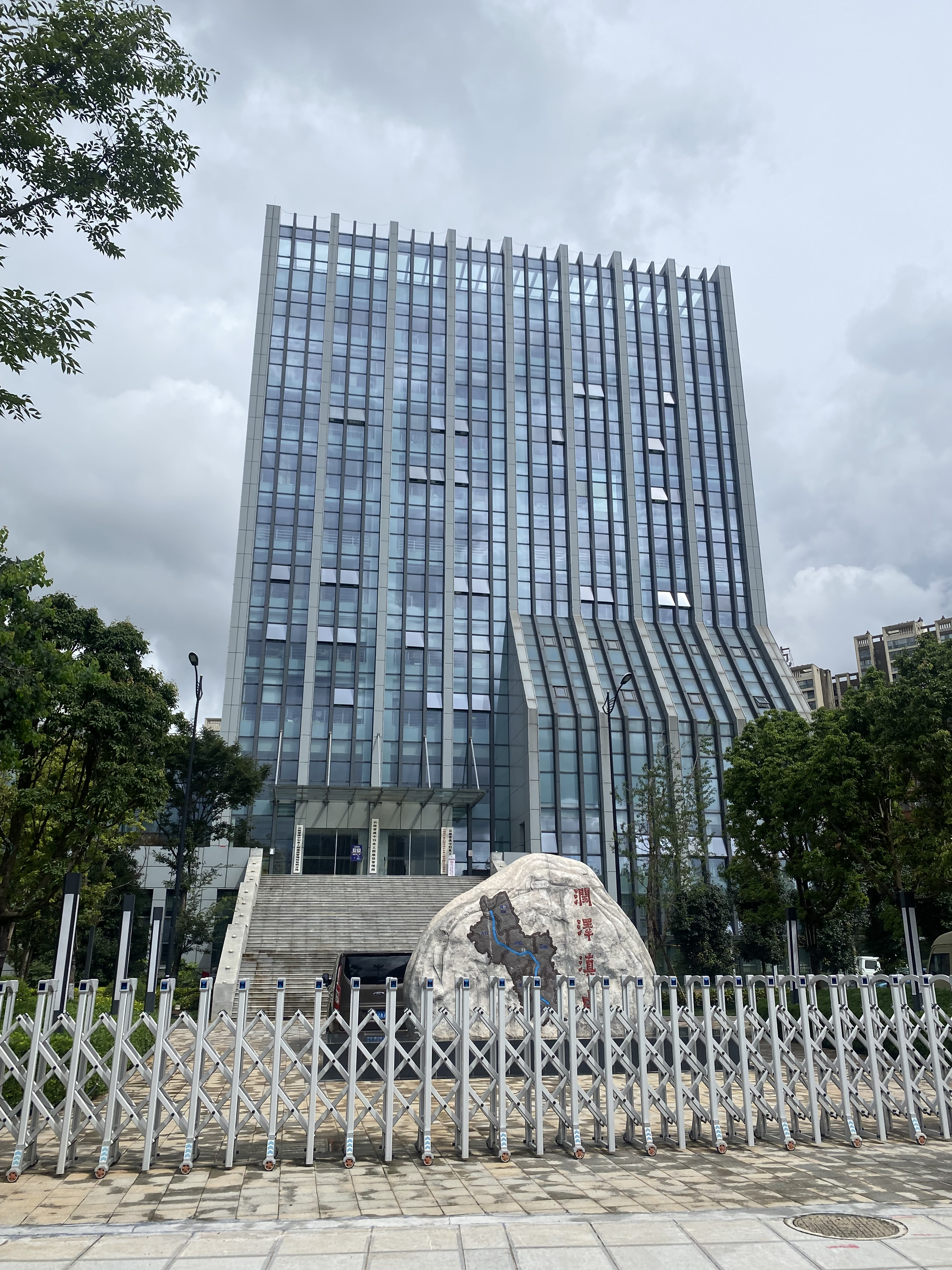
Construction Administration of Central Yunnan Water Diversion Project

The Central Yunnan Water Diversion Project (Chinese: 滇中引水工程; pinyin: Diānzhōng yǐnshuǐ gōngchéng) is a large-scale civil engineering project under construction that will allow water from the Jinsha River near Lijiang to be transported to Central Yunnan. The total length of the water channels will be 664 km (413 mi), of which 612 km (380 mi) will be in tunnels.

The project has a cost of US$ 12.03 billion, largely funded by the Ministry of Water Resources. It is planned for completion by 2026.

== Background ==
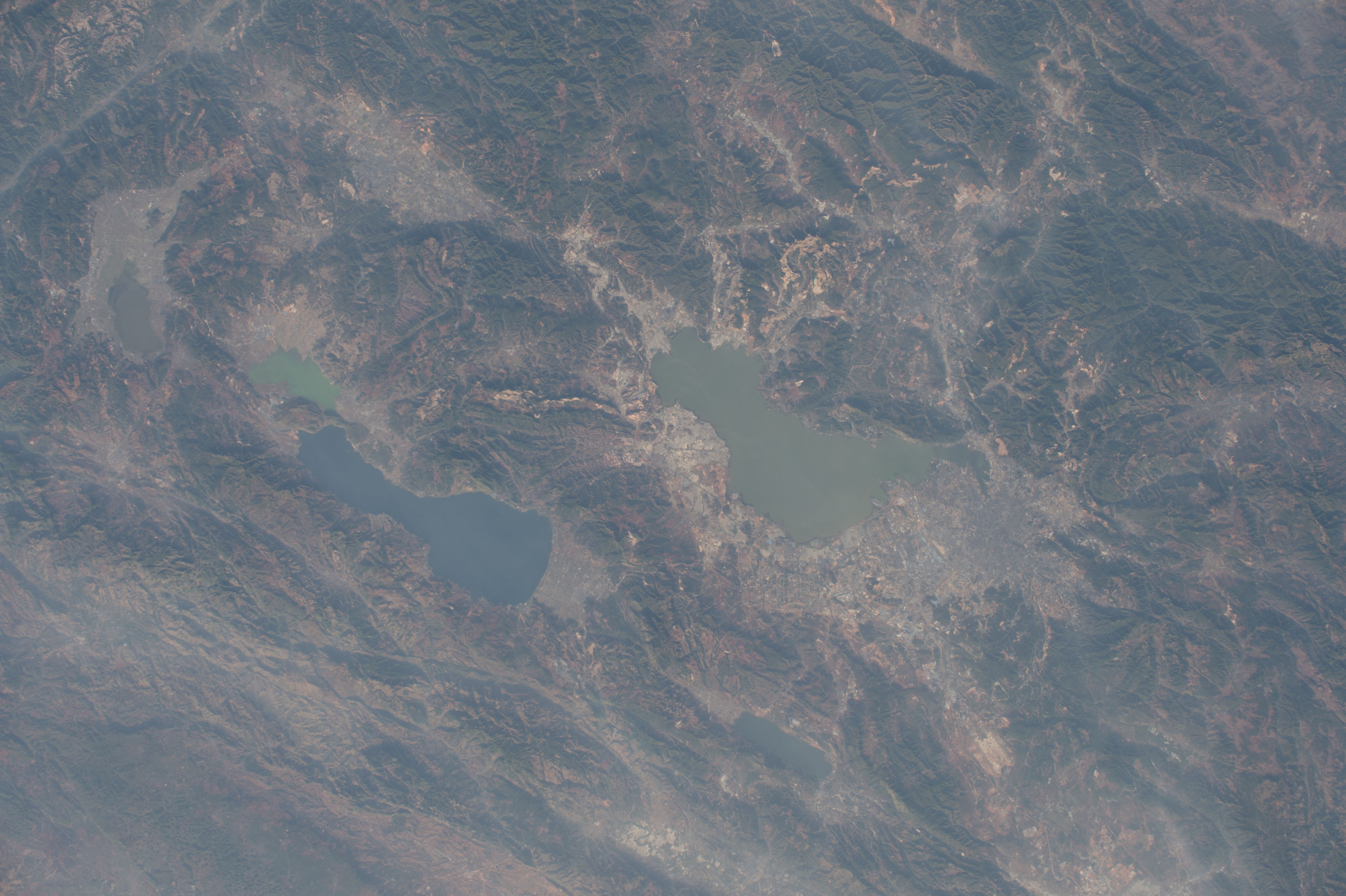
Photo of Kunming, Lake Dian, and Fuxian Lake taken from the ISS. The Lake Dian basin is most affected by water scarcity within the project's scope.

Central Yunnan is a region in China where, currently, only 700 m^{3} (180,000 U.S. gal) of water is available per capita annually, compared to a 1,700 m^{3} (450,000 U.S. gal) recommended minimum. At the same time, Central Yunnan accounts for 68% of Yunnan's GDP. The region has suffered from long drought spells, such as a period of 30 months without heavy rains in Kunming. Water scarcity has been described as the "biggest bottleneck restricting the sustainable development of Central Yunnan." The idea of diverting water from the Jinsha River to Central Yunnan was first proposed by Yunnan's vice-governor Zhang Chong in the 1950s.

The water diversion project was included in the Thirteenth Five-Year Plan. In April 2017, it was approved by the State Council.

== Construction ==
Construction was preceded by 16 years of preliminary work involving studying of the water use of the target area and selecting suitable routes.

Construction commenced on 4 August 2017, with a planned construction time of 8 years. The project includes 58 tunnels with a total length of 612 km (380 mi), 25 inverted siphons, 17 aqueducts, and 15 culverts. 610 km of the length is in tunnels.

The construction is divided into six sections: Dali I, Dali II, Chuxiong, Kunming, Yuxi, and Honghe.

The project will include the world's longest water tunnel, the world's largest underground pump room, and largest pump capacity in Asia. In addition, it deals with challenging geological conditions due to passing through a number of faults. It crosses the four major watersheds of Yunnan: that of the Jinsha River, Mekong, Red River, and Nanpan River, as well as crossing the Hengduan Mountains in northwest Yunnan.

== Impact ==
Once completed, the project would improve water availability for 11 million people, spread over 35 counties in Yunnan and a total area of 36,900 km^{2} (14,200 sq mi). Over 3.403 m^{3} (899 U.S. gal) billion of water would be transported through the channels annually by 2040. This water will be used for domestic and industrial water supply (2.231 m^{3} (589 U.S. gal) million), agricultural water supply (500 m^{3} (130,000 U.S. gal) million), as well as for improving the ecology of lakes in the region (672 m^{3} (178,000 U.S. gal) million).

The designed flow rate of the pipelines is 135 m^{3} (4,800 cu ft) per second.

Since the inlet at the Jinsha River does not include a dam structure, the impact on the source river is expected to be small.

The project is seen as a demonstration project for a future Tibet to Xinjiang water diversion project.

== See also ==
- South–North Water Transfer Project, series of projects diverting water from the Yangtze river to the north of China
