= Neoserica hongheana =

Scientific classification
- Kingdom: Animalia
- Phylum: Arthropoda
- Class: Insecta
- Order: Coleoptera
- Suborder: Polyphaga
- Infraorder: Scarabaeiformia
- Family: Scarabaeidae
- Genus: Neoserica
- Species: N. hongheana

Binomial name
- Neoserica hongheana Ahrens, 2021

Species of beetle

Neoserica hongheana is a species of beetle of the family Scarabaeidae. It is found in China (Yunnan).

== Description ==
Adults reach a length of about 6.5–6.8 mm. They have a black, oval body. The dorsal surface has an iridescent shine and dense, fine, yellowish setae, mixed with dense erect black setae.

== Etymology ==
The species name refers to its occurrence in Honghe prefecture.
