= Mengzi =

Mengzi may refer to:

- Mencius (孟子), 372–289 BCE, Chinese philosopher
  - Mencius (book), a collection of anecdotes and conversations of the philosopher Mencius
- Mengzi City (蒙自), Yunnan, China
