= Honghe Modern Tramway =

Tram

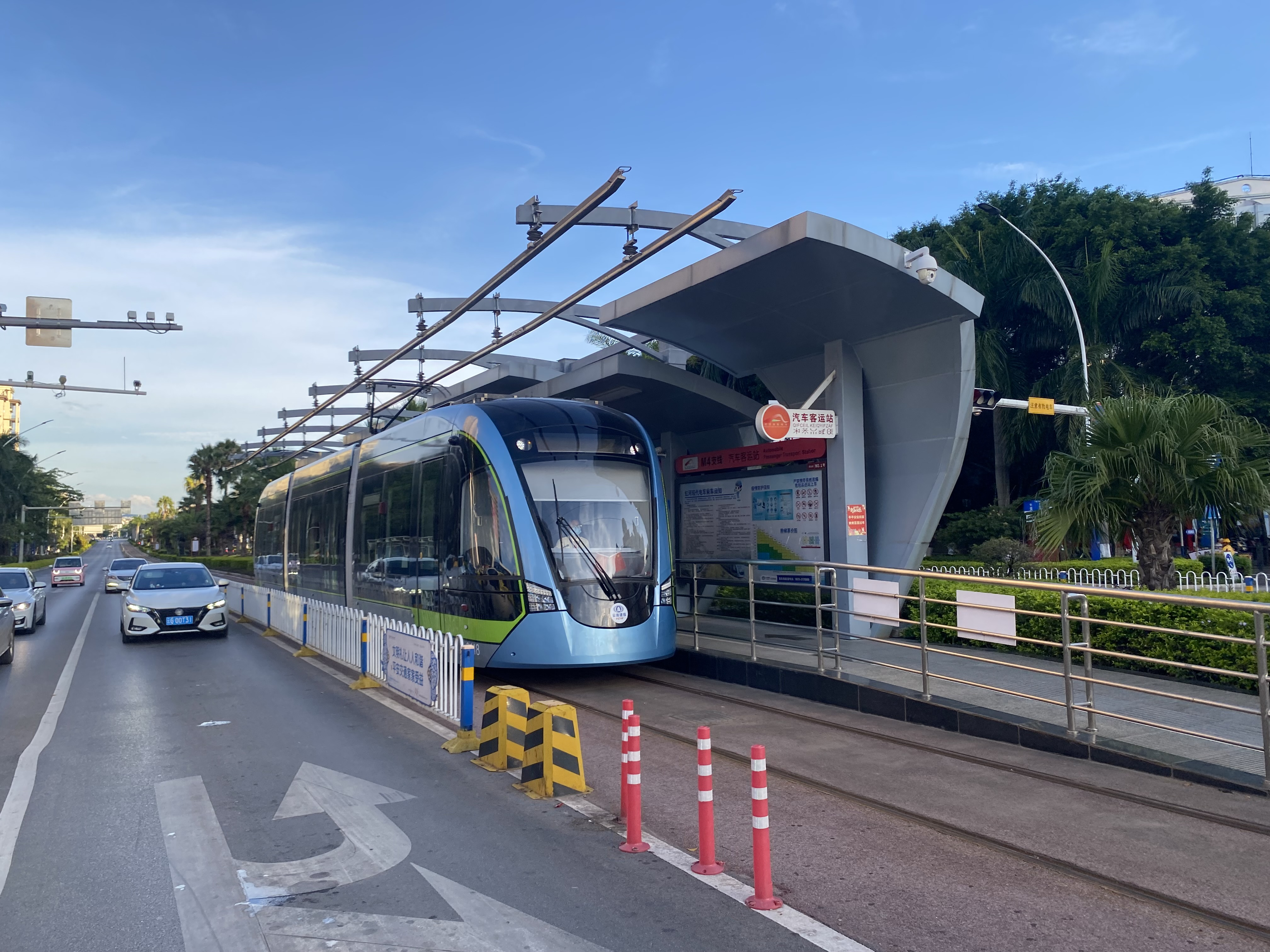
- Honghe Tram at Passenger Transport Station

Operation
- Open: October 1, 2020; 6 years ago
- Status: Operation suspended

Infrastructure
- Track gauge: 1,435 mm (4 ft 8 1/2 in)

Statistics
- Route length: 13.3 km (8 mi)
- Stops: 15

The Honghe Modern Tramway (Chinese: 红河有轨电车) is a tram operating in Mengzi City, Honghe Prefecture, Yunnan Province, China. The rolling stock was provided by CRRC Nanjing Puzhen.

== History ==
Construction began on 6 August 2015.

The project was delayed. Testing began on 21 September 2020. The first line officially opened to the public on 1 October.

On 25 July 2024, Honghe Tram company announced to suspend tram line operation for maintenance.

== Ridership ==
News reports speculated about the tram system shutting down, as it reports one of the lowest passenger numbers of all trams in China. In June 2024 the daily average passenger number amounted to 300, down from 2,000 when the tram first started operation. In 2022, the tram operations recorded an 80 million yuan loss.

== Route ==
The line runs south from Mengzi North railway station.

== See also ==
- Zhuhai tram, tram system dismantled after low ridership
- Tianshui tram, tram system is also facing low ridership
