= Luoshuidong railway station =

Luoshuidong railway station may refer to:

- Luoshuidong railway station (Hubei), on the Yichang−Wanzhou Railway in Hubei, China
- Luoshuidong railway station (Yunnan), in Mengzi, Yunnan, China.
