= Honghe Hani Rice Terraces =

Cultural Landscape of Honghe Hani Rice Terraces
UNESCO World Heritage Site
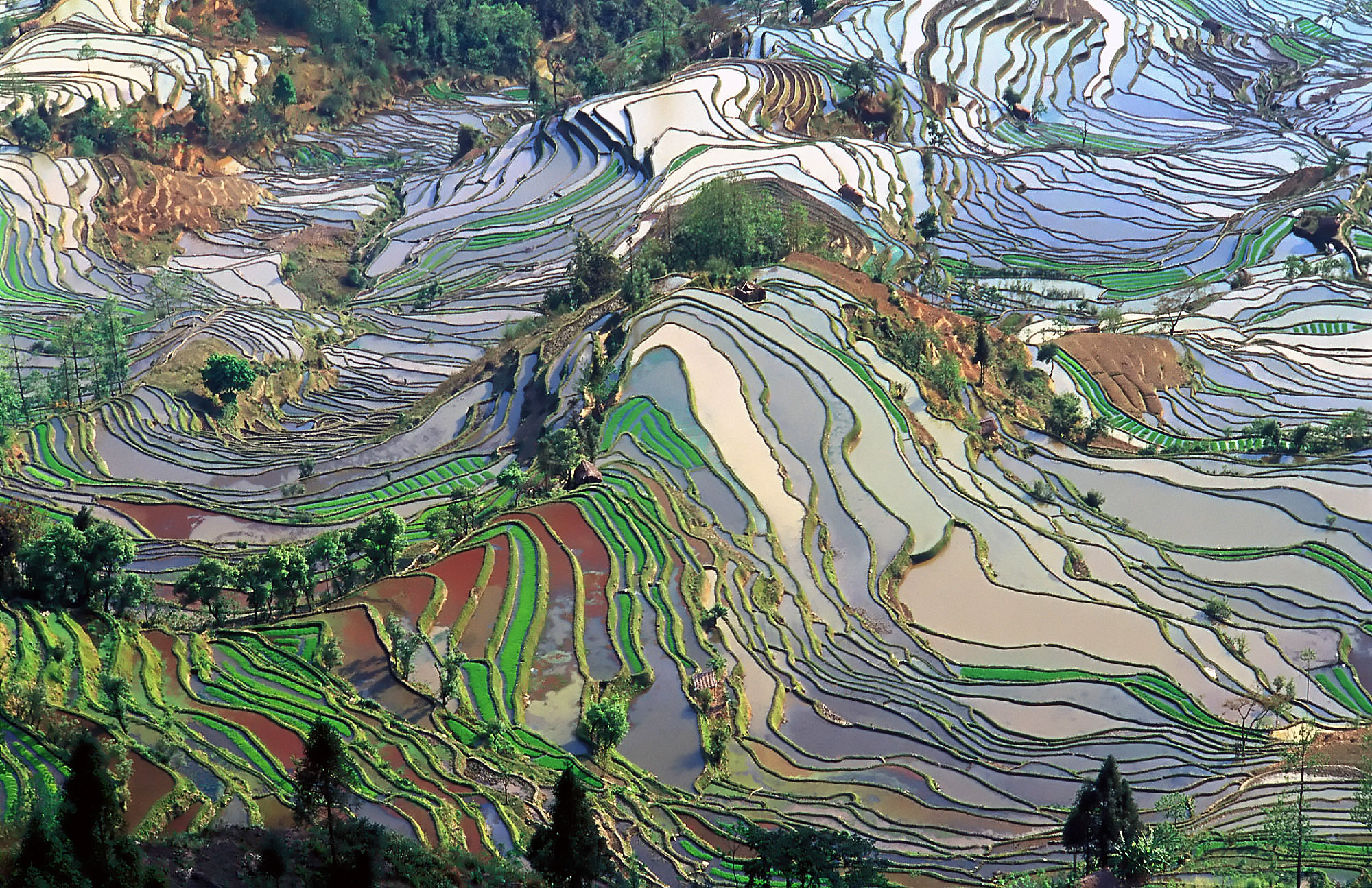
- The terraces in Yuanyang County

- Location within Yunnan Location within China
- Location: Honghe Hani and Yi Autonomous Prefecture, Yunnan, China
- Criteria: Cultural: (iii), (v)
- Reference: 1111
- Inscription: 2013 (37th Session)
- Area: 16,603.22 ha (41,027.5 acres)
- Buffer zone: 29,501.01 ha (72,898.6 acres)
- Coordinates: 23°05′35.8″N 102°46′47.9″E

The Honghe Hani Rice Terraces are the system of Hani rice-growing terraces located in Yuanyang County, Honghe Prefecture, Yunnan, China. The terraces' history spans around 1,200 years. The total area stretches across 1,000,000 acres and four counties: Yuanyang, Honghe, Jinpin and Lüchun, although the core area of the terraces is located in Yuanyang County. In 2013, 16,603 hectares of the Honghe Hani Rice Terraces were listed as a World Heritage Site, because of their outstanding resilient construction, unique social-ecological system, and importance to the Hani people.

== Description ==
The Honghe Hani Rice Terraces are located on the southern banks of the Hong River, below the Ailao Mountains in southern Yunnan. The rough, mountainous terrain and high annual rainfall led to the creation of a complex terrace system for growing rice, with some locations having over 3000 terraces between the edge of the forest and the valley floor. Irrigation channels and artificial aquifers made out of sandstone distribute the water across the landscape. This system has been continually maintained and operated by the Hani people for over 1,300 years. The cultivation of rice is an important part of the Hani culture, theology, calendar, and political system.

The terraces follow a distinct vertical structure that has allowed the landscape to persist for so long, incorporating forests, villages, terraces, and water supply. At the tops of the mountains (above 2000 meters in elevation), the forests are conserved, to act as a catchment for the rainfall and to "recharge" the fields and terraces below. An intricate system of canals and ditches diverts the water into the terraces below. The villages in the region are usually constructed just below the forests, between 1400 and 2000 m. In the World Heritage Site, 82 villages, each with 50–100 households, are protected. The buildings are usually made of adobe and stone. Each household farms one or two terrace plots below, usually growing red rice and breeding cattle.

== Gallery ==
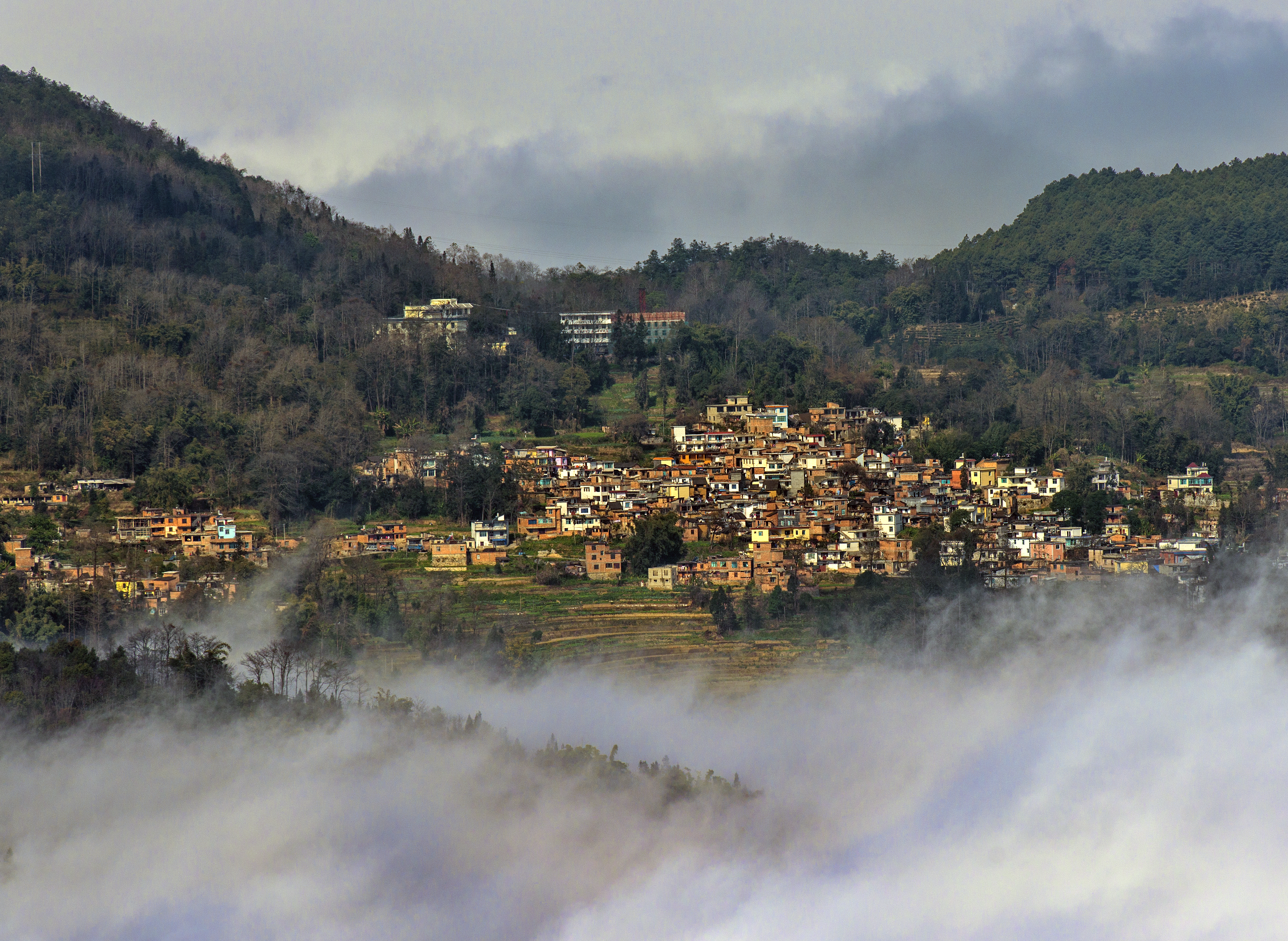

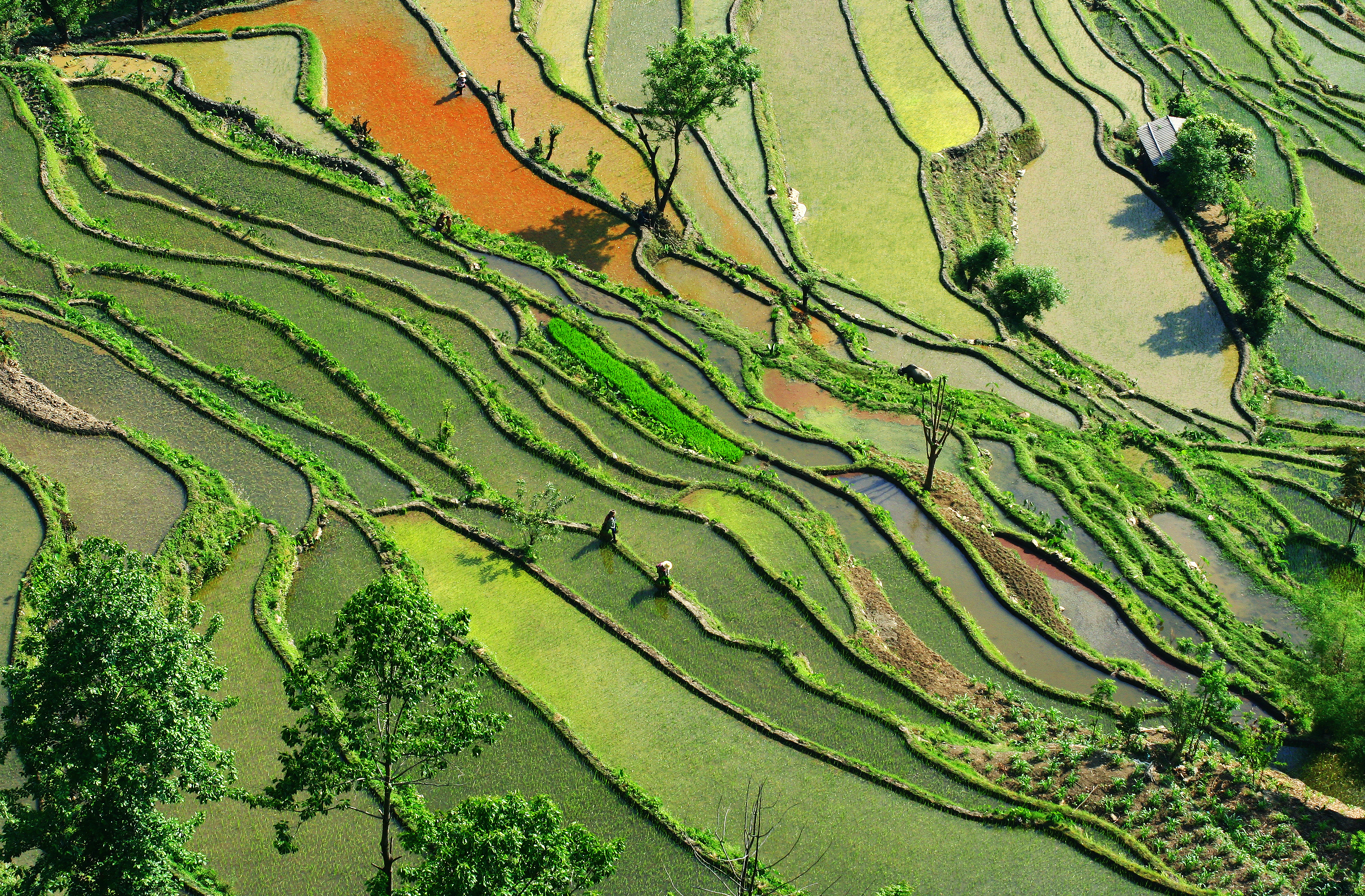

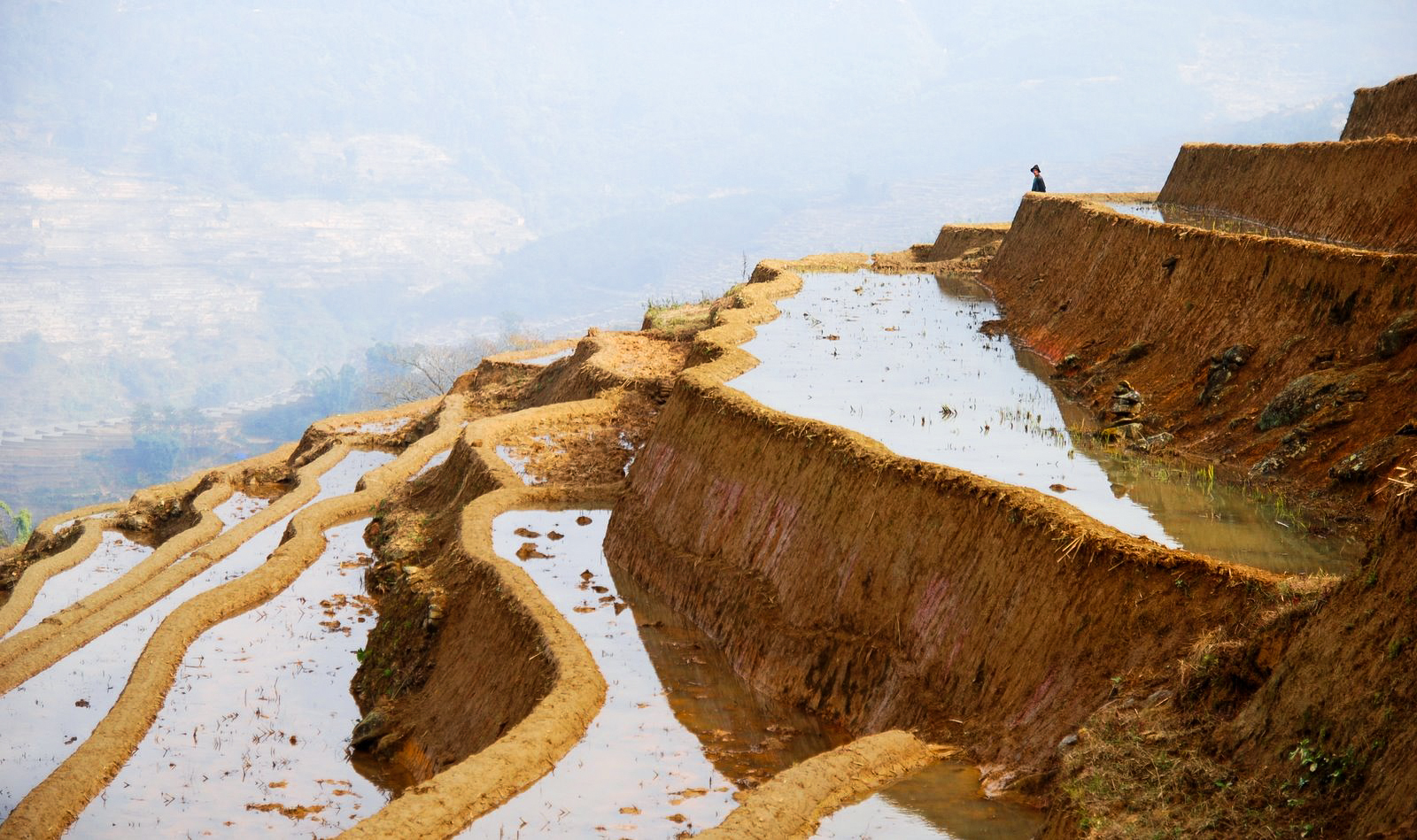

== See also ==
- Rice Terraces of the Philippine Cordilleras
