= Honghe Mengzi Airport =

Honghe Mengzi Airport 红河蒙自机场
- IATA: HMZ; ICAO: none

Summary
- Airport type: Public / military
- Serves: Mengzi, Honghe
- Location: Daguoxi Village, Yuguopu Town
- Interactive map of Honghe Mengzi Airport

Honghe Mengzi Airport is an under-construction dual-use military and civil airport being built in Mengzi City, capital of the Honghe Hani and Yi Autonomous Prefecture in China's southwestern Yunnan province near the Vietnamese border. The airport is located in Daguoxi Village (大郭西村), Yuguopu Subdistrict (雨过铺).

== History ==
The airport was first proposed in 1999, but was repeatedly delayed due to complications with the military Mengzi Air Base. On October 9, 2012, the project finally gained approvals from the State Council and the Central Military Commission of China, with the decision to build a dual-use airport to replace the existing air base. Construction was expected to begin by the end of 2012, with a total investment of 3 billion yuan. Construction started on November 17, 2020.

== See also ==
- List of airports in China
- List of the busiest airports in China
- List of People's Liberation Army Air Force airbases
