= Mile–Mengzi high-speed railway =

Railway line in Yunnan, China

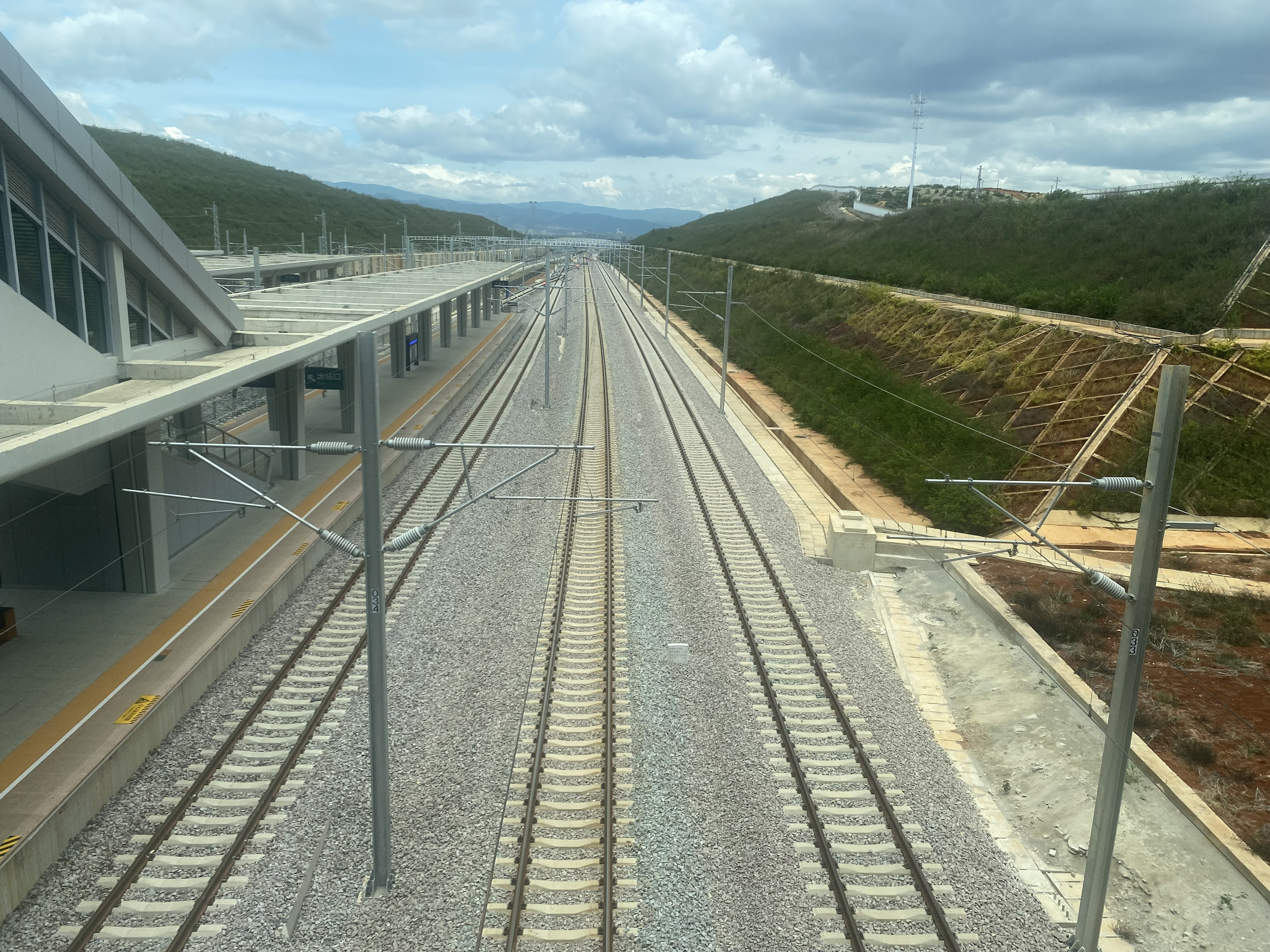
Main line of Mile–Mengzi high-speed railway at the Honghe railway station

The Mile–Mengzi high-speed railway or Mimeng HSR (Chinese: 弥蒙铁路; pinyin: Míméng tiělù) is a high-speed railway line in Honghe, Yunnan, China. It is operated by China Railway Kunming Group. It is the first high-speed railway line which runs entirely in an autonomous prefecture in mainland China (PRC).

== History ==
Construction officially started on 30 May 2018. The railway opened on 16 December 2022.

== Specification ==
The line splits from the Nanning–Kunming high-speed railway south of Mile railway station. It ends at Honghe railway station. It is approximately 106 kilometres (66 mi) long and has a maximum speed of 250 kilometres per hour (160 mph).

== Stations ==
There are 5 stations on the railway: Mile, Zhuyuan, Pengpu, Kaiyuan South and Honghe.
