= Gebishi railway =

Railway line in Yunnan, China

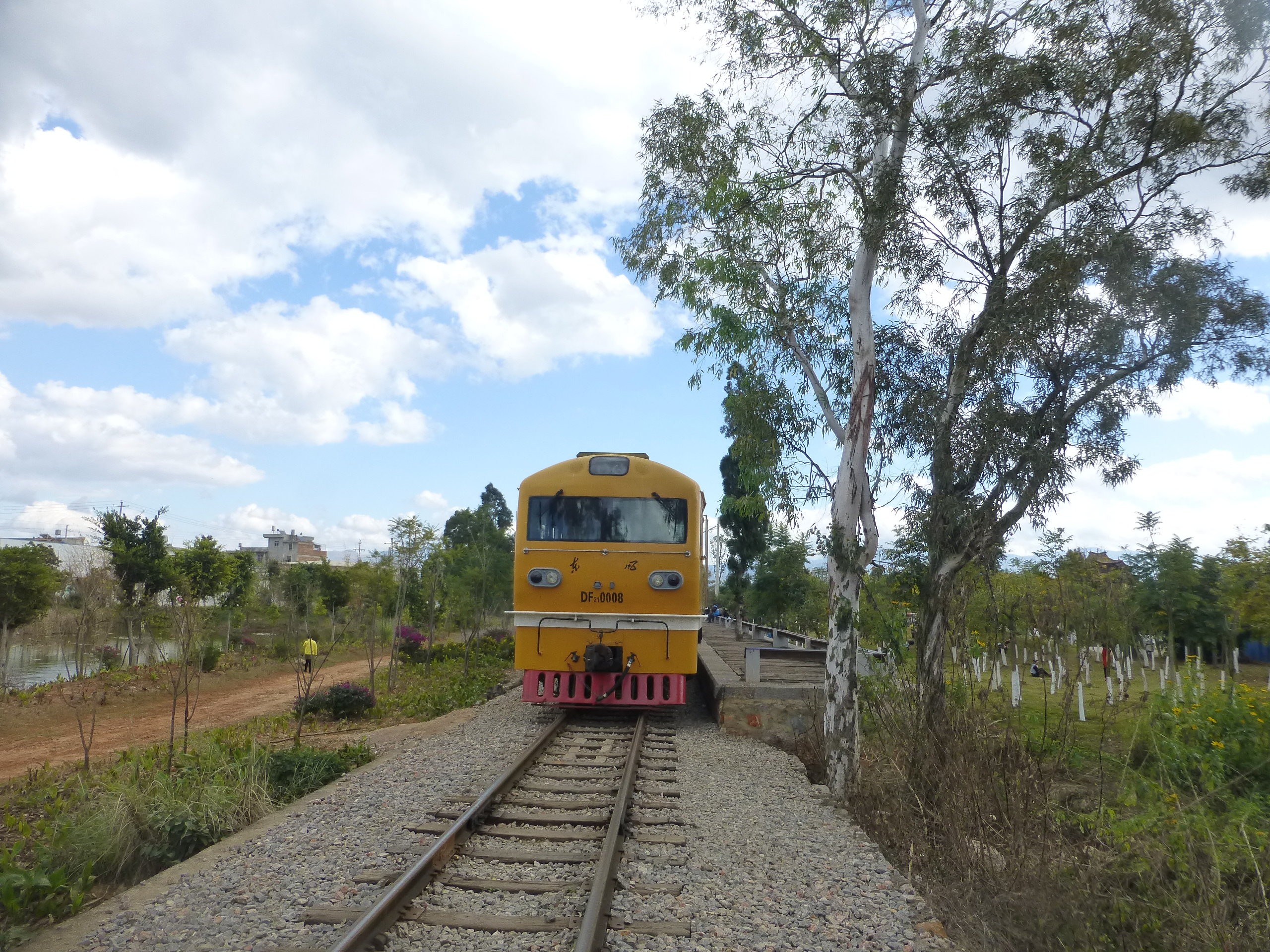
An excursion train at Shuanglongqiao station, west of Lin'an (2016)

The Gebishi railway (Chinese: 个碧石铁路; pinyin: Gè-Bì-Shí tiělù), or Gejiu–Bisezhai–Shiping Railway was a 600 mm (1 ft 11 5/8 in) gauge railway that connected Gejiu City and Shiping County with the only existing 1,000 mm (3 ft 3 3/8 in) metre gauge mainline in China, the Kunming–Hekou railway. Parts of this railway have been removed; the remaining part, which has been regauged to the 1,000 mm gauge, still exists as the 143 km (89 mi) long Mengbao (Mengzi–Baoxiu) railway.

== History ==
=== The growth of the system ===
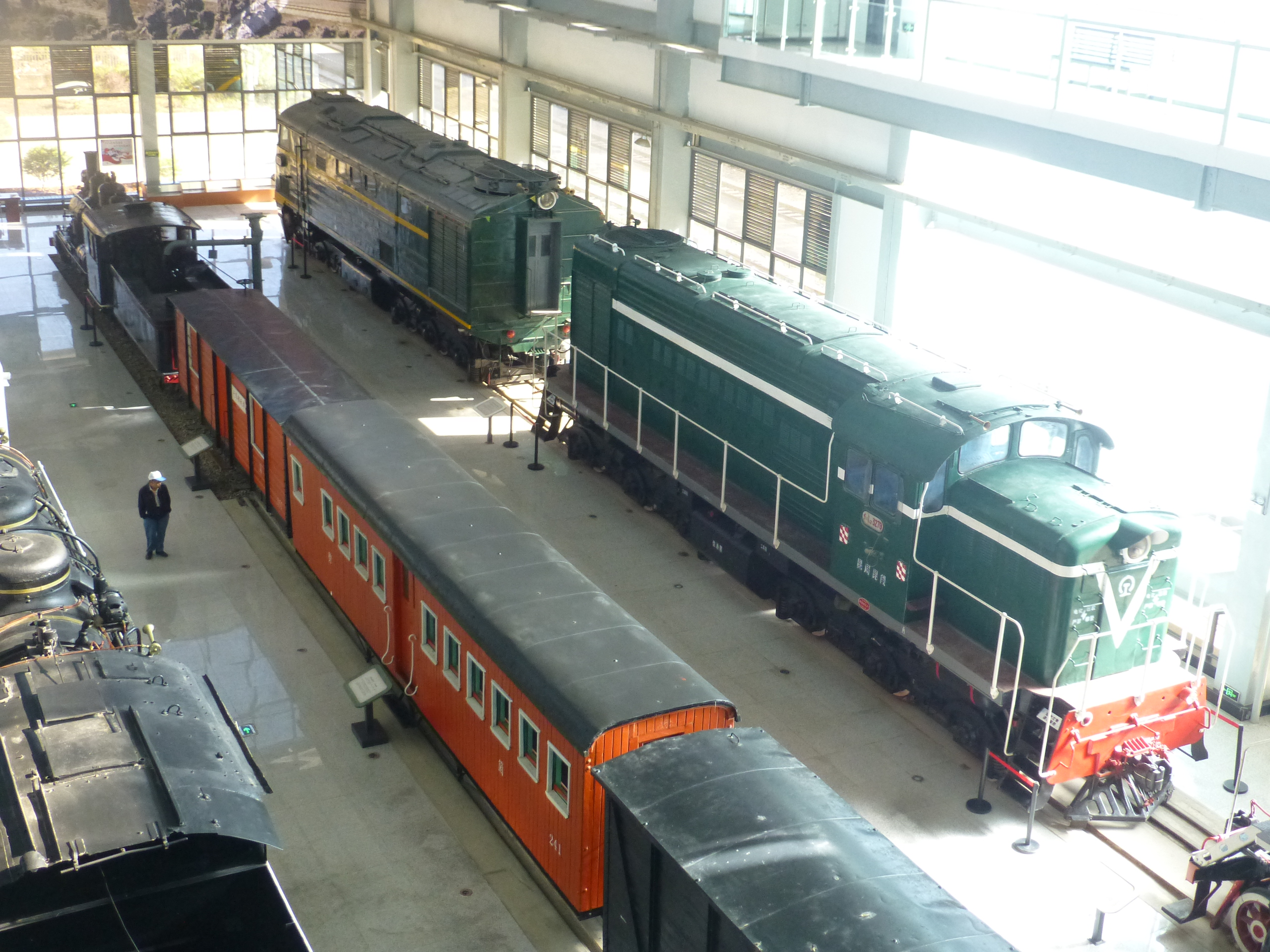
Some of the original 600 mm gauge rolling stock from the Gebishi railway (a locomotive, two mail/luggage cars, and a boxcar) on display in the Yunnan Railway Museum (middle row)

Plans for the construction of a railway to the tin mines of Gejiu were first made in 1913, just 3 years after the opening of the metre-gauge Kunming–Hai Phong railway (whose Chinese section is known as the Kunming–Hekou railway).

The construction of the Bisezhai–Gejiu railway started on May 15, 1915 using Decauville equipment. The route required eight tunnels as long as 2,296 feet (700 m) with 3 percent grades and 28-degree curves (206.68 ft or 63.00 m radius). In November 1918, the first section of this railway, from Bisezhai (the connecting point to the Kunming–Hekou railway) to Jijie station (鸡街站, in Jijie Town of Gejiu City) opened. On November 9, 1921, the 34.1 km section from Jijie to Gejiu (the Jijie–Gejiu railway, 鸡个铁路) opened as well.

In 1922, construction work started on a branch that ran from Jijie to Lin'an Town (the county seat of Jianshui County). It ran in the general western direction, along the Lin'an River. This branch opened in November 1928. In 1931, work started on a further western extension, from Lin'an to Shiping; it opened on October 10, 1936, the railway thus acquiring its "Gebishi" (Gejiu–Bisezhai–Shiping) configuration. Gejiu Tin-Mining Company freight required 33-pound-per-yard (16.4 kg/m) rail. At the time of construction it was the only private railway in China, and was later nationalised and merged into China’s national railways.

In 1959, a new metre-gauge branch was constructed from Caoba station on the Kunming–Hekou railway to Yuguopu railway station (雨过铺站) of the Gebishi railway (located on the north side of Mengzi City, between Bisezhai and Jijie). Yuguopu then became the new transhipment point between the 600 mm gauge Gebishi railway and Yunnan's metre-gauge rail network, while the old, less conveniently located connection at Bisezhai fell into disuse. Not needed anymore, the easternmost end of the Bisezhai–Jijie line, from Bisezhai to Mengzi, was removed in 1960–1962. The track removed from the eastern end of the line was used to construct a new extension at its western end, from Shiping to Baoxiu (宝秀; also within Shiping County), in order to provide rail access to the new Longkouchong iron ore mine (龙口冲铁矿). This Shiping–Baoxiu extension was opened in August 1965.

=== The gauge conversion on the Mengbao line ===
In 1967–1969, plans were worked out for the regauging of the Mengzi–Jijie–Shiping–Baoxiu Line (the 143 km long Mengbao Line) to the 1,000 mm gauge, to enable direct railcar interchange with the Kunming–Hekou mainline (via Yuguopo station and the Caoba–Guanjiashan branch). The reconstruction was to also improve the track layout, the 100 m (330 ft) curve radius being increased to 250 m (820 ft). 38 kg/m (76.6 lb/yd) rail was to be used for the new tracks. KD_{55} steam locomotives were to be used to pull trains on it. Jijie would become the transhipment point between the Jijie–Gejiu branch (the last remaining 600 mm section of the original Gebishi system) and the 1,000 mm network, with the capacity to process up to 300,000 metric tons of freight per year.

The regauging project started on January 1, 1970, using rails end equipment moved from other, recently torn down, metre-gauge lines in Yunnan. On October 1, 1970, the first train ran the entire length of the converted Mengabo line; the project was fully completed in May 1971, at the cost of 15 million yuan (105,000 yuan per km). In 1977, the Mengbao line was converted from the manual blocking to the semi-automatic blocking.

=== The abandonment of the Jijie–Gejiu branch ===
In 1977–1978, plans were worked out by the Kunming Railway Bureau and the Ministry of Railways for the conversion of the Jijie–Gejiu branch to the metre gauge as well. However, they were never implemented.

In 1985, only two stations remained in operation on the Gejiu branch; the passenger service ended.

In August 1991, all service on the Jijie–Gejiu branch stopped. The tracks were removed in 2008.

=== The Mengbao line today ===
In 2003, passenger service on the Mengbao line was terminated. In February 2010, freight service west of Lin'an Town (Jiashui County seat) ceased as well.

More recently, the Mengbao line became viewed as a heritage object, with a tourist potential. Since 2015, an excursion train called, in English, Jianshui Old Train, or in Chinese 建水古城小火车 (Jianshui Gu Cheng Xiao Huoche, i.e. "Jianshui Old City Small Train"), has been running between Lin'an station and Tuanshan station, 12.82 km to the west.

The new standard-gauge Yuxi–Mengzi railway, opened in 2013, serves both Lin'an Town (Jianshui station) and Mengzi City. Between these two cities it follows a route that is fairly similar to that of the narrow-gauge Mengbao line, but is straighter, due to greater use of tunnels and elevated sections.

== Locomotives ==
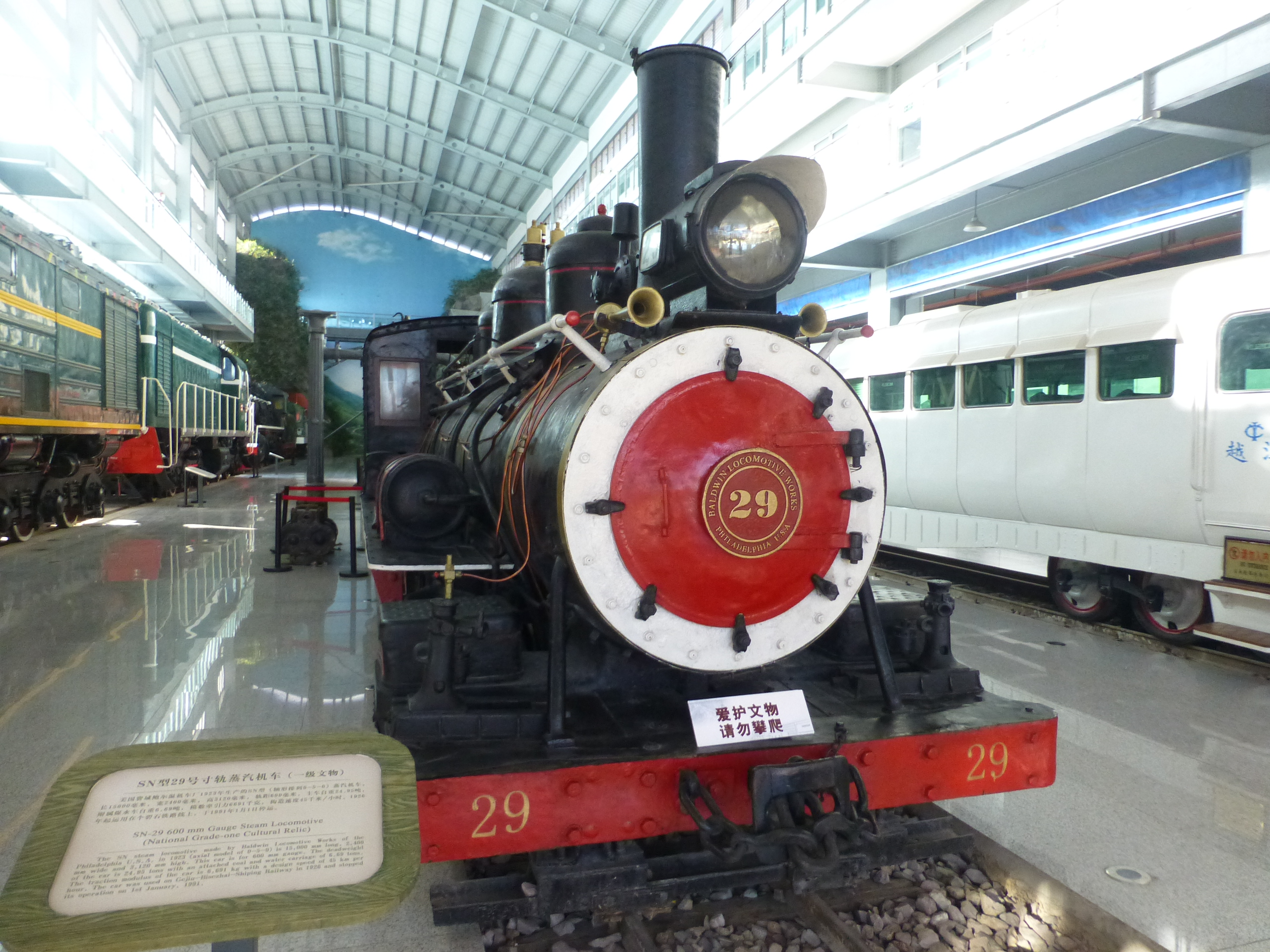
Baldwin SN-29 from the Gebishi railway on display in the Yunnan Railway Museum

Baldwin Locomotive Works built sixteen 0-10-0 locomotives for the line between 1924 and 1929. These locomotives remained operational until the branch was closed in 1990. Baldwin locomotive number 23 was preserved and is currently displayed in the China Railway Museum; No. 29 is in Yunnan Railway Museum.

== Literature ==
- 《云南省志 卷三十四 铁道志》 第一章 铁路修建 第二节 蒙宝铁路 ("The Annals of Yunnan Province". Vol. 34, "The Annals of the Railways", Chapter 1, "Railway Construction", Section 2, "Mengzi–Baoxiu Railway").
