= Mengzi City =

Mengzi 蒙自市 · Maoqziif Siif
- County-level city
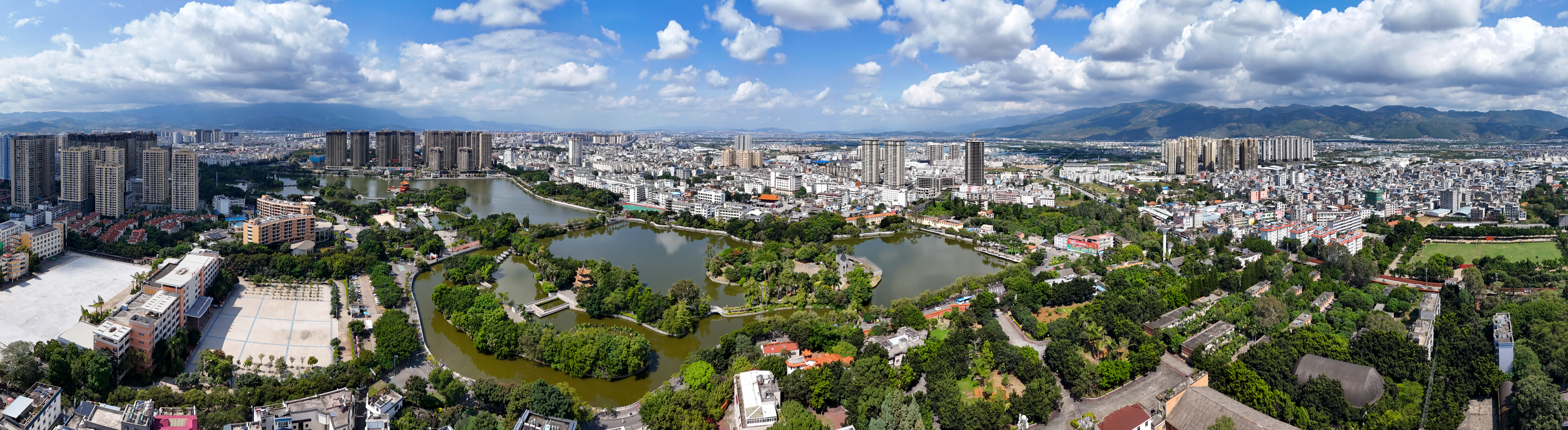
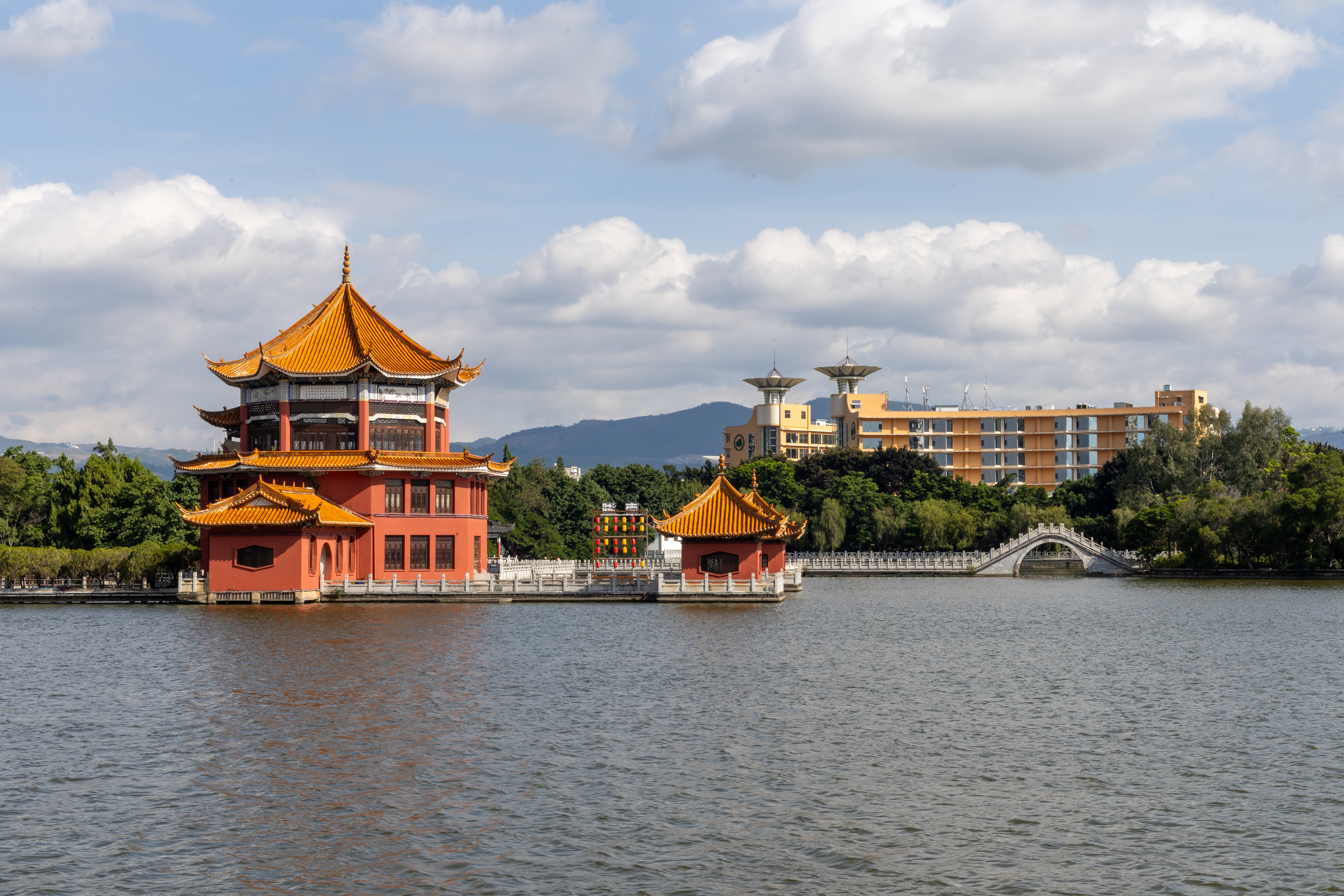
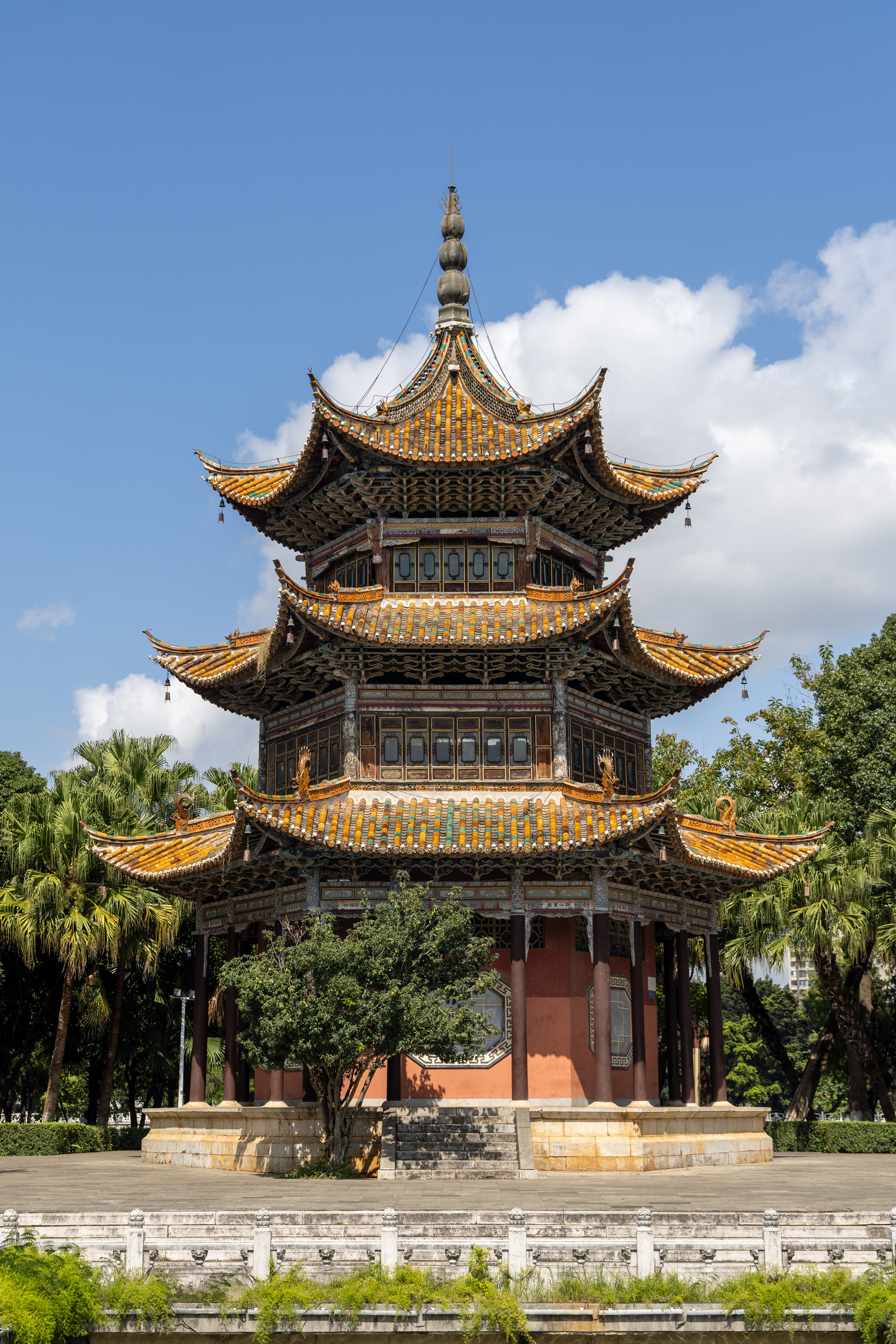
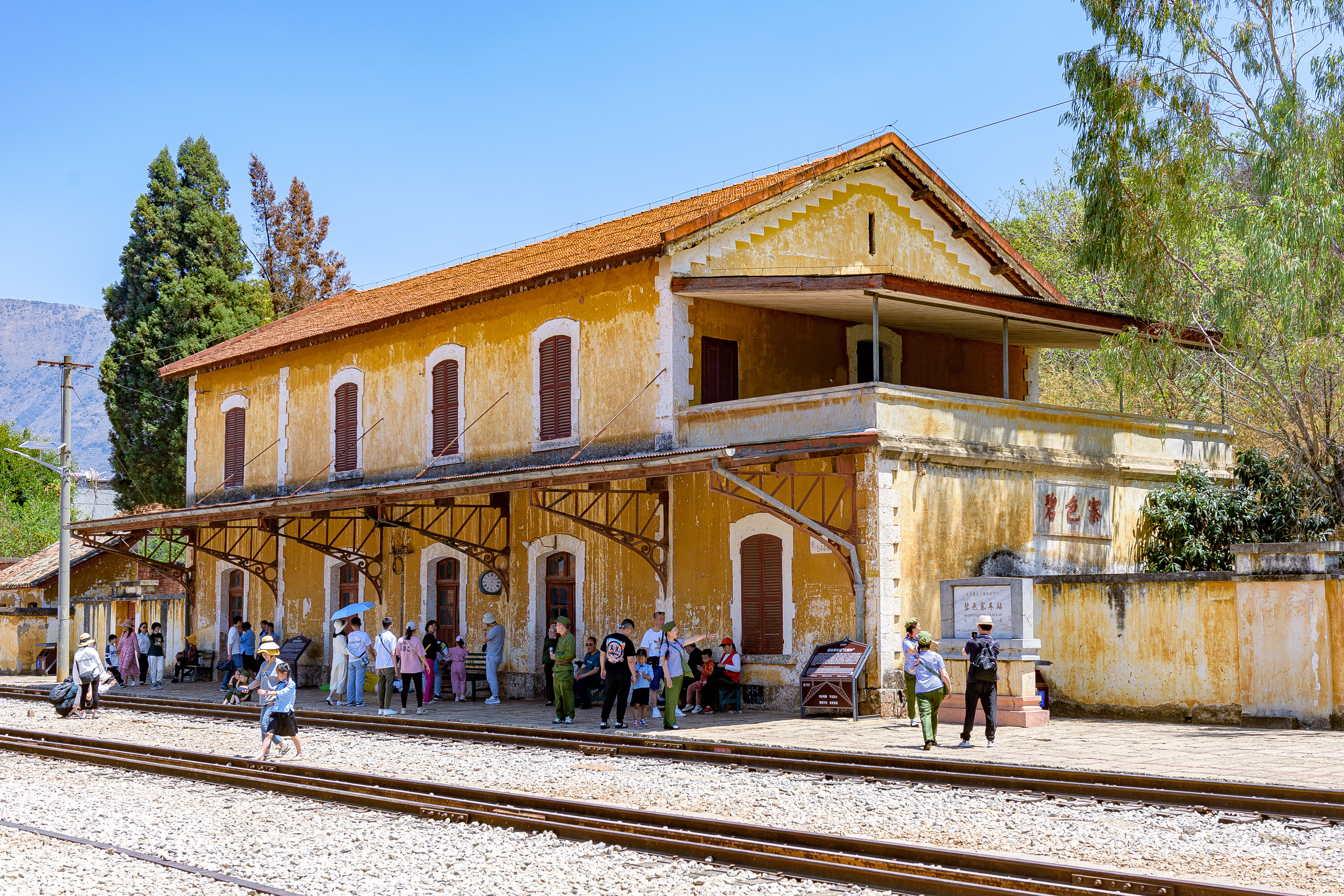
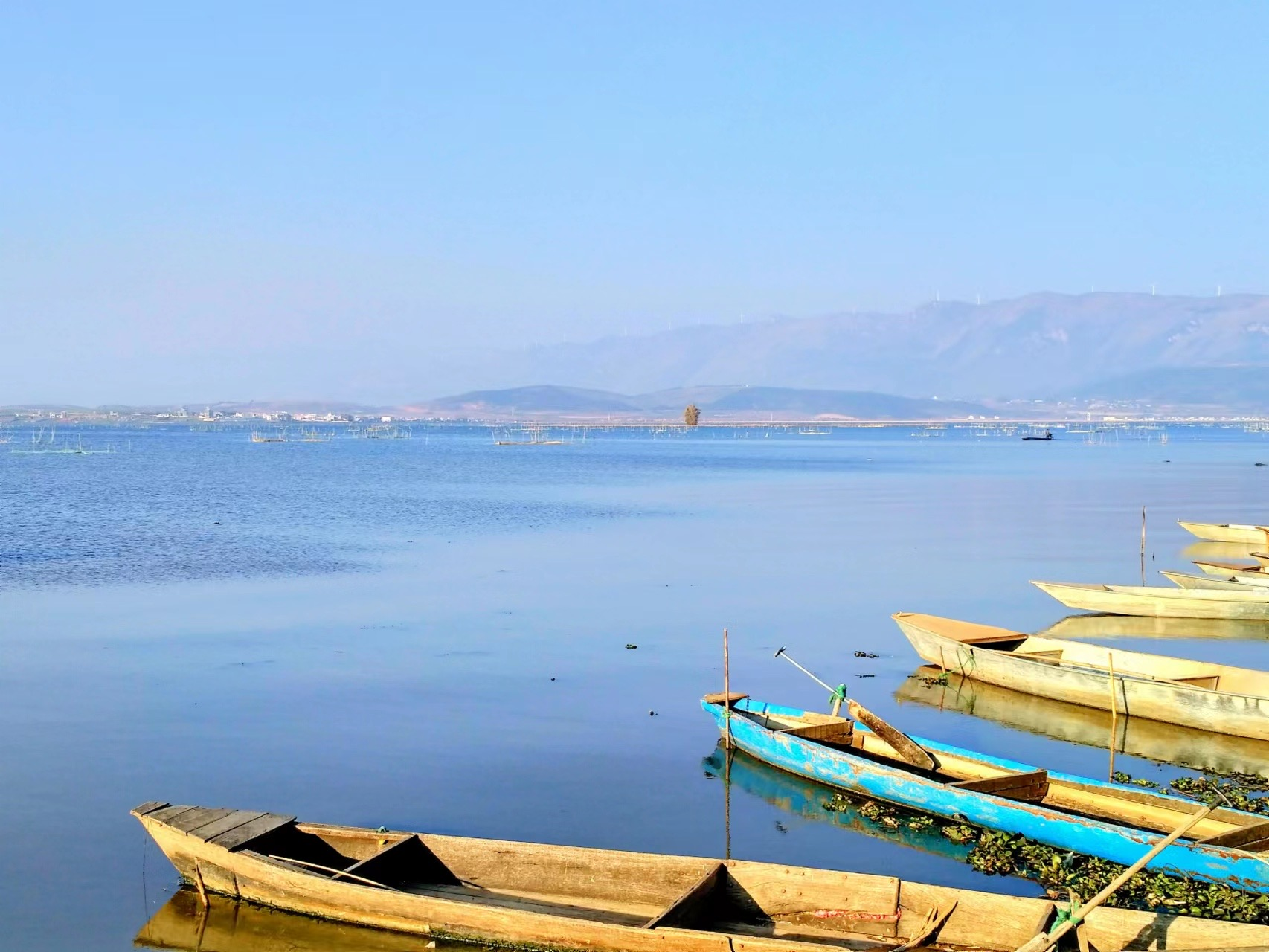
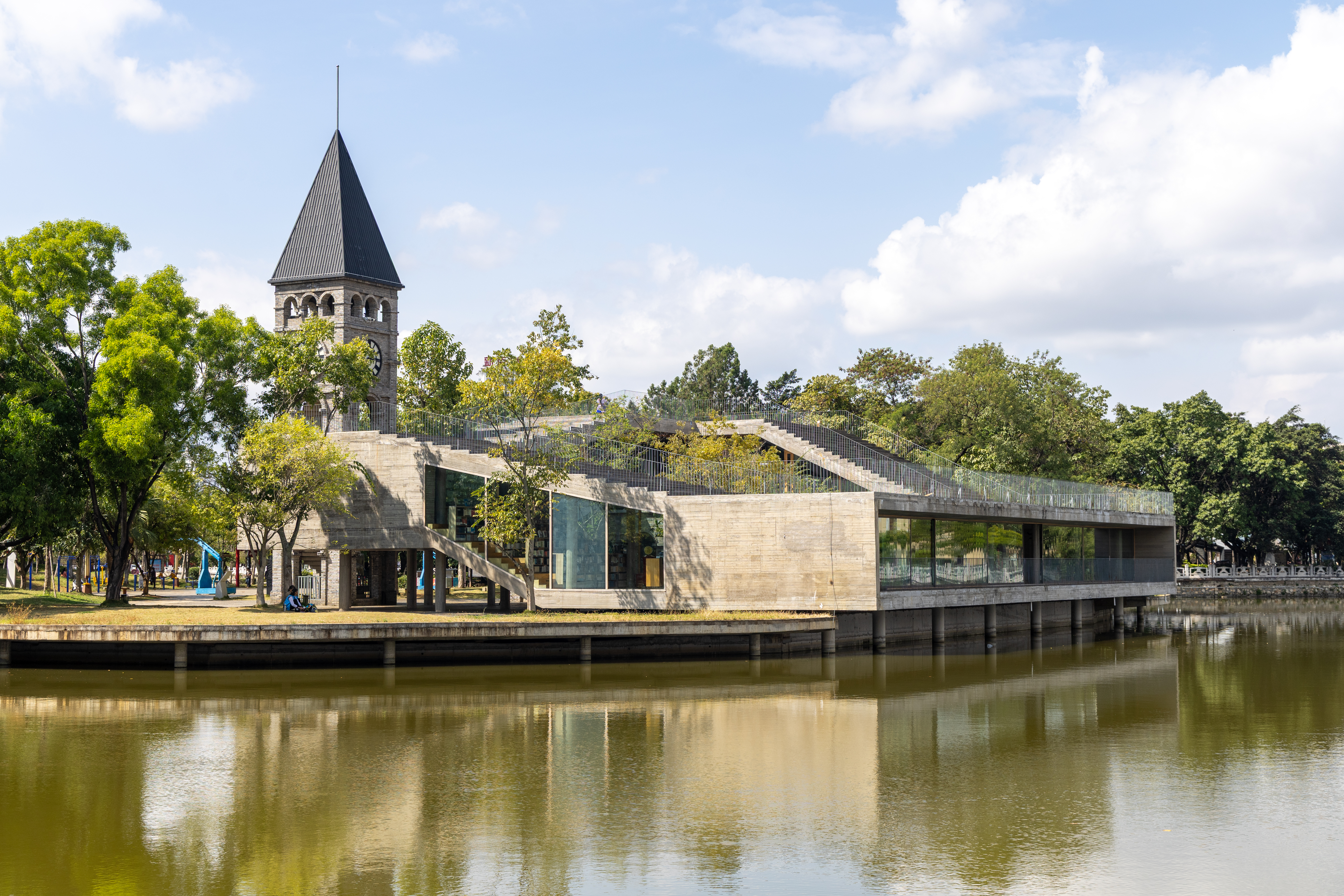
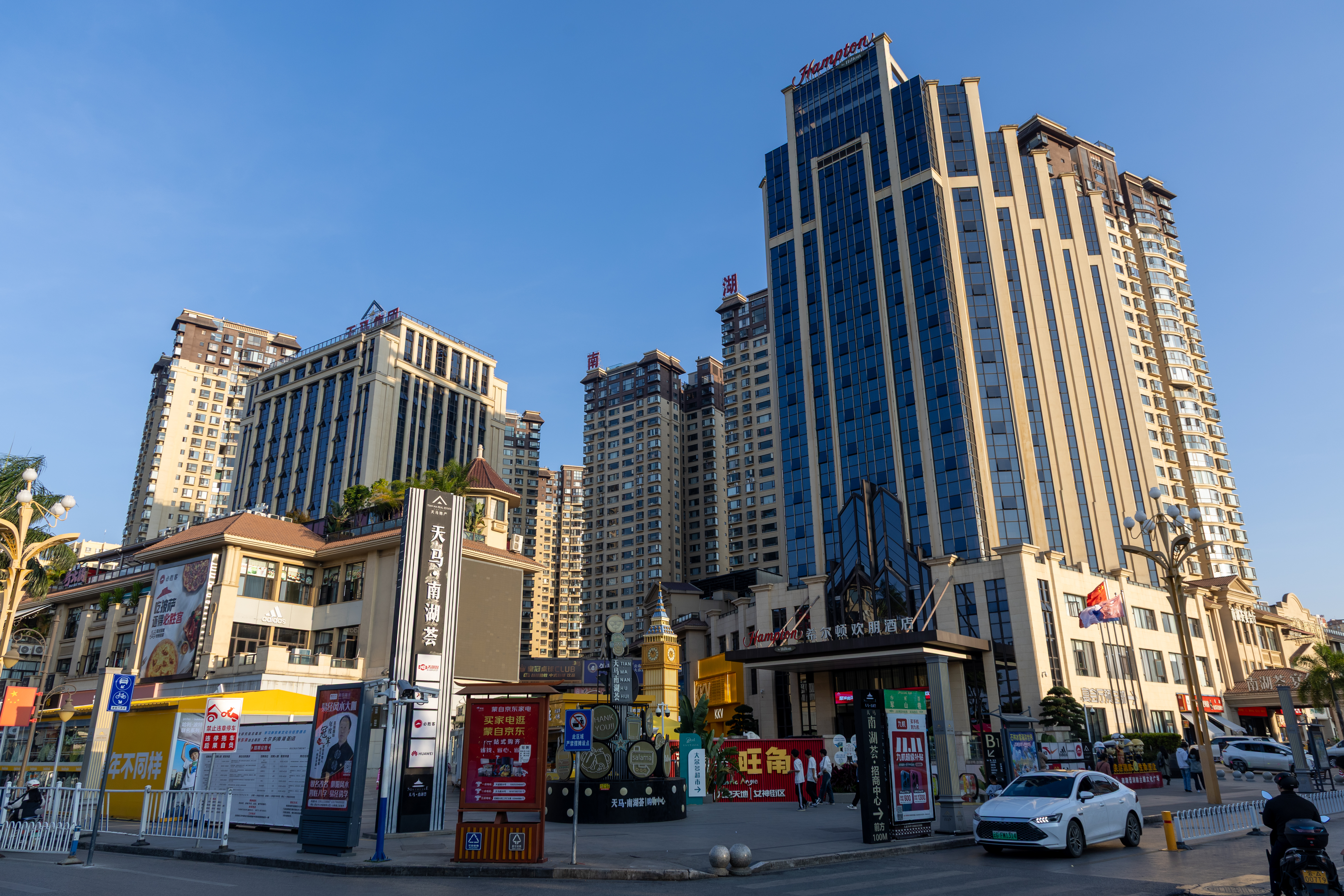
- Skyline of Mengzi South Lake Yingzhou Pavilion Bisezhai Railway Station Changqiao Lake NSAU Bookstore South Lake Shopping Center

- Location of Mengzi City in Honghe Prefecture within Yunnan province

- Location in Yunnan Mengzi (China)
- Coordinates (Mengzi City government): 23°23′46″N 103°21′54″E
- Country: China
- Province: Yunnan
- Autonomous prefecture: Honghe
- Municipal seat: Guanlan Subdistrict

Area
  - Total: 2,172 km^{2} (839 sq mi)
- Elevation: 1,310 m (4,300 ft)

Population (2020 census)
  - Total: 585,976
  - Density: 269.8/km^{2} (698.7/sq mi)
- Time zone: UTC+8 (China Standard)
- Postal code: 661100
- Area code: 0873
- Climate: Cwa
- Website: www.hhmz.gov.cn

Mengzi (Chinese: 蒙自; pinyin: Méngzì; Hani: Maoqziif Siif) is a city in the southeast of Yunnan Province, China. Administratively, it is a county-level city and the prefectural capital of the Honghe Hani and Yi Autonomous Prefecture, located about 243 kilometres (151 mi) southeast from Kunming, and 400 kilometres northwest from Hanoi, Vietnam. It is situated in the centre of a fertile valley basin on the Yunnan-Guizhou Plateau 1,310 metres (4,300 ft) above the sea level and was home to about 590,300 inhabitants as of 2021 census. Mengzi was formerly Mengzi County (蒙自县) until October 2010, when it was upgraded to a county-level city. Mengzi is the core area of South Yunnan Central City Cluster, which is officially regarded as the political, economic, cultural, and military centre of South Yunnan.

Mengzi City borders Wenshan City to the east, Gejiu, Pingbian County, Jinping County and Yuanyang County, Yunnan to the south, Gejiu to the west, and Kaiyuan, Yunnan and Yanshan County, Yunnan to the north.

== Name ==
=== The origin of the name ===
A widely accepted statement is that the name "Mengzi" (蒙自) was originated from Muze Mountain (now named as Lianhua Mountain) located in the west of Mengzi and now belongs to Gejiu. In Yi language, Muze Mountain means a towering mountain.

=== The romanized spelling ===
As with many other places in China, a variety of Romanized spellings were used for the name of Mengzi city in the past. The traditional French spelling was Mongtseu; the postal, Mengtsz, Mengtzu or Mongtze. Some works in English used the spelling Mêng-tse or Mengtsze.

== Government ==
The municipal seat is in Guanlan Subdistrict.

== Administrative divisions ==
At present, Mengzi City has 5 subdistricts, 4 towns, 2 townships and 2 ethnic townships.

5 subdistricts

- Wenlan Subdistrict (文澜街道)
- Yuguopu Subdistrict (雨过铺街道)
- Guanlan Subdistrict (观澜街道)
- Wencui Subdistrict (文萃街道)
- Xin'ansuo Subdistrict (新安所街道)

4 towns

- Caoba (草坝镇)
- Zhicun (芷村镇)
- Mingjiu (鸣鹫镇)
- Lengquan (冷泉镇)

2 townships

- Shuitian Township (水田乡)
- Xibeilei Township (西北勒乡)

2 ethnic townships

- Qilu Bai and Miao Ethnic Township (期路白苗族乡)
- Laozhai Miao Ethnic Township (老寨苗族乡)

== Geography and climate ==
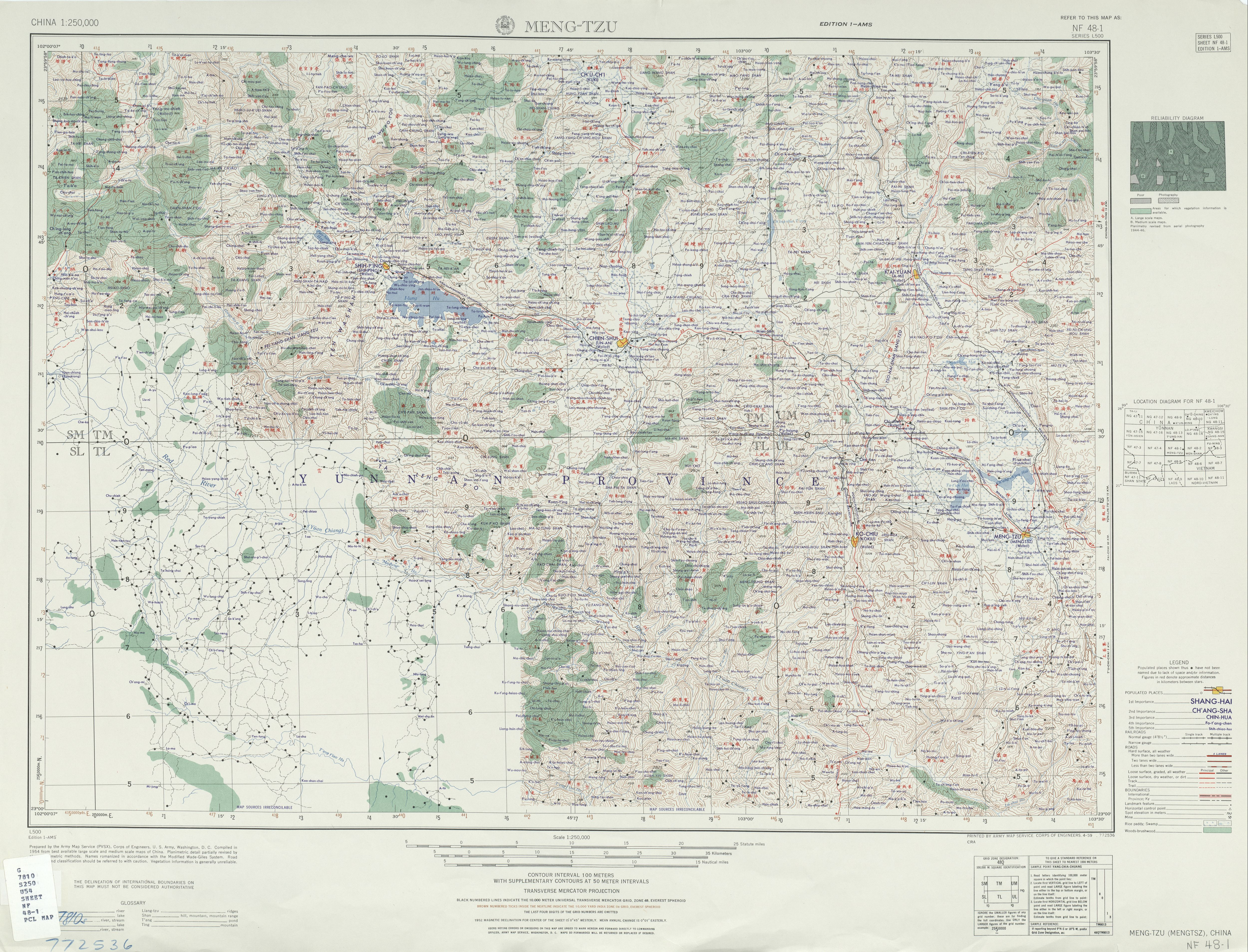
Mengzi (labelled as MENG-TZU (MENGTSZ) 蒙自) (1954)

Located within 30 arc minutes south of the Tropic of Cancer, Mengzi, as with much of southern Yunnan, has a warm humid subtropical climate (Köppen Cwa), with muddled distinction between the seasons and daytime temperatures remaining warm year-round. Highs peak in May before the core of the rainy season and reach a minimum in December; however, the warmest and coolest months are June and December, respectively at 23.2 °C (73.8 °F) and 12.3 °C (54.1 °F); the annual mean is 18.65 °C (65.6 °F). June thru September accounts for over 60% of the annual rainfall of 857 mm (33.7 in) and during this time, some rainfall occurs on a majority of days, resulting in a marked reduction in sunshine. With monthly percent possible sunshine ranging from 34% in June and July to 64% in February, the city receives 2,161 hours of bright sunshine annually.

Climate data for Mengzi, elevation 1,314 m (4,311 ft), (1991–2020 normals, extremes 1907–1932, 1951–present)
| Month | Jan | Feb | Mar | Apr | May | Jun | Jul | Aug | Sep | Oct | Nov | Dec | Year |
|---|---|---|---|---|---|---|---|---|---|---|---|---|---|
| Record high °C (°F) | 30.1 (86.2) | 31.3 (88.3) | 33.9 (93.0) | 36.0 (96.8) | 36.7 (98.1) | 35.6 (96.1) | 35.0 (95.0) | 36.4 (97.5) | 34.0 (93.2) | 32.3 (90.1) | 31.5 (88.7) | 27.8 (82.0) | 36.7 (98.1) |
| Mean daily maximum °C (°F) | 18.8 (65.8) | 21.3 (70.3) | 25.1 (77.2) | 27.6 (81.7) | 28.4 (83.1) | 28.5 (83.3) | 27.8 (82.0) | 27.9 (82.2) | 27.0 (80.6) | 24.4 (75.9) | 22.0 (71.6) | 18.8 (65.8) | 24.8 (76.6) |
| Daily mean °C (°F) | 12.9 (55.2) | 15.1 (59.2) | 18.6 (65.5) | 21.4 (70.5) | 23.0 (73.4) | 23.8 (74.8) | 23.3 (73.9) | 22.9 (73.2) | 21.9 (71.4) | 19.5 (67.1) | 16.3 (61.3) | 13.1 (55.6) | 19.3 (66.8) |
| Mean daily minimum °C (°F) | 8.8 (47.8) | 10.8 (51.4) | 14.1 (57.4) | 17.0 (62.6) | 19.2 (66.6) | 20.7 (69.3) | 20.4 (68.7) | 19.9 (67.8) | 18.6 (65.5) | 16.4 (61.5) | 12.5 (54.5) | 9.3 (48.7) | 15.6 (60.2) |
| Record low °C (°F) | −3.9 (25.0) | −0.4 (31.3) | −1.8 (28.8) | 4.0 (39.2) | 9.6 (49.3) | 12.2 (54.0) | 13.5 (56.3) | 12.4 (54.3) | 8.6 (47.5) | 1.8 (35.2) | −0.1 (31.8) | −4.4 (24.1) | −4.4 (24.1) |
| Average precipitation mm (inches) | 24.9 (0.98) | 15.6 (0.61) | 23.3 (0.92) | 50.2 (1.98) | 93.6 (3.69) | 110.5 (4.35) | 161.6 (6.36) | 141.5 (5.57) | 84.4 (3.32) | 56.5 (2.22) | 35.7 (1.41) | 19.1 (0.75) | 816.9 (32.16) |
| Average precipitation days (≥ 0.1 mm) | 5.0 | 4.4 | 5.7 | 8.9 | 12.8 | 15.5 | 19.6 | 19.0 | 13.3 | 9.3 | 5.3 | 3.8 | 122.6 |
| Average snowy days | 0.2 | 0 | 0 | 0 | 0 | 0 | 0 | 0 | 0 | 0 | 0 | 0 | 0.2 |
| Average relative humidity (%) | 70 | 64 | 60 | 61 | 65 | 72 | 76 | 77 | 74 | 74 | 72 | 72 | 70 |
| Mean monthly sunshine hours | 198.1 | 205.4 | 224.2 | 223.5 | 206.3 | 139.1 | 129.9 | 144.5 | 150.6 | 145.8 | 188.5 | 185.2 | 2,141.1 |
| Percentage possible sunshine | 59 | 64 | 60 | 59 | 50 | 34 | 31 | 36 | 41 | 41 | 57 | 56 | 49 |
Source 1: China Meteorological Administration all-time extreme temperature
Source 2: Weather China, The Yearbook of Indochina (extremes 1907-1932)

== Food ==
The Mengzi region is well known for a dish called guoqiao mixian ("Over the Bridge Rice Noodle"), made with long rice-flour noodles.

== History ==
=== Pre-13th Century: Ancient Foundations ===
The history of Mengzi can be traced back to Western Han dynasty when Bengu County (贲古县) was founded (109 B.C.), which was currently the area of Xin'ansuo, Mengzi.

=== 13th to 19th Century: Emergence of Mengzi ===
Not until in 1276 (Yuan dynasty), Mengzi county was formerly founded, which can be regarded as the prototype of the modern Mengzi City.

=== Late Qing to Early Republic of China: Mengzi as a Treaty Port ===
In 1886, following the war between France and the Qing China, a series of treaties designated Mengzi as a trade port in Yunnan province for the import and export of goods via Tonkin, currently the Northern Vietnam. Under the terms of these treaties, foreigners were allowed to reside and trade in Mengzi. Accordingly, the foreign-operated Imperial Maritime Customs Service established its office just outside the eastern city gate of Mengzi in 1899.

Communications were inconvenient: goods from Hanoi or Haiphong were shipped to Hekou on the Vietnamese border by junk, transferred by small craft to Manhao, and then taken 60 km (37 mi) by pack animal to Mengzi. Despite these difficulties, Mengzi was an important port of entry into both Yunnan and western Guizhou provinces, and in 1889 it was opened to foreign trade as a treaty port. Throughout the late 19th and early 20th century, Mengzi was a major trading center for commerce between the interior of Yunnan and the Tonkin. Most of this foreign trade was in tin and opium. Its main exports were tin and opium, and the main imports were mostly textiles (primarily cotton) and tobacco.

=== 1910s to 1930s: Transformation and Decline ===
As a trading center, the city gradually began to lose its importance beginning from the early 20th century. The importance of Mengzi was ended by the construction of the French railway from Haiphong to Kunming (the Yunnan provincial capital) in 1906–10. This railway bypassed Mengzi, but in 1915 a branch line was built via the town to the Gejiu tin mines. Apart from a brief respite during the early days of World War II, the town of Mengzi has, nevertheless, steadily declined in importance ever since.

Gejiu became a county in 1913, and a city in 1951. With the improvement of communications and transportation between cities of Gejiu and Kaiyuan and the other counties nearby, plus the development of trade between southwestern China and the countries of Southeast Asia, Mengzi's ties have increasingly strengthened with Gejiu and Kaiyuan. The whole area has become a border economic centre. In addition to tin, the county's natural resources include coal, manganese, lead, zinc, and antimony.

=== Mengzi during the Second Sino-Japanese War: Resilience During Turmoil ===
When the Japanese invaded Beijing and Tianjin in the late 1930s, university professors, students, and administrators there were forced to leave and travel south to Changsha. Later as the Japanese pushed into Changsha, the academics made their own long march westward to Yunnan Province. There they established the Southwest Associated Universities, also known as Lianda (Chinese: 联大). The School of Arts and Law was located in Mengzi, but moved to the provincial capital of Kunming about half a year later.

=== Modern Mengzi ===
In 2003, the prefectural government of Honghe moved from nearby Gejiu to Mengzi. New wealthy suburbs and large government offices have sprung up as a result, but much of the poverty remains, creating a large wealth gap within the city.

In 2012, 11-14 thousand year old early human bones from Maludong near Mengzi City (some of them already in museum collections) were reported. These are provisionally known as the Red Deer Cave people.

== Twin towns — Sister cities ==
Mengzi is twinned with:

- Modesto, California, United States
- Lao Cai, Lào Cai, Vietnam
- Châteauroux, Indre, France

== Economy ==
Mengzi used to be a medium-sized county town before the prefectural government relocated there from the City of Gejiu in 2003. Since then, the city has witnessed a rapid urban and economic expansion with significant infrastructure projects. In 2010, Mengzi was elevated to a city administratively.

Real estate industry is pivotal sector of the city's economy. Recent policy developments have promoted economic growth, leading to substantial changes in the local industry structure and employment landscape.

== Transport ==
=== Railway ===
- The narrow-gauge Kunming–Hai Phong railway, in the mountains east of the city (passenger service discontinued), and its branches
- Yuxi–Mengzi railway (opened in 2013)
- Mengzi–Hekou railway (opened in December 2014); regular passenger service between Kunming and Hekou
- Mile–Mengzi high-speed railway (Honghe railway station) has opened in 2022

=== Tram ===
Honghe tram runs from Mengzi North railway station to the city center.

=== Airport ===
Honghe Mengzi Airport in Mengzi is under construction.

== Tourism ==
Mengzi is an ancient city in Yunnan, with a long history dating back thousands of years. It is home to numerous historic sites, though many of its splendid structures were damaged or destroyed primarily during the Taiping Rebellion and the Cultural Revolution in 1960s. The following lists some of the prominent sites in the city.

- South Lake (Chinese: 南湖): A naturally formed lake that was later expanded artificially, dating back to the late Ming dynasty.
- Yingzhou Pavilion (Chinese: 瀛洲亭): A Chinese pavilion with a hexagonal structure located within South Lake Park, built in 1690.
- The Customs Relic: An area featuring clusters of European-style buildings, which primarily served as the French concession during the late 19th century.
- Bisezhai train station (Chinese: 碧色寨站): A train station constructed by the French in the early 20th century. It was one of the most pivotal stations on the Kunming–Haiphong railway line, an important communication route between Yunnan and Vietnam.
- Xin'ansuo Ancient Building Complex (Chinese: 新安所古建筑群): A complex of ancient Chinese buildings in Xin'ansuo town of Mengzi, dating back to the 16th century. It is renowned for its unique and diverse architectural styles and ethnic customs, which reflect the town's distinctive geographical environment and historically significant military status.
