= Honghe Hani and Yi Autonomous Prefecture =

Coordinates: 23.36°N 103.37°E

Honghe Prefecture 红河州
- Autonomous prefecture
- Honghe Hani and Yi Autonomous Prefecture 红河哈尼族彝族自治州 (Chinese); Haoqhoq Haqniqssaq Haqhholssaq Ziiqziifzel (Hani) ꉼꉻꆈꌠꊨꏦꏱꅉꍏ (Yi)
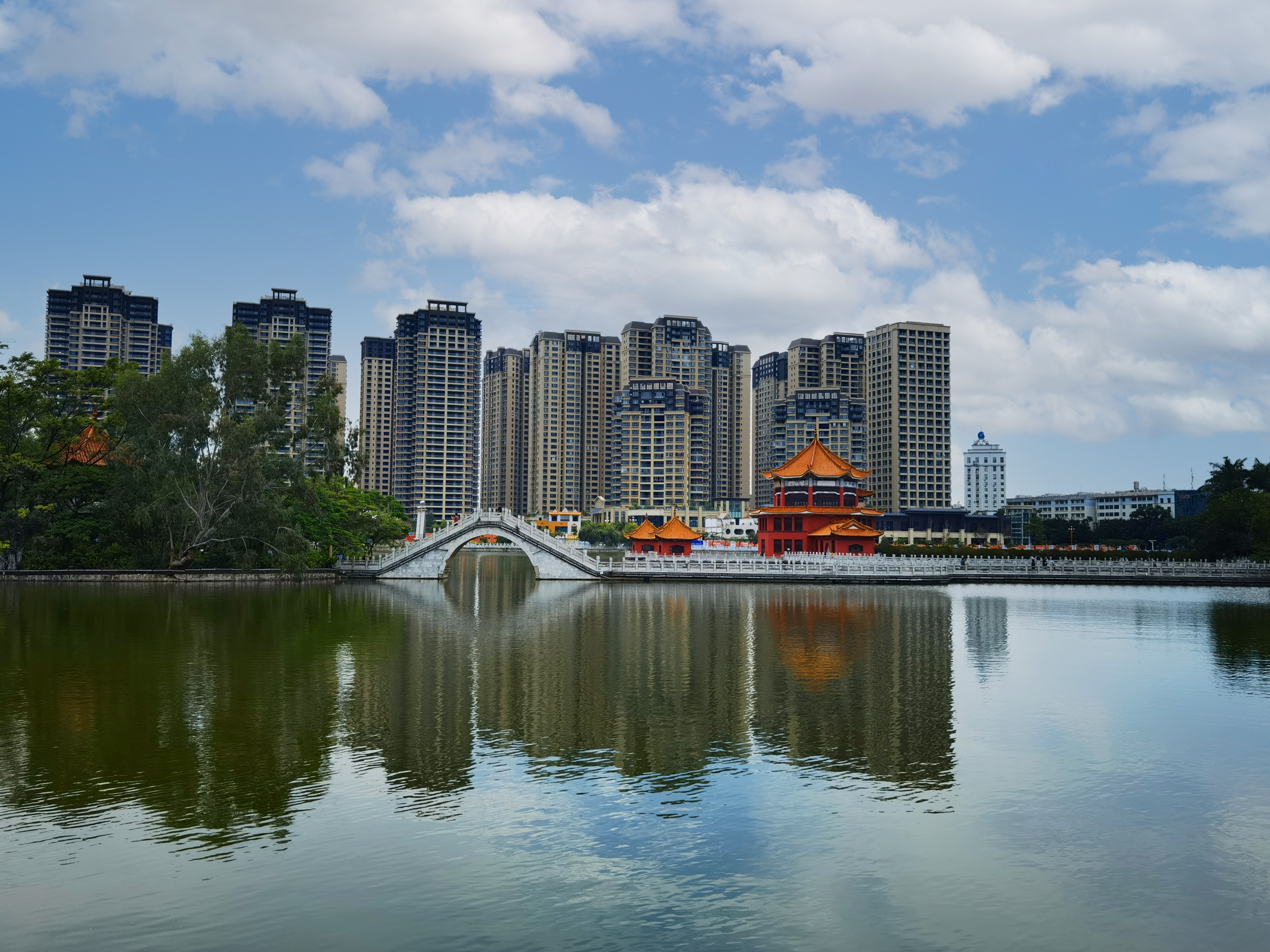
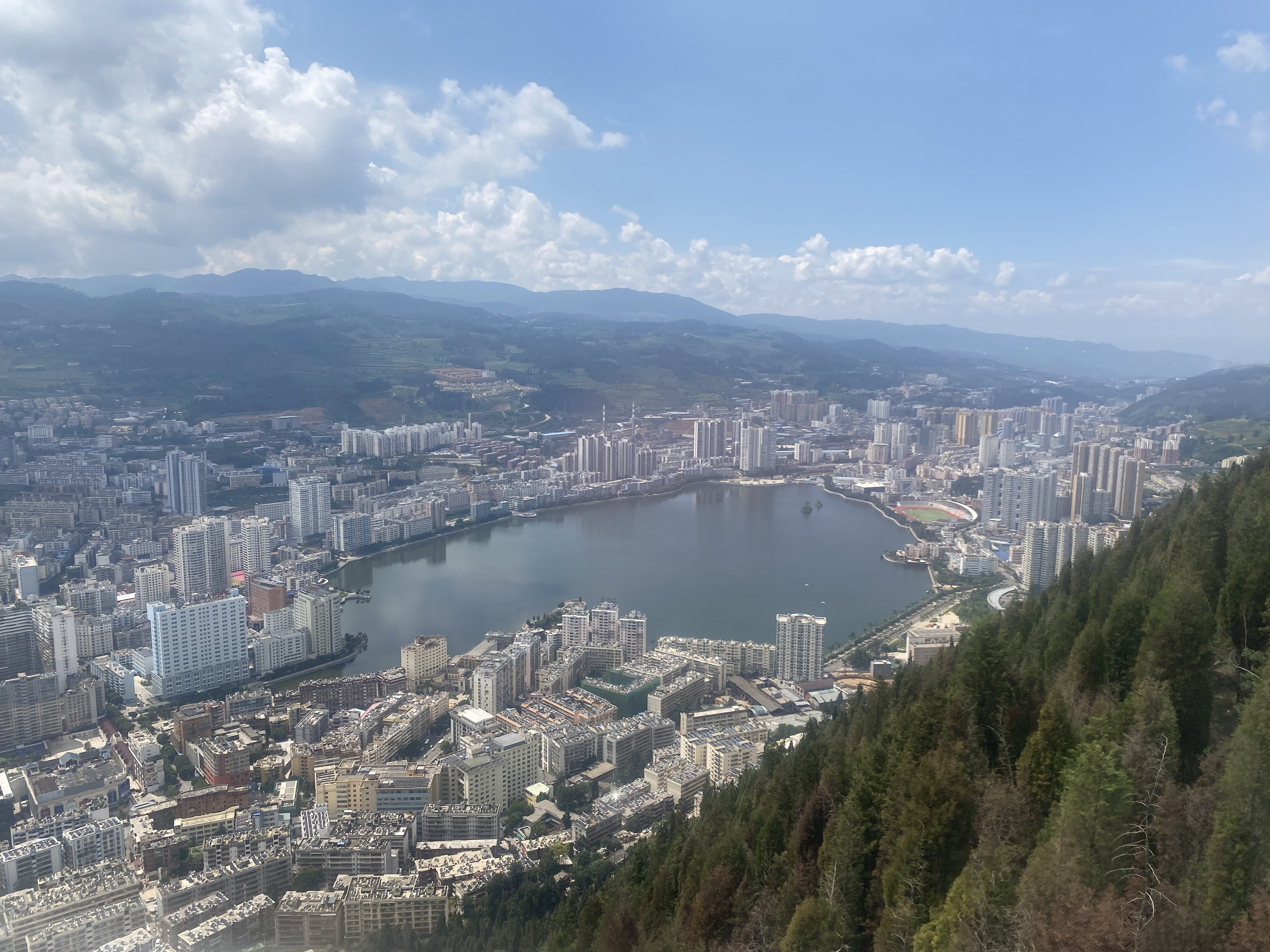
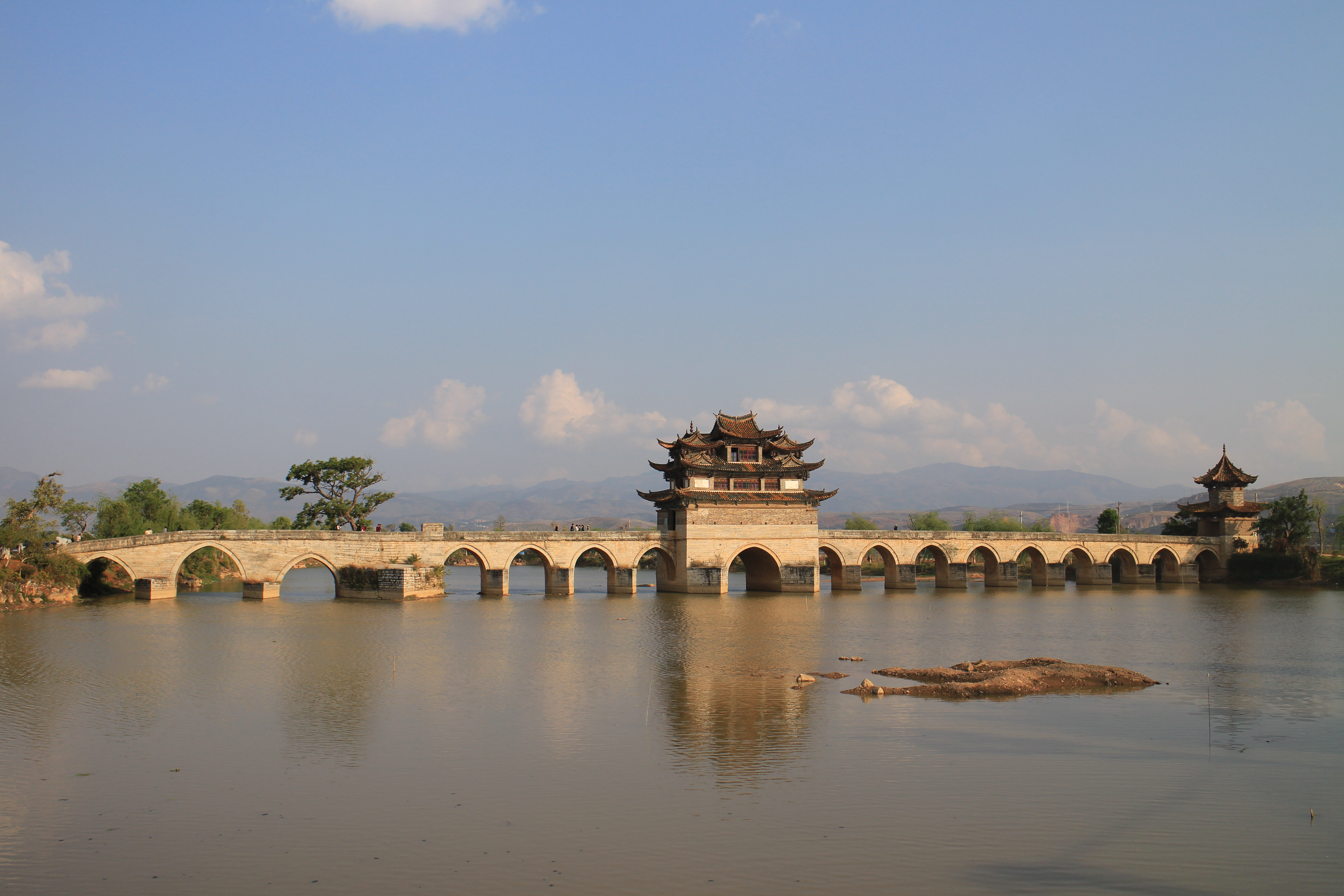
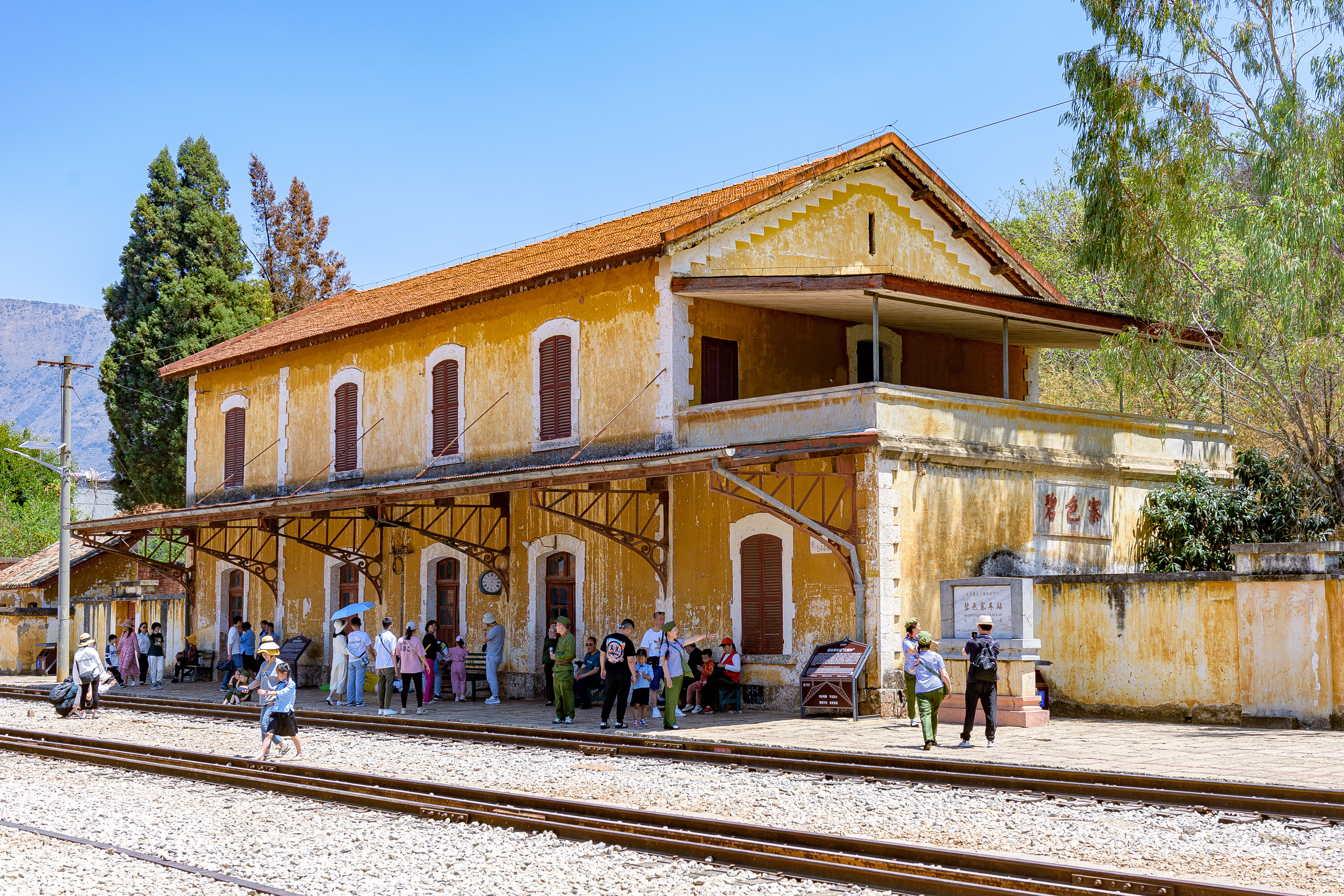
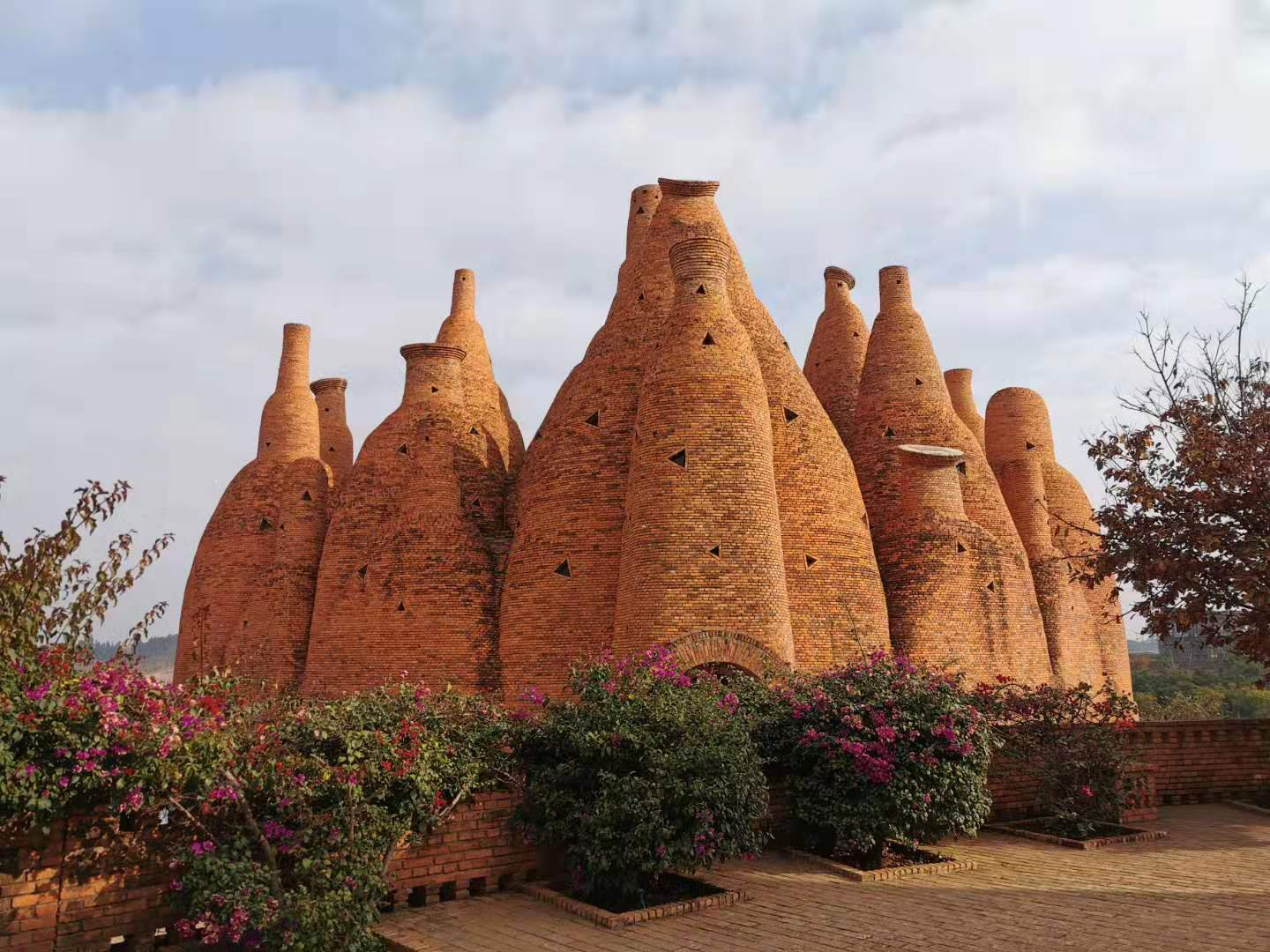
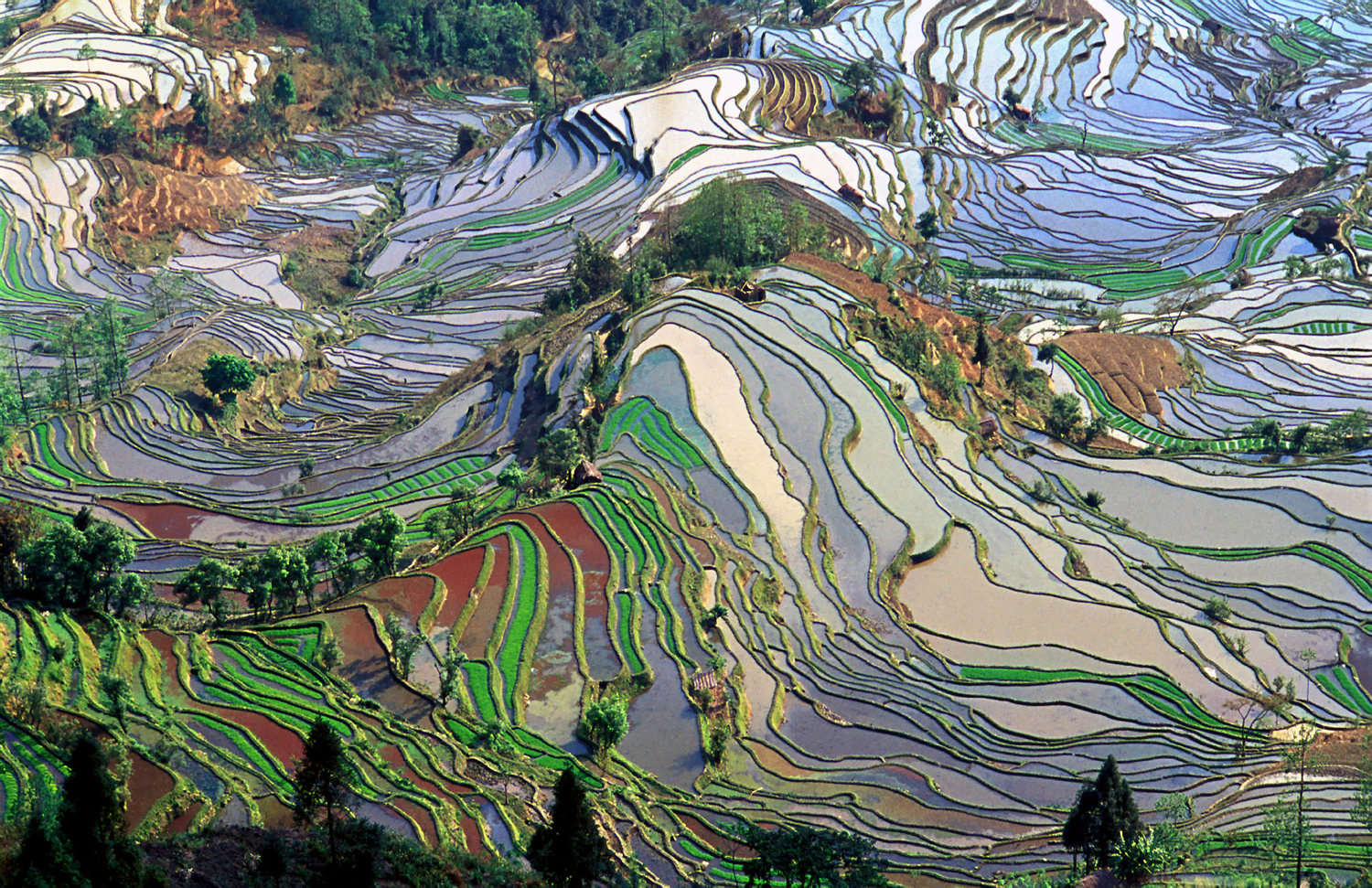
- Mengzi South Lake Downtown of Gejiu Jianshui Double Dragon Bridge Bisezhai Railway Station Mile Dongfengyun art town Hani Rice Terraces

- Location of Honghe Prefecture in Yunnan
- Country: People's Republic of China
- Province: Yunnan
- County-level division: 3 county-level cities 7 counties 3 autonomous counties
- Prefecture established: 6 September 1957
- Prefecture seat: Mengzi

Area
  - Autonomous prefecture: 32,929 km^{2} (12,714 sq mi)
- Highest elevation (Xilongshan, Jinping County): 3,074.3 m (10,086 ft)
- Lowest elevation (Confluence of the Hong River and Nanxi River in Hekou): 76.4 m (251 ft)

Population (31 December 2019)
  - Autonomous prefecture: 4,775,000
  - Density: 145.0/km^{2} (375.6/sq mi)
  - Urban: 33.7%

GDP
  - Autonomous prefecture: CN¥ 286.3 billion US$ 42.2 billion
  - Per capita: CN¥ 64,768; US$ 9,553
- Time zone: UTC+8 (China Standard)
- Postal code: 661400
- Area code: 0873
- ISO 3166 code: CN-YN-25
- Licence plate prefixes: 云G
- Website: HH.gov.cn

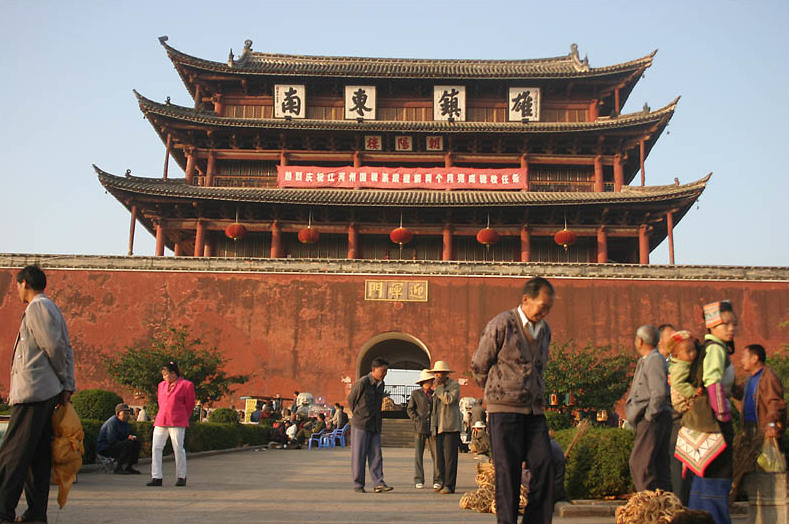
The old city gate of Jianshui County

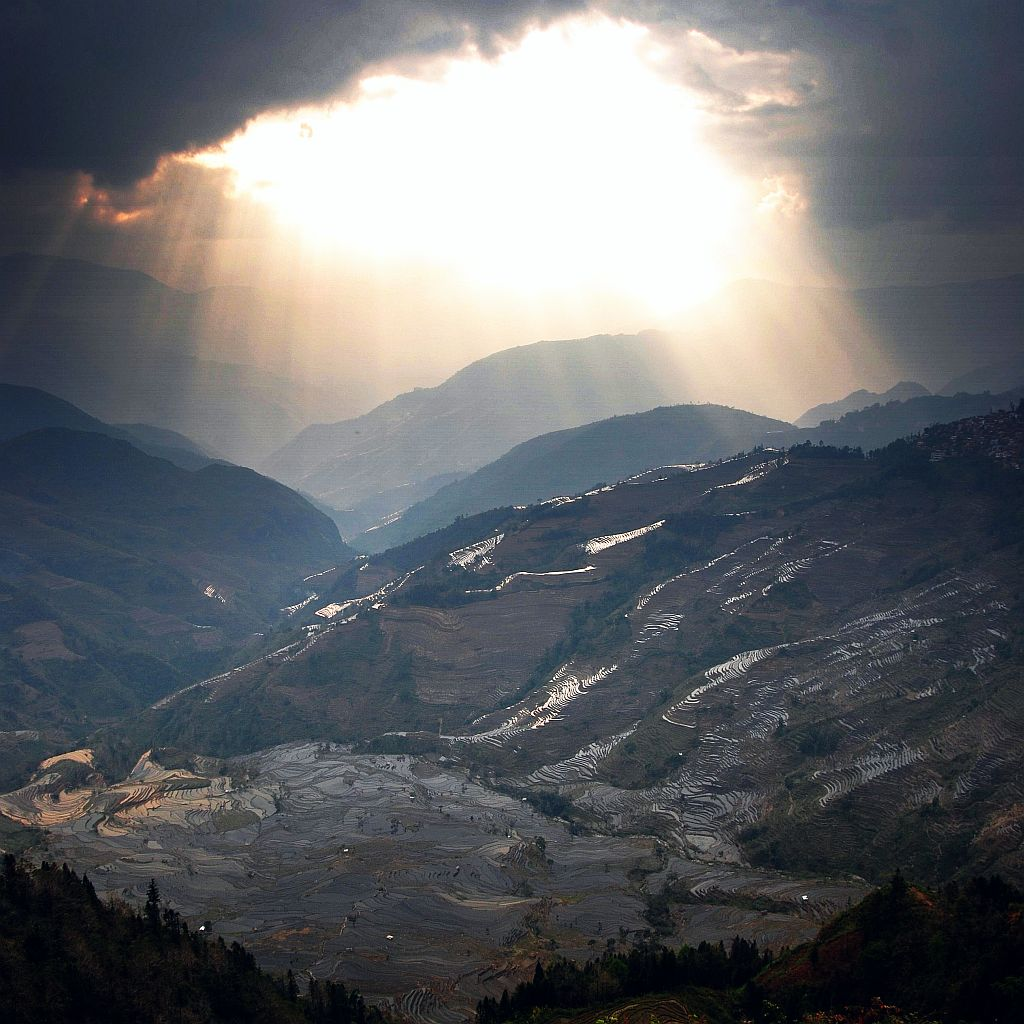
Rice terraced mountains of Yuanyang County near sunset

Honghe
- Traditional Chinese: 紅河
- Simplified Chinese: 红河
- Postal: Hungho
Transcriptions
Standard Mandarin
- Hanyu Pinyin: Hónghé
- Wade–Giles: Hung^{2}-ho^{2}

Honghe Hani and Yi Autonomous Prefecture
- Traditional Chinese: 紅河哈尼族彝族自治州
- Simplified Chinese: 红河哈尼族彝族自治州
- Postal: Hungho Hani and I Autonomous Prefecture
Transcriptions
Standard Mandarin
- Hanyu Pinyin: Hónghé Hānízú Yízú Zìzhìzhōu
- Wade–Giles: Hung^{2}-ho^{2} Ha^{1}-ni^{2}-tsu^{2} I^{2}-tsu^{2} Tzu^{4}-chih^{4}-chou^{1}

Honghe Hani and Yi Autonomous Prefecture (simplified Chinese: 红河哈尼族彝族自治州; traditional Chinese: 紅河哈尼族彝族自治州; pinyin: Hónghé Hānízú Yízú Zìzhìzhōu; Hani: Haoqhoq Haqniqssaq Haqhholssaq Ziiqziifzel; Yi: ꉼꉸꉳꆃꁈꆃꁈꊨꏦꍓ) is an autonomous prefecture in Southeast-Central Yunnan Province, China, bordering Vietnam's Lào Cai and Lai Châu provinces to the south. Its name is derived from the Hong (Red) River and the two major ethnic minority groups who live there: the Yi and the Hani. Honghe has an area of 32,929 square kilometres (12,714 sq mi) and its seat is Mengzi. The total population is 4.8 million, of which 61.3% belong to ethnic minorities.

In 2008, the State Administration of Cultural Heritage of the People's Republic of China nominated the Honghe Hani Terraced Fields of Yuanyang County for World Heritage Site status. It was added to the list on 22 June 2013, bringing the total number of World Heritage Sites in China to 45. At the end of 2024, the resident population of the state was 4.339 million.

== Subdivisions ==
The prefecture is subdivided into 13 county-level divisions: 4 county-level cities, 6 counties, and 3 autonomous counties:

Map
Name	Hanzi	Hanyu Pinyin	Population (2010)	Area (km^{2})	Density (/km^{2})
Mengzi City	蒙自市	Méngzì Shì	417,200	2,228	187
Gejiu City	个旧市	Gèjiù Shì	459,800	1,597	288
Kaiyuan City	开远市	Kāiyuǎn Shì	322,700	2,009	161
Mile City	弥勒市	Mílè Shì	539,700	4,004	135
Lüchun County	绿春县	Lǜchūn Xiàn	222,200	3,167	70
Jianshui County	建水县	Jiànshuǐ Xiàn	531,500	3,940	135
Shiping County	石屏县	Shípíng Xiàn	299,100	3,090	97
Luxi County	泸西县	Lúxī Xiàn	400,700	1,674	239
Yuanyang County	元阳县	Yuányáng Xiàn	396,800	2,292	173
Honghe County	红河县	Hónghé Xiàn	296,500	2,034	146
Jinping Miao, Yao and Dai Autonomous County	金平苗族瑶族傣族自治县	Jīnpíng Miáozú Yáozú Dǎizú Zìzhìxiàn	356,200	3,677	97
Hekou Yao Autonomous County	河口瑶族自治县	Hékǒu Yáozú Zìzhìxiàn	104,600	1,313	80
Pingbian Miao Autonomous County	屏边苗族自治县	Píngbiān Miáozú Zìzhìxiàn	154,000	1,905	81

== Demographics ==
At the end of 2019, Honghe Prefecture had 4.775 million residents, of which 61.3% belonged to ethnic minorities.

=== Ethnic groups in Honghe, 2010 census ===
Nationality	Population	Percentage
Han	1,928,601	42.85%
Yi	1,043,599	23.19%
Hani	789,702	17.55%
Hmong	326,141	7.25%
Zhuang	111,182	2.47%
Dai	106,150	2.36%
Yao	92,759	2.06%
Hui	74,767	1.66%
Lahu	11,430	0.25%
Bai	4,846	0.11%
Others	11,719	0.26%
Total	4,500,896	

=== Ethnic subgroups ===
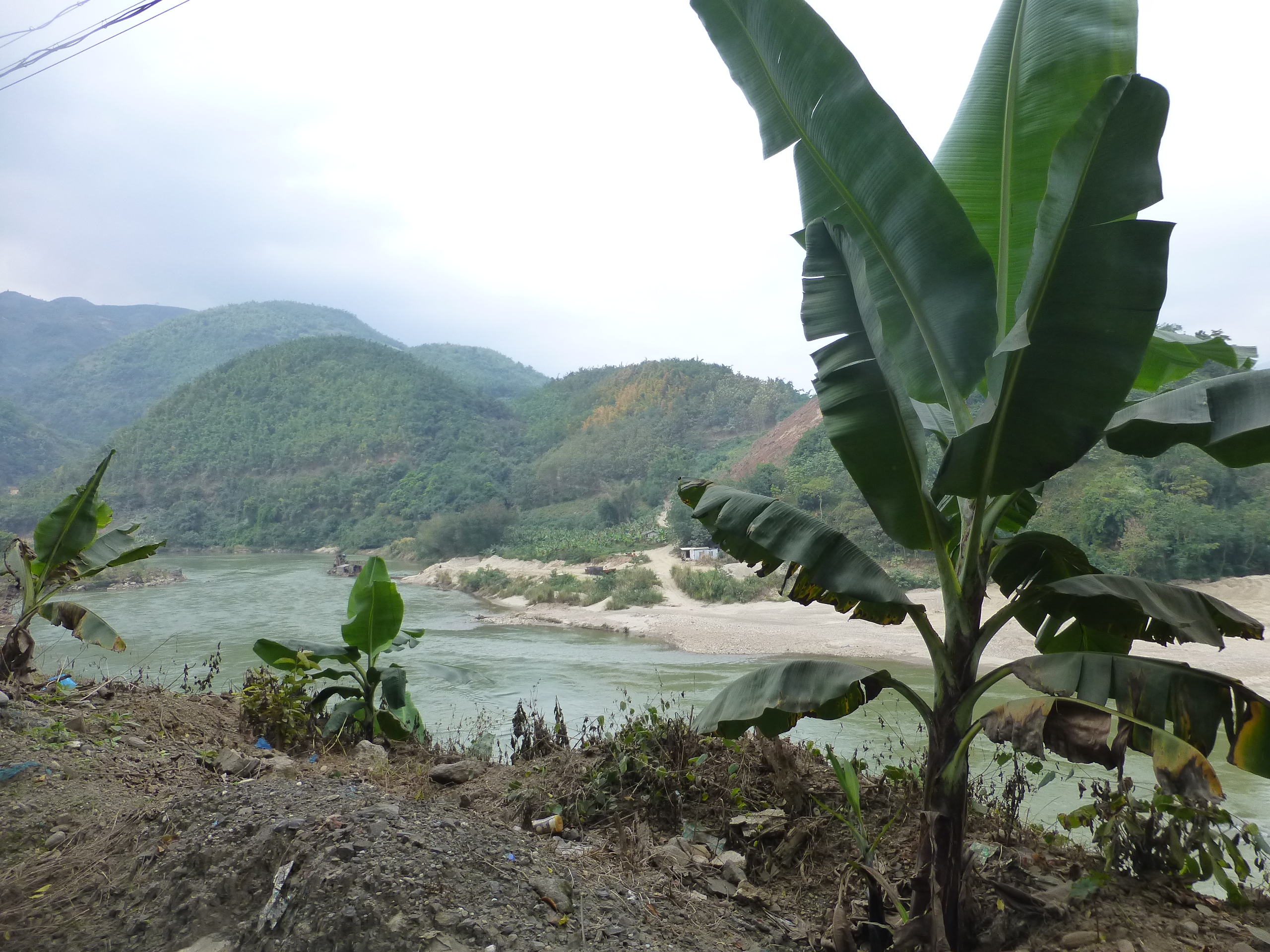
The Red River forms the border between Honghe Prefecture's Jinping County (background) and Hekou County (foreground). Bananas are grown in abundance on both sides of the river

Honghe Prefecture has the following ethnic Hani subgroups (Honghe Ethnic Gazetteer 1989:32):

- Hani
- Nuobi
- Nuomei
- Ache
- Lami
- Baihong
- Asuo
- Budu
- Qide
- Gehe
- Biyue
- Kaduo
- Ha'ou (哈欧)
- Enu (Ximoluo)

Honghe Prefecture has the following 10 ethnic Yi subgroups (Honghe Ethnic Gazetteer 1989:68):

- Nisubo 尼苏泼 (exonyms and other names: Luoluo 罗罗, Sandaohong 三道红, Huayao 花腰, Muji 母基)
- Nibo 尼泼 (exonyms and other names: Sani 撒尼, Azhe 阿哲)
- Gepo 葛泼 (exonyms and other names: White Yi 白彝)
- Siqi 斯期 (exonyms and other names: Large Black Yi 大黑彝, Small Black Yi 小黑彝)
- Axibo 阿细泼 (exonyms and other names: Axi 阿细)
- Puwabo 朴瓦泼, Pulebo 普勒泼 (exonyms and other names: Pula 朴喇)
- Alubo 阿鲁泼 (exonyms and other names: Alu 阿鲁)
- Lesubo 勒苏泼 (exonyms and other names: Shansu 山苏)
- Luobo 罗泼 (exonyms and other names: Awu 阿务, Laowu 老乌)
- Xiangtang 香堂

== Transportation ==
=== Roads ===
- G80 Guangzhou–Kunming Expressway
- G8011 Kaiyuan–Hekou Expressway
- G5615 Tianbao–Houqiao Expressway
- S45 Yuanjiang–Manhao Expressway
- China National Highway 219
- China National Highway 323
- China National Highway 326
- China National Highway 553

=== Railways ===
The prefecture is crossed by the early-20th century narrow-gauge Kunming–Hai Phong Railway and its branches. These railways have lost most of their economic importance after the opening of the standard-gauge Kunming-Hekou railway (whose sections within the prefecture are the Yuxi–Mengzi Railway and the Mengzi–Hekou Railway).

The prefecture is also served by the Nanning–Kunming high-speed railway and Mile–Mengzi Railway (under construction).

=== Airport ===
Honghe Mengzi Airport is being built in the prefectural capital Mengzi.
