= Nanxi =

Nanxi or Nan-hsi may refer to:

- Nanxi (theatre) (南戲), an early form of Chinese opera

== Places ==
- Nanxi District, Yibin (南溪区), a district of Yibin, Sichuan, China
  - Nanxi Subdistrict, in Nanxi District, Yibin
- Nanxi Township (南溪乡), a township in Taihe County, Jiangxi, China

=== Towns in China ===
- Nanxi, Anhui (南溪), in Jinzhai County, Anhui
- Nanxi, Chongqing (南溪), in Yunyang County, Chongqing
- Nanxi, Guangdong (南溪), in Puning, Guangdong
- Nanxi, Henan (南席), in Changge, Henan
- Nanxi, Yunnan (南溪), in Hekou Yao Autonomous County, Yunnan

== Rivers of China ==
- Nanxi River (Yunnan) (南溪河), tributary of the Red River in Yunnan
- Nanxi River (Zhejiang) (楠溪江), major tributary of the Ou River in Zhejiang

== See also ==
- Nansi District, Tainan (楠西區), sometimes spelled Nanxi, a district of Tainan, Taiwan
- Nan Qi (artist) (南溪) (born 1960), also known as Nan Xi, Chinese artist
