= Lào Cai (city) =

Former provincial city in Vietnam

- Former provincial city
- Lào Cai City; Thành phố Lào Cai
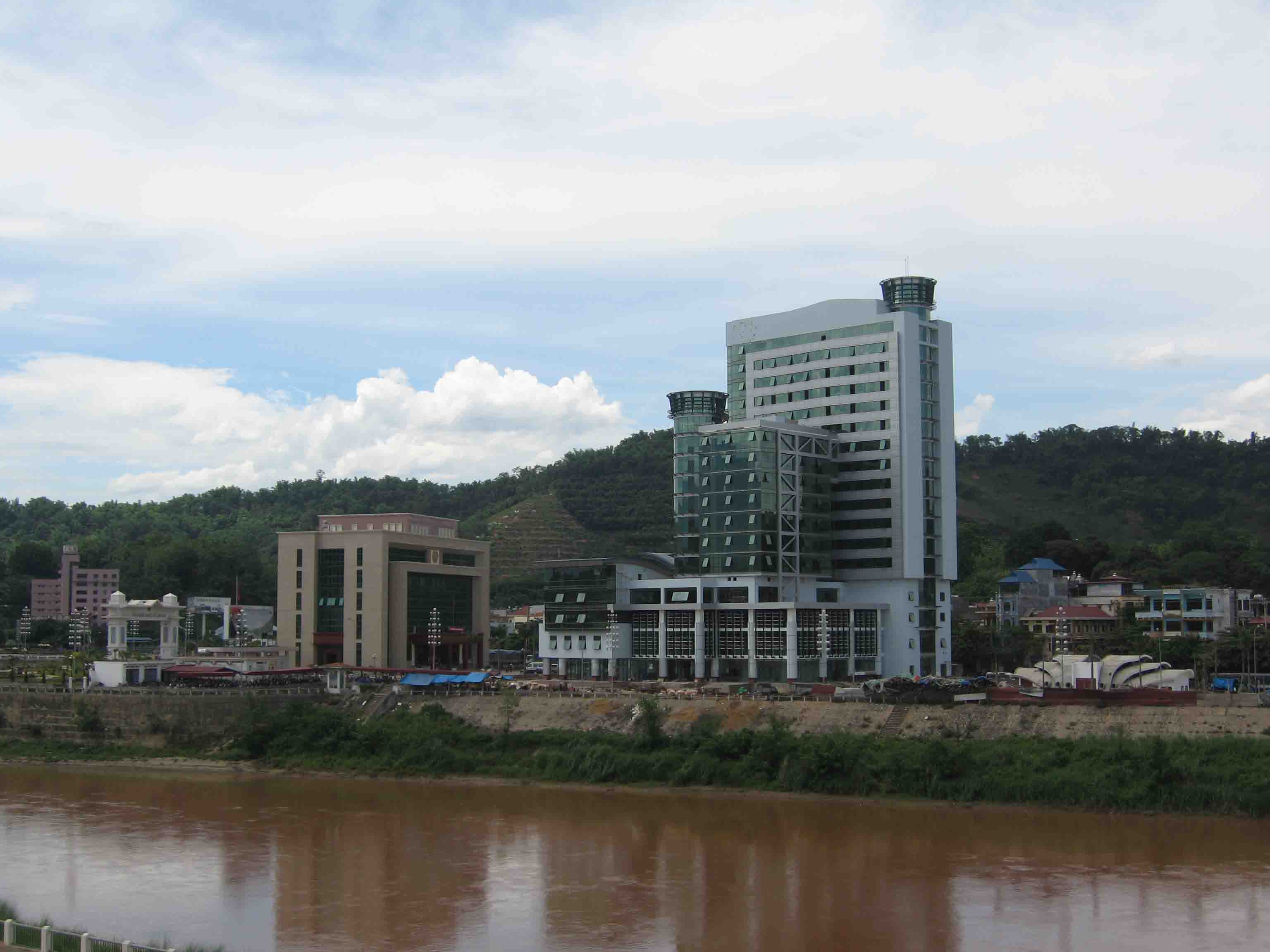

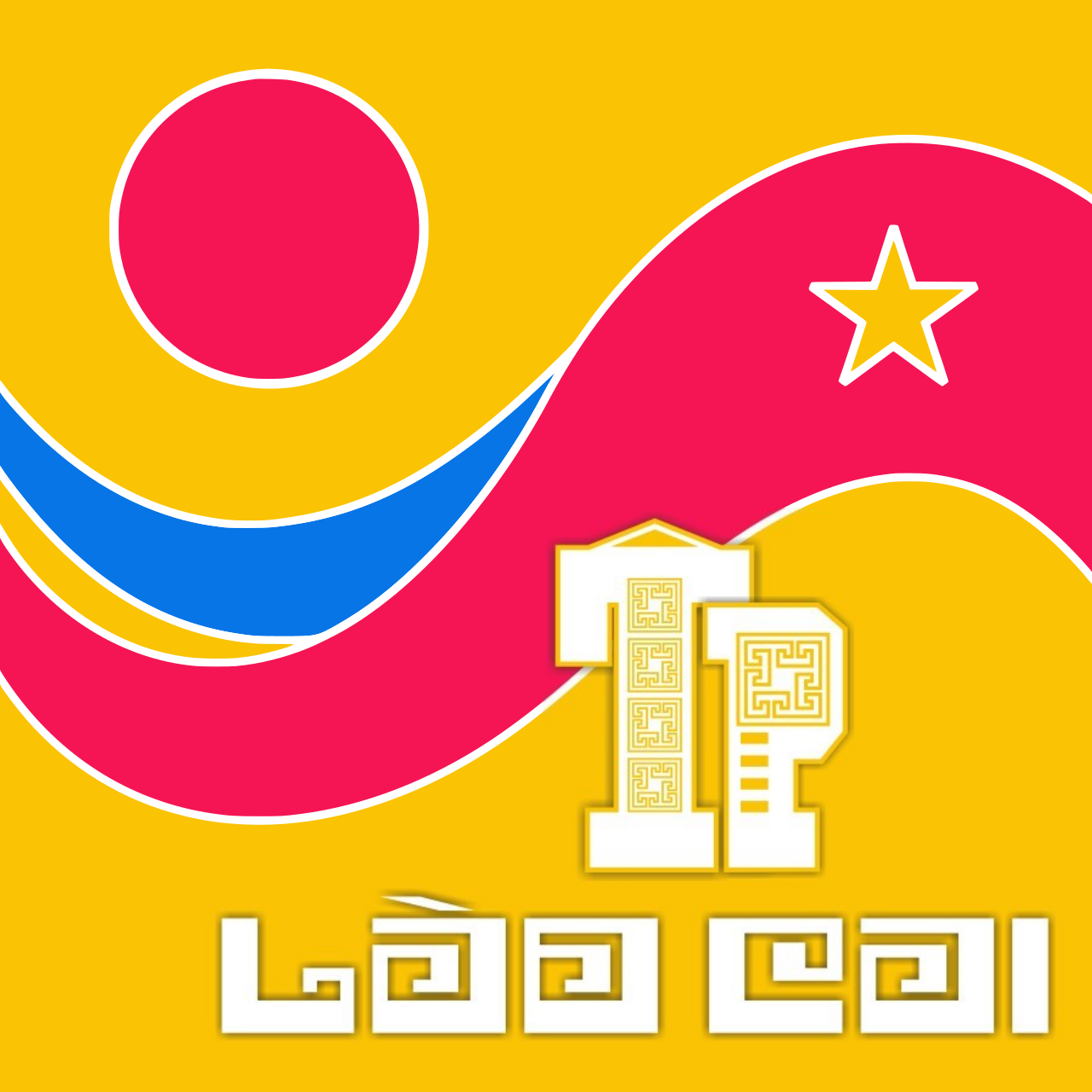
- Seal
- Interactive map of Lào Cai
- Location in Vietnam
- Coordinates: 22°28′50″N 103°58′30″E
- Country: Vietnam
- Province: Lào Cai
- Establishment: 30 November 2004
- Disestablishment: 1 July 2025

Area
  - Total: 282.13 km^{2} (108.93 sq mi)

Population (2020)
  - Total: 130,671
- Climate: Cwa

Lào Cai (Vietnamese pronunciation: [làːw kāːj]) is a former provincial city that has been dissolved and reorganized into wards and communes within Lào Cai province, Vietnam. It was formerly the capital of the province. It is located approximately 260 km (160 mi) northwest of Hanoi, at the meeting point of the Red River (Sông Hồng) and the Nanxi River. It borders Bảo Thắng, Bát Xát, and Sa Pa, as well as Hekou Yao Autonomous County in Yunnan, China.

The area is an important regional trade and transport center. Lào Cai railway station lies on the Kunming–Haiphong railway, which connects northern Vietnam with Yunnan in China.

== History ==
Lào Cai saw fighting during the Battle of Lao Cai in the Sino-Vietnamese War of 1979, after which the border stayed closed until 1993.

On 20 February 2025, Vietnam’s parliament approved an $8 billion investment to upgrade the railway built during the French colonial period under the Belt and Road Initiative. The railway connects Hekou Yao Autonomous County, Lào Cai, Hanoi, and Haiphong.

On 1 July 2025, Lào Cai city was dissolved following a national administrative reorganization. Lào Cai province was merged with Yên Bái province to form a new Lào Cai province, and the provincial city level was removed. The former city area was divided into two wards (Cam Đường and Lào Cai) and two communes (Cốc San and Hợp Thành). Provincial administrative functions moved to Yên Bái.

== Climate ==
Lào Cai has a dry-winter humid subtropical climate (Köppen Cwa), similar to most of Northern Vietnam.

Climate data for Lào Cai
Month	Jan	Feb	Mar	Apr	May	Jun	Jul	Aug	Sep	Oct	Nov	Dec	Year
Record high °C (°F)	31.4 (88.5)	34.6 (94.3)	38.0 (100.4)	41.7 (107.1)	42.8 (109.0)	41.0 (105.8)	40.4 (104.7)	40.0 (104.0)	39.7 (103.5)	37.2 (99.0)	34.8 (94.6)	32.8 (91.0)	42.8 (109.0)
Mean daily maximum °C (°F)	20.1 (68.2)	21.8 (71.2)	25.3 (77.5)	29.1 (84.4)	32.1 (89.8)	33.1 (91.6)	33.0 (91.4)	32.7 (90.9)	31.6 (88.9)	28.9 (84.0)	25.4 (77.7)	21.9 (71.4)	27.9 (82.2)
Daily mean °C (°F)	16.0 (60.8)	17.8 (64.0)	21.0 (69.8)	24.5 (76.1)	27.5 (81.5)	28.5 (83.3)	28.3 (82.9)	27.8 (82.0)	26.7 (80.1)	24.5 (76.1)	20.7 (69.3)	17.5 (63.5)	23.4 (74.1)
Mean daily minimum °C (°F)	14.0 (57.2)	15.3 (59.5)	18.5 (65.3)	21.5 (70.7)	23.9 (75.0)	25.2 (77.4)	25.4 (77.7)	24.8 (76.6)	23.8 (74.8)	21.8 (71.2)	18.0 (64.4)	14.8 (58.6)	20.6 (69.1)
Record low °C (°F)	1.4 (34.5)	5.6 (42.1)	6.8 (44.2)	10.0 (50.0)	14.8 (58.6)	18.7 (65.7)	20.0 (68.0)	17.3 (63.1)	15.8 (60.4)	8.8 (47.8)	5.8 (42.4)	2.8 (37.0)	1.4 (34.5)
Average rainfall mm (inches)	30.3 (1.19)	37.3 (1.47)	64.4 (2.54)	122.6 (4.83)	197.5 (7.78)	230.5 (9.07)	305.1 (12.01)	361.0 (14.21)	218.9 (8.62)	119.1 (4.69)	53.9 (2.12)	30.9 (1.22)	1,771.5 (69.75)
Average rainy days	7.8	8.8	11.5	15.8	16.8	18.7	20.9	21.1	15.8	14.8	10.2	7.7	169.8
Average relative humidity (%)	84.8	84.0	82.5	83.1	81.4	84.4	85.8	86.0	85.5	85.8	86.3	85.8	84.6
Mean monthly sunshine hours	81.1	70.4	104.6	139.9	178.9	145.3	155.9	162.5	158.9	128.7	109.3	101.9	1,537.4
Source 1: Vietnam Institute for Building Science and Technology
Source 2: The Yearbook of Indochina (1932-1933)

=== Topography and geology ===
The city has diverse topographical and geological features, including hill, mountainous, half mountainous, coastal plains and coastal sand dunes.

The hilly region is in the west, stretching from north to south (in parts of communes: Dong Son, Thuan Duc) with an average elevation of 12–15 m, with total area of 64.93 km^{2}, 41.7% of the city total area. Residents here live on agriculture, forestry, farming. The soil in this area is poor in nutrition, infertile and subject to continuous erosion due to its slope of 7–10%.

The half hilly region surrounds a plain with an average elevation of 10 m from north-east - north to north-west – south-west and south – south-east. This region covers communes and wards of Bắc Lý, Nam Lý, Nghĩa Ninh, Bắc Nghĩa, Đức Ninh, Đức Ninh Đông, Lộc Ninh and Phú Hải with total area of 62.87 km^{2}, or accounts for 40.2% of the city total area. Residents here lives on industrial, handcraft, trading and a small percentage lives on farming. This region is not very fertile, subject to alum. However, thanks to the heavy distribution of rivers and lakes, ponds and pools, it's better for agriculture than the hilly region. The plain with the average of 2.1 m, with little slope, accounting for 0.2% of the city area (5.76 km^{2}). Most of the city's commercial, administrative and main streets concentrate in this narrow regions. Coastal sand dune area is on the east of the city, with an area of 21.98 km^{2}, making up 14,3% of the total area.

== Demographics ==
As of 2020 the city had a population of 130,671, covering an area of 282.13 km^{2}.

Ethnic minorities in Lào Cai used to speak Southwestern Mandarin and Vietnamese to each other when their languages were not mutually intelligible.

== Administrative divisions ==
Lào Cai City was officially divided into 17 commune-level sub-divisions, which included 10 wards (Bắc Cường, Bắc Lệnh, Bình Minh, Cốc Lếu, Duyên Hải, Kim Tân, Lào Cai, Nam Cường, Pom Hán, and Xuân Tăng) and 7 rural communes (Cam Đường, Cốc San, Đồng Tuyển, Hợp Thành, Tả Phời, Thống Nhất, Vạn Hòa).
