= Lào Cai station =

Railway station in Lào Cai, Vietnam

Coordinates: 22°29′33″N 103°58′42″E

Lao Cai Ga Lào Cai
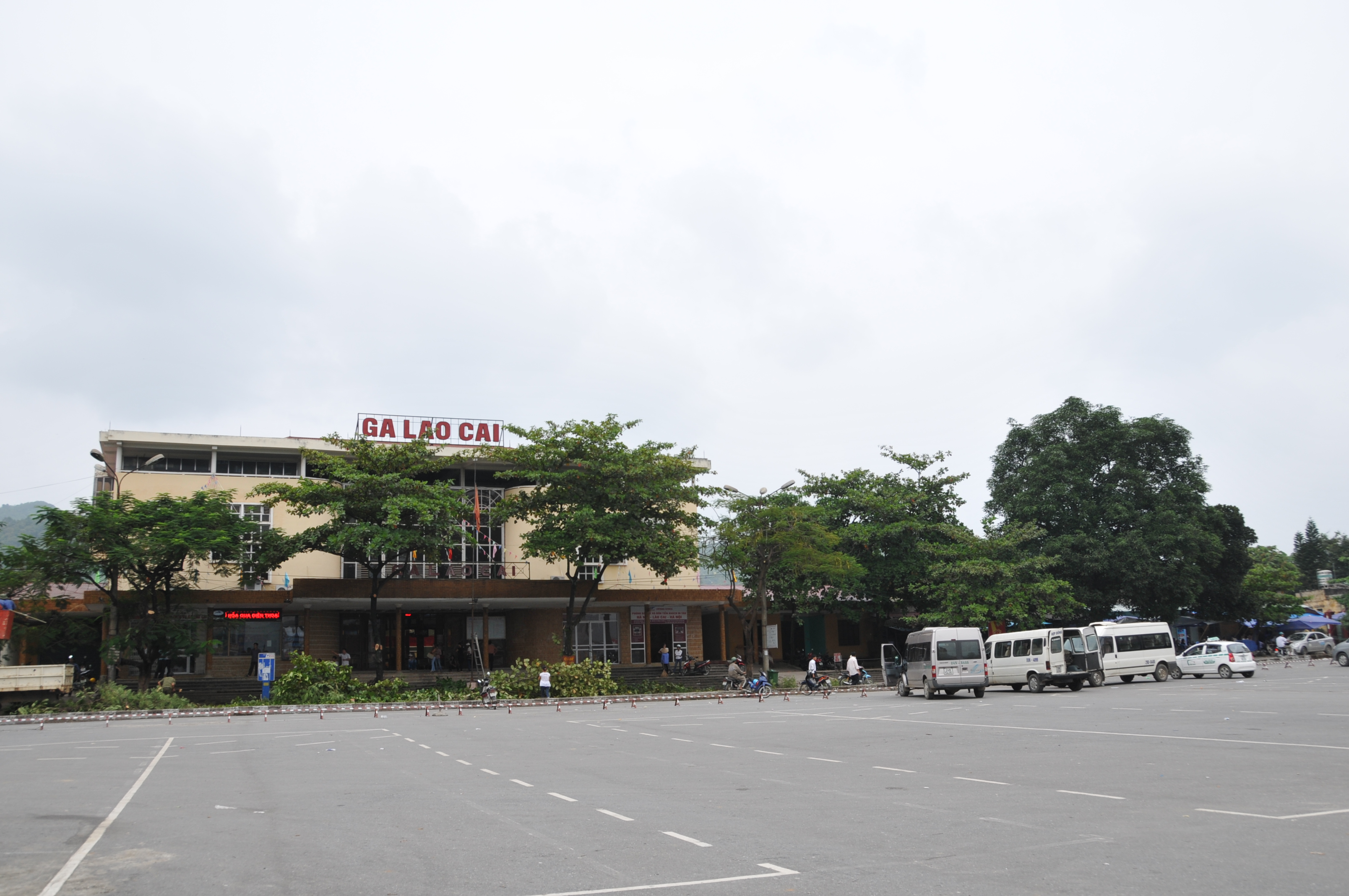

General information
- Location: Lào Cai, Lào Cai Province; Vietnam
- Line: Hanoi–Lào Cai Railway
Location

Lào Cai station is a railway station in Vietnam. It serves the border town of Lào Cai, in Lào Cai Province. Several passenger trains a day run between Hanoi and Lao Cai.

Lao Cai Station is the last station of the Hanoi–Lao Cai railway, the Vietnamese section of the meter-gauge Kunming–Hai Phong Railway. North of Lao Cai Station, the railway continues, crossing the Nanxi River into China, but it carries only freight trains, and no passenger service.

On 20 February 2025 the Vietnamese parliament approved an $8 billion railroad investment to upgrade under Xi Jinping's Belt and road initiative the old French-built Kunming–Haiphong railway, which serves the Chinese border county Hekou, Lao Cai, Hanoi and Haiphong.
