= 1946 in French Indochina =

- Decades: 1920s; 1930s; 1940s; 1950s
- See also: Other events of 1946; History of Vietnam

The following lists events that happened during 1946 in French Indochina.

== Events ==
=== January ===
- January 26 - French troops clashed with Vietnamese rebels at Phong Thổ District in the first battle between the two sides in French Indochina. The Viet Quoc Armed Force unit under Deo Van Bao surrendered after a two-day battle.

=== February ===
- February 7 – In its colony in Vietnam, the military forces of France made a large scale assault to recapture the Bến Tre Province, which had been under control of the Việt Minh since August 25, 1945. The province was quickly brought back under French rule, but guerrilla activity continued.
- February 28 – Ho Chi Minh, the newly elected President of North Vietnam, sent a telegram to U.S. President Harry S. Truman, asking that the United States use its influence to persuade France not to send occupation forces back into Vietnam, and to "interfere urgently in support of our independence". Truman's reply was that the U.S. would support France, and Ho sought assistance from the Soviet Union instead.

=== March ===
- March 6 – North Vietnam agreed to allow troops from France to return to its cities in return for recognition as "a free country within the framework of the French Union". General Võ Nguyên Giáp later wrote that the intent was for the peaceful withdrawal of Nationalist Chinese occupation, but that a new war began when French forces continued their occupation.
