= Paul-Joseph Bodin =

French engineer

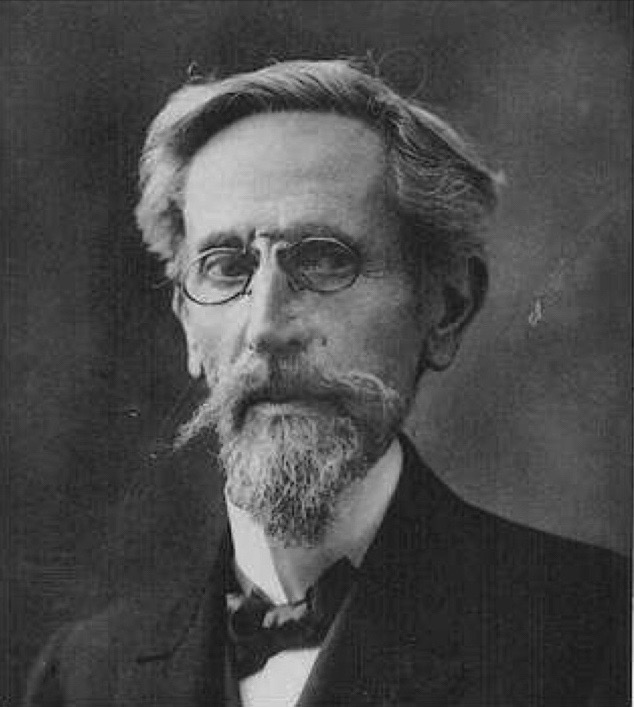
- Born: September 20, 1847; Saumur, France
- Died: February 16, 1926 (aged 78); Paris, France
- Education: Centrale
- Occupation: Engineer
- Known for: Viaur Viaduct
- Parent: Camille Bodin-Legendre (father)

Paul-Joseph Bodin (September 20, 1847, Saumur – February 16, 1926, Paris) was a French engineer. He is credited, among other things, with the construction of the Viaur Viaduct near Aveyron in Southern France in 1902.

== Biography ==
The son of architect and archaeologist Camille Bodin-Legendre, he graduated from Centrale in 1871.

After serving as a captain aide-major during the Franco-Prussian War of 1870, he joined the Société de construction des Batignolles (SCB) as an engineer in 1873. He specialized in the study and execution of major projects involving bridges and metal structures.

In 1883, he became a lecturer and professor at the École centrale de Paris. He became a member of its council in 1897 and taught there until 1919, becoming an honorary professor afterwards, after declining the directorship of the school in 1911. He was one of the founders and presidents of the Société des amis de l'École centrale and the Maison des Centraux. He also served as president of the Caisse de secours des élèves for twenty-five years.

Bodin became president of the Société nouvelle des Mines d'Hamimaté, managing director of the Société franco-tunisienne d'entreprises et travaux métalliques and the Société française d'entreprises au Brésil, as well as director of Chargeurs d'Extrême-Orient.

Having become chief engineer of the SCB, Jules Goüin appointed him to the board of directors and the management committee.

He was president of the Société des ingénieurs civils de France in 1903, of the general Congress of civil engineering, and of the École Spéciale d'Architecture, a member of the Superior Council of Public Works, the Council of the Syndicate Chamber of Metal Construction of France, and numerous other commissions.

He is buried in the Planques cemetery in Albi.

== Honours ==
- Officer of the Legion of Honour
- Officer of the Academy
- Knight of the Order of Christ (Portugal)

He also received the gold medal at the Exposition Universelle in Paris in 1889 as a collaborator of the Société de construction des Batignolles, especially for the Viaur Viaduct project, and the Montyon Prize (scientific category) in 1903 for his conception of "balanced arches."

== Tribute ==
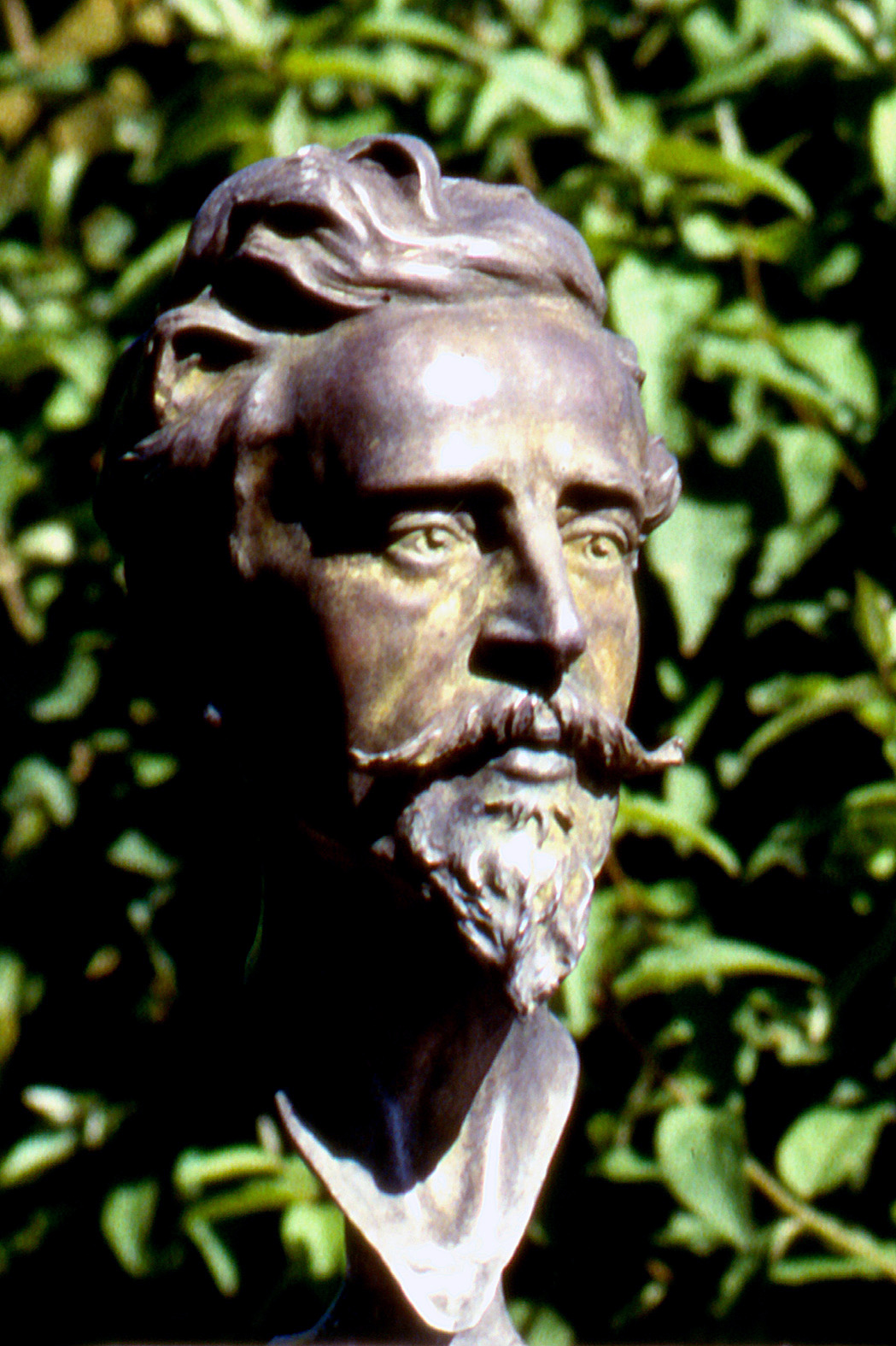
Bust of Paul-Joseph Bodin, Viaur Viaduct

In 1932, Paul-Bodin Street in the 17th arrondissement of Paris was named in his honour.

A boulevard in Albi also bears his name.

The village of Tanus named its main road (formerly RN 88) Avenue Paul-Bodin.

== Selected works ==
- Viaur Viaduct (1902)
- Trinity Bridge (1897)
- Pont-Aven Footbridge (1907)
- Faux Namti Bridge (1907)
- Asopos Viaduct (1908)
