= Viaur Viaduct =

Coordinates: 44.1233°N 2.3317°E

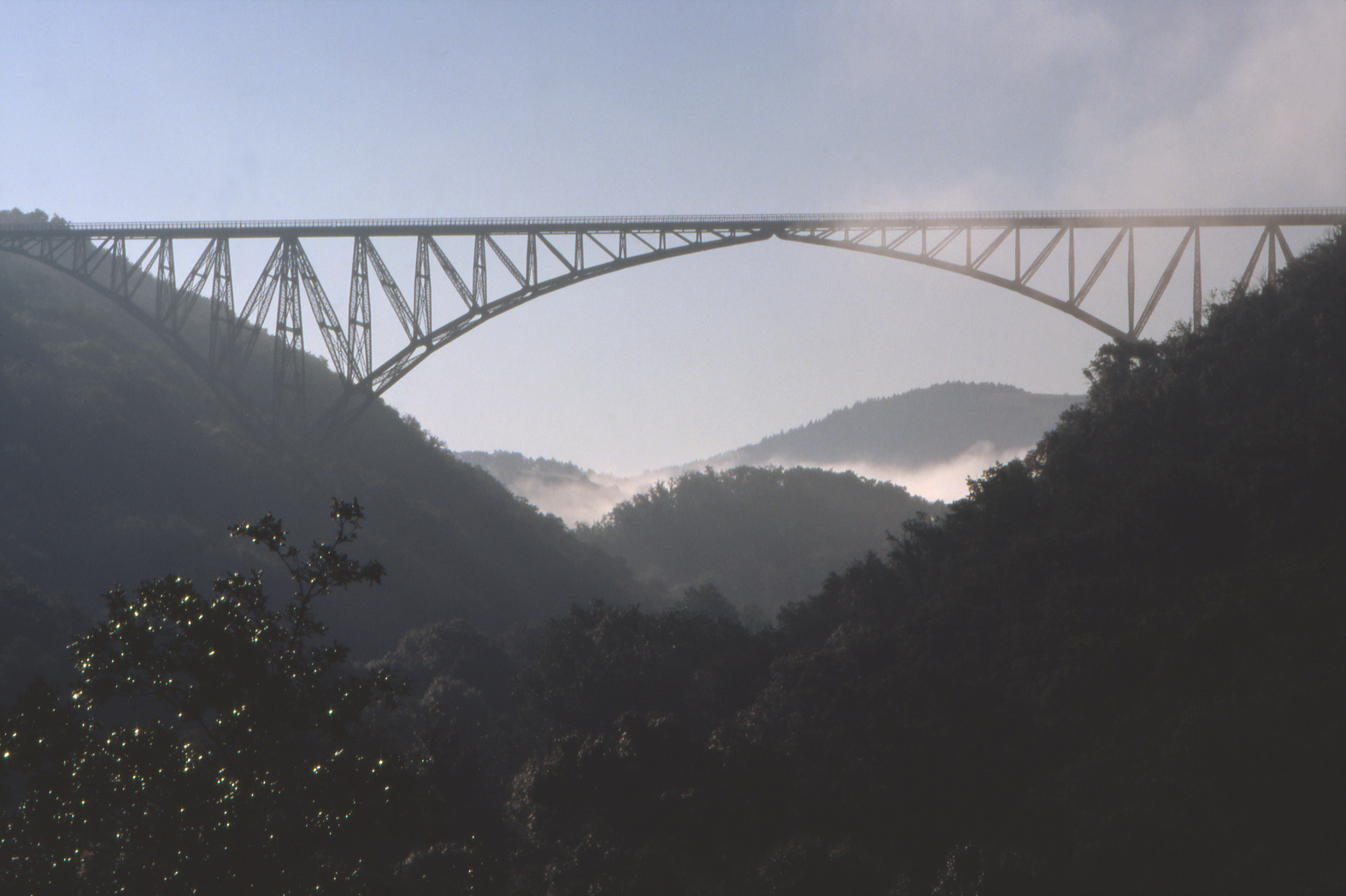
The Viaduct seen from the west

The Viaur Viaduct (Viaduc du Viaur in French) near Aveyron, was the first large steel bridge built in France.

The 220m arch bridge was completed in 1902 under the direction of Paul-Joseph Bodin, a French engineer . The single-track viaduct is located along the Carmaux-Rodez rail line. Built by the Société de Construction des Batignolles, it was the longest metallic arch span constructed up to that point in time. The viaduct contains an estimated 3800 tons of metal, with a total cost (including the masonry abutments) of around 2 700 000 French francs.

== See also ==
- List of bridges in France
