= Huanghe Whirlwind =

Henan Huanghe Whirlwind Co., Ltd. 河南黄河旋风股份有限公司
- Traded as: SSE: 600172
- Industry: Manufacturing enterprise
- Founded: 1998
- Headquarters: No. 200 Renmin Road, Changge City, Henan, China
- Products: Superhard materials, superhard material products, UDS series diamond presses, construction machinery
- Website: Official website

Henan Huanghe Whirlwind Co., Ltd., abbreviated as Huanghe Whirlwind (Chinese: 黄河旋风), is a company that produces superhard materials, located at Changge City, Henan, China.

== History ==
Huanghe Whirlwind was established in November 1998 by Henan Huanghe Industrial Group Co., Ltd., Diamond Industrial Co., Ltd. of Osaka, Japan, and Zhengzhou Research Institute of Abrasives & Grinding, and was listed on the Shanghai Stock Exchange on November 26, 1998 (SSE: 600172).

== Products ==
Main products include superhard materials, superhard material products, UDS series diamond presses, and construction machinery, among which superhard materials and superhard material products are the leading products. It is one of China's largest synthetic diamond companies.
