= Changge =

Changge 长葛市 Changko
- County-level city
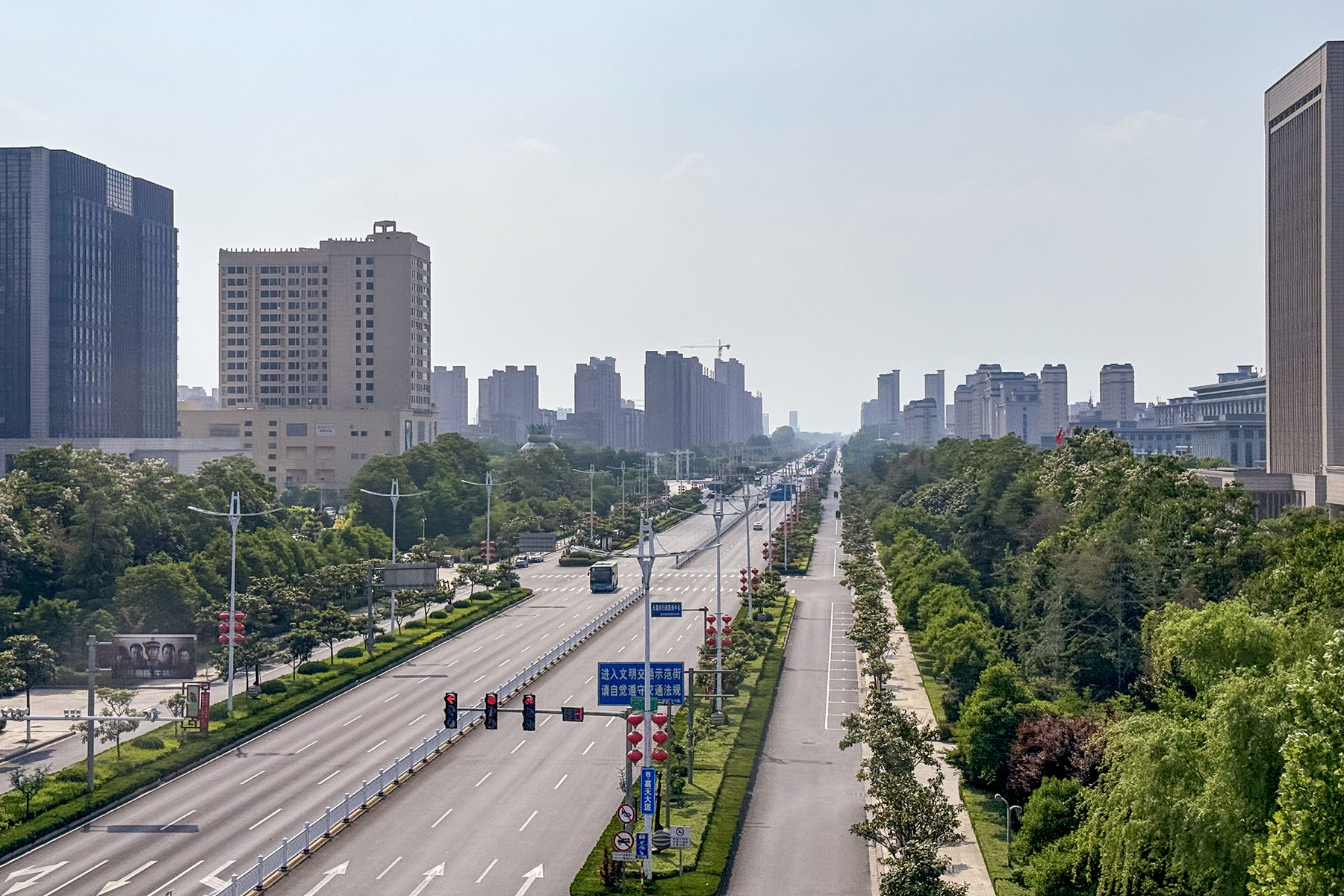

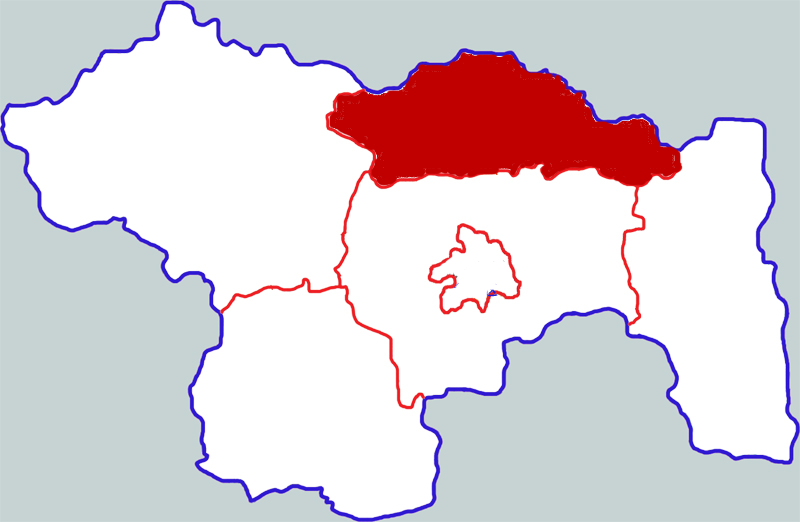
- Changge in Xuchang

- Location in Henan
- Coordinates: 34°12′49.21″N 113°45′46.55″E
- Country: People's Republic of China
- Province: Henan
- Prefecture-level city: Xuchang

Area
  - Total: 650 km^{2} (250 sq mi)

Population (2019)
  - Total: 698,600
- Time zone: UTC+8 (China Standard)
- Postal code: 461500

Changge (simplified Chinese: 长葛; traditional Chinese: 長葛; pinyin: Chánggě) is a county-level city under the administration of the prefecture-level city of Xuchang, in the central part of central Henan Province, China. In the Han dynasty, it was known as Changshe (长社; 長社; Chángshè). It ranges in latitude from 34° 09' to 34° 20'N and longitude from 113° 34' to 114° 08'E. According to the sixth national population census in 2010, Changge's population is about 687,081. It borders the province capital Zhengzhou to the north, the ancient capitals Luo Yang to the west and Kaifeng to the east, the city is about 21.4 kilometers from the north and South, and 51.9 kilometers east–west.

== History ==
Changge is a historical city; it has a diverse culture. The name of this area, Changge, has been changed several time, from Changge to Changshe, and finally called as Changge in the Sui dynasty (569 AD). As the name of Changge could be found in the Zuo Zhuan, "鲁隐公五年，宋人代郑围长葛", the place's name has existed since 718 BC. It is said that Changge is the place where a famous ancient tribe's chief, Ge Tianshi, lived. To commemorate that period of life, the generations called this region Changge.

== Administrative divisions ==
As a county-level city, Changge administers 4 subdistricts, 8 towns, 4 townships and 357 village committees.

Subdistricts

- Jianshelu Subdistrict (建设路街道)
- Changxinglu Subdistrict (长兴路街道)
- Changshelu Subdistrict (长社路街道)
- Jinqiaolu Subdistrict (金桥路街道)

Towns

- Heshangqiao (和尚桥镇)
- Pohu (坡胡镇)
- Houhe (后河镇)
- Shigu (石固镇)
- Laocheng (老城镇)
- Nanxi (南席镇)
- Dazhou (大周镇)
- Dongcun (董村镇

Townships

- Zengfumiao Township (增福庙乡)
- Guanting Township (官亭乡)
- Shixiang Township (石象乡)
- Guqiao Township (古桥乡)

== Geography and climate ==
Changge has a warm temperate monsoon climate; there has abundant sunlight and the geothermal is very rich. With four distinct seasons, winters are cool and dry, summers hot and humid, spring begins early and is warm, and autumn provides a reasonable transition. The average annual temperate is about 14.3 °C, average annual rainfall is 711.1mm, and 217 frost-free days per year. With several rivers come across Changge, its water resources is very rich.

Climate data for Changge, elevation 104 m (341 ft), (1991–2020 normals, extremes 1981–2010)
| Month | Jan | Feb | Mar | Apr | May | Jun | Jul | Aug | Sep | Oct | Nov | Dec | Year |
|---|---|---|---|---|---|---|---|---|---|---|---|---|---|
| Record high °C (°F) | 20.4 (68.7) | 23.6 (74.5) | 28.9 (84.0) | 34.2 (93.6) | 39.4 (102.9) | 40.3 (104.5) | 40.4 (104.7) | 38.8 (101.8) | 37.6 (99.7) | 35.8 (96.4) | 28.2 (82.8) | 22.4 (72.3) | 40.4 (104.7) |
| Mean daily maximum °C (°F) | 6.2 (43.2) | 9.9 (49.8) | 15.6 (60.1) | 22.0 (71.6) | 27.6 (81.7) | 32.1 (89.8) | 32.1 (89.8) | 30.7 (87.3) | 27.1 (80.8) | 22.0 (71.6) | 14.6 (58.3) | 8.2 (46.8) | 20.7 (69.2) |
| Daily mean °C (°F) | 0.9 (33.6) | 4.1 (39.4) | 9.6 (49.3) | 15.8 (60.4) | 21.5 (70.7) | 26.1 (79.0) | 27.3 (81.1) | 26.0 (78.8) | 21.4 (70.5) | 15.9 (60.6) | 8.8 (47.8) | 2.9 (37.2) | 15.0 (59.0) |
| Mean daily minimum °C (°F) | −3.2 (26.2) | −0.4 (31.3) | 4.5 (40.1) | 10.1 (50.2) | 15.8 (60.4) | 20.6 (69.1) | 23.4 (74.1) | 22.3 (72.1) | 17.0 (62.6) | 11.1 (52.0) | 4.2 (39.6) | −1.2 (29.8) | 10.4 (50.6) |
| Record low °C (°F) | −18.1 (−0.6) | −21.6 (−6.9) | −7.6 (18.3) | −2.4 (27.7) | 3.1 (37.6) | 11.4 (52.5) | 16.4 (61.5) | 12.4 (54.3) | 6.3 (43.3) | −1.4 (29.5) | −11.7 (10.9) | −13.3 (8.1) | −21.6 (−6.9) |
| Average precipitation mm (inches) | 11.0 (0.43) | 13.0 (0.51) | 24.7 (0.97) | 37.8 (1.49) | 61.0 (2.40) | 78.2 (3.08) | 167.3 (6.59) | 120.0 (4.72) | 80.0 (3.15) | 41.6 (1.64) | 30.1 (1.19) | 10.5 (0.41) | 675.2 (26.58) |
| Average precipitation days (≥ 0.1 mm) | 3.8 | 4.3 | 5.2 | 6.2 | 7.3 | 7.5 | 10.6 | 9.9 | 8.9 | 6.1 | 5.5 | 3.4 | 78.7 |
| Average snowy days | 3.9 | 3.0 | 1.2 | 0.1 | 0 | 0 | 0 | 0 | 0 | 0 | 1.0 | 2.6 | 11.8 |
| Average relative humidity (%) | 62 | 62 | 61 | 65 | 64 | 63 | 78 | 80 | 75 | 68 | 67 | 62 | 67 |
| Mean monthly sunshine hours | 123.0 | 136.5 | 177.0 | 203.8 | 217.5 | 201.9 | 191.6 | 184.9 | 158.1 | 159.0 | 141.3 | 133.1 | 2,027.7 |
| Percentage possible sunshine | 39 | 44 | 47 | 52 | 50 | 47 | 44 | 45 | 43 | 46 | 46 | 44 | 46 |
Source: China Meteorological Administration

== Agriculture and industry ==
Changge is one of the eight pilot municipalities, it has a solid foundation of agriculture, and also has diverse industry categories. There are several large-scale enterprise groups, include Huanghe Whirlwind, Benma Company, Topin Group Company, etc.

== Education ==
During the Ming and Qing dynasties, there were nearly 200 sites of private school, Confucius college and community-run schools charging with no tuition. Nowadays, the Changge government still treasures the education industry. There are many schools here, from kindergarten to technical school.

- Changge first senior high school

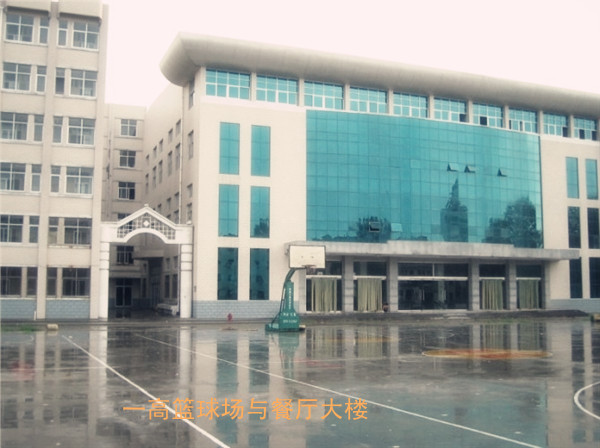
Changge first senior high school

- Changge second senior high school

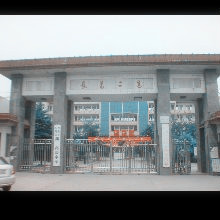
Changge second senior high school entrance

== Celebrity ==
Zhong Yao (151-230), native of Yingchuan in Yuzhou State (today's Changge), styled himself Yuanchang. He was an important minister in Kingdom of Wei of the Three Kingdoms period. Zhong Yao was appointed as the tutor of prince, after he died the emperor gave Chenghou as his posthumous title. The most accomplished area for Zhong Yao is in calligraphy, and he was known as the bell King with Jin dynasty calligraphy Wang Xizhi.

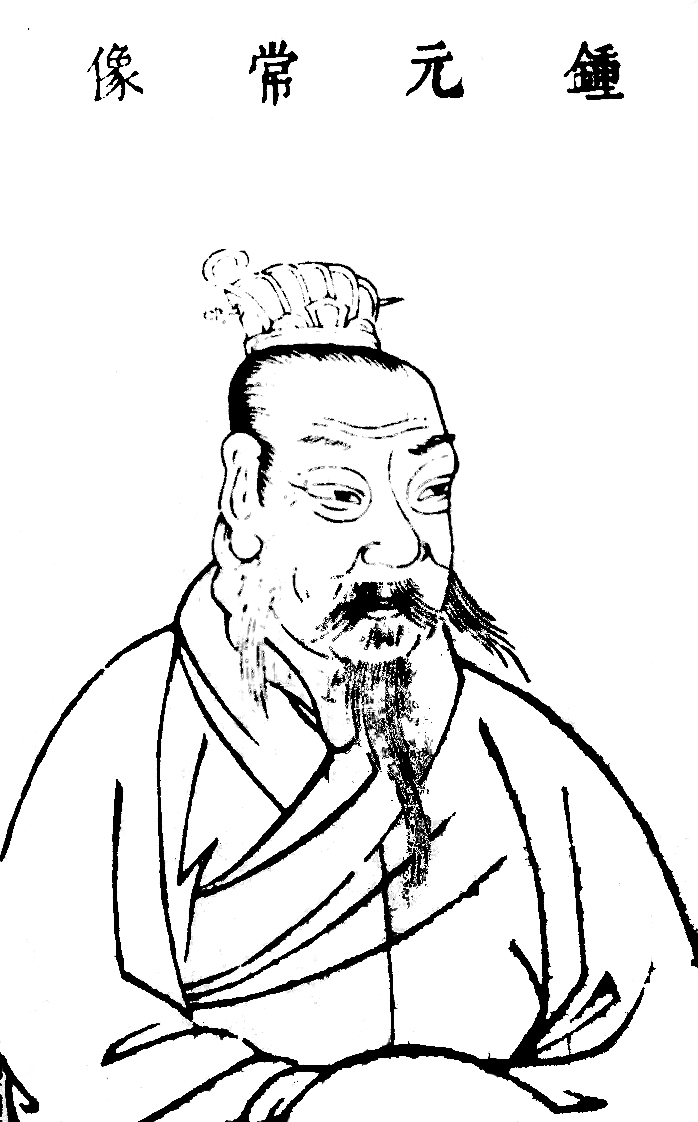
Zhong Yao

== Tourism ==
Changge, as a city of central China, has a deep history culture. The tourism sights are mostly artificial landscapes which include:

- Shi Gu Relic
- Ge Tian Ecological Park
- Zhong Yuan Iron Buddha
- Fu Ergang Reservoir
- Zhong Zhou Humanities Museum
