= Pingbian Miao Autonomous County =

Pingbian County 屏边县 · Pinx Binb Xenf
- Autonomous county
- 屏边苗族自治县; Pinx Binb Hmongb Zif Zhif Xenf; Pingbian Miao Autonomous County
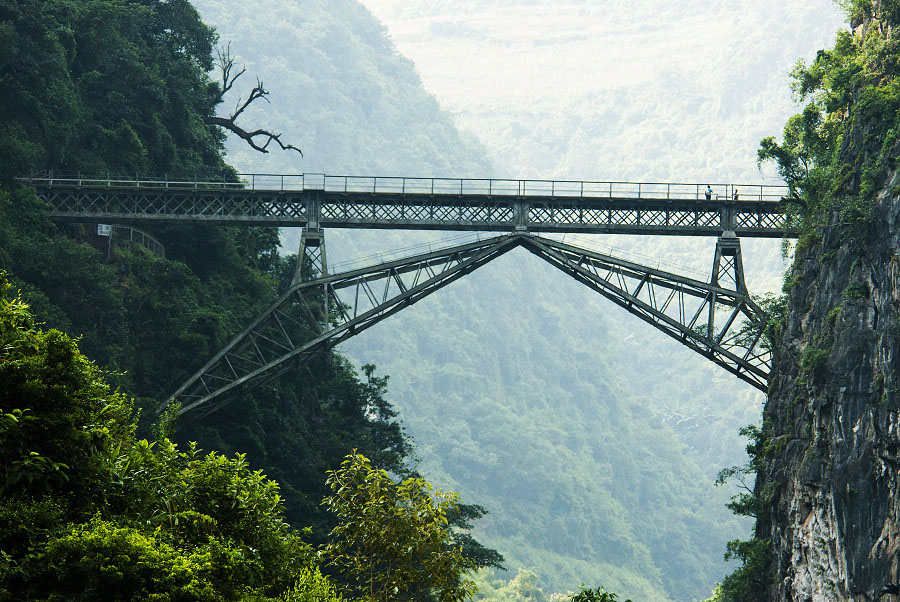
- Wujiazhai railway bridge

- Location of Pingbian County in Honghe Prefecture within Yunnan

- Location of the seat in Yunnan
- Coordinates: 22°59′13″N 103°40′30″E
- Country: China
- Province: Yunnan
- Autonomous prefecture: Honghe
- County seat: Yuping

Area
  - Total: 1,905 km^{2} (736 sq mi)
- Elevation: 1,414 m (4,639 ft)

Population (2020 census)
  - Total: 129,448
  - Density: 67.95/km^{2} (176.0/sq mi)
- Time zone: UTC+8 (China Standard)
- Postal code: 661200
- Area code: 0873
- Website: www.hhpb.gov.cn

Pingbian Miao Autonomous County (simplified Chinese: 屏边苗族自治县; traditional Chinese: 屏邊苗族自治縣; pinyin: Píngbiān Miáozú Zìzhìxiàn; Hmong: Pinx Binb Hmongb Zif Zhif Xenf) is a county located in Honghe Hani and Yi Autonomous Prefecture in the southeast of Yunnan province, China. Its seat is located only 21 kilometres (13 mi) from the border with Lào Cai Province, Vietnam.

== Geography ==
Pingbian County is located in the southeast of Honghe Prefecture in southeastern Yunnan and borders Wenshan City and Maguan County to the east, Hekou Yao Autonomous County to the south, Mengzi City to the north and Gejiu to the west.

== Administrative divisions ==
Pingbian Miao Autonomous County has 4 towns and 3 townships.

4 towns

- Yuping (玉屏镇)
- Xinxian (新现镇)
- Heping (和平镇)
- Baihe (白河镇)

3 townships

- Baiyun (白云乡)
- Xinhua (新华乡)
- Wantang (湾塘乡)

== Climate ==
Pingbian County has a mild subtropical highland climate (Köppen Cwb) influenced by its elevation, with short, mild, dry winters and warm, humid summers. The monthly 24-hour average temperature ranges from 9.2 °C (48.6 °F) in January to 21.3 °C (70.3 °F) in July, and the annual mean is 16.3 °C (61.3 °F). The greatest rainfall tends to occur during the summer; spring is the sunniest season.

Climate data for Pingbian, elevation 1,414 m (4,639 ft), (1991–2020 normals, extremes 1971–2010)
Month	Jan	Feb	Mar	Apr	May	Jun	Jul	Aug	Sep	Oct	Nov	Dec	Year
Record high °C (°F)	23.3 (73.9)	27.1 (80.8)	29.0 (84.2)	30.6 (87.1)	31.5 (88.7)	29.8 (85.6)	30.7 (87.3)	31.0 (87.8)	30.1 (86.2)	27.6 (81.7)	26.9 (80.4)	23.2 (73.8)	31.5 (88.7)
Mean daily maximum °C (°F)	13.6 (56.5)	16.0 (60.8)	20.2 (68.4)	23.6 (74.5)	25.0 (77.0)	25.8 (78.4)	25.5 (77.9)	25.6 (78.1)	24.2 (75.6)	21.0 (69.8)	18.4 (65.1)	14.6 (58.3)	21.1 (70.0)
Daily mean °C (°F)	9.5 (49.1)	11.4 (52.5)	14.8 (58.6)	18.1 (64.6)	20.3 (68.5)	21.6 (70.9)	21.3 (70.3)	21.1 (70.0)	19.7 (67.5)	17.2 (63.0)	13.9 (57.0)	10.4 (50.7)	16.6 (61.9)
Mean daily minimum °C (°F)	7.0 (44.6)	8.6 (47.5)	11.5 (52.7)	14.7 (58.5)	17.2 (63.0)	19.0 (66.2)	18.8 (65.8)	18.4 (65.1)	17.2 (63.0)	15.0 (59.0)	11.3 (52.3)	7.9 (46.2)	13.9 (57.0)
Record low °C (°F)	−0.8 (30.6)	0.0 (32.0)	−1.7 (28.9)	3.6 (38.5)	9.6 (49.3)	12.8 (55.0)	13.8 (56.8)	14.0 (57.2)	9.9 (49.8)	6.2 (43.2)	2.3 (36.1)	−1.4 (29.5)	−1.7 (28.9)
Average precipitation mm (inches)	37.1 (1.46)	28.6 (1.13)	56.8 (2.24)	98.2 (3.87)	155.1 (6.11)	232.5 (9.15)	325.7 (12.82)	303.7 (11.96)	174.2 (6.86)	93.2 (3.67)	53.8 (2.12)	34.0 (1.34)	1,592.9 (62.73)
Average precipitation days (≥ 0.1 mm)	14.5	13.5	14.0	14.1	17.6	21.5	22.8	21.7	17.3	14.7	10.5	10.9	193.1
Average snowy days	0.2	0	0.1	0	0	0	0	0	0	0	0	0.1	0.4
Average relative humidity (%)	90	86	83	82	82	86	88	88	87	88	86	88	86
Mean monthly sunshine hours	95.6	114.2	148.6	179.2	179.5	130.7	116.5	133.1	121.2	92.3	122.3	102.1	1,535.3
Percentage possible sunshine	28	36	40	47	44	32	28	34	33	26	37	31	35
Source 1: China Meteorological Administration
Source 2: Weather China

== Transportation ==
The narrow-gauge Kunming–Hai Phong Railway crosses Pingbian County. This railway's famous Faux Namti Bridge is located north of the county's Wantang Township (湾塘乡).
