= Hekou Yao Autonomous County =

Hekou County 河口县
- Autonomous county
- 河口瑶族自治县; Hekou Yao Autonomous County
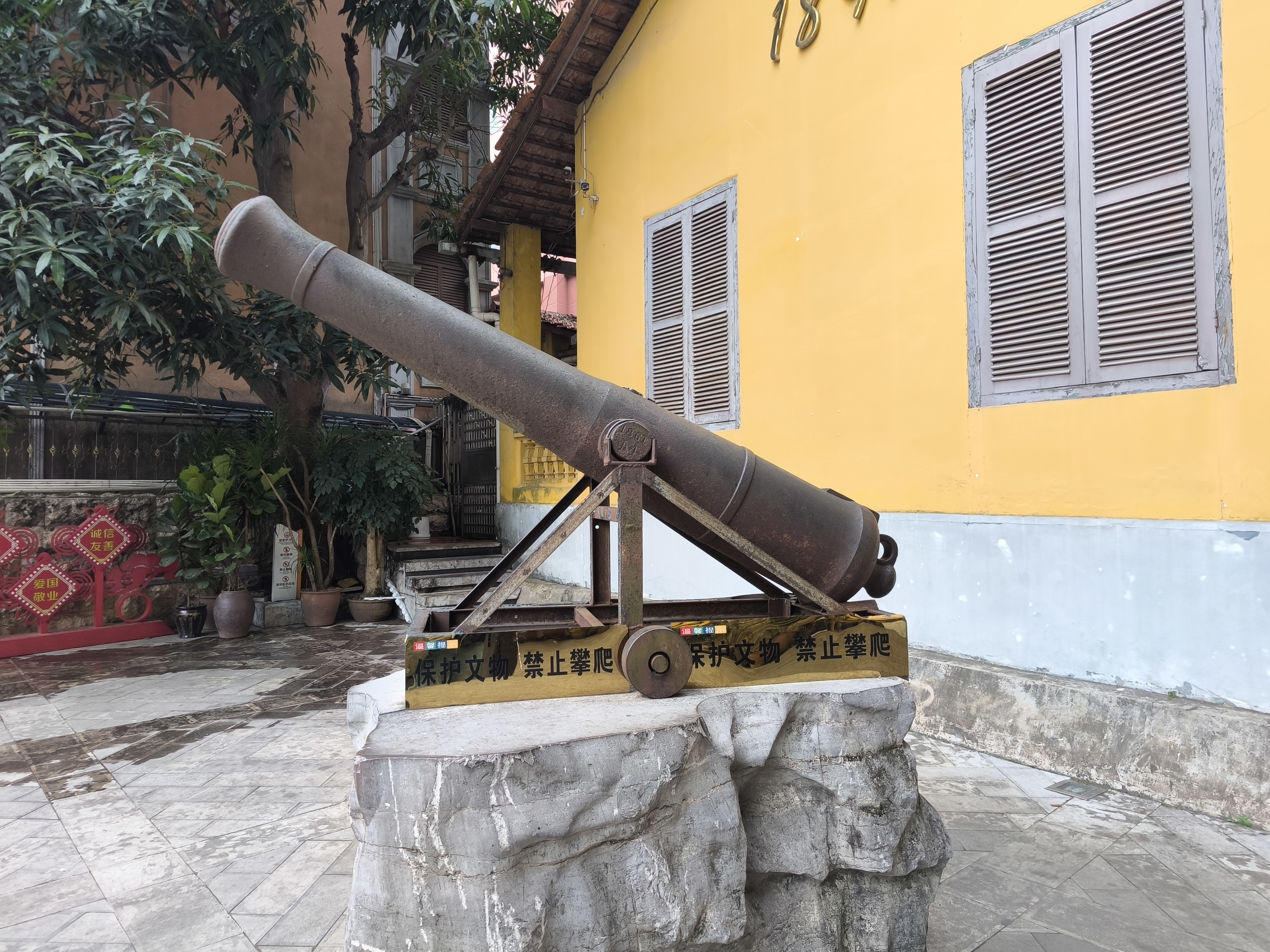
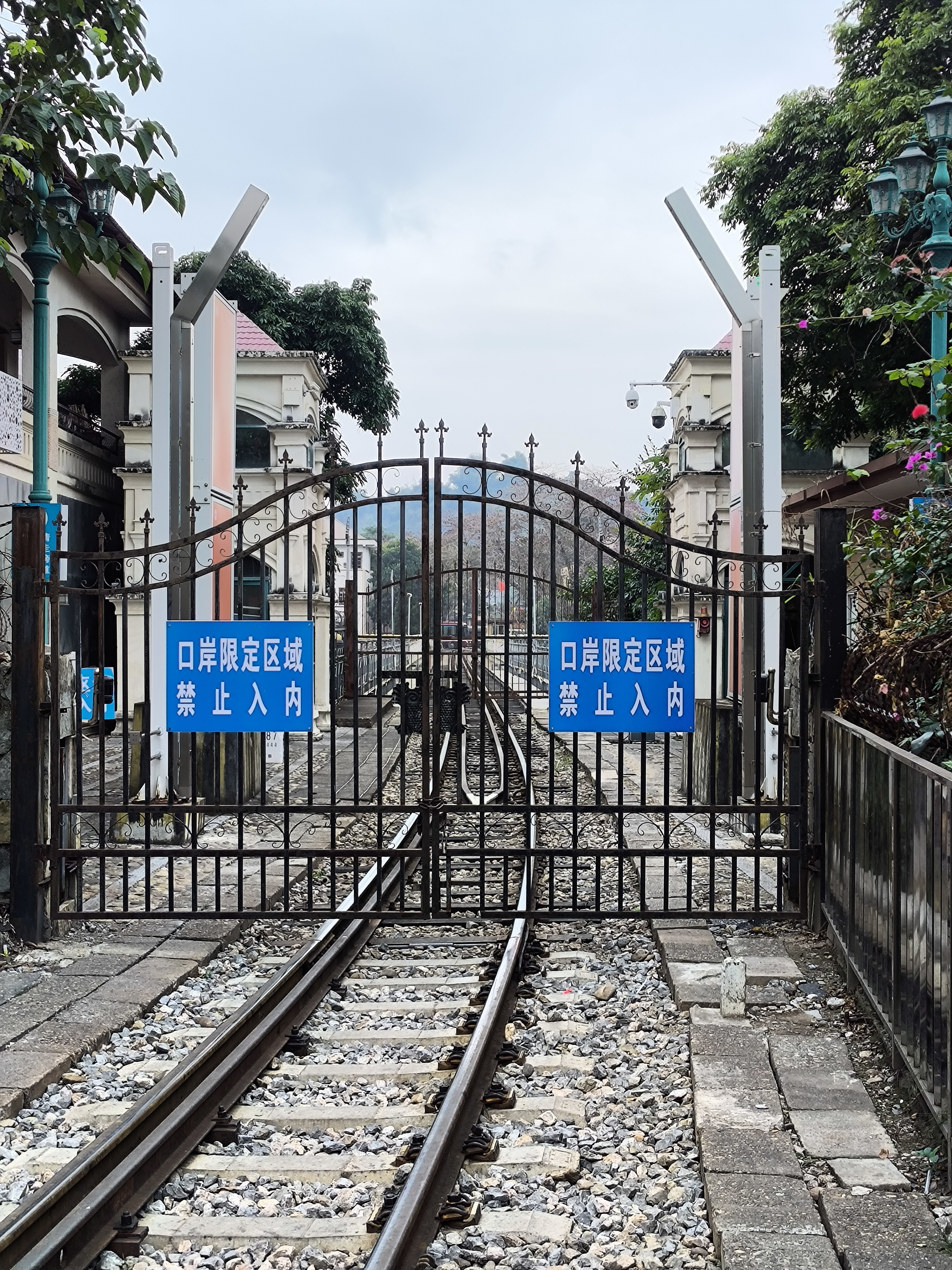
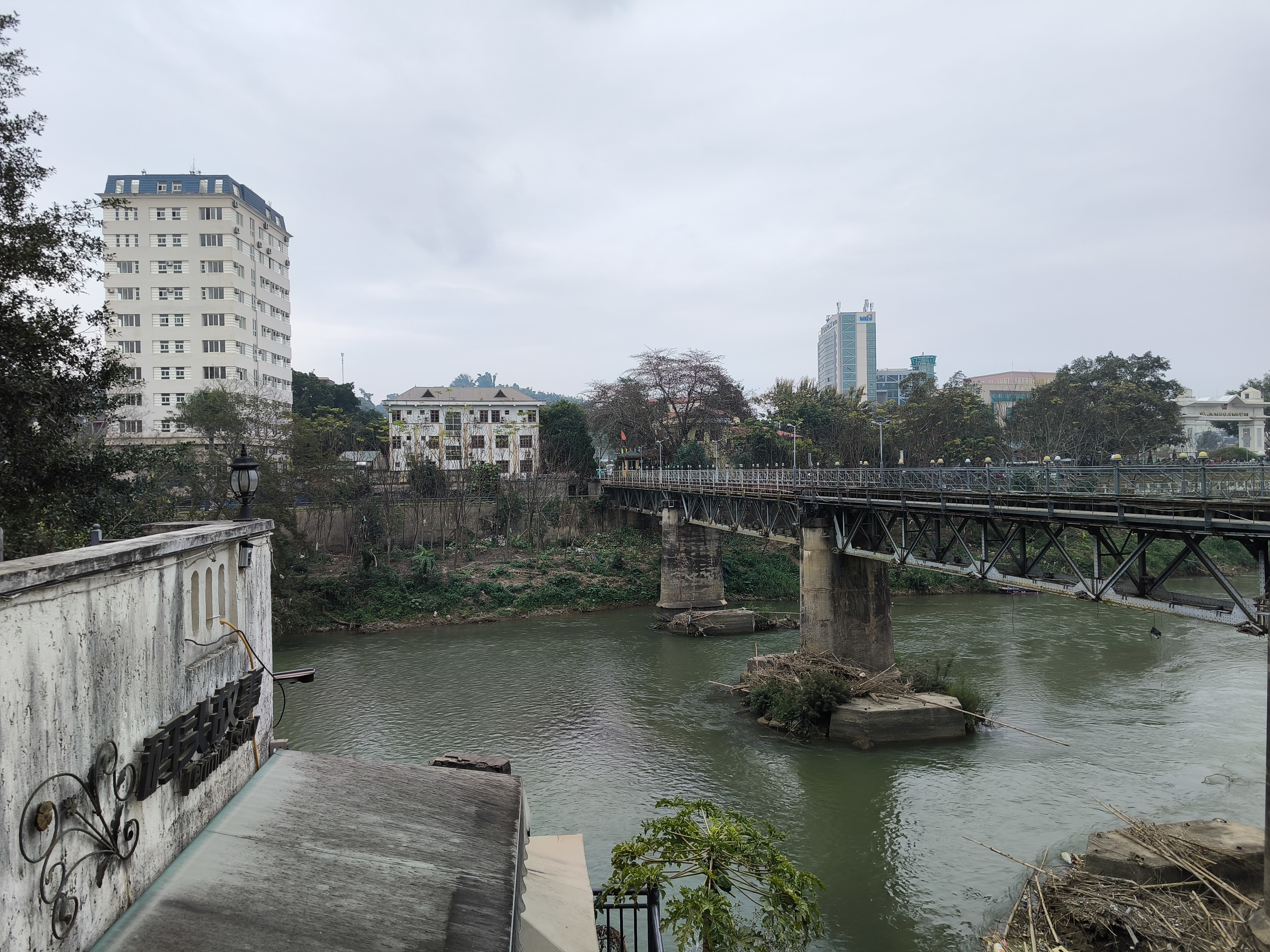
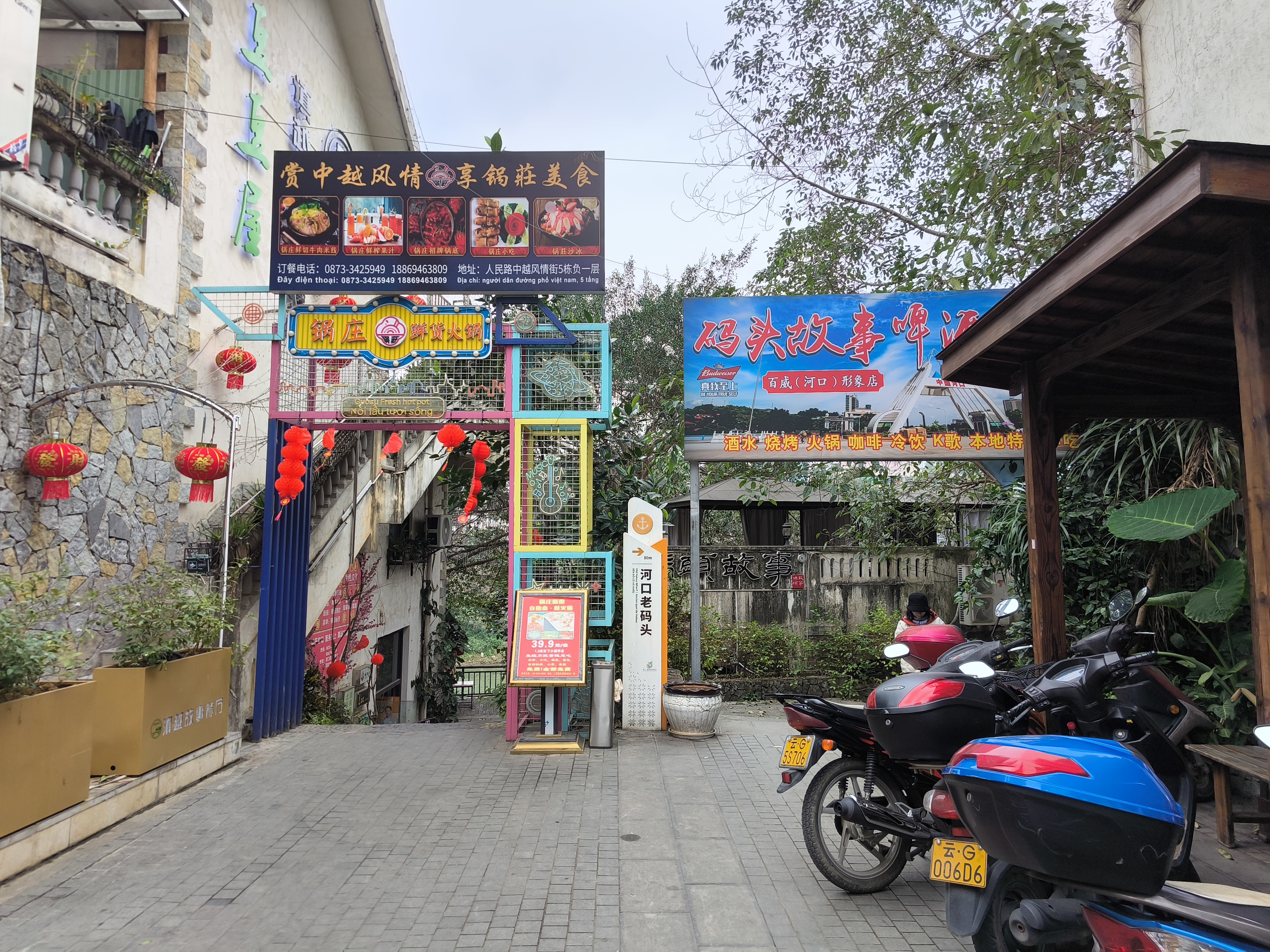
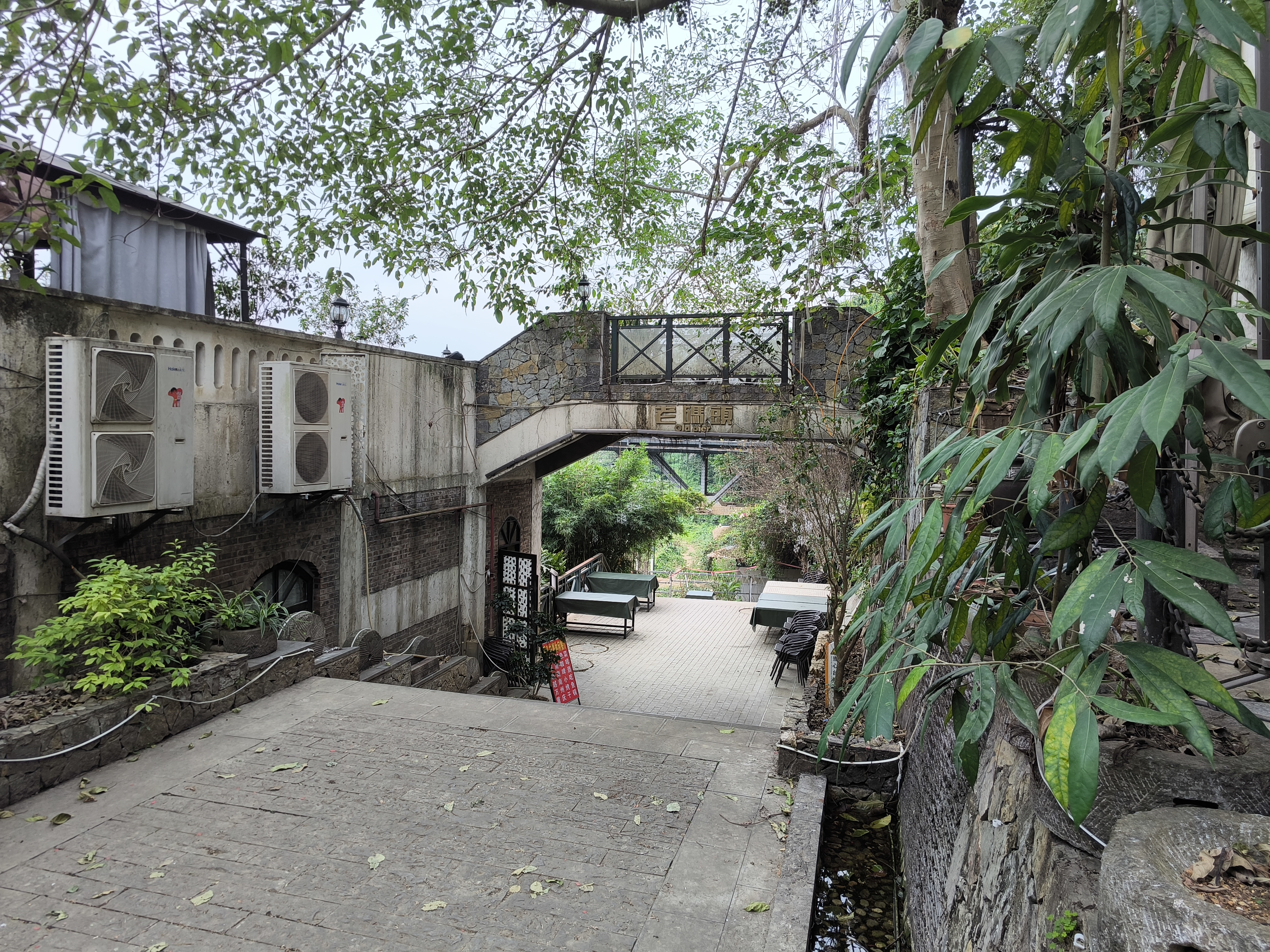

- Location of Hekou County in Honghe Prefecture within Yunnan province

- Location of the seat in Yunnan Hekou (China)
- Coordinates: 22°31′44″N 103°56′20″E
- Country: China
- Province: Yunnan
- Autonomous prefecture: Honghe
- County seat: Hekou

Area
  - Total: 1,313 km^{2} (507 sq mi)

Population (2020 census)
  - Total: 101,971
  - Density: 77.66/km^{2} (201.1/sq mi)
- Time zone: UTC+8 (CST)
- Postal code: 661300
- Area code: 0873
- Website: www.hhhk.gov.cn

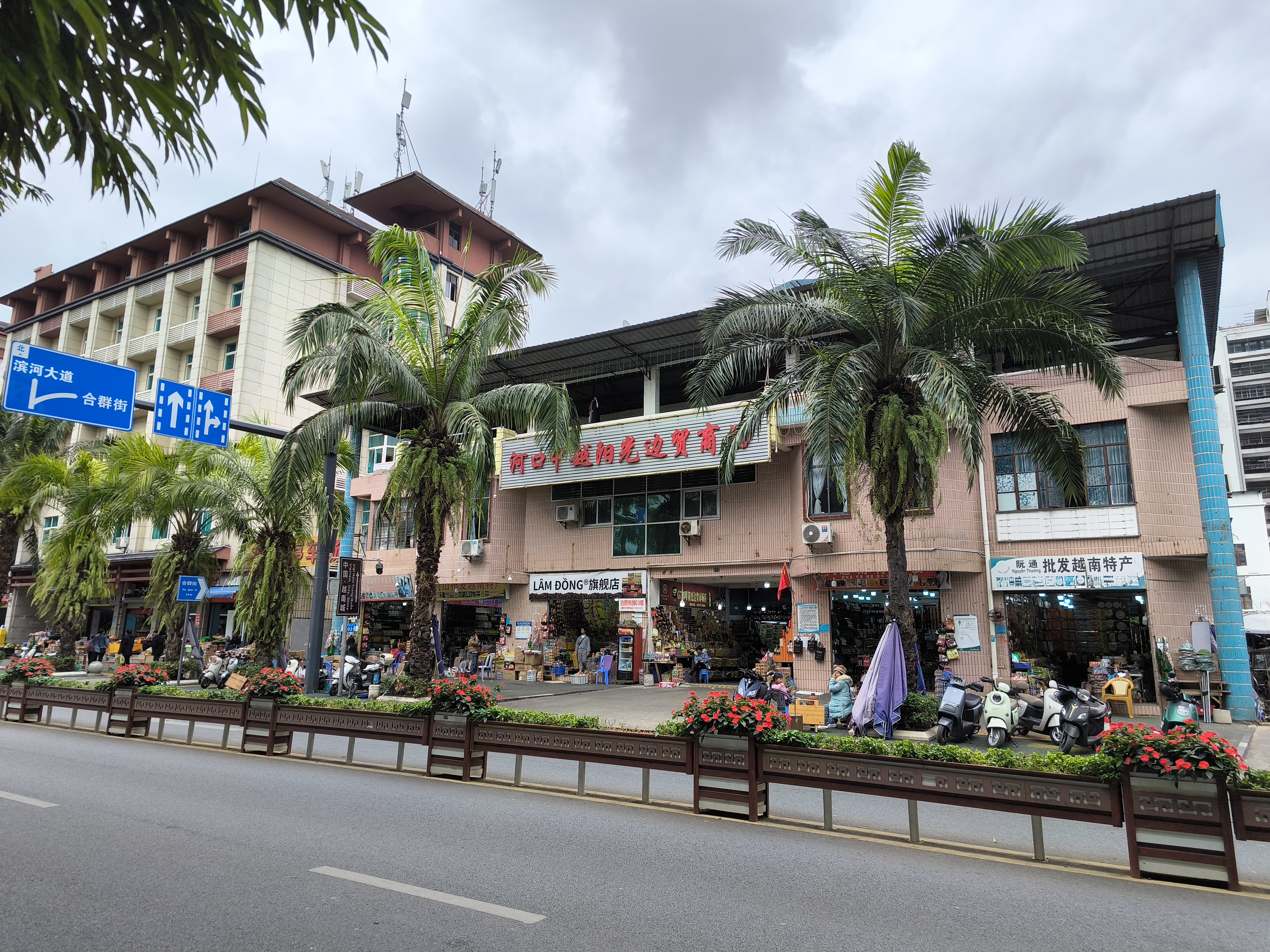
Hekou China-Vietnam Sunshine Border Trade Market

The Hekou Yao Autonomous County (simplified Chinese: 河口瑶族自治县; traditional Chinese: 河口瑤族自治縣; pinyin: Hékǒu Yáozú Zìzhìxiàn) is an autonomous county in the southern part of the Yunnan province of China. It is part of the Honghe Hani and Yi Autonomous Prefecture and borders the northern Vietnamese city of Lào Cai.

== Geography ==
Hekou County is located in the southeast of Honghe Prefecture in southeastern Yunnan. It borders Pingbian Miao Autonomous County, Maguan County and Gejiu to the north, Jinping Miao, Yao, and Dai Autonomous County to the west, and Lào Cai Province, Vietnam to the south and east. the Districts of Lào Cai Province that border Hekou County are Bat Xat District, Bao Thang District, Muong Khuong District and Lào Cai.

== Administrative divisions ==
At present, Hekou Yao Autonomous County has 2 towns, 3 townships and 1 ethnic township.

2 towns

- Hekou (河口镇)
- Nanxi (南溪镇)

3 townships

- Laofanzhai (老范寨乡)
- Yaoshan (瑶山乡)
- Lianhuatan (莲花滩乡)

1 ethnic township

- Qiaotou Miao and Zhuang Ethnic Township (桥头苗族壮族乡)

== Ethnic groups ==
The Hekou County Gazetteer (1994) lists the following ethnic groups.

- Yao
  - Hongtou Yao 红头谣 (autonyms: Mian 棉, Meng 孟, Dongban Heiyou 洞斑黑尤, meaning "Yao person")
  - Landian Yao 兰綻瑶 (autonyms: Xiu 秀, Xiumen 秀门, Men 门, Houmen 喉闷)
  - White Yao 白线瑶 (autonyms: Heiyou Meng 黑尤蒙, Gengmen 耿闷, Jingdi Men 敬底闷, meaning Mountain Top Yao person 山上瑶人
  - Sha Yao 沙瑶 (autonyms: Heiyou Meng 黑尤蒙, Gengwan Men 耿晚闷, meaning Mountain Bottom Yao person 山底瑶人
- Zhuang
- Miao
- Yi
- Dai
- Buyi
- Han

== Languages ==
A dialect of Yue Chinese (Chinese: 河口廣話) is spoken in Hekou County.

== Climate ==
Climate data for Hekou, elevation 138 m (453 ft), (1991–2020 normals, extremes 1991–present)
Month	Jan	Feb	Mar	Apr	May	Jun	Jul	Aug	Sep	Oct	Nov	Dec	Year
Record high °C (°F)	31.6 (88.9)	36.7 (98.1)	37.7 (99.9)	39.7 (103.5)	42.9 (109.2)	40.5 (104.9)	41.0 (105.8)	39.4 (102.9)	38.2 (100.8)	35.6 (96.1)	33.7 (92.7)	31.2 (88.2)	42.9 (109.2)
Mean daily maximum °C (°F)	20.6 (69.1)	22.7 (72.9)	25.9 (78.6)	29.7 (85.5)	32.5 (90.5)	33.6 (92.5)	33.3 (91.9)	33.2 (91.8)	32.2 (90.0)	29.3 (84.7)	26.2 (79.2)	22.2 (72.0)	28.4 (83.2)
Daily mean °C (°F)	16.5 (61.7)	18.3 (64.9)	21.3 (70.3)	24.7 (76.5)	27.3 (81.1)	28.7 (83.7)	28.4 (83.1)	28.0 (82.4)	26.9 (80.4)	24.5 (76.1)	21.0 (69.8)	17.4 (63.3)	23.6 (74.4)
Mean daily minimum °C (°F)	14.2 (57.6)	15.7 (60.3)	18.5 (65.3)	21.5 (70.7)	23.7 (74.7)	25.3 (77.5)	25.3 (77.5)	24.8 (76.6)	23.8 (74.8)	21.7 (71.1)	18.1 (64.6)	14.7 (58.5)	20.6 (69.1)
Record low °C (°F)	3.5 (38.3)	4.5 (40.1)	9.8 (49.6)	11.6 (52.9)	17.0 (62.6)	20.1 (68.2)	21.8 (71.2)	21.4 (70.5)	17.3 (63.1)	13.5 (56.3)	8.6 (47.5)	2.5 (36.5)	2.5 (36.5)
Average precipitation mm (inches)	34.6 (1.36)	32.2 (1.27)	69.2 (2.72)	114.5 (4.51)	180.7 (7.11)	212.3 (8.36)	323.4 (12.73)	362.8 (14.28)	213.5 (8.41)	109.9 (4.33)	49.0 (1.93)	31.9 (1.26)	1,734 (68.27)
Average precipitation days (≥ 0.1 mm)	8.9	9.2	10.7	15.0	17.6	18.5	20.8	19.9	15.4	12.8	7.6	6.2	162.6
Average relative humidity (%)	84	81	80	80	79	81	84	84	84	84	84	84	82
Mean monthly sunshine hours	71.6	77.4	97.1	139.3	173.5	153.5	151.3	168.7	157.1	120.3	118.3	91.6	1,519.7
Percentage possible sunshine	21	24	26	37	42	38	37	43	43	34	36	27	34
Source: China Meteorological Administration Mid August record high

== Industrial Park ==
- Hekou Border Economic Cooperation Zone

First established in 1992, Hekou Border Economic Cooperation Zone is a border zone approved by State Council in China to promote trade between China and Vietnam. It has a planned area of 4.02 square kilometers. The zone implemented several policies to serve its clients in China from various industries and sectors including investment, trade, finance, taxation, immigration, etc.

== Transport ==
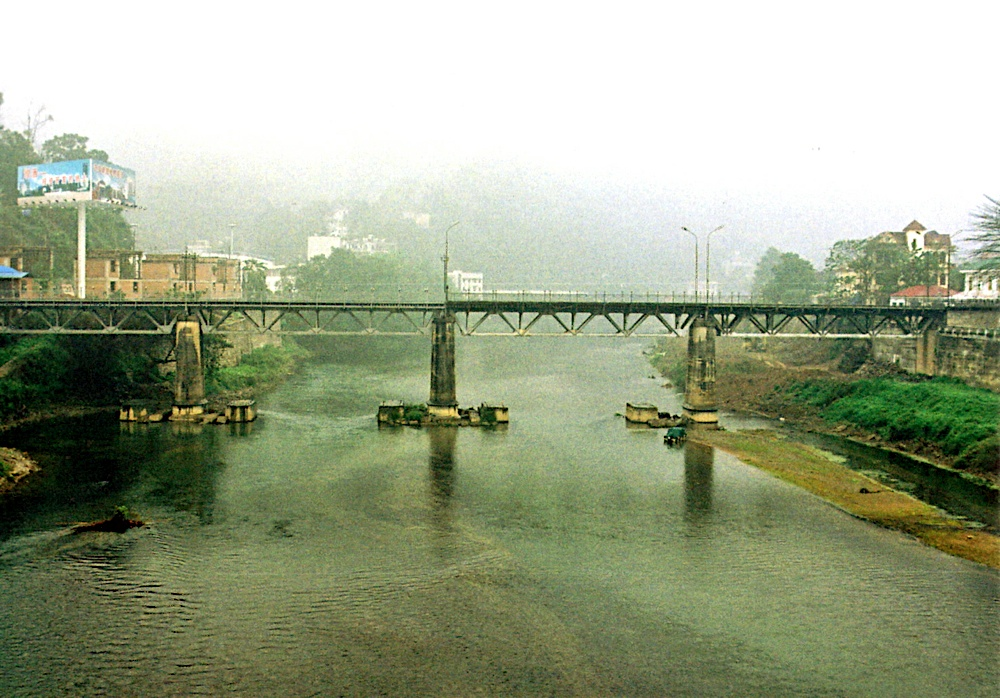
The Hekou–Lào Cai (Hà Khẩu-Lào Cai) bridge

There are bus route to all destinations within Yunnan, including an overnight sleeper service from Kunming. More destinations can be reached by transfer in Mengzi.

=== Highway ===
There is a highway linking Xinjie, a town in Hekou County, with Lào Cai Province in northern Vietnam. It opened in February 2008 and marked the completion of the first highway linking Yunnan with a neighboring country from the Association of Southeast Asian Nations (ASEAN).

The 56.3 kilometer, 3.58 billion yuan Xinhe highway is one of the numerous infrastructure projects that will increase connectivity between Yunnan and ASEAN and facilitate the transport of people and goods between the two regions, which are expecting to see a major increase in tourism and trade in the coming years.

=== Railway ===
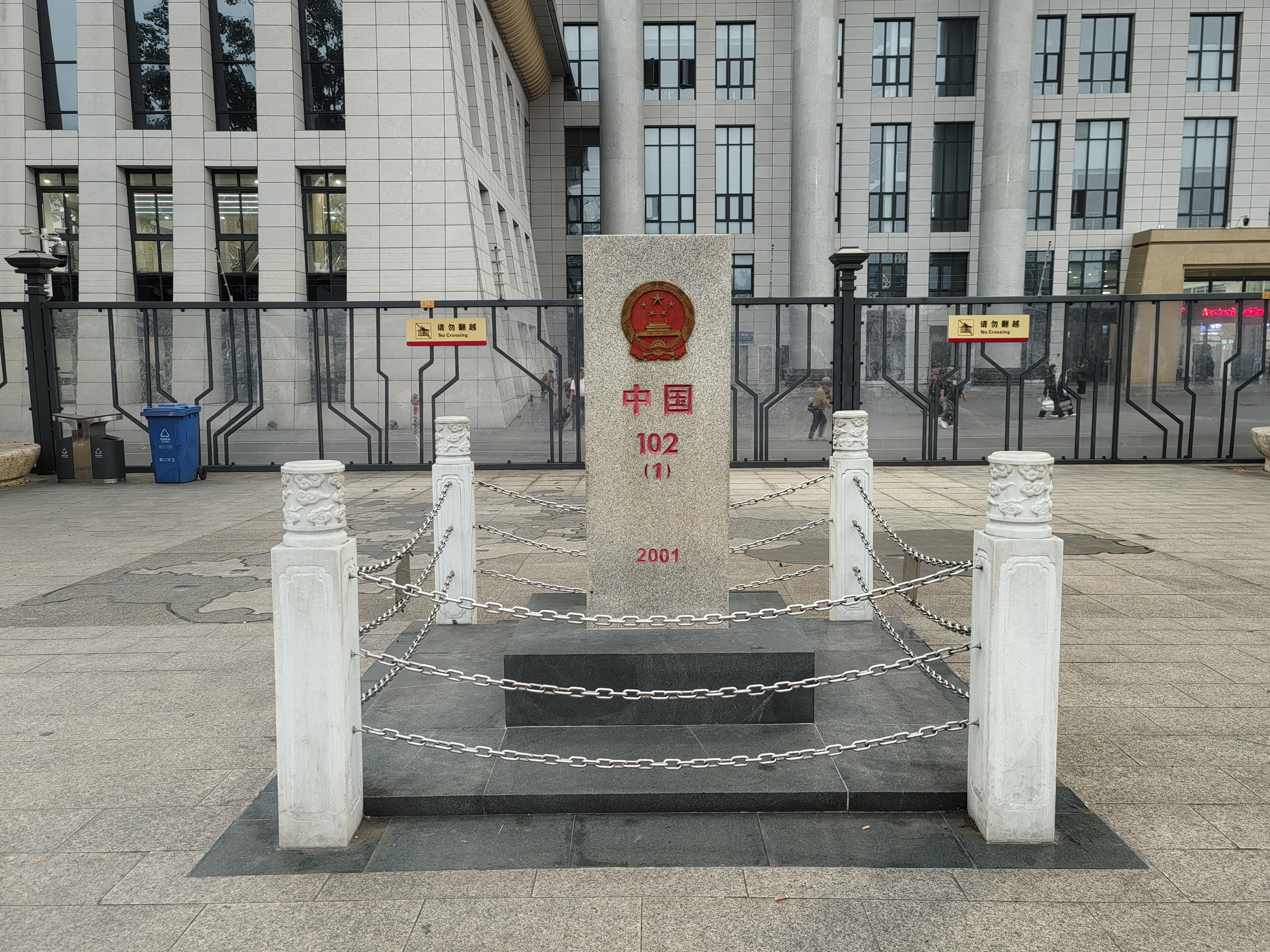
2025 China-Vietnam boundary stone no. 102 (1)

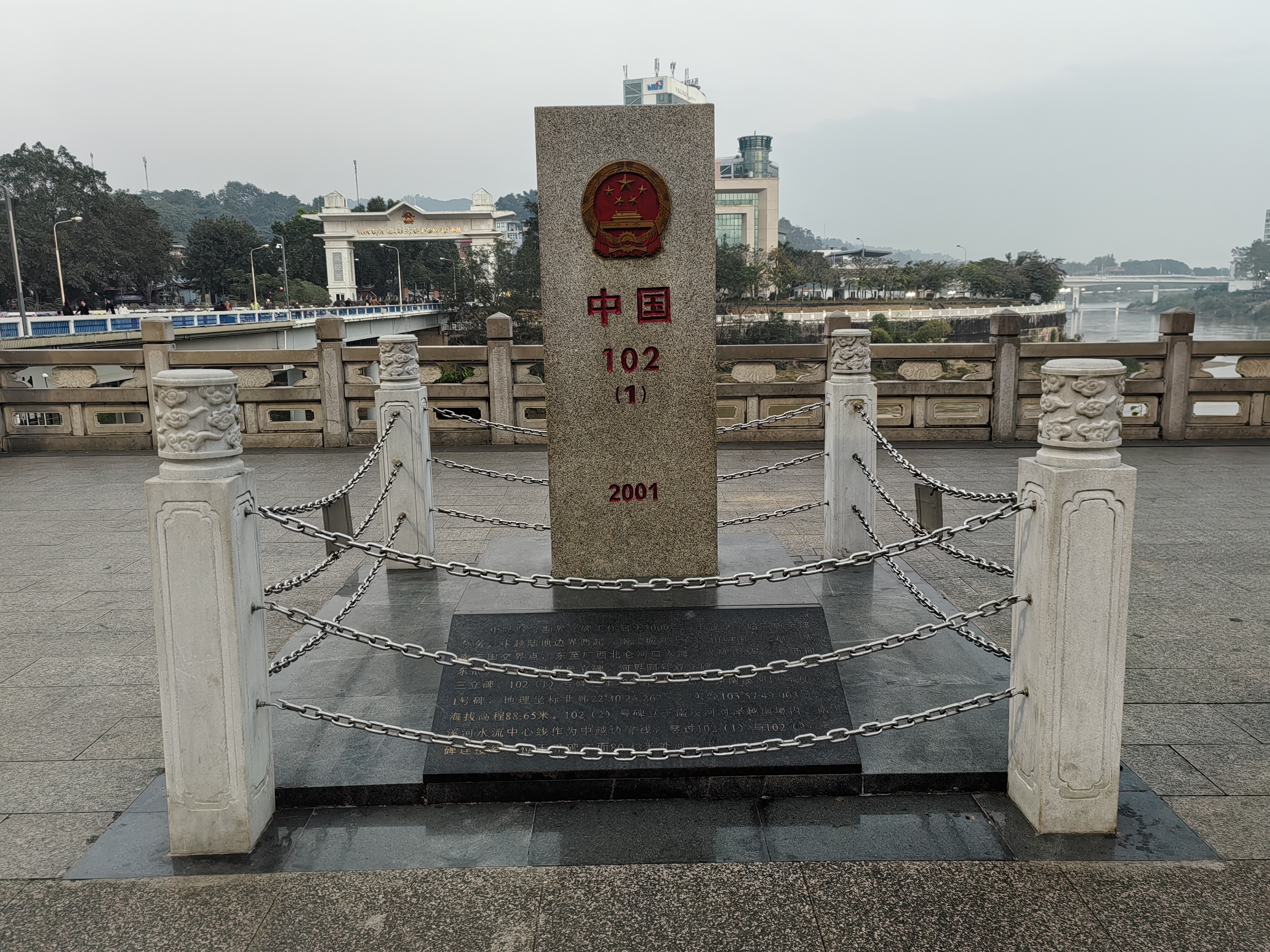
2025 China-Vietnam boundary stone no. 102 (1)

The narrow-gauge Yunnan–Vietnam Railway, connecting Kunming with the port of Haiphong, opened by the French in 1910, crosses the China-Vietnam border in Hekou.

In December 2014, the last section (Mengzi–Hekou) of the new standard-gauge Kunming-Hekou Railway was completed. It ends at the new Hekou North Railway Station, which is also connected by narrow-gauge tracks to the old railway, in order to facilitate cargo movement between China and Vietnam.

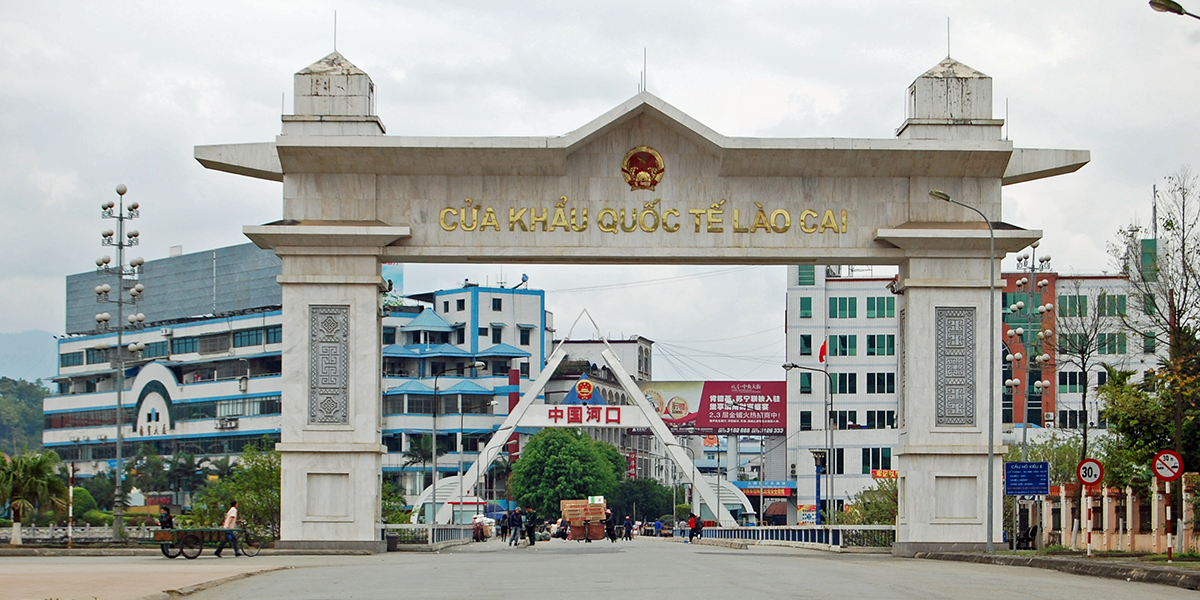
Hekou Border crossing

On 20 February 2025 the Vietnamese parliament approved an $8 billion railroad investment to upgrade under Xi Jinping's Belt and road initiative the old French-built Kunming–Haiphong railway, which serves the Chinese border city Hekou Yao, Lao Cai, Hanoi and Haiphong.
