= Nanxi, Henan =

Nanxi 南席镇
- Town
- Location in Henan
- Coordinates: 34°13′04″N 114°05′50″E
- Country: People's Republic of China
- Province: Henan
- Prefecture-level city: Xuchang
- County-level city: Changge
- Time zone: UTC+8 (China Standard)

Nanxi (Chinese: 南席; pinyin: Nánxí) is a town in Changge, Henan province, China. As of 2020, it has 31 villages under its administration:

- Xijie Village (西街村)
- Hujie Village (胡街村)
- Shuizhai Village (水寨村)
- Yangdian Village (杨店村)
- Mawu Village (马武村)
- Tongzhuang Village (仝庄村)
- Gucheng Village (古城村)
- Guaizizhang Village (拐子张村)
- Zhangzidian Village (张子店村)
- Dawangzhuang Village (大王庄村)
- Yinzhuang Village (尹庄村)
- Matai Village (马台村)
- Lizhuang Village (李庄村)
- Gaomiao Village (高庙村)
- Houzhang Village (侯张村)
- Hezhuang Village (何庄村)
- Shanguo Village (山郭村)
- Taolou Village (套楼村)
- Jiaomenzhuang Village (教门庄村)
- Duzhuang Village (杜庄村)
- Youhan Village (游罕村)
- Fangyu Village (方于村)
- Xixinzhuang Village (西辛庄村)
- Caoniantou Village (曹碾头村)
- Yanzhai Village (阎寨村)
- Jiazhuang Village (贾庄村)
- Weizhuang Village (魏庄村)
- Maozhuang Village (毛庄村)
- Shuiniuchen Village (水牛陈村)
- Beixinzhuang Village (北辛庄村)
- Liuyanzhuang Village (刘彦庄村)

== See also ==
- List of township-level divisions of Henan
