= Nanxi, Yunnan =

Nanxi 南溪镇
- Town
- Location in Yunnan
- Coordinates: 22°37′44″N 103°56′47″E
- Country: People's Republic of China
- Province: Yunnan
- Autonomous prefecture: Honghe Hani and Yi Autonomous Prefecture
- Autonomous county: Hekou Yao Autonomous County
- Time zone: UTC+8 (China Standard)

Nanxi (Chinese: 南溪; pinyin: Nánxī) is a town on the Chinese-Vietnamese border in Hekou Yao Autonomous County, Yunnan province, China. As of 2020, it had seven residential neighborhoods and four villages under its administration.

Neighborhoods

- Mahuangpu Community (蚂蝗堡社区)
- Xiaonanxi Community (小南溪社区)
- Zhennan Community (振南社区)
- Xidong Community (溪东社区)
- Maxike Community (马西克社区)
- Si'erjiu Community (四二九社区)
- Guantang Community (官塘社区)

Villages

- Nanxi Village
- Longpu Village (龙堡村)
- Dananxi Village (大南溪村)
- Anjiahe Village (安家河村)

== See also ==
- List of township-level divisions of Yunnan
