= Xuân Quang =

Coordinates: 22.4106°N 104.2020°E

- Commune
- Interactive map of Xuân Quang
- Country: Vietnam
- Province: Lào Cai
- Time zone: UTC+07:00 (Indochina Time)

Xuân Quang is a commune (xã) in Lào Cai Province, Northwest region of Vietnam. The commune has an area of 43.25 square kilometers and population of 6,933 inhabitants (2006). The commune contains 19 villages (thôn and bản).

On June 16, 2025, the Standing Committee of the National Assembly issued Resolution No. 1680/NQ-UBTVQH15 on the reorganization of commune-level administrative units in Lào Cai Province in 2025. Accordingly, Phong Niên Commune, Trì Quang Commune, and Xuân Quang Commune were merged to form a new commune named Xuân Quang Commune.
