= Phong Thổ district =

Coordinates: 22.500°N 103.417°E

Phong Thổ District Huyện Phong Thổ
- District
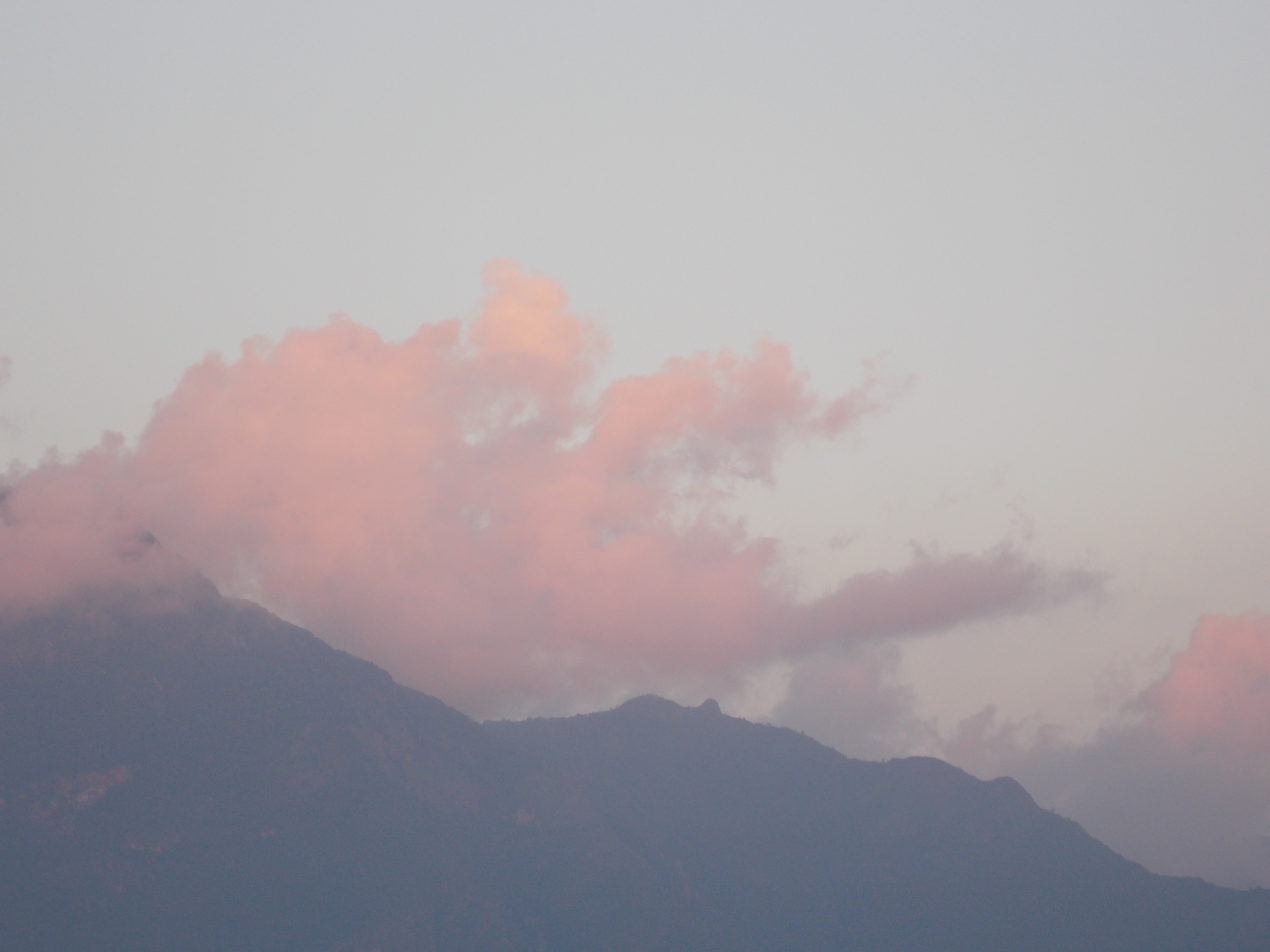
- Landscape of Lản Nhì Thàng on sunset

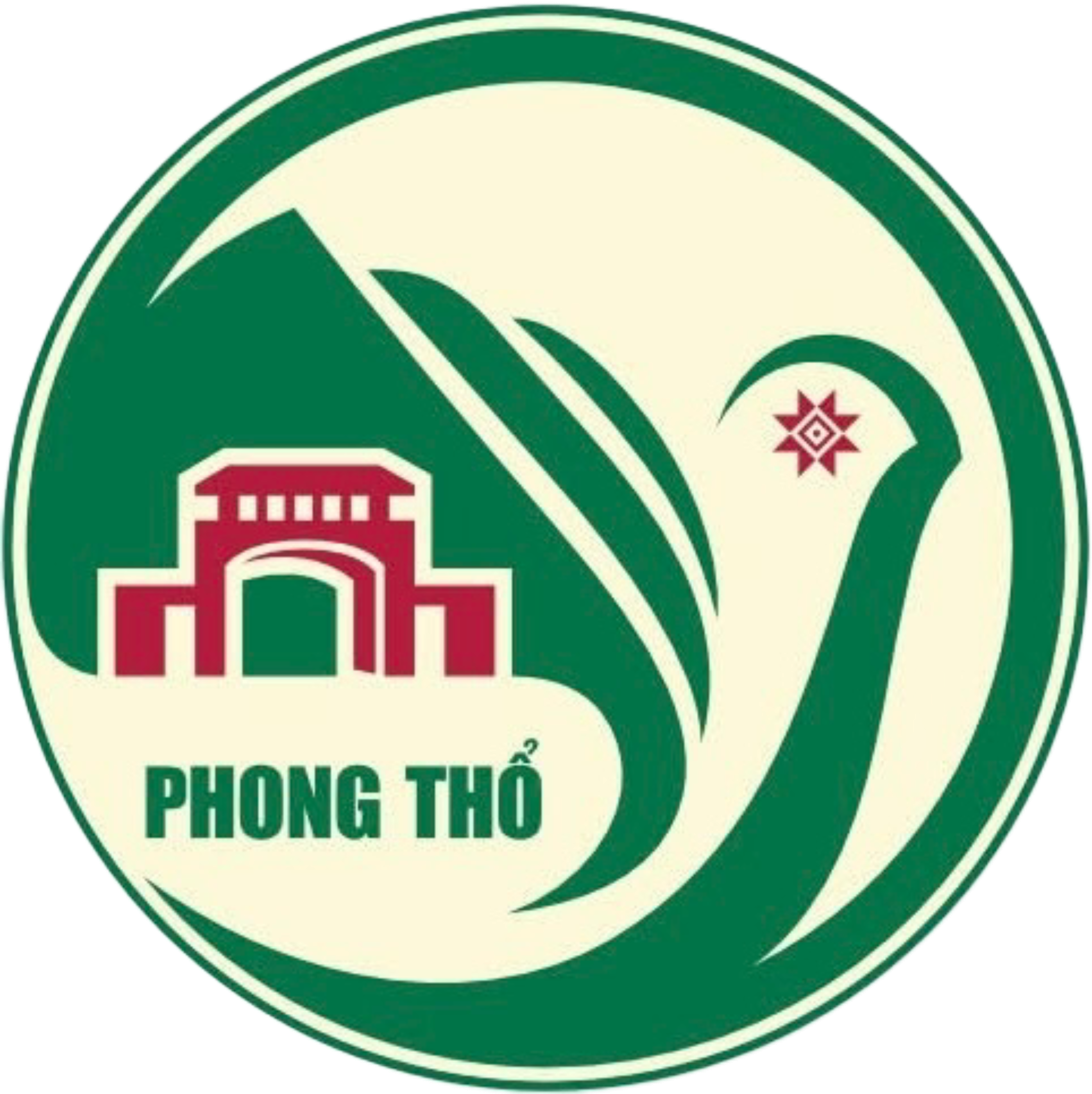
- Seal

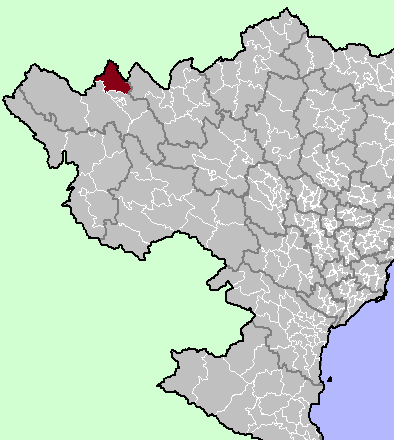
- District location in northern Vietnam
- Country: Vietnam
- Region: Northwest
- Province: Lai Châu
- Capital: Phong Thổ

Area
  - Total: 1,034.60 km^{2} (399.46 sq mi)

Population (2019)
  - Total: 79,645
  - Density: 76.981/km^{2} (199.38/sq mi)
- Time zone: UTC+7 (Indochina Time)

Phong Thổ is a former rural district of Lai Châu province in the Northwest region of Vietnam. As of 2019 the district had a population of 79,645. The district covers an area of 1034.60 km^{2}. The district's capital is Phong Thổ.

== Administrative divisions ==
The district is officially divided into 17 commune-level sub-divisions including the township of Phong Thổ and 16 rural communes (Bản Lang, Dào San, Hoang Thèn, Huổi Luông, Khổng Lào, Lản Nhì Thàng, Ma Li Pho, Mồ Sì San, Mù Sang, Mường So, Nậm Xe, Pa Vây Sử, Sì Lở Lầu, Sin Suối Hồ, Tung Qua Lìn, Vàng Ma Chải).
