= Nanxi, Guangdong =

Nanxi 南溪镇
- Town
- Location in Guangdong
- Coordinates: 23°29′51″N 116°14′37″E
- Country: People's Republic of China
- Province: Guangdong
- Prefecture-level city: Jieyang
- County-level city: Puning
- Time zone: UTC+8 (China Standard)

Nanxi (Chinese: 南溪; pinyin: Nánxī) is a town in Puning, Guangdong province, China. As of 2020, it administers Nanxi Residential Neighborhood and the following 40 villages:

- Nanxi Village
- Yangmei Village (扬美村)
- Xiaweiwang Village (下尾王村)
- Xiaweizhang Village (下尾张村)
- Dianguo Village (典郭村)
- Dianzhan Village (典詹村)
- Yihu Village (沂湖村)
- Yujiao Village (玉滘村)
- Dongyang Village (东洋村)
- Chaowei Village (潮尾村)
- Jinjiao Village (金滘村)
- Dengfeng Village (登峰村)
- Laodou Village (老斗村)
- Xindou Village (新斗村)
- Xinxing Village (新兴村)
- Linshangshu Village (林尚书村)
- Yuzhugang Village (玉竹港村)
- Pingdingqiao Village (平定桥村)
- Sanfu Village (三福村)
- Yushantou Village (玉山头村)
- Pingxue Village (平薛村)
- Pingsu Village (平苏村)
- Zhongtang Village (钟堂村)
- Baoya Village (宝鸭村)
- Xinfang Village (新方村)
- Laofang Village (老方村)
- Xinxi Village (新溪村)
- Dalong Village (大陇村)
- Shilin Village (仕林村)
- Jiaxing Village (加兴村)
- Landou Village (篮兜村)
- Dong First Village (东一村)
- Dong Second Village (东二村)
- Qianzhai Village (前寨村)
- Houzhai Village (后寨村)
- Shishang Village (市上村)
- Chenpan Village (陈畔村)
- Guopan Village (郭畔村)
- Beixi Village (北溪村)
- Xinqiao Village (新桥村)

== See also ==
- List of township-level divisions of Guangdong
