= Bảo Thắng district =

Coordinates: 22°22′56″N 104°10′38″E

Bảo Thắng district Huyện Bảo Thắng
- District
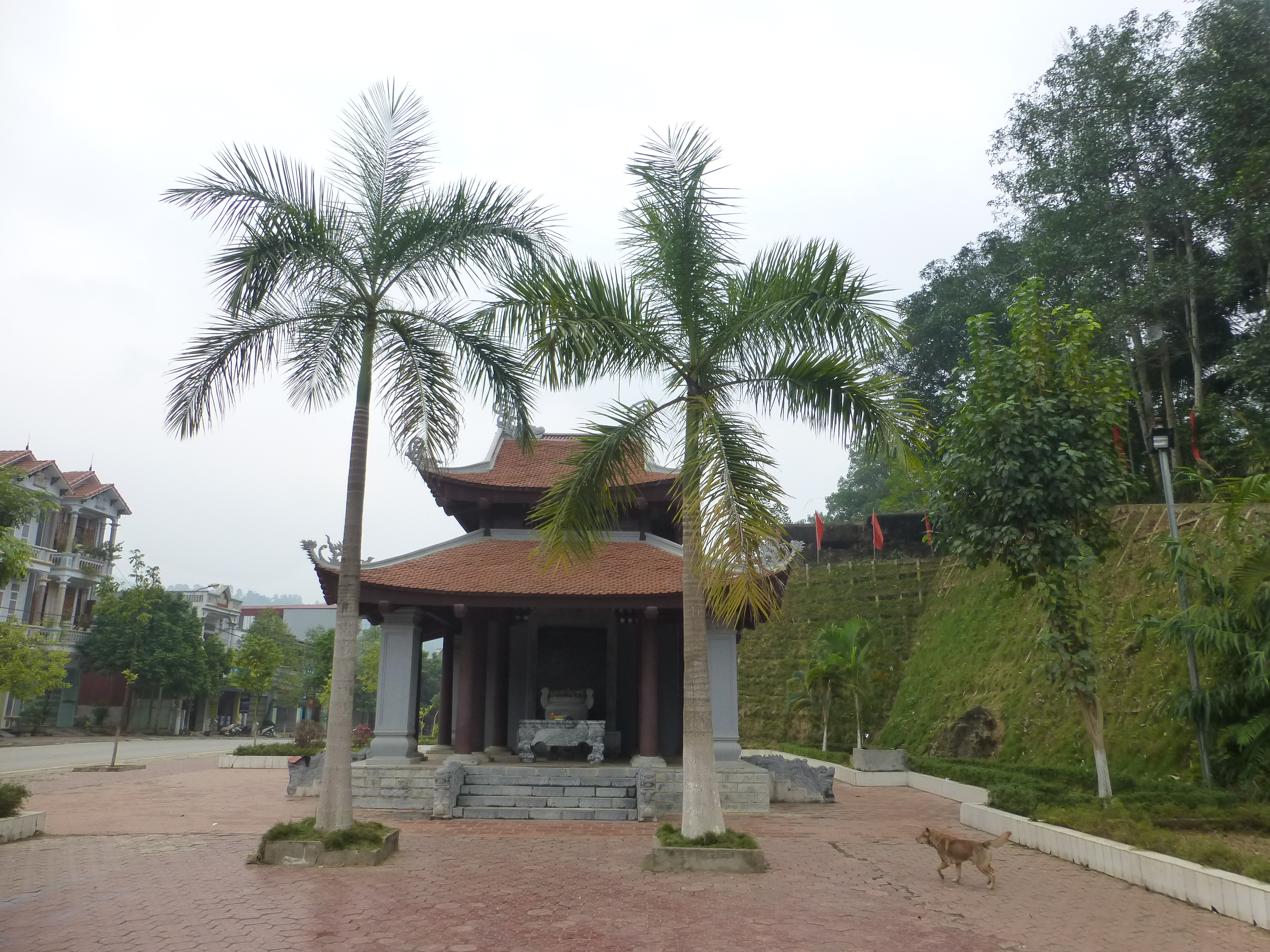
- A monument in Phố Lu

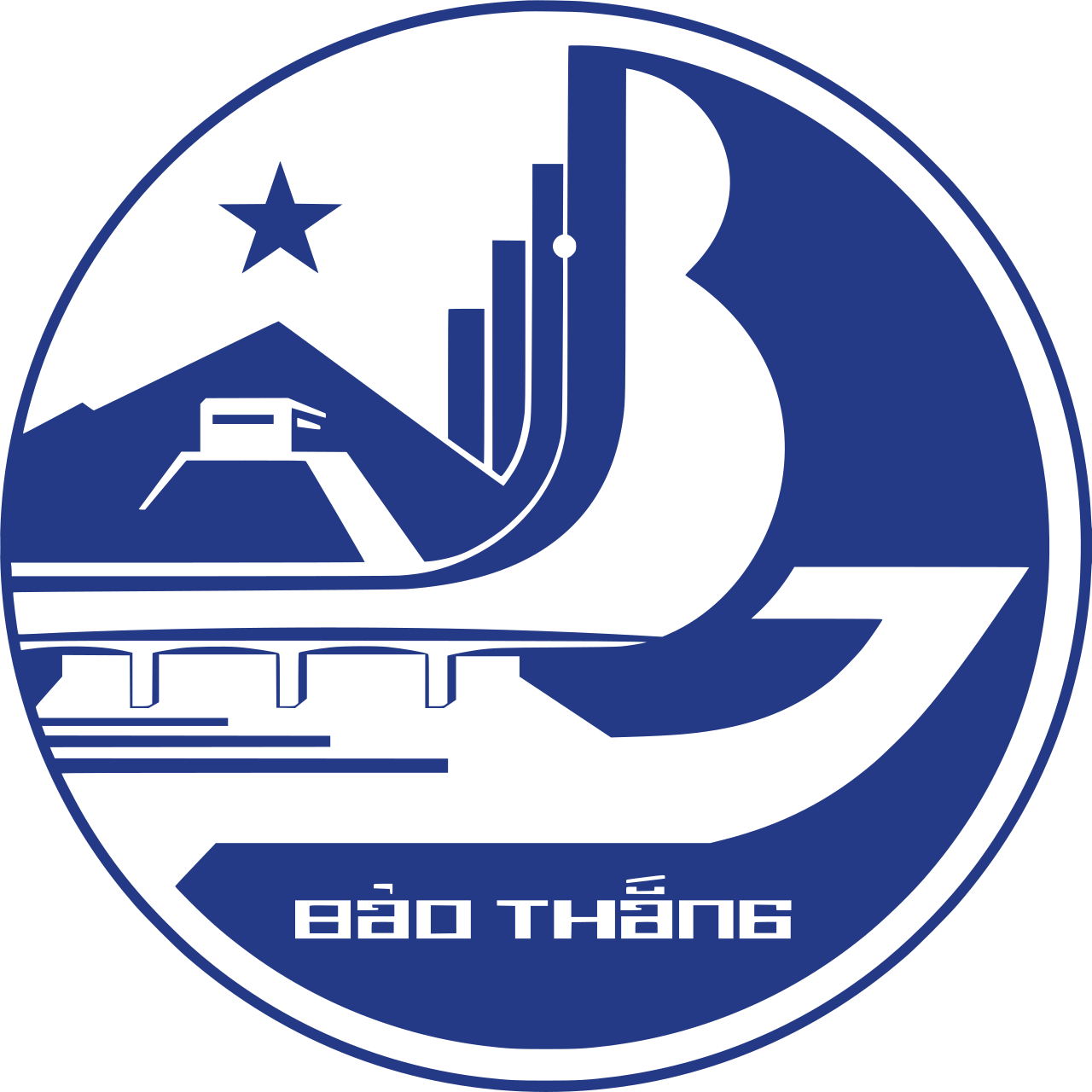
- Seal
- Interactive map of Bảo Thắng district
- Country: Vietnam
- Region: Northeast
- Province: Lào Cai
- Capital: Phố Lu

Area
  - Total: 651.98 km^{2} (251.73 sq mi)

Population (2020)
  - Total: 103,262
  - Density: 158.38/km^{2} (410.21/sq mi)
- Time zone: UTC+07:00 (Indochina Standard Time)

Bảo Thắng is a former rural district (huyện) of Lào Cai province in the Northeast region of Vietnam.

As of 2020, the district had a population of 103,262. The district covers an area of 651.98 km^{2}. The district capital lies at Phố Lu.

== History ==
The administrative unit of Bảo Thắng was first established in 1059 by the Lý dynasty.

== Administrative divisions ==
Bảo Thắng district is subdivided to 14 commune-level subdivisions, including the townships of Phố Lu, Nông trường Phong Hải, Tằng Loỏng and the rural communes of: Bản Cầm, Bản Phiệt, Gia Phú, Phong Niên, Phú Nhuận, Sơn Hà, Sơn Hải, Thái Niên, Trì Quang, Xuân Giao, Xuân Quang.
