= Bát Xát district =

Coordinates: 22.500°N 103.750°E

Bát Xát District Huyện Bát Xát
- District
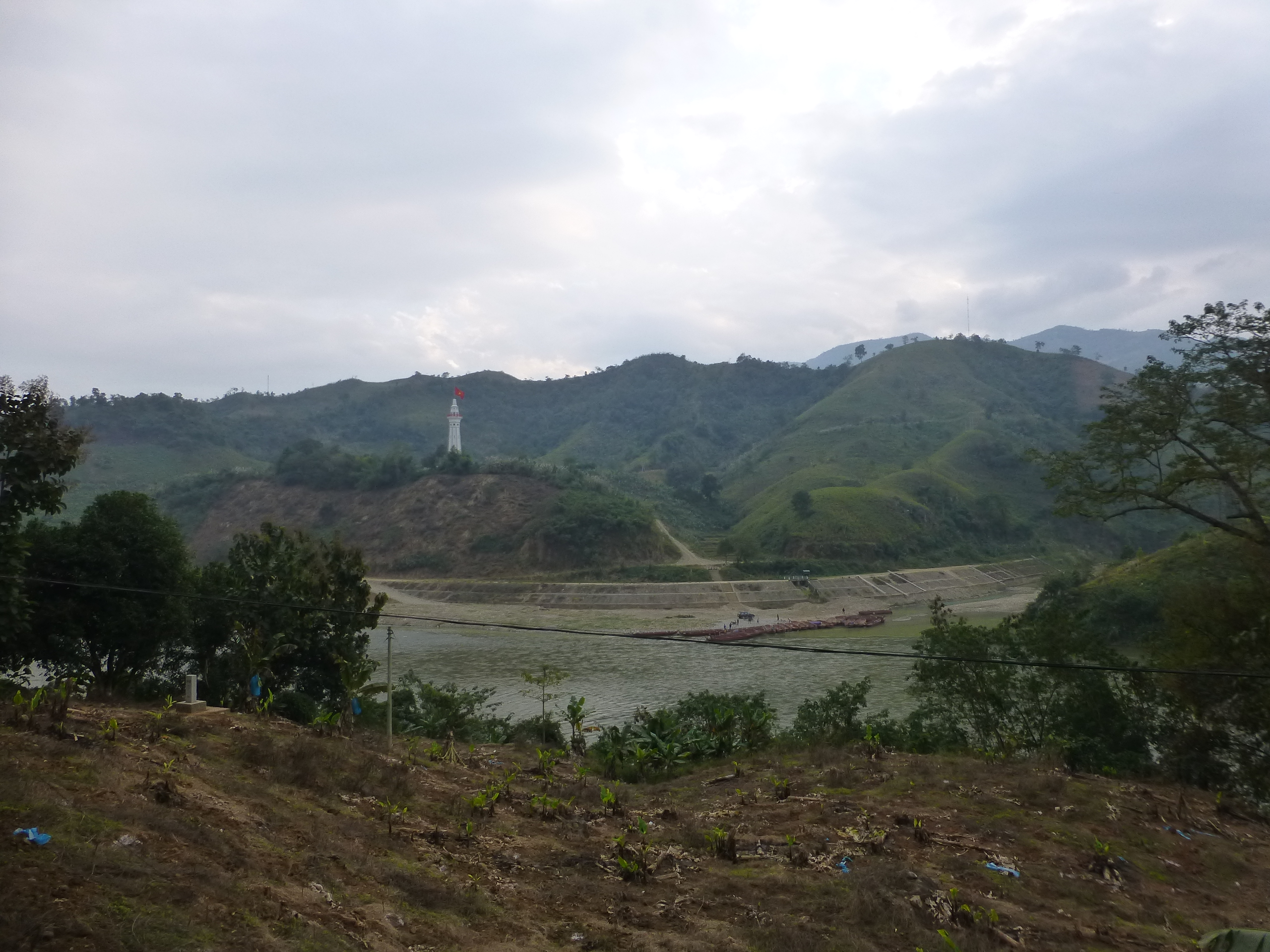
- The confluence of the Red River and the Lonbao River (龙保河) is the northernmost point of Bát Xát District

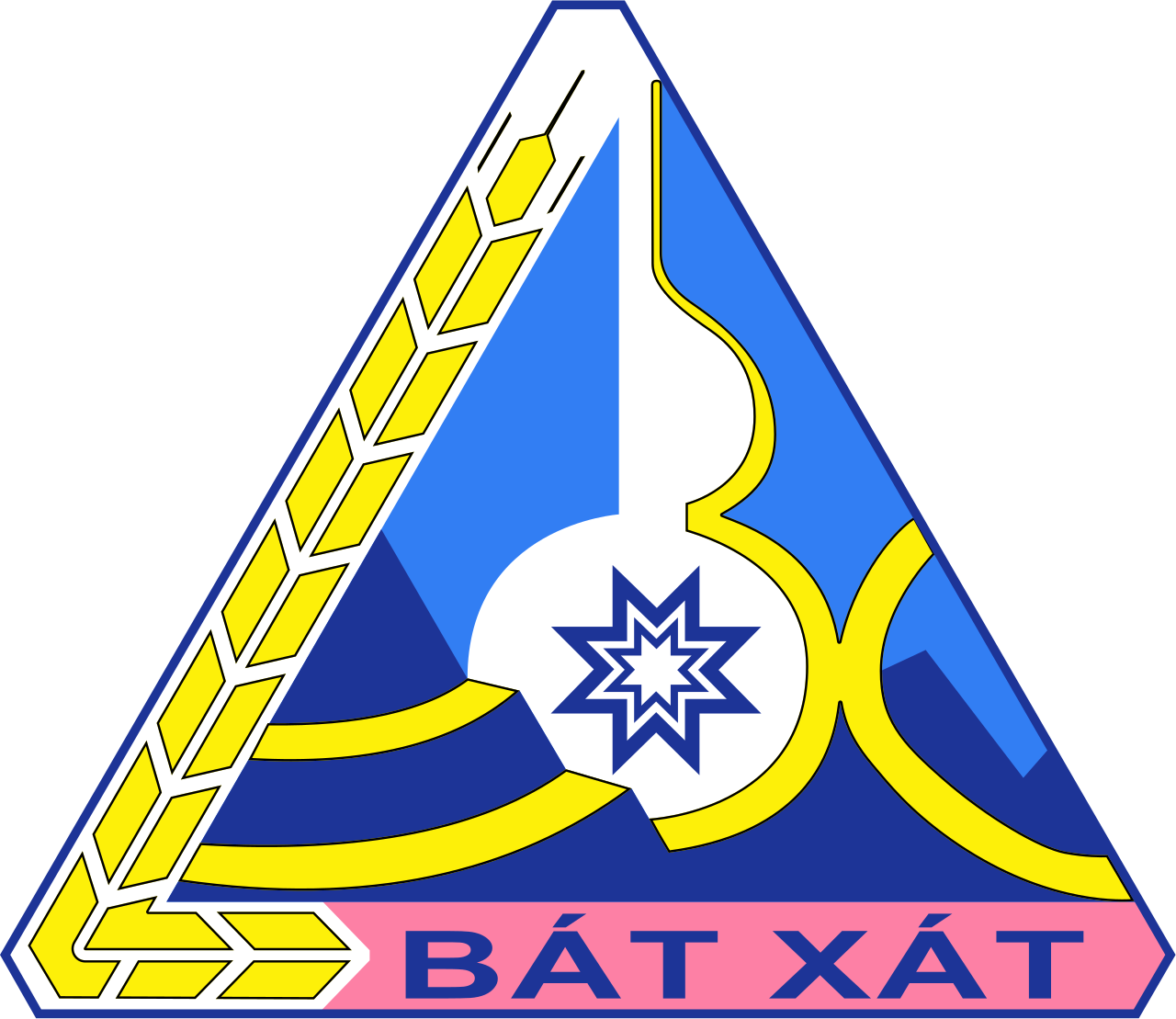
- Seal
- Interactive map of Bát Xát District
- Country: Vietnam
- Region: Northwest
- Province: Lào Cai
- Capital: Bát Xát

Area
  - Total: 410 sq mi (1,050 km^{2})

Population (2003)
  - Total: 62,477
- Time zone: UTC+7 (Indochina Time)

Bát Xát is a rural district of Lào Cai province in the Northwest region of Vietnam. As of 2003, the district had a population of 62,477. The district covers an area of 1,050 km^{2}. The district capital lies at Bát Xát.

== Administrative divisions ==
Bát Xát, Cốc San, Tòng Sanh, Phìn Ngan, Quang Kim, Bản Qua, Mường Vị, Bản Vược, Bản Xèo, Pa Cheo, Nậm Pung, Trung Lènh Hồ, Mường Hum, Dền Thàng, Sáng Ma Sáo, Dền Sáng, Cốc Mỳ, Y Tý, Ngải Thầu, A Lù, A Mú Sung, Nậm Chạc and Trịnh Tường.
