= Nanxi River (Yunnan) =

Tributary of the Red River in China's Yunnan province

Coordinates: 22°30′25″N 103°57′52″E

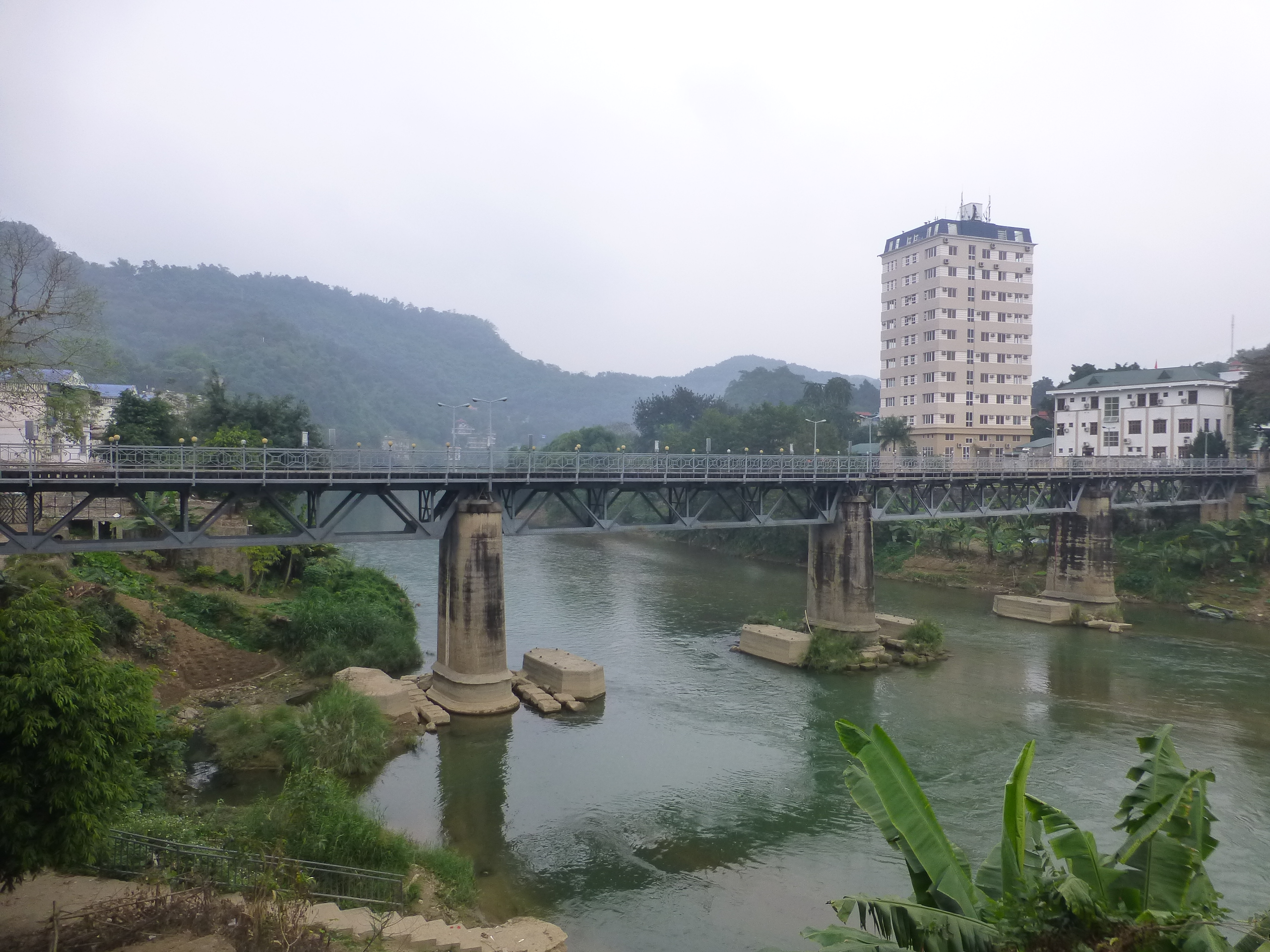
The Yunnan–Vietnam Railway crosses the Nanxi River from Hekou, China (left) to Lao Cai, Vietnam (right) on a bridge a short distance upstream from the river's mouth

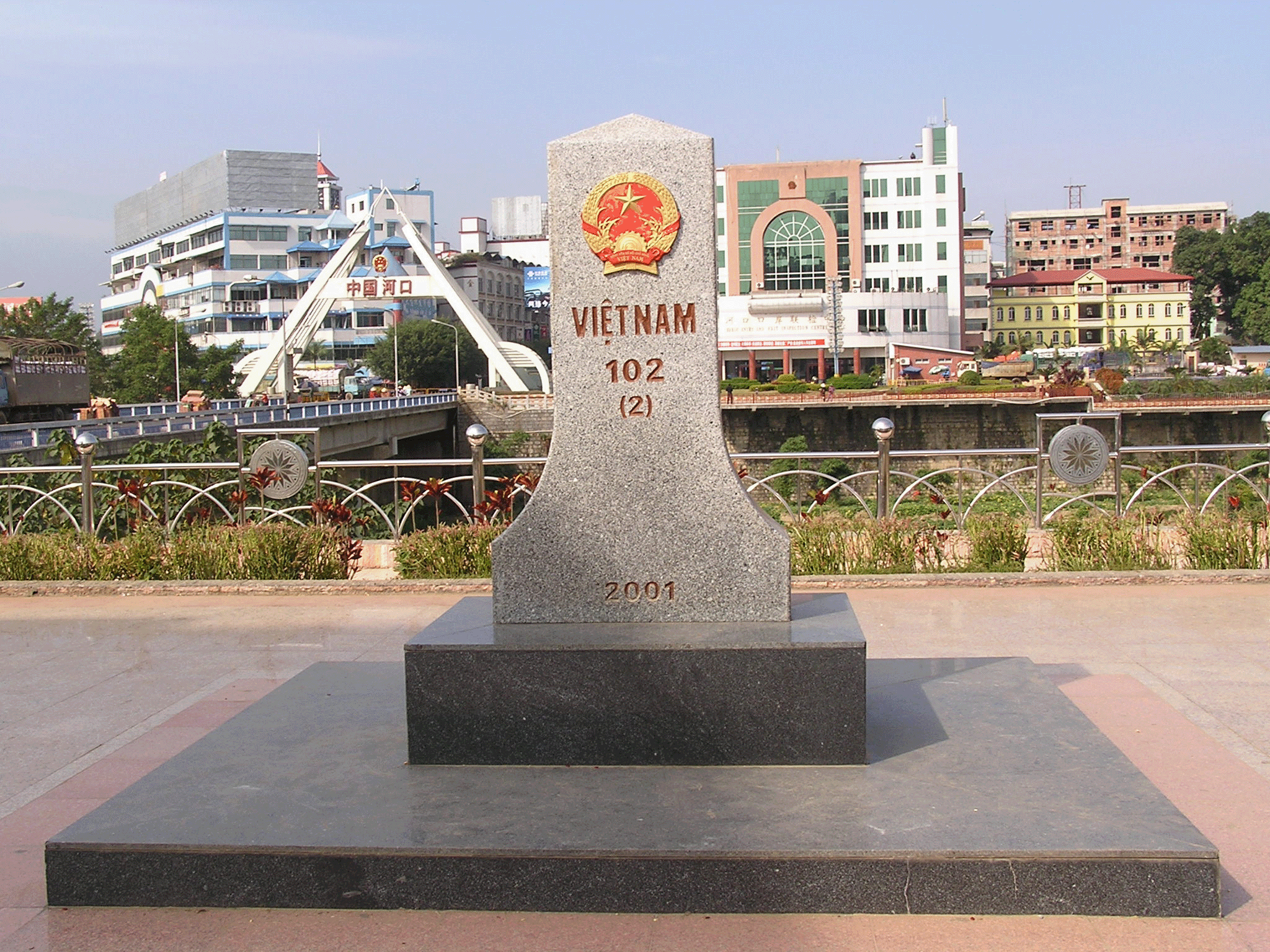
View from the Vietnamese side of the river at the Lao Cai-Hekou border crossing

The Nanxi River (Chinese: 南溪河; pinyin: Nánxī Hé), also known as the Nậm Thi River in Vietnamese or Namiti, is a tributary of the Red River located in China's Yunnan province. It is a border river of Lào Cai, Vietnam, and Hekou, China.

It flows generally north to south from Mengzi to Hekou, where it joins the Red River and flows into Vietnam.

The Chinese portion of the Yunnan–Vietnam Railway was built partly along the Nanxi River valley from 1906 to 1910, linking the city of Kunming with the Vietnamese capital, Hanoi. The mountainous terrain of the Nanxi River Valley posed special difficulties for the railway's construction; this, along with the endemic nature of malaria in the area, led to the deaths of at least 10,000 workers in the valley. Today, the Nanxi River is known as a destination for white water rafting.
