= Quercus langbianensis =

Conservation status
- Near Threatened (IUCN 3.1)

Scientific classification
- Kingdom: Plantae
- Clade: Embryophytes
- Clade: Tracheophytes
- Clade: Spermatophytes
- Clade: Angiosperms
- Clade: Eudicots
- Clade: Rosids
- Order: Fagales
- Family: Fagaceae
- Genus: Quercus
- Subgenus: Quercus subg. Cerris
- Section: Quercus sect. Cyclobalanopsis
- Species: Q. langbianensis

Binomial name
- Quercus langbianensis Hickel & A.Camus 1921

Species of oak tree

Quercus langbianensis is an uncommon oak tree species in the family Fagaceae. It is placed in subgenus Cerris, section Cyclobalanopsis, the ring-cupped oaks. These differ from other Quercus groups in that they have acorns with distinctive cups: usually with substantial rings, made-up of scales that have grown together. This species can be found in sub-tropical and tropical seasonal forests of Vietnam.

== Synonymy ==
A number of species names, previously considered synonyms, are now considered to be valid. These very similar species are considered by Binh, Ngoc et al. (2018) to be a species complex; more information is available in Oaks of the World.

Other species names previously listed here were:

- Quercus baniensis A.Camus - Vietnam
- Quercus blaoensis A.Camus - Vietnam
- Quercus cambodiensis Hickel & A.Camus [synonyms Q. langbianensis subsp. Cambodiensis (Hickel & A.Camus) Menitsky, Q. auricoma A.Camus] - Cambodia
- Quercus camusiae Trel. ex Hickel & A.Camus - Vietnam and China (mostly Yunnan).
- Quercus dilacerata Hickel & A.Camus - Vietnam
- Quercus donnaiensis A.Camus - Vietnam
- Quercus pachyloma Seemen [synonym Cyclobalanopsis pachyloma var. mubianensis (Y.C.Hsu & H.Wei Jen) C.C.Huang] - native to S. China and Taiwan.

== Description ==
Quercus langbianensis is an evergreen tree that reaches a height of up to 15 m. The leaves measure 70-140 (up to 170) x 25–40 mm, elliptical-lanceolate to oblanceolate, leathery and glabrous on both sides, with margins having numerous small teeth that are obtuse, wavy near the apex: which is acuminate to slightly caudate; petioles are 15–20 mm and hairless.

The acorns are sub-globose approximately 17–20 mm, covered with fine silky hair (sericeous), pale brown and ripening by September; scars are approximately 10 mm in diameter and convex. Their styles are persistent about 2 mm in diameter. Superficially, the cups are bowl-shaped, 8 x 20–25 mm approximately, enclosing 1/2 or 2/3 of the acorn. Outside and inside the reddish, tomentose acorn has a wall about 3 mm thick. The bracts are formed by 5 to 7 rings, with whole margins.
