= Bắc Hà =

Bắc Hà may refer to:

- Đàng Ngoài, exonym Tonkin, northern Vietnam during the 17th and 18th centuries
- Bắc Hà District, a rural district of Lào Cai province
  - Bắc Hà (township), the district capital
- Bắc Hà, Hà Tĩnh, a ward of Hà Tĩnh city
- Bac Ha International University

See also

- Hà Bắc
