= Quercus sontraensis =

Conservation status
- Critically Endangered (IUCN 3.1)

Scientific classification
- Kingdom: Plantae
- Clade: Embryophytes
- Clade: Tracheophytes
- Clade: Angiosperms
- Clade: Eudicots
- Clade: Rosids
- Order: Fagales
- Family: Fagaceae
- Genus: Quercus
- Subgenus: Quercus subg. Cerris
- Section: Quercus sect. Cyclobalanopsis
- Species: Q. sontraensis

Binomial name
- Quercus sontraensis Ngoc, H.T.Binh & Son

Species of flowering plants

Quercus sontraensis is a species of oak. It is a tree endemic to Vietnam. It is an evergreen tree which grows up 12 metres tall. It flowers from January to March, and acorns were collected in September and October.

The species was discovered in Son Tra Nature Reserve on the Sơn Trà Peninsula in Da Nang City in Central Vietnam. It grows in evergreen forest from 340 m to 430 m elevation.

The species was described by Nguyen Van Ngoc, Hoang Thi Binh, and Hoang Thanh Son in 2022. It is morphologically and phylogenically most closely related to Quercus cambodiensis and Q. langbianensis.
