= Quercus conduplicans =

Conservation status
- Data Deficient (IUCN 3.1)

Scientific classification
- Kingdom: Plantae
- Clade: Embryophytes
- Clade: Tracheophytes
- Clade: Spermatophytes
- Clade: Angiosperms
- Clade: Eudicots
- Clade: Rosids
- Order: Fagales
- Family: Fagaceae
- Genus: Quercus
- Subgenus: Quercus subg. Cerris
- Section: Quercus sect. Cyclobalanopsis
- Species: Q. conduplicans

Binomial name
- Quercus conduplicans Chun

Species of flowering plant

Quercus conduplicans is a species of oak. It is a tree endemic to Guangdong Province of southern China.

The species was described by Woon Young Chun in 1947. Some consider it a synonym of Quercus pachyloma.
