= Neoserica laocaiana =

Scientific classification
- Kingdom: Animalia
- Phylum: Arthropoda
- Class: Insecta
- Order: Coleoptera
- Suborder: Polyphaga
- Infraorder: Scarabaeiformia
- Family: Scarabaeidae
- Genus: Neoserica
- Species: N. laocaiana

Binomial name
- Neoserica laocaiana Ahrens, Fabrizi & Liu, 2014

Species of beetle

Neoserica laocaiana is a species of beetle of the family Scarabaeidae. It is found in Vietnam.

== Description ==
Adults reach a length of about 8.2–8.3 mm. They have a light reddish brown, oblong body. The antennae are yellow and the dorsal surface is dull and nearly glabrous, except for a few long erect setae on the elytra.

== Etymology ==
The species is named according its occurrence in Lào Cai province.
