= Na Tum mine =

- Location: Lào Cai Province, Vietnam
- Products: Lead, Zinc

The Na Tum mine is one of the largest lead and zinc mines in Vietnam. The mine is located in northern Vietnam in Lào Cai Province. The mine has reserves amounting to 12 million tonnes of ore grading 5% lead and 10% zinc.
