= Bảo Thắng =

- Commune
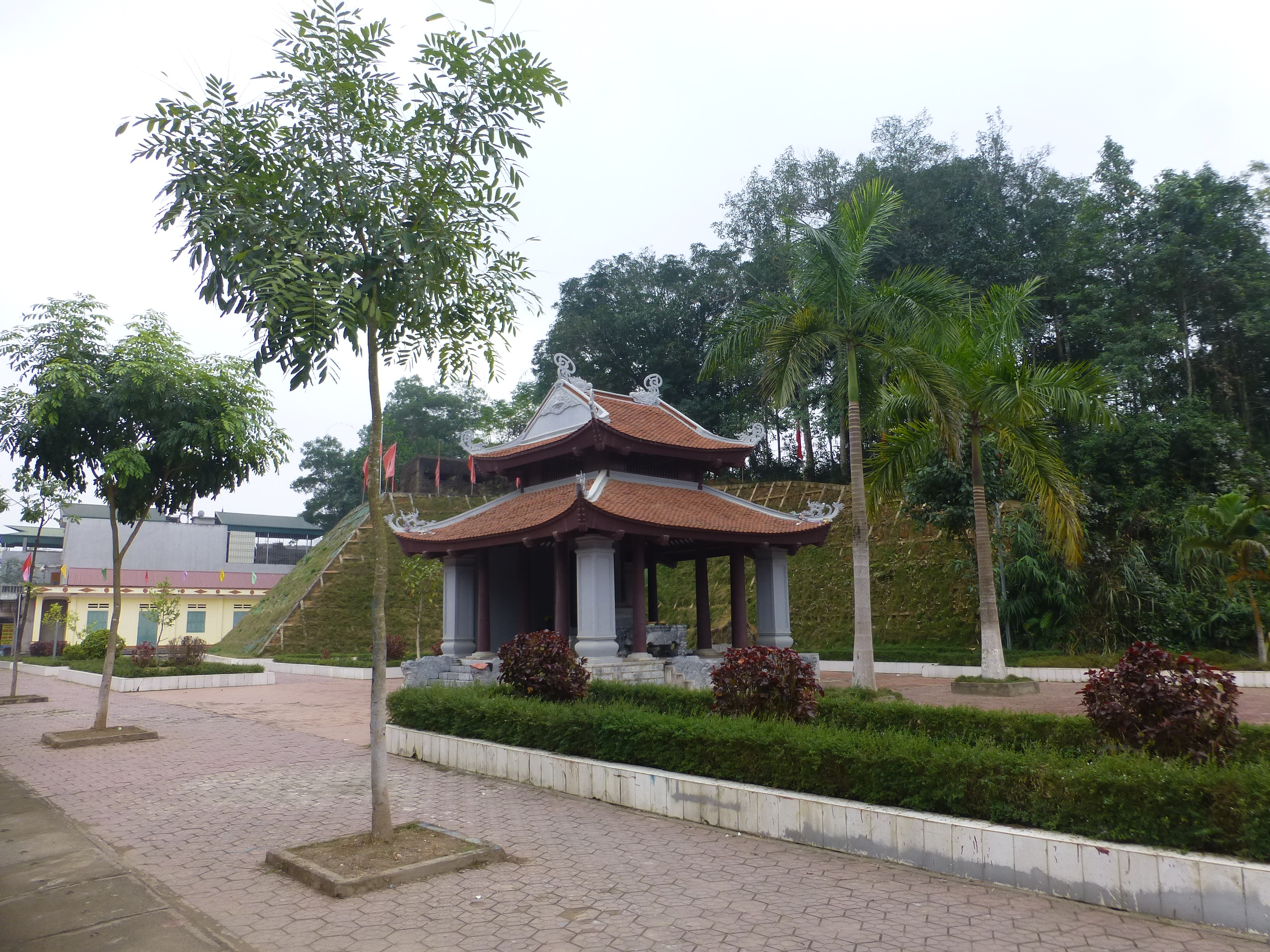
- Phố Lu Fort historical site
- Interactive map of Bảo Thắng
- Coordinates: 22°22′56″N 104°10′38″E
- Country: Vietnam
- Province: Lào Cai
- Region: Northwest
- Established: 16 June 2025

Area
  - Total: 160.44 km^{2} (61.95 sq mi)

Population (2025)
  - Total: 32,800
  - Density: 204/km^{2} (530/sq mi)
- Website: baothang.laocai.gov.vn

Bảo Thắng is a commune in Lào Cai province, Vietnam.

On 16 June 2025:

- The National Assembly of Vietnam adopted Resolution No. 203/2025/QH15 amending and supplementing several articles of the Constitution of the Socialist Republic of Vietnam. Under the resolution, district-level administrative units nationwide ceased to operate from 1 July 2025.
- The Standing Committee of the National Assembly of Vietnam issued Resolution No. 1673/NQ-UBTVQH15 on the reorganization of commune-level administrative units in Lào Cai province in 2025, which took effect on 16 June 2025. Under the resolution, the entire area and population of Phố Lu township and the former communes of Sơn Hà, Sơn Hải, and Thái Niên were consolidated to form a new commune named Bảo Thắng.
