= Quercus blaoensis =

Conservation status
- Critically Endangered (IUCN 3.1)

Scientific classification
- Kingdom: Plantae
- Clade: Embryophytes
- Clade: Tracheophytes
- Clade: Spermatophytes
- Clade: Angiosperms
- Clade: Eudicots
- Clade: Rosids
- Order: Fagales
- Family: Fagaceae
- Genus: Quercus
- Subgenus: Quercus subg. Cerris
- Section: Quercus sect. Cyclobalanopsis
- Species: Q. blaoensis

Binomial name
- Quercus blaoensis A.Camus

Species of oak tree

Quercus blaoensis is the accepted name of a critically endangered oak tree species. It is estimated that there are fewer than 50 mature individuals. This species belongs the Asian sub-genus of Quercus within the family Fagaceae. It differs from other Quercus subgenera in that they have acorns with distinctive cups, characterised by growing rings of scaly protrusions and densely grouped acorns (applies to this species but not to all). This species is endemic to southeastern Vietnam where it inhabits evergreen seasonal tropical forests at altitudes of 200–1100 metres. It is named after 'Blao', the name used by the Chau Ma minority people for Bảo Lộc.

== Description ==
Quercus blaoensis is an evergreen tree that typically grows to a height of 15 metres. It is similar to Quercus langbianensis which some authors consider to be a species complex. The leaves of Quercus blaoensis measure 80–120 × 28–35 mm and are lanceolate in shape, with an attenuate base and a pointed apex. In adulthood, the leaves are glabrous on both sides, having a smooth, green upper surface and a whitish, slightly waxy underside. The leaf margin is not wavy and is toothed for the apical third. The petiole measures 9–18 mm in length and is initially yellowish-pilose, becoming bare over time. The catkins of the tree are 15 mm long and bear 2–3 flowers. The acorns are ovate, 18 × 17 mm, and are densely hairy, with a depressed apex. The calyx, measuring 18–20 mm in diameter, covers two-thirds of the nut and typically features eight scaley rings.
