= Quercus donnaiensis =

Conservation status
- Critically Endangered (IUCN 3.1)

Scientific classification
- Kingdom: Plantae
- Clade: Embryophytes
- Clade: Tracheophytes
- Clade: Spermatophytes
- Clade: Angiosperms
- Clade: Eudicots
- Clade: Rosids
- Order: Fagales
- Family: Fagaceae
- Genus: Quercus
- Subgenus: Quercus subg. Cerris
- Section: Quercus sect. Cyclobalanopsis
- Species: Q. donnaiensis

Binomial name
- Quercus donnaiensis A.Camus

Species of oak tree

Quercus donnaiensis is a critically endangered species of oak trees, endemic to central Vietnam. This species belongs the Asian sub-genus of Quercus within the family Fagaceae: which have acorns with distinctive cups, characterised by growing rings of scaly protrusions; it was considered a synonym of Quercus langbianensis, but now included by Binh, Ngoc et al. (2018) in the "Q. langbianensis complex".

Its habitat is broadleaf evergreen montane forest, with the original description locating "Province du Haut-Donnaï; 1000-1700 m", so the species name almost certainly relates to the French spelling for the upper Đồng Nai river region rather than the modern province.

== Description ==
The original description states that the tree grows to 25 m and a distinguishing feature of Quercus donnaiensis is the yellow/golden tomentum covering the whole young tree: including young twigs, which later become glabrous and dark brown.

The leaves are 100-160 x 40-50 mm, oval-lanceolate in shape, with a few peripheral teeth in upper 1/3; they are densely tomentose at first, becoming hairless, but with a persistent tomentum along midrib. this is nearly flat above, prominent beneath, with 9-14 pairs of secondary veins, at an angle of 60° from midrib; tertiary veins are not visible. The petiole is tomentose and 10-20 mm long.

Female catkins are 25 mm long, with 5-6 flowers on a tomentose rachis; there are typically 4 styles with stigmas that are thick and dark. The acorns are 15-17 mm long x 12 mm wide, loosely pubescent and rounded at tip. They are in groups of 4 to 5 on a 70-80 mm rachis and take 2 years to mature. The cupule is half-round and 15 mm in diameter, with 5-6 concentric scaley rings, enclosing 1/2 of the nut.
