= Quercus camusiae =

Conservation status
- Critically Endangered (IUCN 3.1)

Scientific classification
- Kingdom: Plantae
- Clade: Embryophytes
- Clade: Tracheophytes
- Clade: Spermatophytes
- Clade: Angiosperms
- Clade: Eudicots
- Clade: Rosids
- Order: Fagales
- Family: Fagaceae
- Genus: Quercus
- Subgenus: Quercus subg. Cerris
- Section: Quercus sect. Cyclobalanopsis
- Species: Q. camusiae

Binomial name
- Quercus camusiae Trel. ex Hickel & A.Camus 1930

Synonyms
- Cyclobalanopsis camusiae (Trel. ex Hickel & A. Camus) Y.C. Hsu & H.Wei Jen; Cyclobalanopsis faadoouensis Hu; Quercus geminata Hickel & A.Camus [heterotypic]

Species of oak tree

Quercus camusiae is an uncommon species of tree in the family Fagaceae. It has been found in Vietnam and southern China (Yunnan).

== Description ==
Quercus camusiae is similar to Quercus langbianensis which some authors consider to be a species complex. It is a tree up to 15 m. tall, with rough bark with spots; leaves are as much as 170 mm long. The branches and twigs are brown and tomentose when young, less hairy with age. The acorn is subglobose, approx. 17 mm, pale brown, covered with fine silky hair (sericeous); scar approx. 10 mm in diameter.
