= Sơn Trà Mountain =

Mountain in Vietnam

Son Tra Mountain
- Monkey Mountain
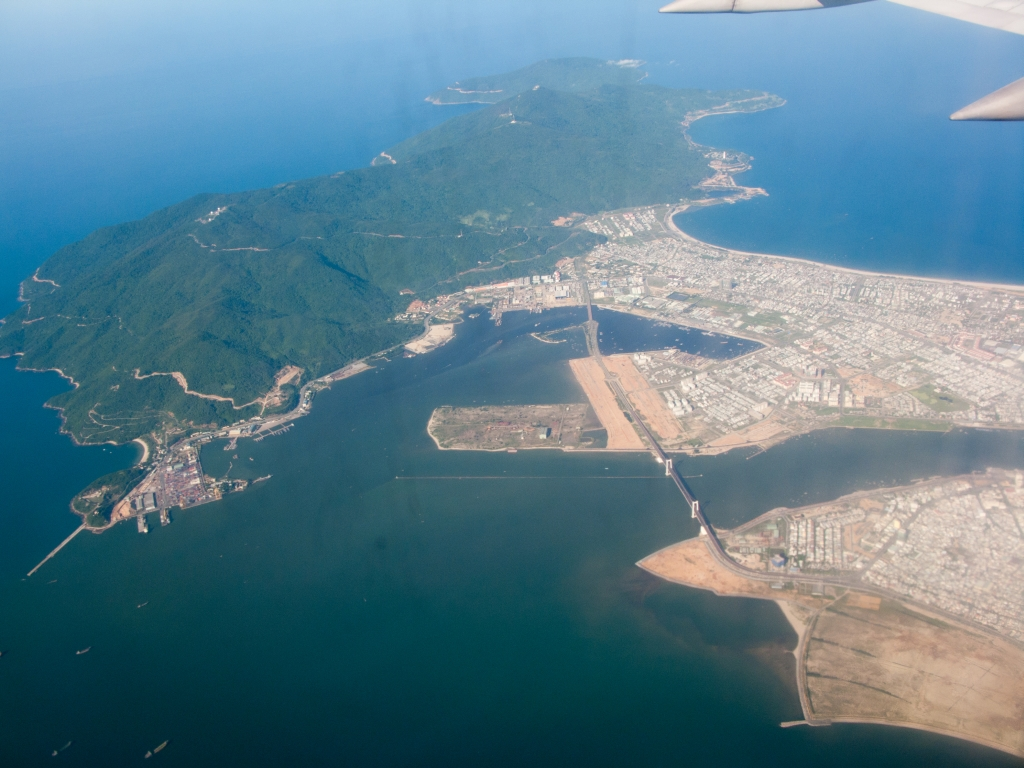
- Aerial view of Son Tra Mountain.

Highest point
- Elevation: 670 m (2,200 ft)
- Coordinates: 16°07′11″N 108°17′12″E

Geography
- Location within Vietnam
- Location: Da Nang, Vietnam

Sơn Trà Mountain (Vietnamese: Núi Sơn Trà), also known as Monkey Mountain, is a mountain and peninsula range located on Sơn Trà Peninsula, in Sơn Trà district, Đà Nẵng, Vietnam, overlooking the Bay of Da Nang and the East Sea. Đà Nẵng Port's Tiên Sa Terminal is located at the base of the mountain's western face, as is nearby Tiên Sa Beach.

The site is notable as a natural reserve and tourism location to the nearby city. The site is a habitat for many endangered species notably the Red-shanked douc langur, with over 60% of the species located on the mountain range. In 1977 the site was designated a nationally protected forest following the takeover of the site by the newly unified government. The mountain and peninsula were designated a nature reserve in 1992, covering an area of 25.91 km^{2}. Quercus sontraensis, a critically endangered oak species, is endemic to the peninsula. Currently, the site is undergoing significant and in many cases illegal development, with plots of land illegally being transferred to developers by local governments for constructing hotels and venues.

== Y Pha Nho Cemetery ==
Located on Yet Kieu Road, just before Tien Sa port gates. It is a collective graveyard for French and Spanish soldiers who died in the Franco-Spanish expedition under the command of Admiral Charles Rigault de Genouilly in the first failed attempt to conquer Tourane (Da Nang now) from 1858 to 1860.

The cemetery consists of a small white chapel, with a modest shrine inside and 32 large and unlabeled small sized graves. Inscribed inside the chapel there is a commemorative plaque with the following inscription:

"A la Mémoire des combattants Français et Espagnols de l'Expédition Rigault de Genouilly Morts en 1858-59-60 et ensevelis en ces lieux R.I.P.”.

"To the memory of French and Spanish soldiers of the expedition of Rigault de Genouilly Died in 1858-59-60 and buried here R.I.P."

The cemetery was inaugurated in 1898.

== Linh Ung Pagoda ==
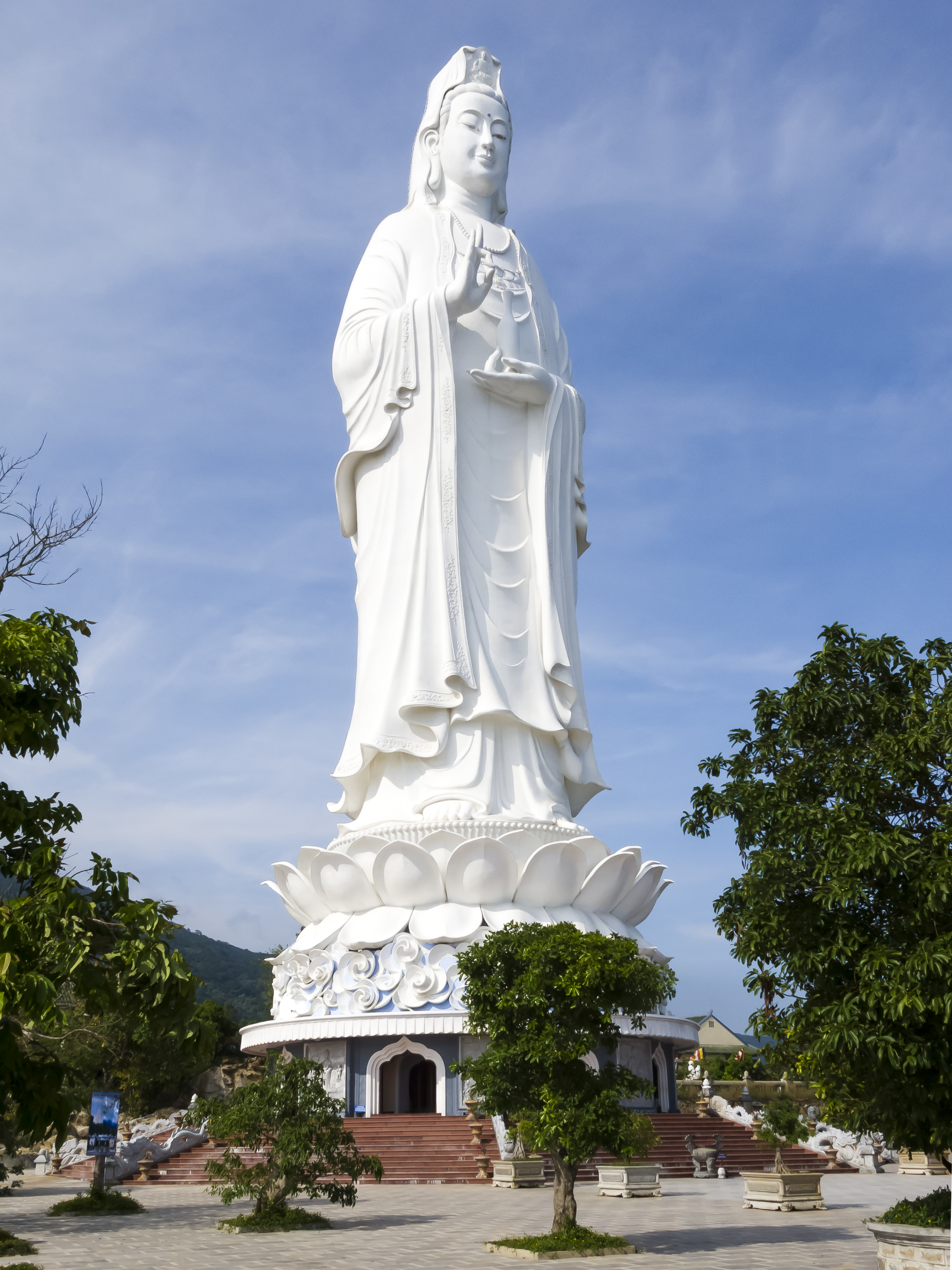
Quan Am statue at Linh Ung Pagoda

Linh Ung Pagoda is located in an area known locally as Bai But or Buddha's Sanctuary towards Hoang Sa road. It is the largest pagoda in Central Vietnam.

The Quan Am statue (also known as Lady Buddha; сhinese: Guanyin; sanskrit: Avalokiteśvara) inside Linh Ung Pagoda courtyard stands 67 metres tall, making it the tallest statue in Vietnam at the time of its completion in 2010. It can virtually be seen from every corner of Da Nang, becoming an attractive tourist site of the city.

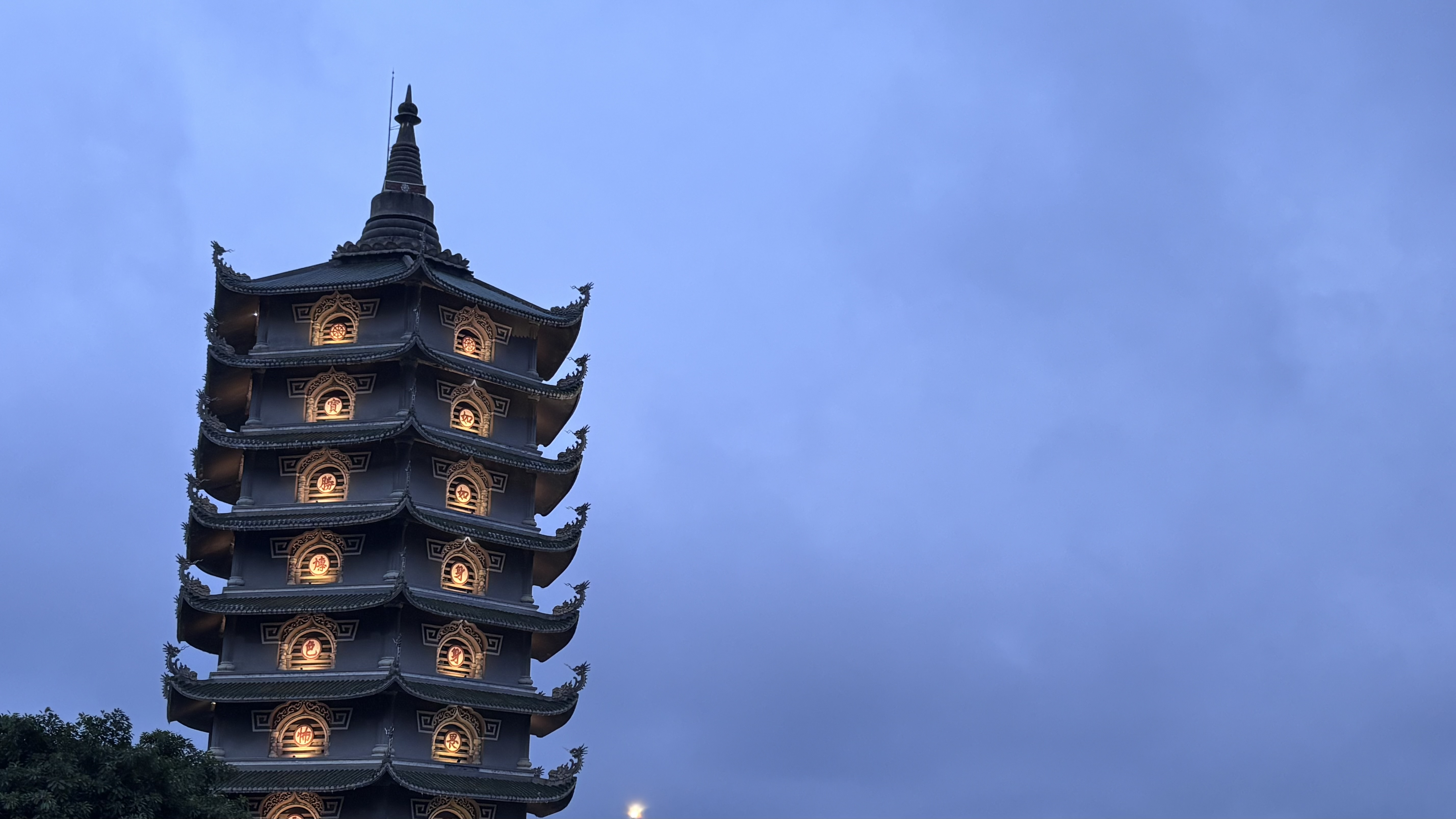
Linh Ung Pagoda on Son Tra mountain

== Ban Co Peak ==
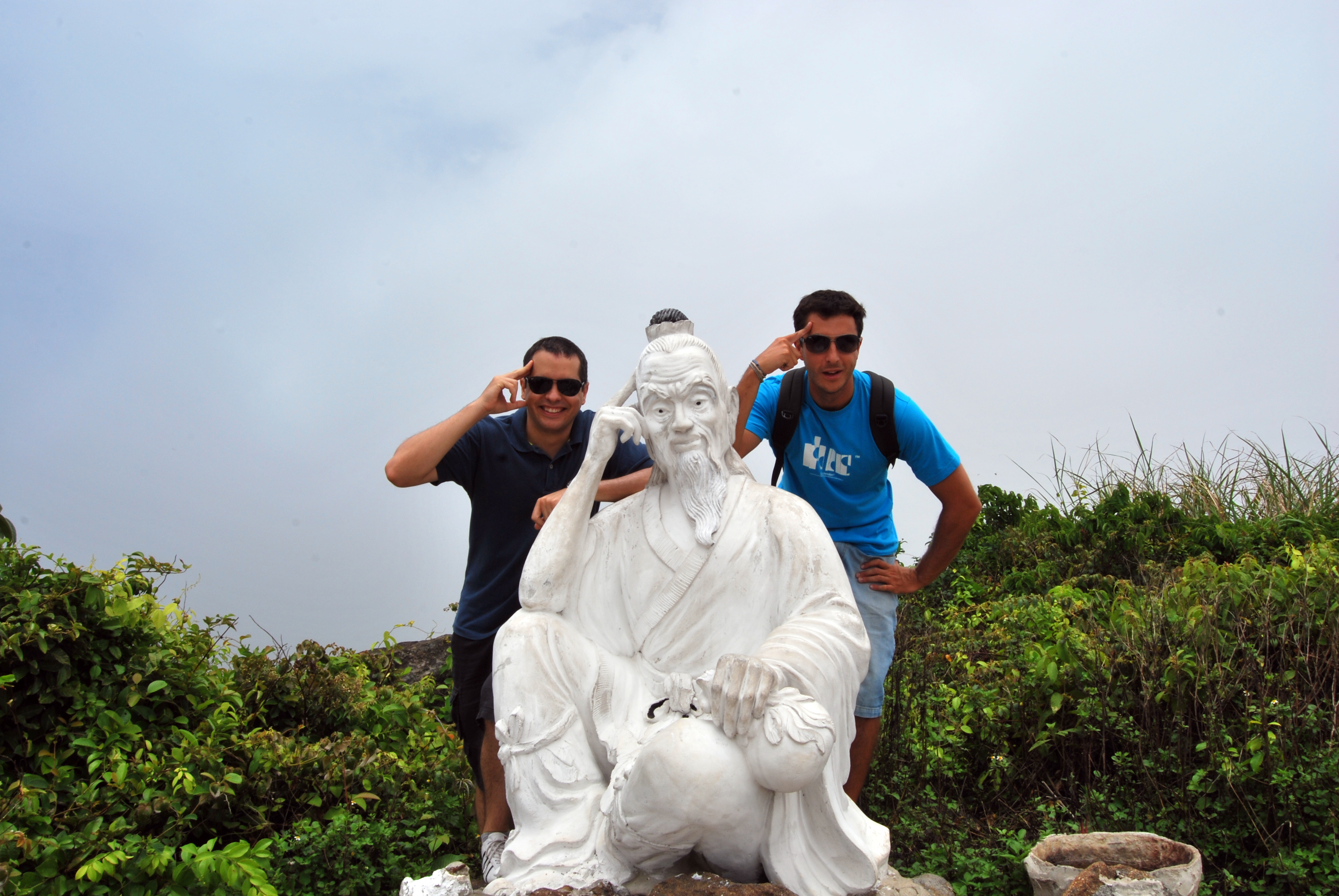
Chessboard statue in Ban Co peak

Ban Co (Chessboard in English) peak is the highest mountain in Son Tra peninsula, standing at nearly 600 m above sea level. From Ban Co peak, visitors can enjoy spectacular panoramic views over the entire Da Nang city, Hai Van pass, Lien Chieu bay, Ba Na Hills, Cham islands and the sea far away.

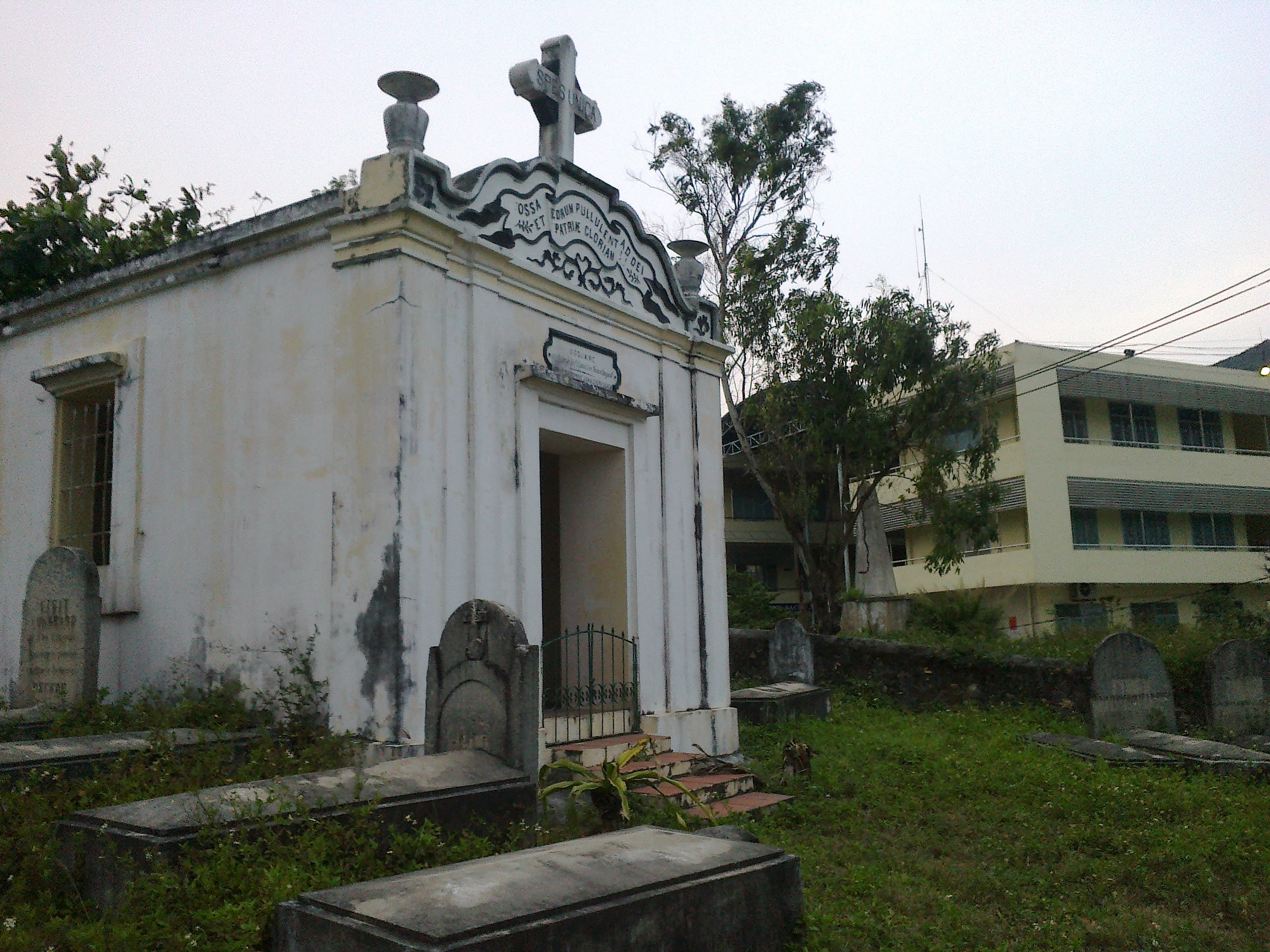
Chapel Y Pha Nho cemetery

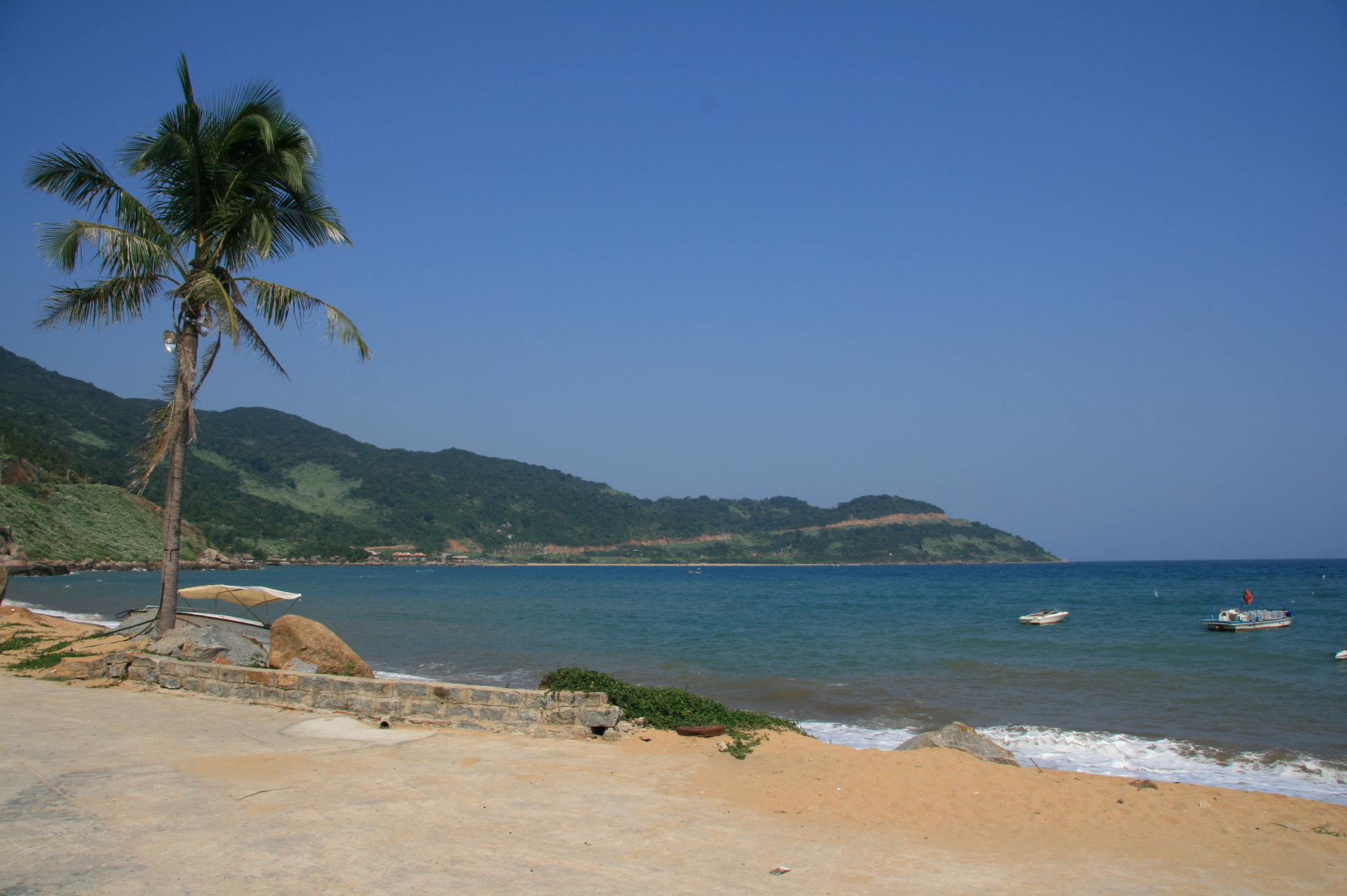
Son Tra Peninsula South East area. Hoang Sa road section

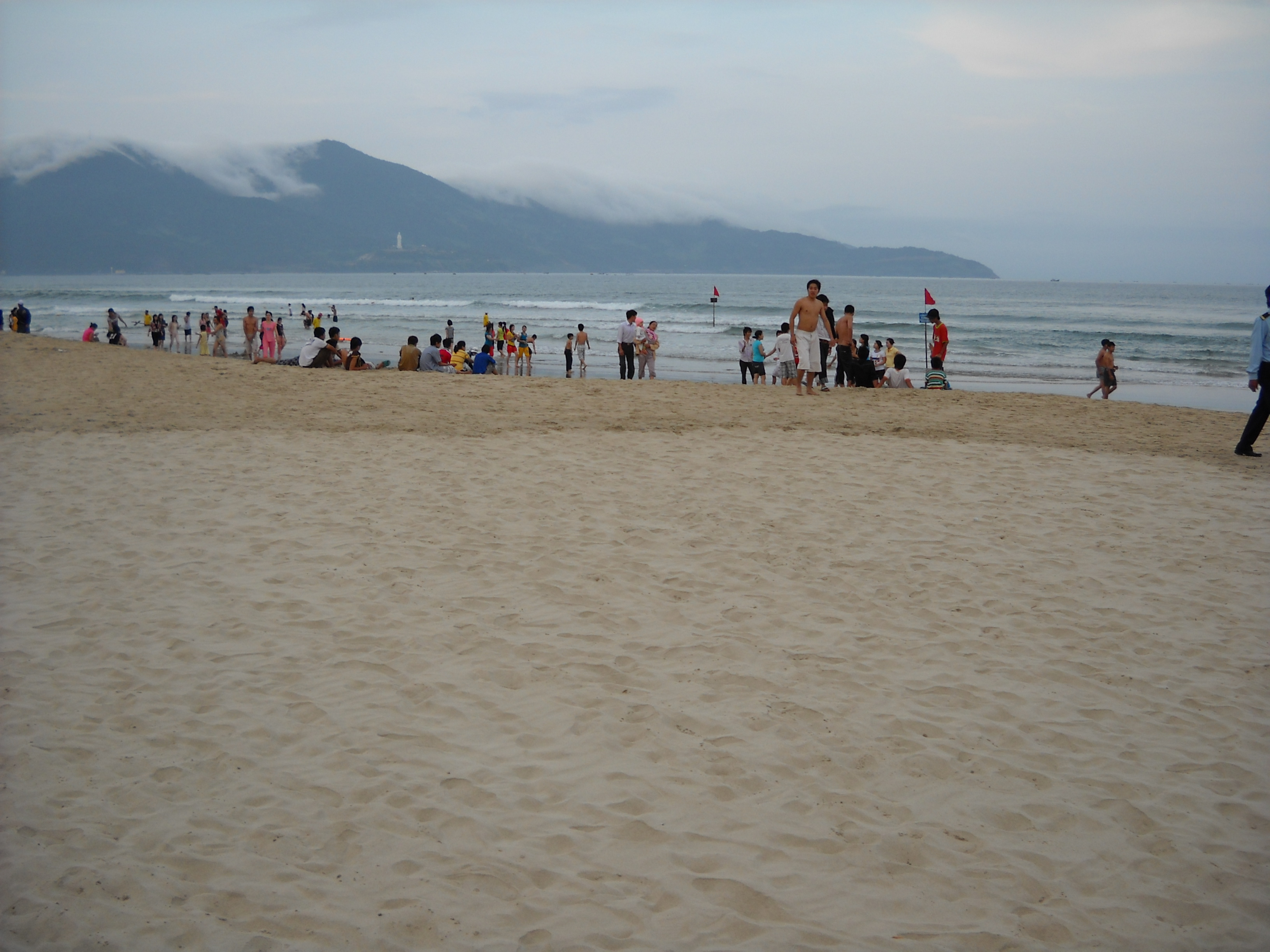
Son Tra Peninsula, overlooking My Khe Beach, Da Nang

== Historical US Military Usage ==
Monkey Mountain Facility, a U.S. military communications facility during the Vietnam War was located on the mountain, while another base Camp Tien Sha is now part of the Tiên Sa Terminal. Due to its proximity to Da Nang Air Base/International Airport and Marble Mountain Air Facility, the mountain was the scene of several aircraft crashes during the Vietnam War:

- 11 December 1964: A Republic of Vietnam Air Force C-123B (#55-4522) crashed into the mountain shortly after takeoff from Da Nang Air Base killing all 38 on board.
- 26 October 1965: two F-4B Phantoms of VMFA-115 returning to Da Nang Air Base from a mission crashed into the side of the mountain killing all four crewmembers.
- 19 February 1968: a CH-53A #65-055 of HMH-463 crashed into the mountain killing all 13 personnel on board.
- 24 March 1968: an F-8 Crusader Bu 150306 from VF-53 crashed into the side of the mountain, the pilot ejected successfully and the rear fuselage of the jet which embedded in the mountain became a popular photo opportunity for military personnel.
