= Quercus dilacerata =

Conservation status
- Critically Endangered (IUCN 3.1)

Scientific classification
- Kingdom: Plantae
- Clade: Embryophytes
- Clade: Tracheophytes
- Clade: Spermatophytes
- Clade: Angiosperms
- Clade: Eudicots
- Clade: Rosids
- Order: Fagales
- Family: Fagaceae
- Genus: Quercus
- Subgenus: Quercus subg. Cerris
- Section: Quercus sect. Cyclobalanopsis
- Species: Q. dilacerata

Binomial name
- Quercus dilacerata Hickel & A.Camus

Species of flowering plant

Quercus dilacerata is a species of oak. It is a tree endemic to northern Vietnam. It is known only from Lào Cai province, where it grows in montane rain forest at approximately 1,800 metres elevation.

The species was described by Paul Robert Hickel and Aimée Antoinette Camus in 1929.
