= Bắc Hà, Lào Cai =

Bắc Hà Xã Bắc Hà
- Commune
- Bắc Hà commune
- Location within Vietnam
- Coordinates: 22°32′16″N 104°17′25″E
- Country: Vietnam
- Region: Northwest
- Province: Lào Cai
- Time zone: UTC+7 (UTC + 7)

Bắc Hà is a commune (xã) and capital of Lào Cai Province, Vietnam.
