= Bac Ha International University =

Vietnamese higher educational institution

- Type: Private
- Established: 2007
- Location: Tien Du District, Bắc Ninh Province, Vietnam
- Campus: Urban/Suburb
- Website: https://iubh.edu.vn/

Bac Ha International University (Vietnamese: Đại học Quốc tế Bắc Hà) is a private university north-east of Hanoi, Vietnam. Bac Ha International University BHIU was established under the Prime Minister's Decision no. 1369/QD-TTg dated October 10, 2007, with the mandate of training human resources in the fields of Information Technology, Telecommunication–Electronics Engineering, Banking and Finance, Accounting.
