= Quercus baniensis =

Conservation status
- Critically Endangered (IUCN 3.1)

Scientific classification
- Kingdom: Plantae
- Clade: Embryophytes
- Clade: Tracheophytes
- Clade: Spermatophytes
- Clade: Angiosperms
- Clade: Eudicots
- Clade: Rosids
- Order: Fagales
- Family: Fagaceae
- Genus: Quercus
- Subgenus: Quercus subg. Cerris
- Section: Quercus sect. Cyclobalanopsis
- Species: Q. baniensis

Binomial name
- Quercus baniensis A.Camus

Species of flowering plant

Quercus baniensis is a species of oak. It is a tree endemic to central Vietnam. It is known only from Da Nang Municipality, where it grows at the edges of submontane evergreen rain forest from 707 to 789 metres elevation. The species has a limited range, and an estimated population of fewer than 50 individuals. The IUCN Red List assesses the species as Critically Endangered.

The species was described by Aimée Antoinette Camus in 1936.
