= Quercus cambodiensis =

Conservation status
- Critically Endangered (IUCN 3.1)

Scientific classification
- Kingdom: Plantae
- Clade: Embryophytes
- Clade: Tracheophytes
- Clade: Spermatophytes
- Clade: Angiosperms
- Clade: Eudicots
- Clade: Rosids
- Order: Fagales
- Family: Fagaceae
- Genus: Quercus
- Subgenus: Quercus subg. Cerris
- Section: Quercus sect. Cyclobalanopsis
- Species: Q. cambodiensis

Binomial name
- Quercus cambodiensis Hickel & A.Camus

Synonyms
- Quercus langbianensis subsp. cambodiensis (Hickel & A.Camus) Menitsky

Species of oak tree

Quercus cambodiensis is an Asian tree species in the family Fagaceae, endemic to Cambodia. It is placed in section Cyclobalanopsis (the ring-cupped oaks).
