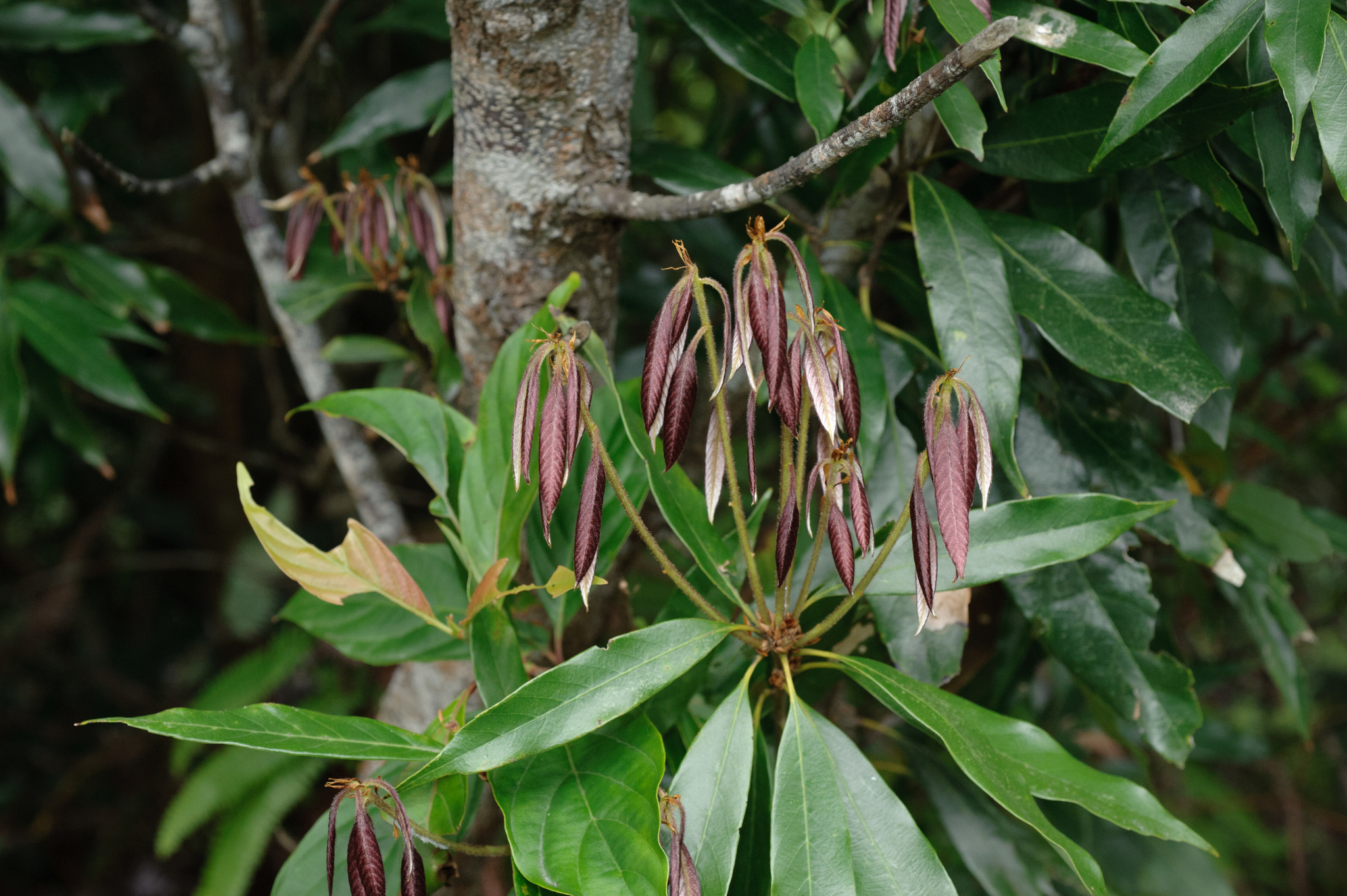

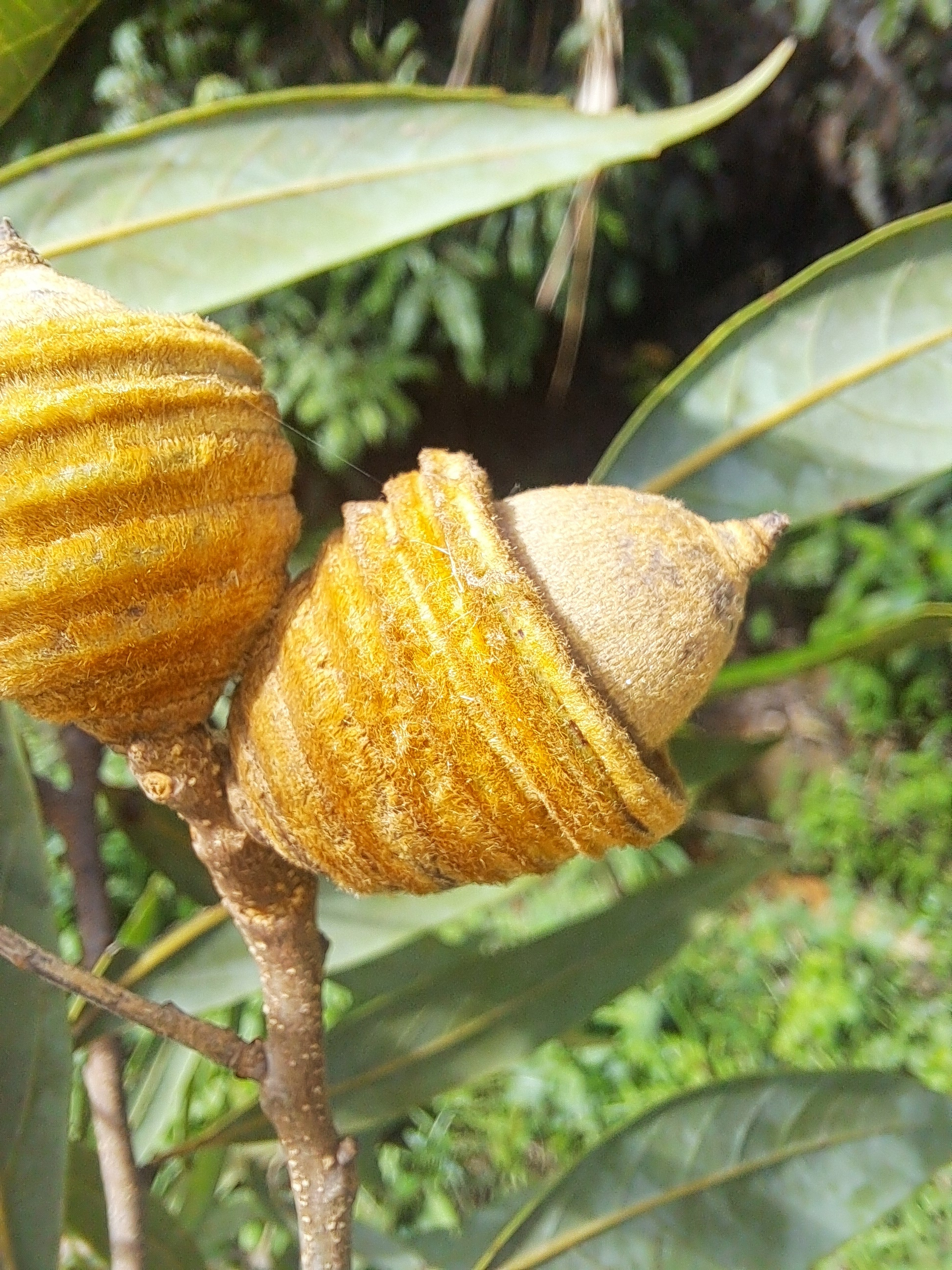

Conservation status
- Least Concern (IUCN 3.1)

Scientific classification
- Kingdom: Plantae
- Clade: Embryophytes
- Clade: Tracheophytes
- Clade: Spermatophytes
- Clade: Angiosperms
- Clade: Eudicots
- Clade: Rosids
- Order: Fagales
- Family: Fagaceae
- Genus: Quercus
- Subgenus: Quercus subg. Cerris
- Section: Quercus sect. Cyclobalanopsis
- Species: Q. pachyloma

Binomial name
- Quercus pachyloma Seemen

Synonyms
- Cyclobalanopsis pachyloma (Seemen) Schottky; Quercus tomentosicupula Hayata; Quercus picta Hand.-Mazz.; Cyclobalanopsis pachyloma var. mubianensis Y.C.Hsu & H.W.Jen; Cyclobalanopsis pachyloma var. tomentosicupula (Hayata) J.C.Liao; Quercus pachyloma var. mubianensis (Y.C.Hsu & H.Wei Jen) C.C.Huang

= Quercus pachyloma =

Species of oak tree native to Asia

Quercus pachyloma, commonly known as mao guo qing gang (Chinese: 毛果青冈), is a species of oak tree native to southern China and Taiwan. It is placed in the section Cyclobalanopsis within the Quercus subgenus Cerris.

== Distribution and habitat ==
Quercus pachyloma is native to southern China, including the provinces of Fujian, Guangdong, Guangxi, Guizhou, Hainan, Jiangxi, and Yunnan, and the main island of Taiwan. It grows in wet forests in valleys or on mountain slopes at elevations of 200–1,000 m (660–3,280 ft) above sea level.

== Description ==
Quercus pachyloma is a tree up to 17 meters tall. Twigs are covered with orange-brown hairs. Leaves can be as much as 14 cm long.
