= Lào Cai province =

Province of Vietnam

Lào Cai
- Province
- Tỉnh Lào Cai 省老街
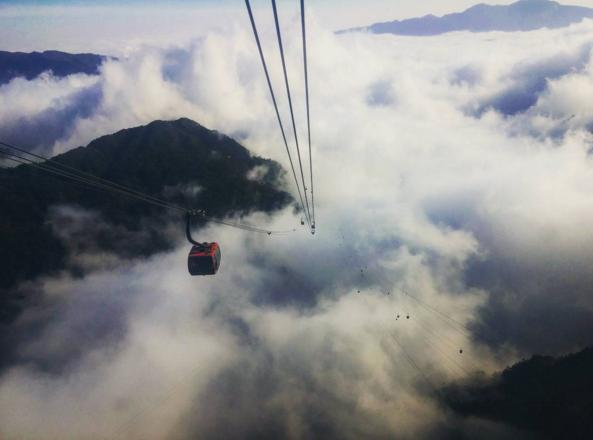
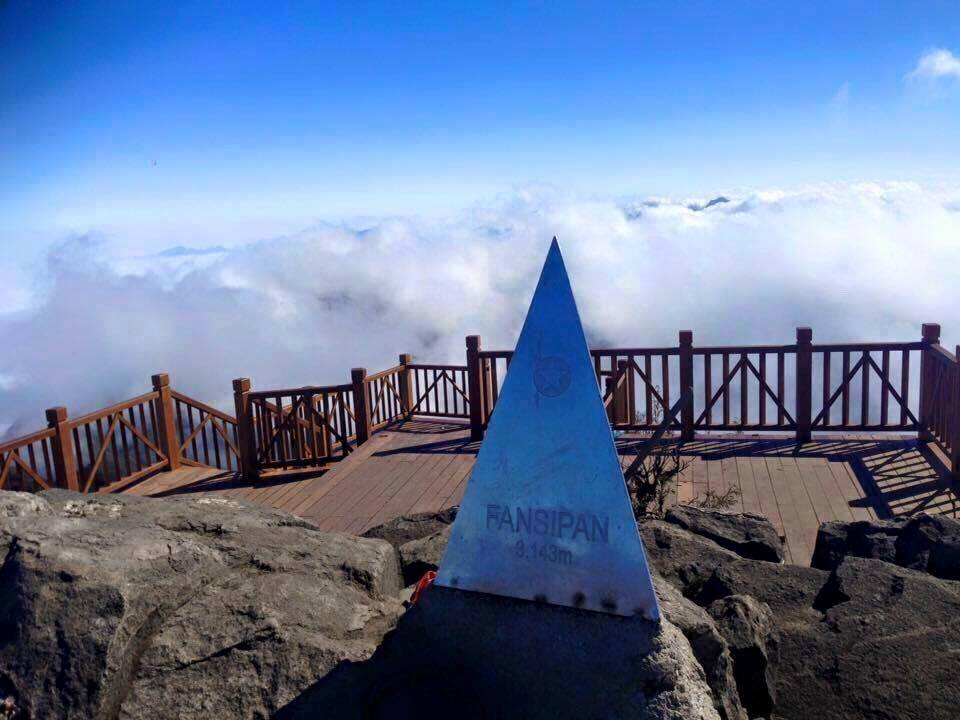
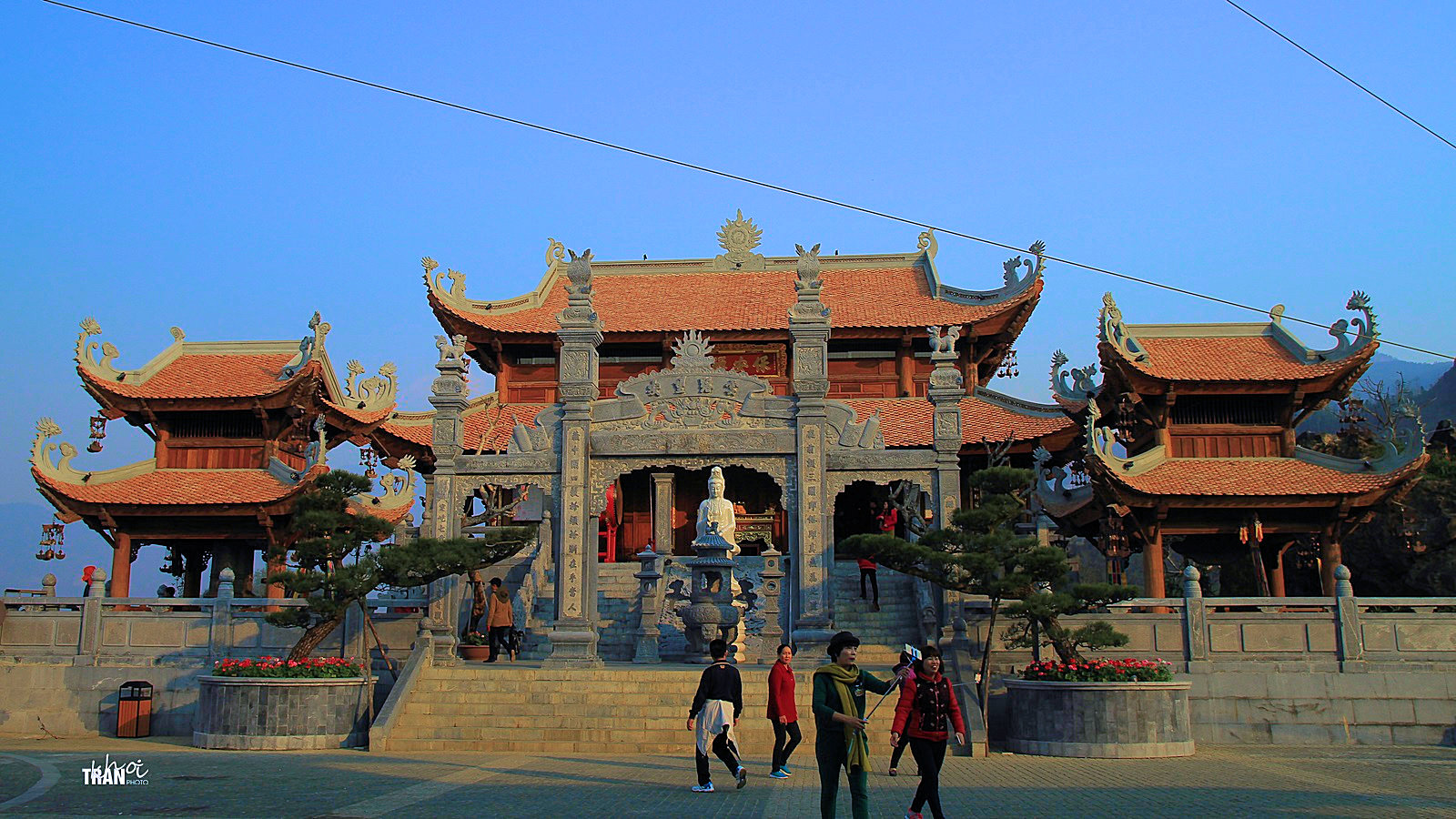
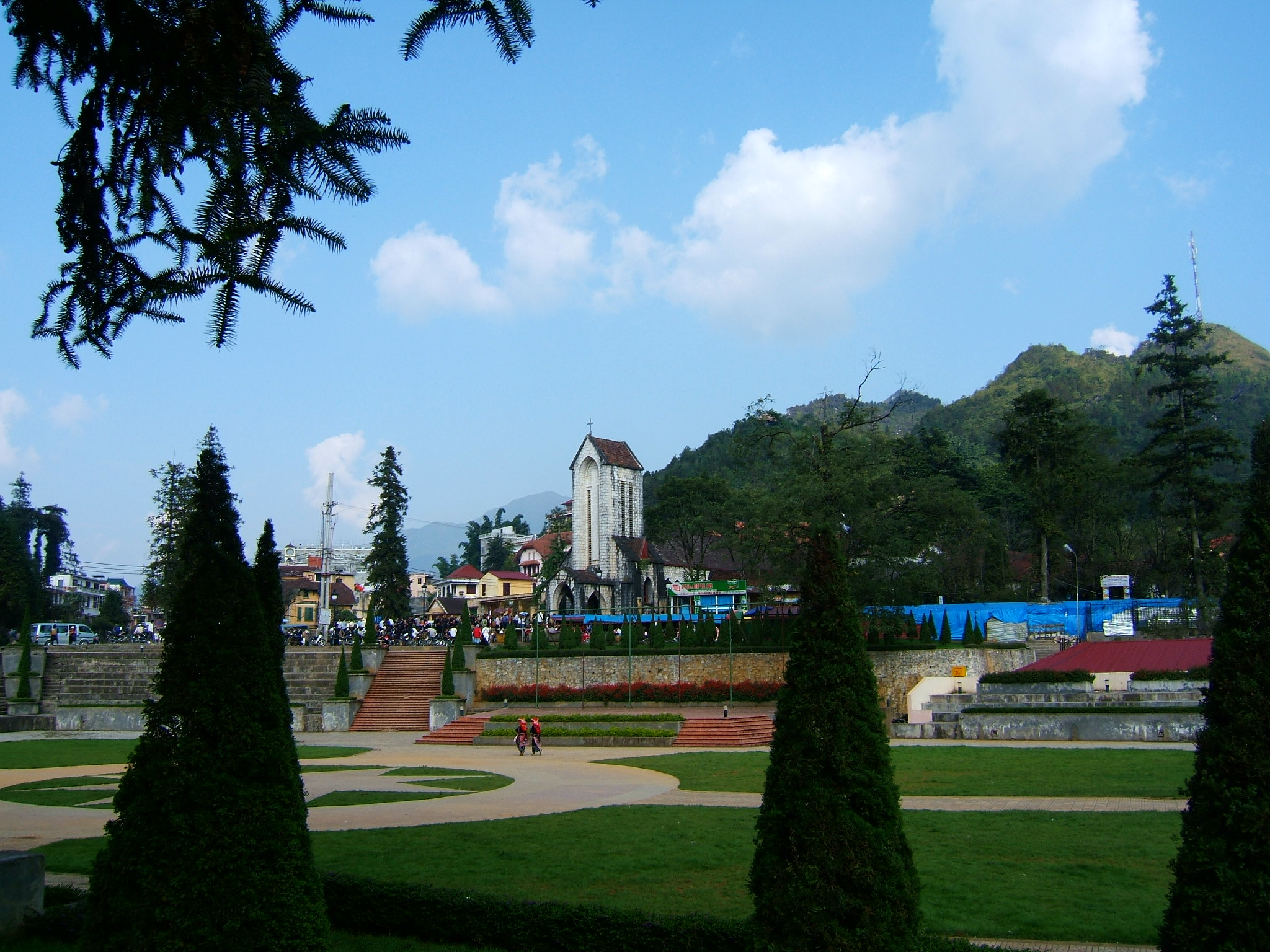
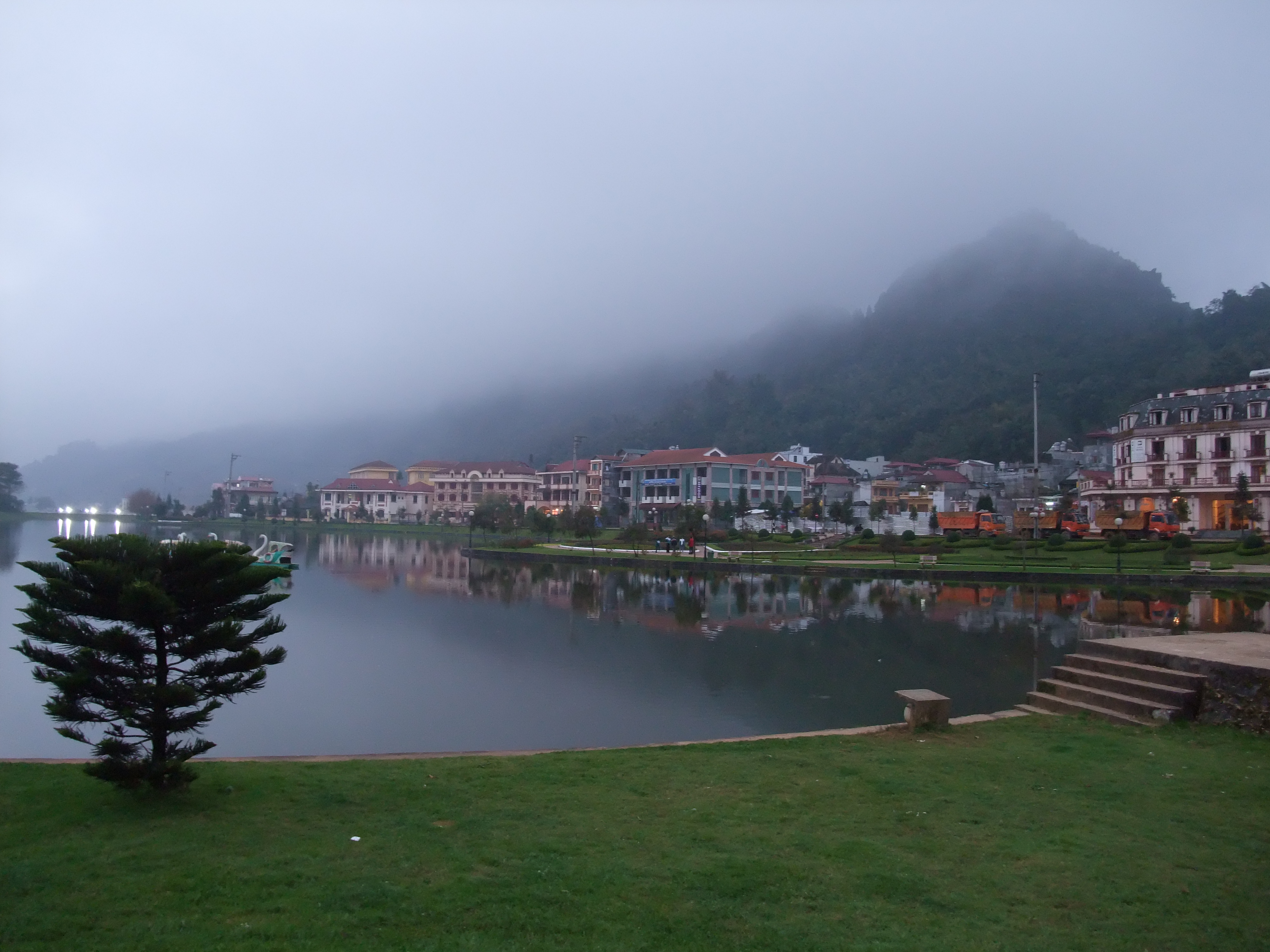
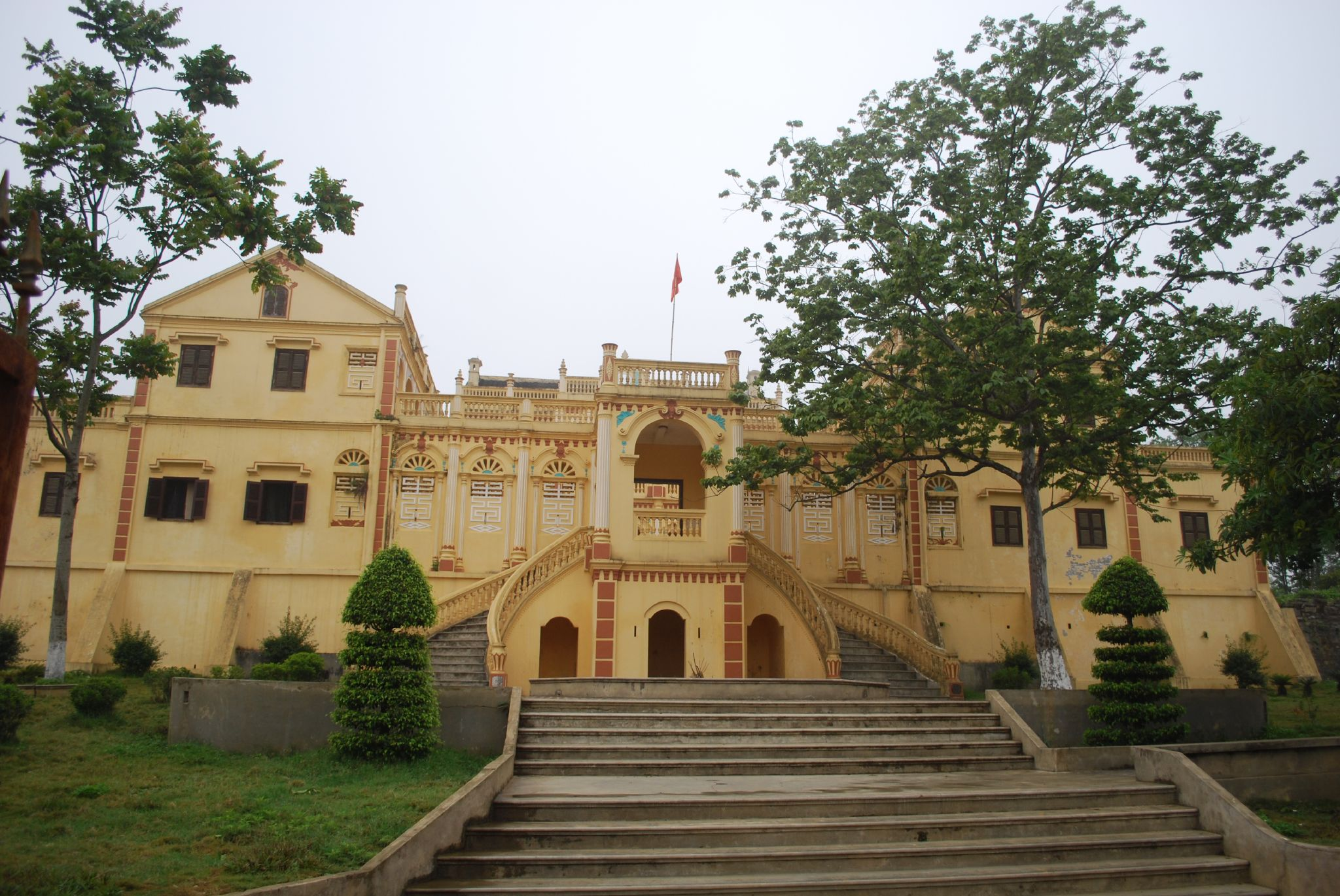
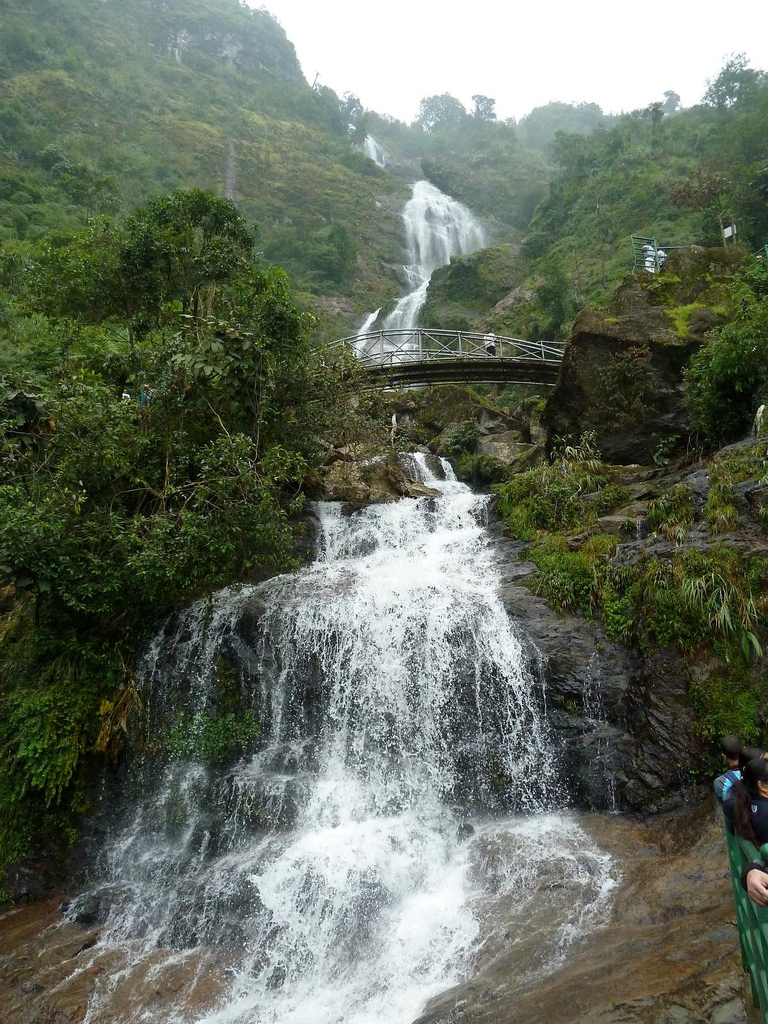
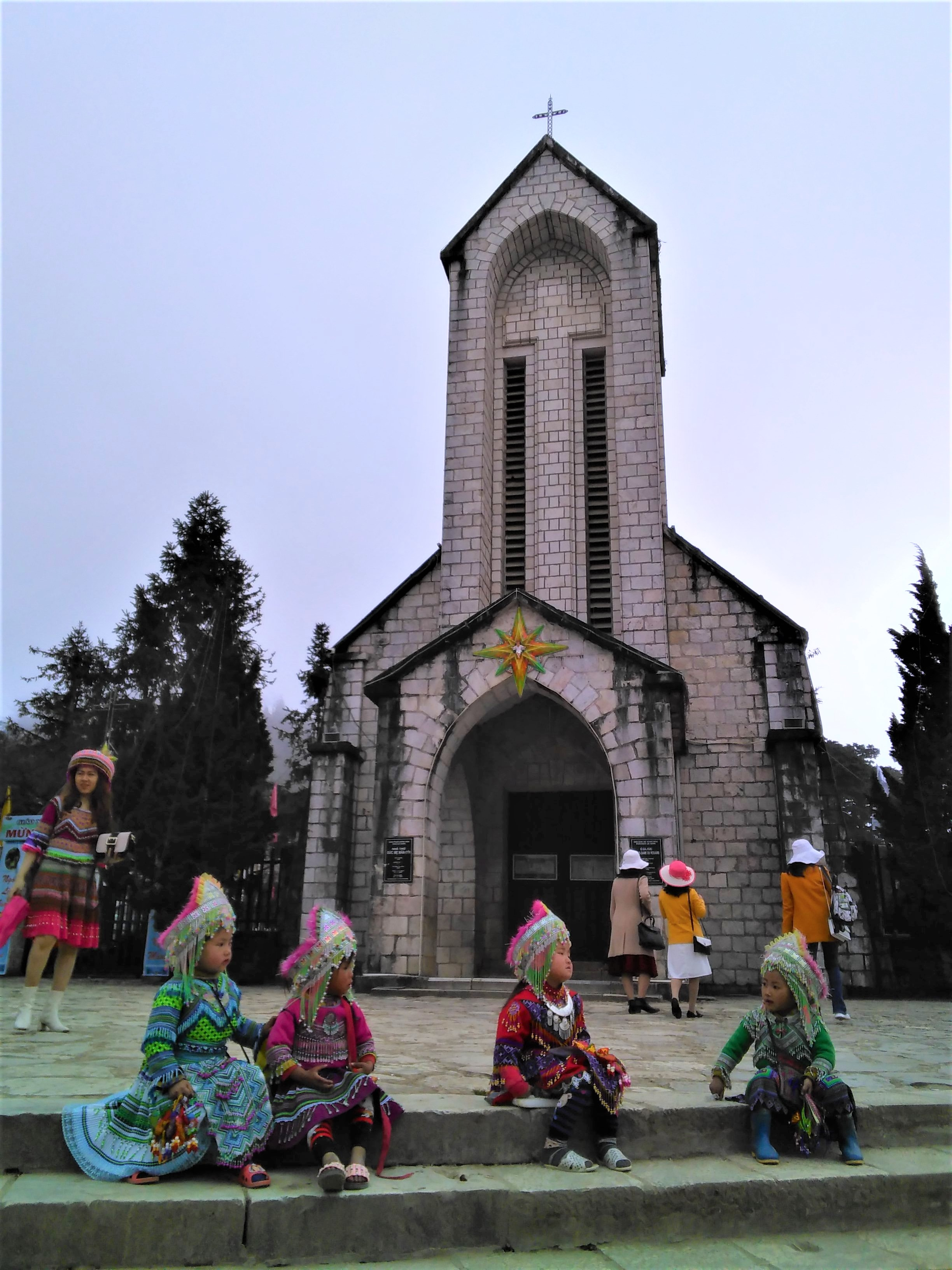
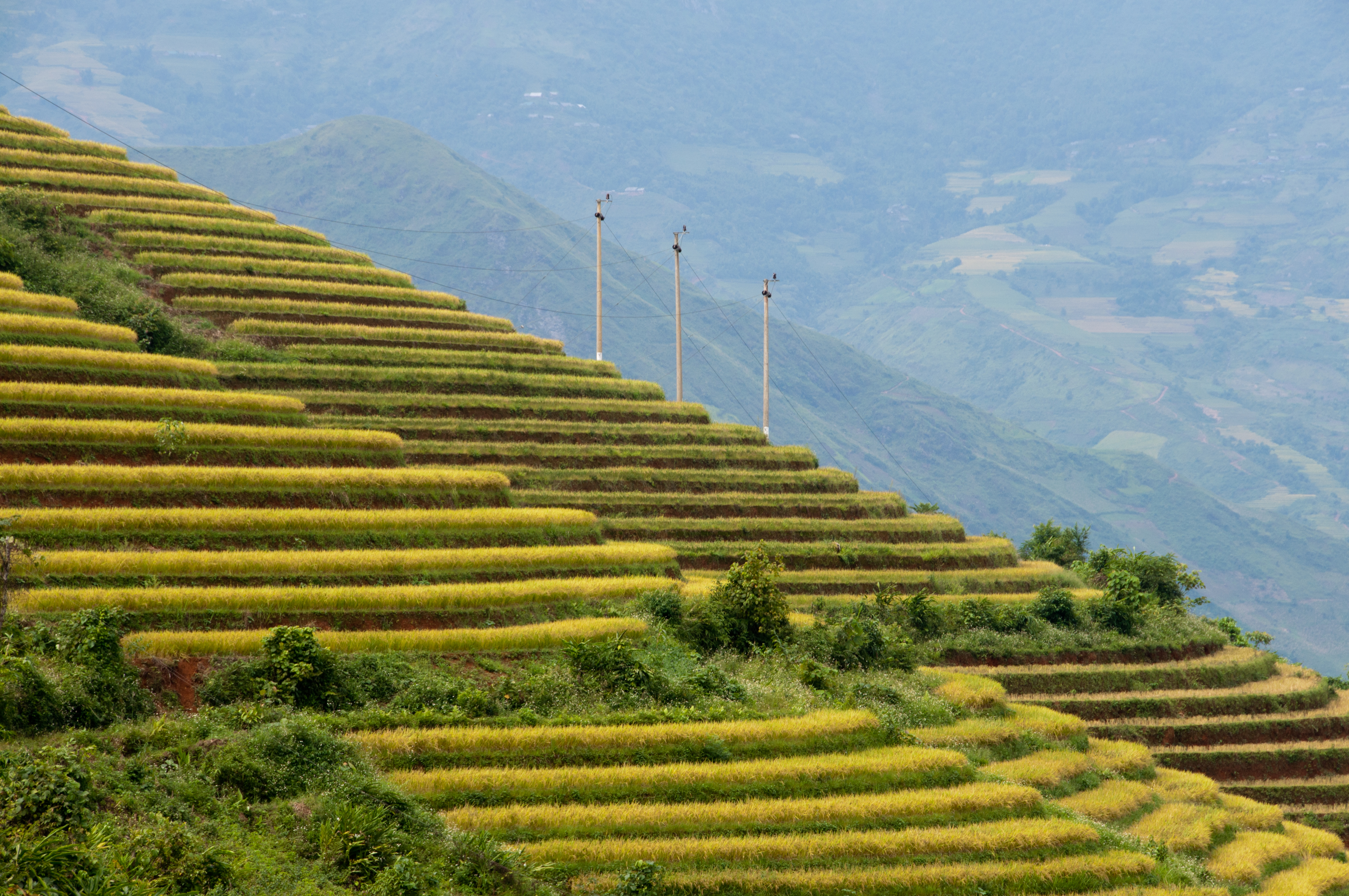
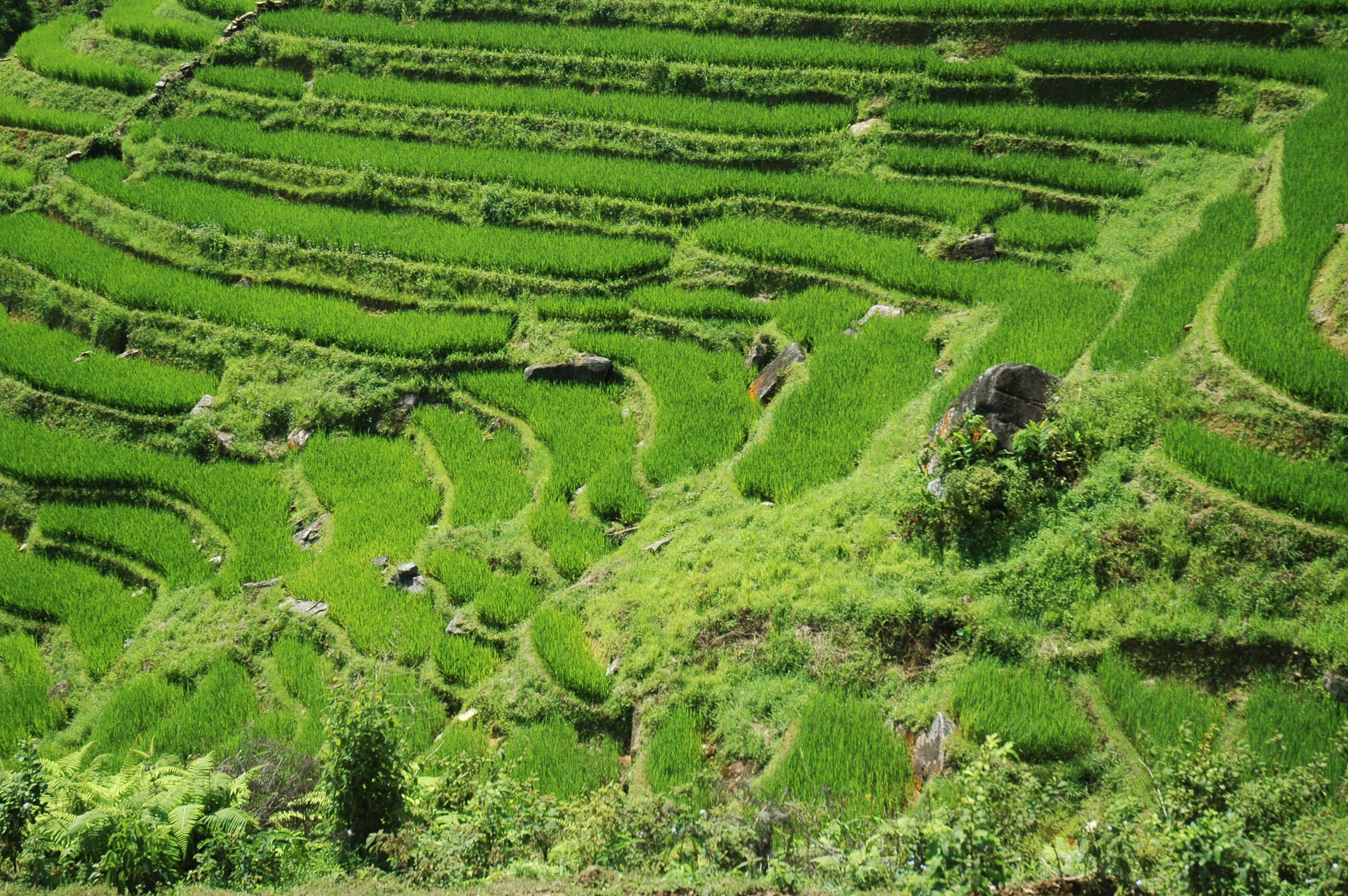
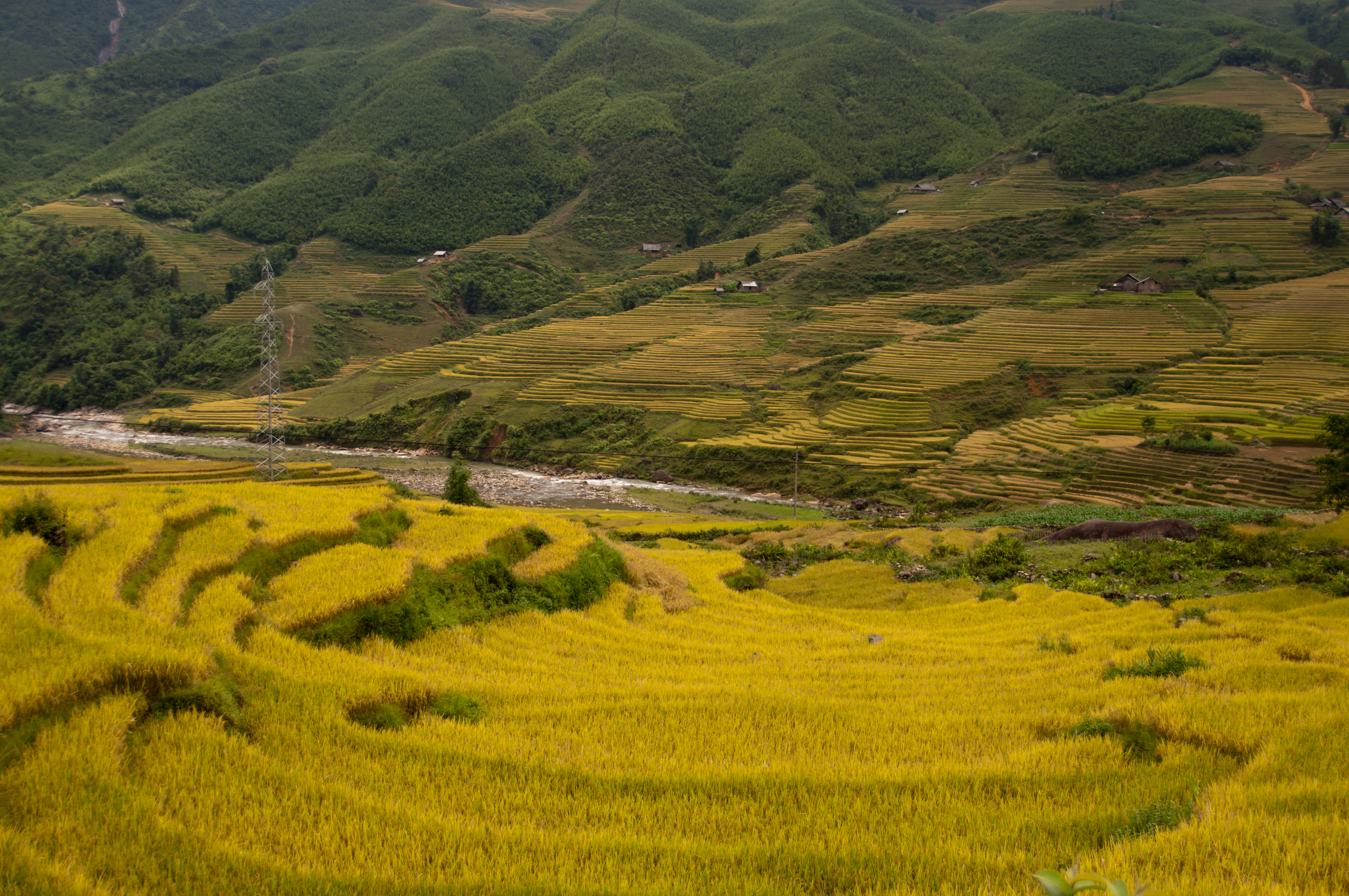
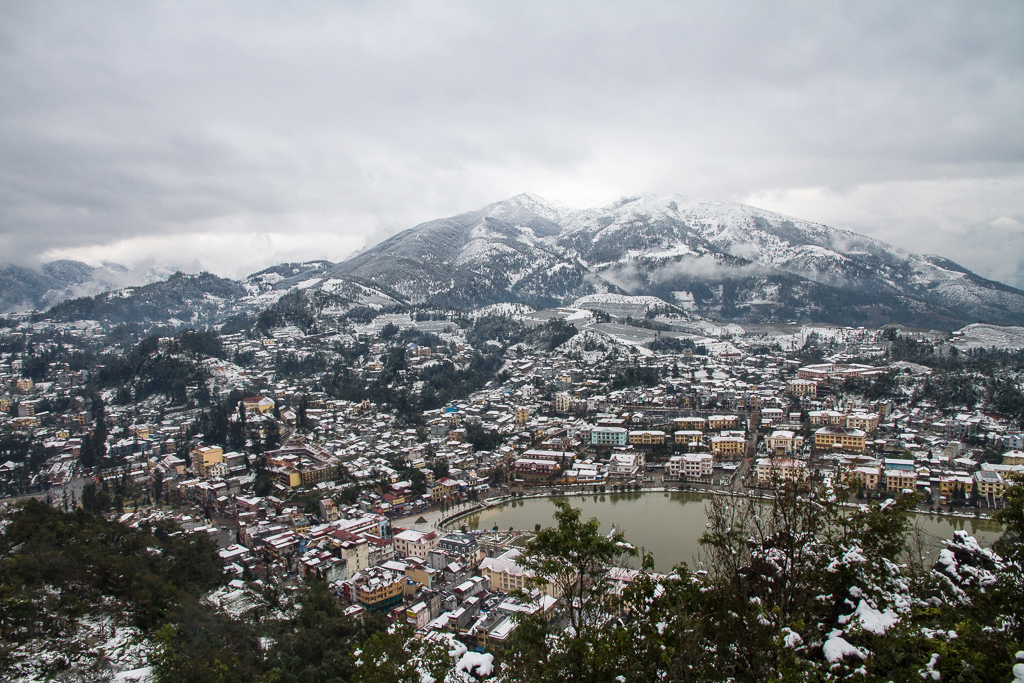
- Fansipan aerial tramway • Phan Xi Păng • Topas tourist area • Bảo An Temple • Lào Cai Mountain • Lào Cai City • Hoàng A Tưởng House • Sa Pa Terrace • Sa Pa Mountain • Stone church in Sa Pa • Bạc Waterfall • snowfall at Sa Pa

- Seal

- Interactive map of Lào Cai
- Coordinates: 22°20′N 104°0′E
- Country: Vietnam
- Region: Northern Midland and Mountainous
- Capital: Yên Bái ward
- Subdivision: 10 wards, 89 communes

Government
  - Type: Province
  - Body: Lào Cai Provincial People's Council
  - Chairman of People's Council: Nguyễn Văn Vịnh
  - Chairman of People's Committee: Trịnh Xuân Trường

Area
  - Total: 13,256.92 km^{2} (5,118.53 sq mi)

Population (2025)
  - Total: 1,778,785
  - Density: 134.1778/km^{2} (347.5190/sq mi)

Ethnic groups
  - Vietnamese: 33.78%
  - Mông: 25.08%
  - Tày: 14.83%
  - Dao: 14.24%
  - Giáy: 4.53%
  - Others: 7.54%

GDP
  - Province: VND 43.634 trillion US$ 1.895 billion
- Time zone: UTC+7 (ICT)
- Postal code: 31xxx
- Area codes: 214
- ISO 3166 code: VN-02
- HDI (2020): ▲0.687 (47th)
- Website: www.laocai.gov.vn

Lào Cai is a province in Northern Midland and Mountainous region of Vietnam bordering the province of Yunnan in China. The province covers an area of about 13,257 km^{2} (5,119 mi^{2}) and as of 2025 it had a population of 1,778,785 people.

Lào Cai and Sa Pa are two cities within the province at the border with China; the former is known as a trading post and the latter is hill station known for tourism. Lào Cai shares border with the city of Hekou, in the Yunnan province of Southwest China. This border town was closed after the 1979 war with China, and reopened in 1993. Sa Pa is a hill resort and market centre for the local ethnic Hmong, including the Red, Black, Green and Flower Hmong. Located across the Muong Hoa Valley from Vietnam's highest mountain, Fansipan, the city is sometimes referred to as the "queen of mountains". In a 1929 survey conducted in the area, the vegetation (flora) and fauna (mammals) recorded by the French biologist Delacour who accompanied Theodore Roosevelt were unique to the region in northern Vietnam.

== Etymology ==
The name "Lao-Kay" has been used by the French since the colonial era in their writing, pronounced as "Lào Cai" by the Vietnamese. The latter became official usage and spelling after November 1950.

There are explanations for the origin of the province's name. The area in the ward of Cốc Lếu was the site of a commercial district that developed into a market town. Because of this it was called Lão Nhai (老街, literally Phố Cũ, Old Town), in Hmong language it is pronounced as "Lao Cai". After this a new market town was developed and named Tân Nhai (新街, today Phố Mới, New Town). The word Lào Cai is sourced to "Lao Kai" which appeared as Jean Dupuis led a naval expedition up the Red River and in 1879 published the Map of Tonkin, in which the location was marked as "Lao-kai, residence du Chef des Pavillone noirs" (residence of the Head of Black Flag Army). According to Professor Đào Duy Anh, it derives from the word "Lão Nhai". While making maps, the French wrote it as "Lao-Kay" and this word was used by them in documents. When reading, the Vietnamese pronounced it Lào Cai.

== Geography ==
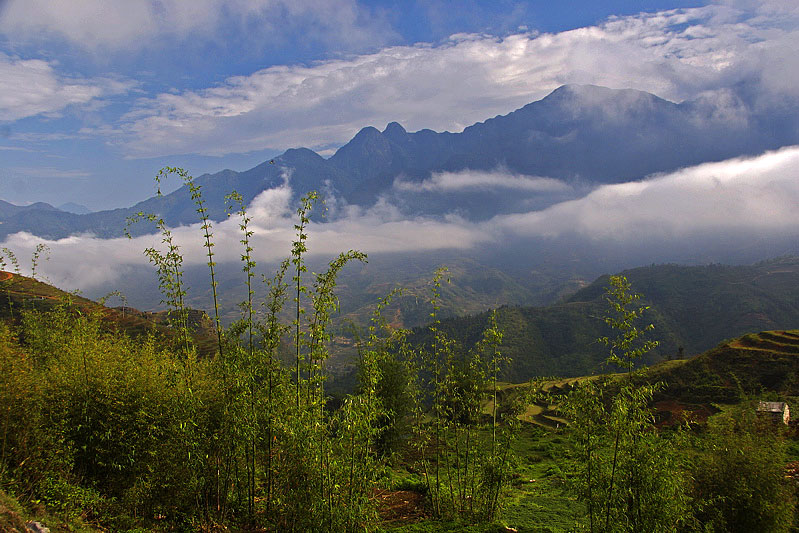
Sa Pa Mountains of Sa Pa

Lào Cai province is located in the north of the country and has an area of 13,256.92 km^{2} (5,118.53 mi^{2}). It borders the provinces of Tuyên Quang, Sơn La, Lai Châu, Phú Thọ, and Yunnan in the People's Republic of China.

There are ten major soil groups under 30 categories in the province, under ten land groups. The land groups are: The Alluvial group (1.47% of the land area) along the Red River; the Oxisol type which occupies 40% of land area has generally reddish brown soil, below altitude of 900 metres (3,000 ft), is a fertile land suitable for the annual and commercial crops; Team Red Yellow soil humus covers 30% land area in the Sa Pa, Mường Khương, Bắc Hà, Bát Xát districts of the province suitable for medicinal plants, fruit trees and vegetables; humus soil on the mountain occupies 11.42% of the land area mostly in Sa Pa district which has richer canopy of mixed forest; and the Oxisol color altered by rice in 2% of land area are formed into a landscape of terraced fields, as seen in Bắc Hà and Sa Pa districts.

The Hoàng Liên National Park was upgraded from a nature reserve in 2006. It covers an area of 24.66 square kilometres (30 km^{2} is also mentioned in some references) and contains the peak of Fan Si Pan, which, at 3,143 metres (10,312 ft), is the highest peak in Vietnam. Because of agricultural production of ginger and other land uses, about 12 kilometres (7.5 mi) of the park is forested. 1884 migrating raptors have been recorded in the national park. The area was surveyed by French biologist Delacour in 1929 who had accompanied Theodore Roosevelt to an expedition in southeast Asia. He collected 48 mammal species for the Chicago Natural History Museum. Sediments in the park date back to the Mesozoic era, whilst the granite is a Palaeocene intrusion. The northwestern boundary of the national park is made with a rugged boundary of marble and metamorphosed calcium carbonate.

Climate

As the province is mostly mountainous, it experiences a dry cold climate from October to March, while the tropical monsoon is rainy season, which lasts from April to September. The annual average temperature is 23 °C (73 °F). The temperature generally ranges between 18 °C (64 °F) and 28 °C (82 °F) in the lowland areas and between 20 °C (68 °F) and 22 °C (72 °F) in the highland areas. In Sa Pa town, the temperature can drop to less than 0 °C (32 °F) with snowy conditions. There are fog and frost in the province.

Climate data for Lào Cai
Month	Jan	Feb	Mar	Apr	May	Jun	Jul	Aug	Sep	Oct	Nov	Dec	Year
Record high °C (°F)	31.4 (88.5)	34.6 (94.3)	38.0 (100.4)	39.0 (102.2)	42.8 (109.0)	40.1 (104.2)	39.7 (103.5)	40.0 (104.0)	36.8 (98.2)	37.2 (99.0)	33.2 (91.8)	32.8 (91.0)	42.8 (109.0)
Mean daily maximum °C (°F)	20.1 (68.2)	21.3 (70.3)	25.3 (77.5)	28.8 (83.8)	32.1 (89.8)	32.7 (90.9)	32.7 (90.9)	32.4 (90.3)	31.3 (88.3)	28.7 (83.7)	25.1 (77.2)	21.9 (71.4)	27.7 (81.9)
Daily mean °C (°F)	15.7 (60.3)	17.0 (62.6)	20.7 (69.3)	24.2 (75.6)	27.0 (80.6)	27.9 (82.2)	27.9 (82.2)	27.5 (81.5)	26.3 (79.3)	24.0 (75.2)	20.2 (68.4)	17.0 (62.6)	23.0 (73.4)
Mean daily minimum °C (°F)	13.3 (55.9)	14.5 (58.1)	17.9 (64.2)	21.1 (70.0)	23.6 (74.5)	24.7 (76.5)	24.9 (76.8)	24.4 (75.9)	23.3 (73.9)	21.2 (70.2)	17.5 (63.5)	14.3 (57.7)	20.0 (68.0)
Record low °C (°F)	1.4 (34.5)	5.6 (42.1)	6.8 (44.2)	10.0 (50.0)	14.8 (58.6)	18.7 (65.7)	20.0 (68.0)	17.3 (63.1)	15.8 (60.4)	8.8 (47.8)	5.8 (42.4)	2.8 (37.0)	1.4 (34.5)
Average precipitation mm (inches)	22 (0.9)	33 (1.3)	58 (2.3)	129 (5.1)	171 (6.7)	239 (9.4)	302 (11.9)	355 (14.0)	222 (8.7)	153 (6.0)	54 (2.1)	27 (1.1)	1,764 (69.4)
Average rainy days	7.8	8.8	11.5	15.8	16.8	18.7	20.9	21.1	15.8	14.8	10.2	7.7	169.8
Average relative humidity (%)	84.8	84.0	82.5	83.1	81.4	84.4	85.8	86.0	85.5	85.8	86.3	85.8	84.6
Mean monthly sunshine hours	80.4	76.9	105.0	144.9	189.2	148.9	166.6	168.1	162.5	129.9	105.4	110.6	1,588.4
Source 1: Vietnam Institute for Building Science and Technology
Source 2: The Yearbook of Indochina

Climate data for Sa Pa
Month	Jan	Feb	Mar	Apr	May	Jun	Jul	Aug	Sep	Oct	Nov	Dec	Year
Record high °C (°F)	23.2 (73.8)	25.8 (78.4)	28.1 (82.6)	29.8 (85.6)	30.0 (86.0)	29.4 (84.9)	29.1 (84.4)	29.6 (85.3)	28.2 (82.8)	26.4 (79.5)	24.5 (76.1)	24.0 (75.2)	30.0 (86.0)
Mean daily maximum °C (°F)	12.3 (54.1)	14.3 (57.7)	18.2 (64.8)	21.3 (70.3)	22.4 (72.3)	22.9 (73.2)	23.0 (73.4)	23.0 (73.4)	21.7 (71.1)	19.0 (66.2)	16.1 (61.0)	13.2 (55.8)	18.9 (66.0)
Daily mean °C (°F)	8.6 (47.5)	10.4 (50.7)	13.9 (57.0)	17.1 (62.8)	18.9 (66.0)	19.8 (67.6)	19.8 (67.6)	19.5 (67.1)	18.2 (64.8)	15.7 (60.3)	12.5 (54.5)	9.4 (48.9)	15.3 (59.5)
Mean daily minimum °C (°F)	6.2 (43.2)	7.8 (46.0)	10.8 (51.4)	14.0 (57.2)	16.3 (61.3)	17.6 (63.7)	17.7 (63.9)	17.4 (63.3)	15.9 (60.6)	13.7 (56.7)	10.2 (50.4)	7.0 (44.6)	12.9 (55.2)
Record low °C (°F)	−6.1 (21.0)	−1.3 (29.7)	−3.5 (25.7)	3.4 (38.1)	8.3 (46.9)	10.8 (51.4)	7.0 (44.6)	10.4 (50.7)	8.7 (47.7)	5.6 (42.1)	1.0 (33.8)	−3.2 (26.2)	−6.1 (21.0)
Average precipitation mm (inches)	70.2 (2.76)	73.5 (2.89)	104.5 (4.11)	213.4 (8.40)	340.6 (13.41)	381.4 (15.02)	461.0 (18.15)	451.9 (17.79)	303.1 (11.93)	201.3 (7.93)	106.3 (4.19)	65.7 (2.59)	2,779.6 (109.43)
Average rainy days	16.3	16.3	15.7	17.9	22.2	24.4	25.6	23.4	19.8	18.6	13.8	13.5	228.1
Average relative humidity (%)	87.8	85.5	82.1	82.3	84.8	86.9	88.3	88.8	90.0	90.8	80.5	80.3	87.2
Mean monthly sunshine hours	113.3	115.6	151.2	167.8	148.1	98.9	104.1	114.2	101.7	94.0	112.5	121.0	1,435.9
Source 1: Vietnam Institute for Building Science and Technology
Source 2: The Yearbook of Indochina

Water resources

In the northwest of the province is Phan Xi Păng (also called Fansipan; elevation 3,143 metres (10,312 ft), snow covered during winter season), Vietnam's highest mountain. It is located in the Hoàng Liên Sơn and the Hoàng Liên National Park. The Sa Pa Mountains form the western part of the province. While the province is drained by over 100 rivers, the main river that bisects the province is the Red River, which flows out of China towards the capital Hanoi. It flows through the province over a length of 130 kilometres (81 mi). Other rivers include the Chay and Nam Ti Rivers.

Ground water resources have been estimated reserves as 4,448 million cubic metres out of which good quality water is estimated as 30 million cubic metres. There are four mineral water sources.

Mineral resources

30 types of mineral resources have been identified. Some of the mineral reserves are: copper (53 million tons), molybdenum (15 million tons), apatite and iron (2.5 billion tons). There are 150 mines in the province exploiting various minerals.

== Flora and fauna ==
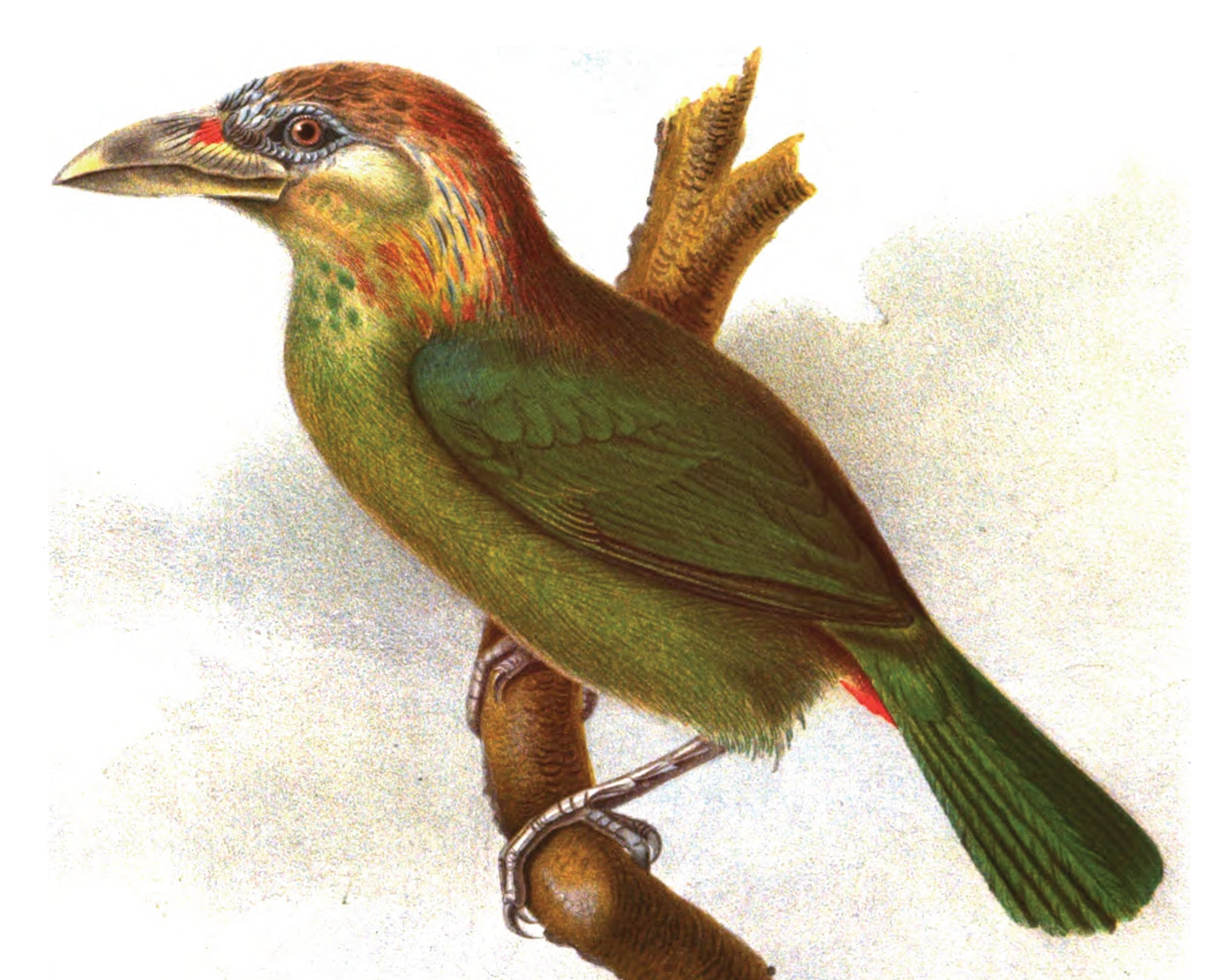
Red-vented barbet found in Lào Cai province in North Vietnam

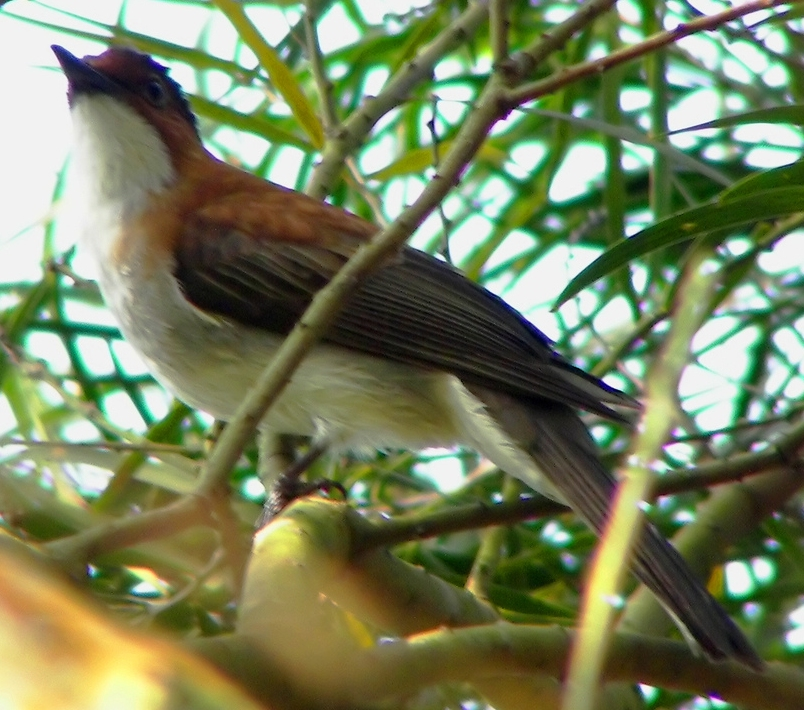
Chestnut bulbul found in Lào Cai province

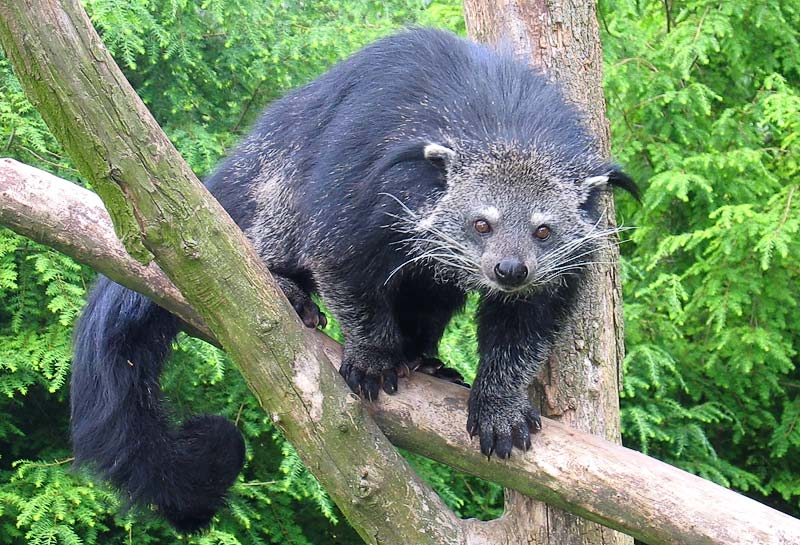
Binturong (Arctictus binturong) found in Lào Cai province

Forests account for 2,789.07 kilometres (1,733.05 mi), accounting for 43.87% of the province's area, of which 2,292.97 kilometres (1,424.79 mi) is natural while the remainder is plantation forestry. The forests feature 442 species, including types of birds, insects and frogs. The province has a forest reserve known for its species of timber plants; some of the species are: po mu (fukiena), lat hoa (chukrasia tabularis), and cho chi, apart from species of medicinal herbs.

In the Fansipan mountain ranges, vegetation varies with altitude, with elevation above 1,500 metres (4,900 ft) retaining the forests. In the elevation range of 2,500–2,800 metres (8,200–9,200 ft), which is the mist area, "elfin forest" is the dominant forest vegetation of "gnarled trees (Tsuga yunanaris)" of less than 8 metres (26 ft) height covered with moss. Above 2,800 metres (9,200 ft) elevation, the mountain range has bamboos and rhododendrons.

The Hoang Lien National Park has 12 square kilometres (4.6 mi^{2}) of forest left as a result of anthropogenic pressure over centuries. Grass, bushes and trees are seen on the land, and some areas are used for cultivation, including ginger plantation.

According to a 1929 survey conducted in the area, the fauna (mammals) recorded by the French biologist Delacour who accompanied Theodore Roosevelt were: the clouded leopard (Neofelis nebuiosa), leopard (Panthera pardus), tiger (panthera tigris), binturong (Arctictus binturong) and black gibbon (Hylobates concolor), the stump-tailed macaque (Macaca arctoides), and Asiatic black bear (Selenarctos thibetanus). In Sa Pa forests, 150 species of birds were recorded such as the red-vented barbet ( Megalaima lagrandieri), collared finchbill (Spizixo semitoroues), white-throated laughingthrush (Garrulax albogularis) and the chestnut bulbul (Hypsipetes castanotus); all species are considered exclusive to North Vietnam.

== History ==
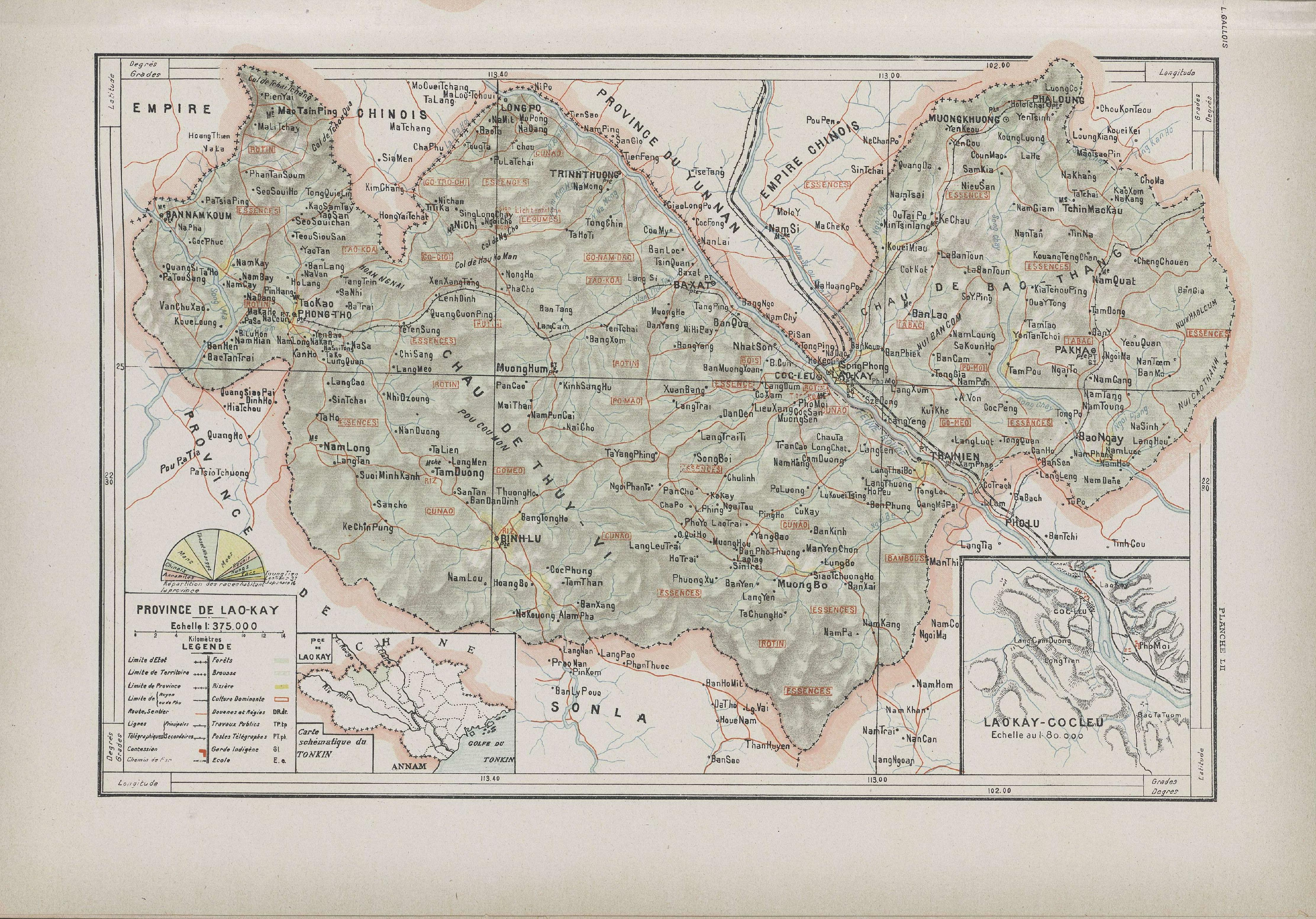
Map of Lao Kay province in 1909

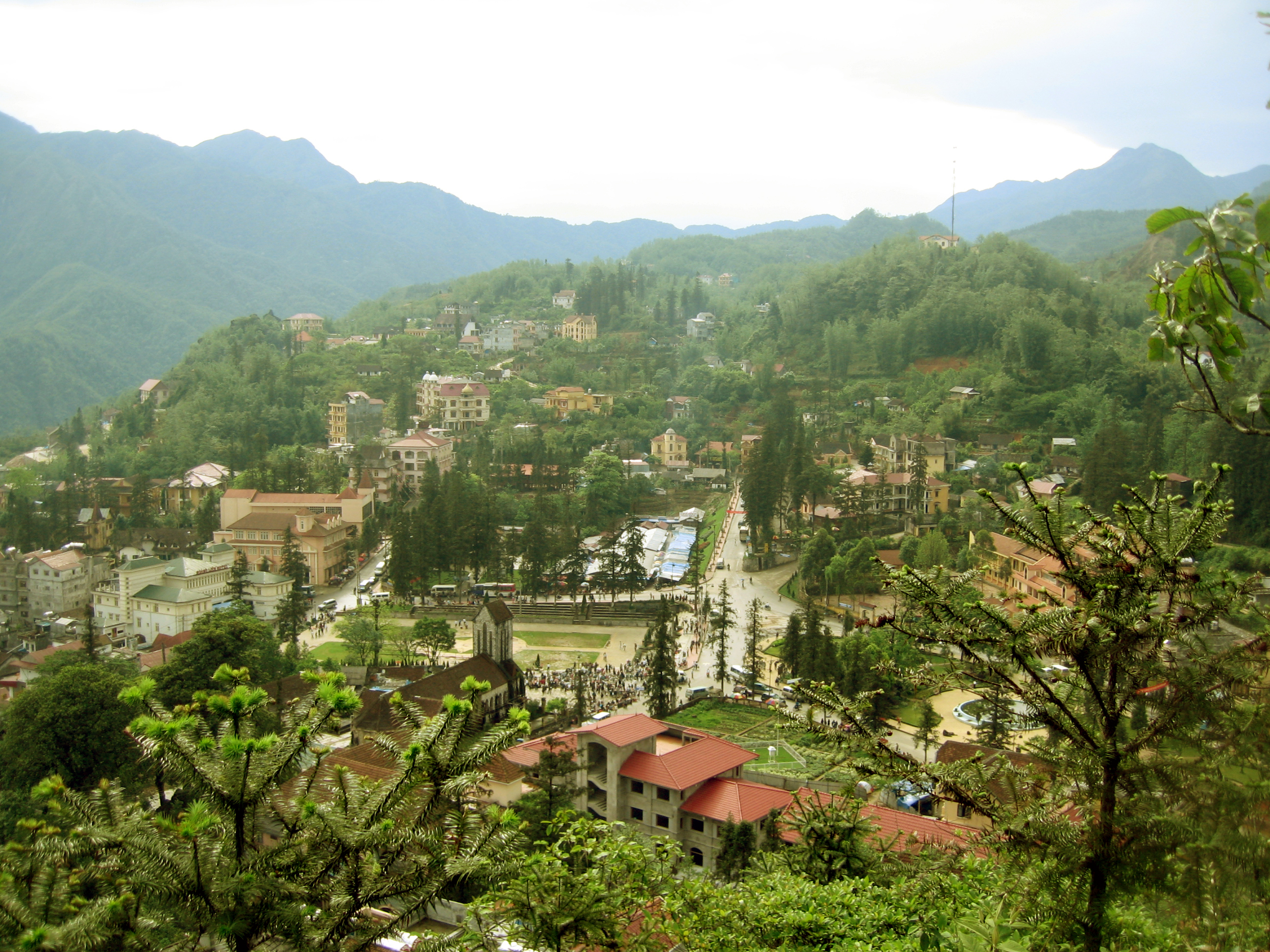
Sa Pa town

Lào Cai has been known as a historic trading post. Here, the Chinese, the Vietnamese and the ethnic minorities of the region fought to gain control of the region. In 1463, the Viet Kings established Lào Cai as the capital of their northernmost region, then named as Hưng Hóa. It came under French colonial rule in 1889 and was their administrative town, and also served as a military garrison. In the 19th century the first railway line was built from Hanoi to this region. It took seven years to complete and at the cost of 25,000 lives of Vietnamese people who were conscripted labourers.

In 1978, Vietnam invaded Cambodia due to constant attacks resulting in massacres from the Khmer Rouge on Vietnamese soil. The Chinese, as allies of the Khmer Rouge, invaded North Vietnam with the aim of "teaching the Vietnamese a lesson" to withdraw from Cambodia. The attack was launched by 200,000-600,000 People's Liberation Army personnel. They occupied territory from Paso (previously known as Phon Tho) in the Northwest to Cao Bằng and Lạng Sơn in the Northwest. China managed to take these cities, decided to withdraw completely after less than a month and claimed that ‘the gate to Hanoi was open’ and that ‘their punitive mission had been achieved’. On the way back to the Chinese border, the PLA destroyed local infrastructure and homes, looted equipment and resources including livestock. The PLA completely pulled out on March 16. Both sides declared victory with China claiming their ‘mission was successful’ and Vietnam successfully repelling a Chinese Invasion. Following the invasion, the border with China was closed for years. The war also resulted in the planting of land mines that continue to inflict casualties along the border with China.

Since 2006, Lào Cai has had city status and is the largest town in the region. An airport is planned to be built by 2020.

On June 12, 2025, the National Assembly passed Resolution No. 202/2025/QH15, which took effect the same day, merging Yên Bái Province into Lào Cai Province.

== Economy ==
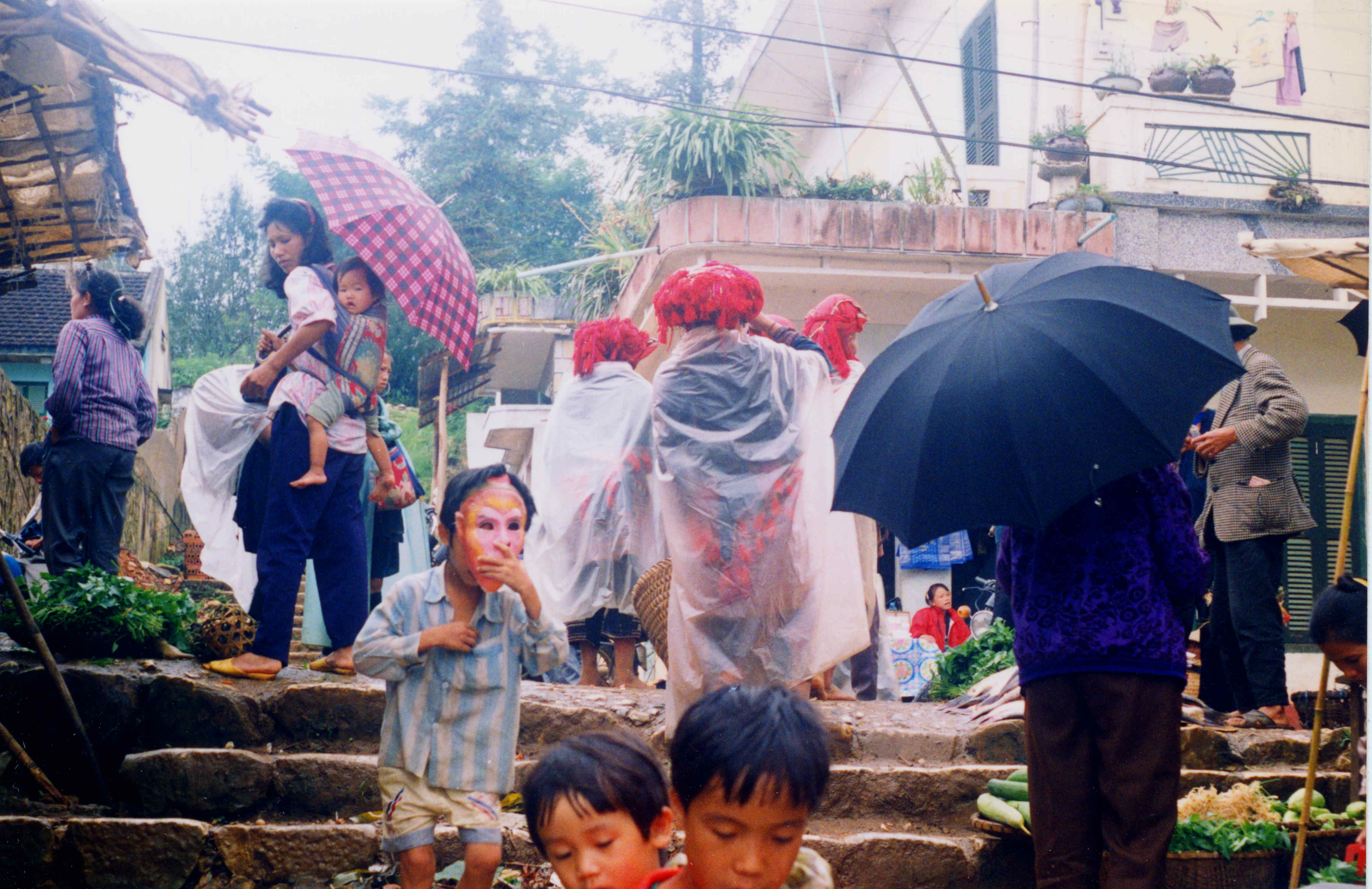
Sa Pa Market

As against the national figure of 7,592 cooperatives, there are 19 cooperatives in the province, out of which 17 are agricultural cooperatives and one is a fisheries cooperative. There are 253 farms as compared to the national number of 120,699. The output value of agriculture produce at constant 1994 prices in the province was 663 billion đồngs against the national value of 156,681.9 billion đồngs.

In 2008, the province produced 199,800 tonnes of cereals compared to the national production of 43.68 million tonnes. The per capita production of cereals in the province was 491.4 kilograms (1,083 lb) as against the national figure of 331.7 kilograms (731 lb) in 2008.

In 2007, the industrial output of the province was 1,916.2 bill. đồngs against the national output of 1.47 million billion đồngs.

== Demographics ==
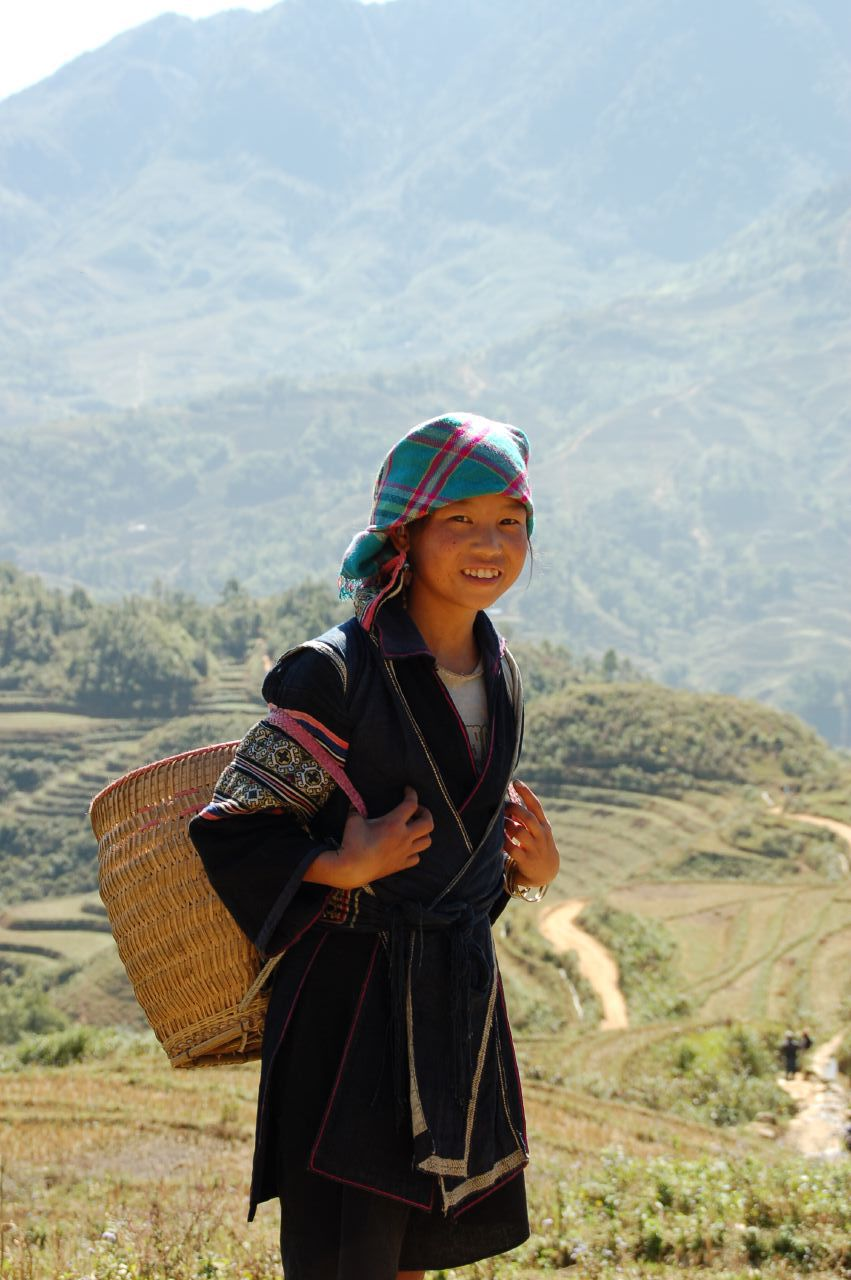
A H'mong girl

According to the General Statistics Office of the Government of Vietnam, the population of Lào Cai province, as of 2008, was 602,300 with a density of 94 persons per square kilometre over a total land area of 6,383.9 square kilometres (2,464.8 mi^{2}) of the province. The male population during this period was 303,300 with females accounting for 299,000. The urban population was 125,900 against an urban population of 476,400 (about 25% of the rural population).

The province has 25 of Vietnam's ethnic minority groups, accounting for 64.09% of its population. The largest ethnic groups are: Vietnamese - 35.9%, Hmong - 22.21%, Tay - 15.84%, Dao -14.05%, Giay - 4.7%, Nùng - 4.4% and the others belong to Phu La, San Chay, Ha Nhi, and the La Chi groups.

== Transport ==
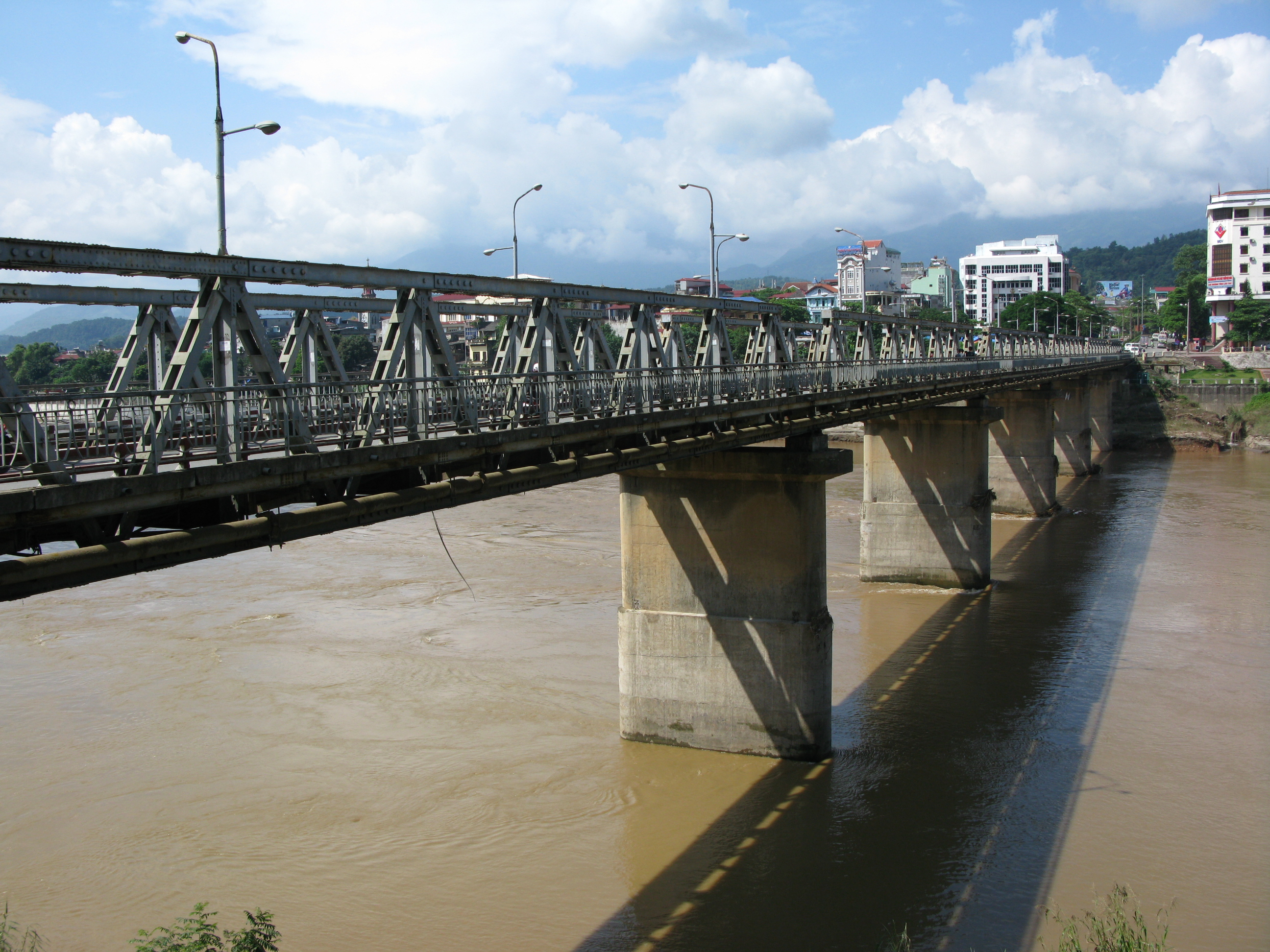
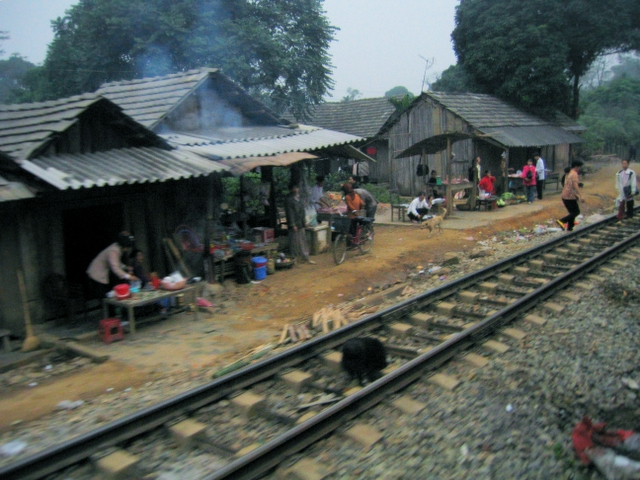
Left: Coc Leu Bridge, Lào Cai city. Right: Railway between Sa Pa and Lào Cai

An airport is planned in Bao Yen District. The provincial city is connected by road, rail and river transport links with Hanoi on its northwest (340 kilometres (210 mi)) and to Yunnan province in China. Within the province, road links exist to Sa Pa and Bắc Hà. There is the Haiphong railway to Yunnan. There are four national highways totaling to a length of 400 km, provincial roads of about 300 km length and 1,000 km of village roads. Red River flowing through the province provides water transport facilities.

== Attractions ==
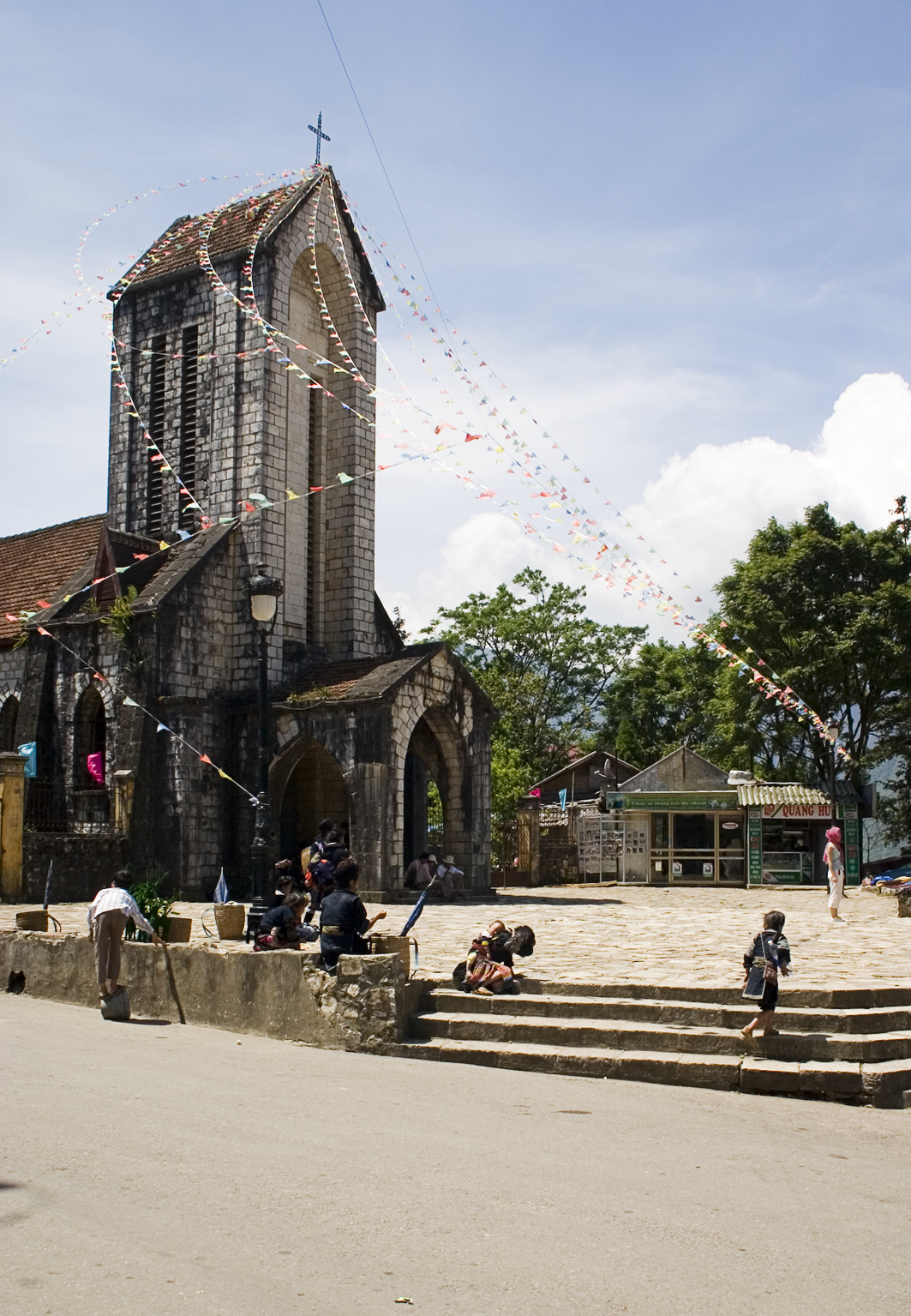
The Catholic church in Sa Pa, built in stone in 1930

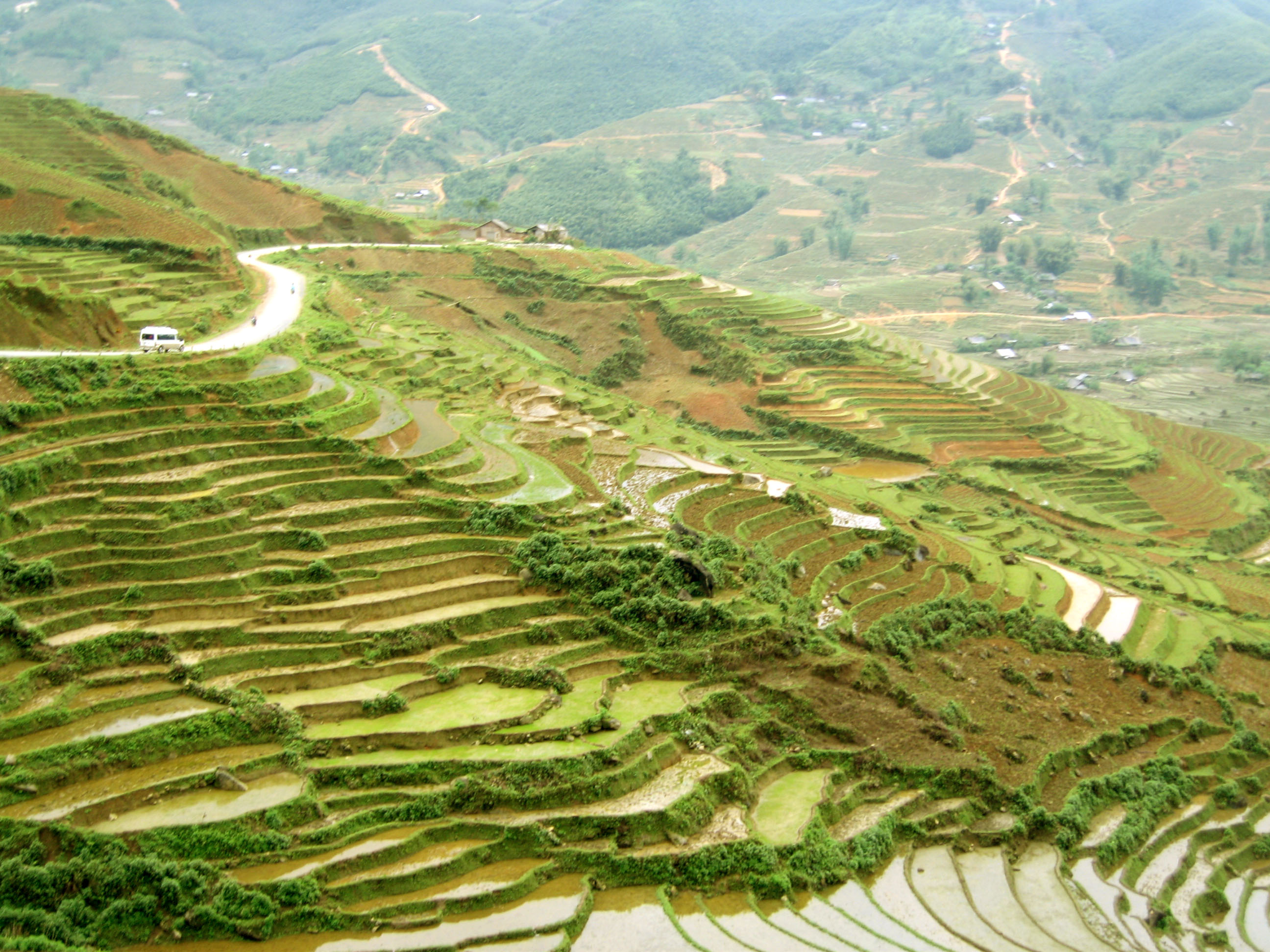
Rice fields in Sa Pa in different shades of green

Border travel packages for tourists, arranged between China and Vietnam under the political set up in Vietnam, has relaxed regulations permitting tourists to visit selected locations under conducted tours to places in Northern Vietnam and particularly to the provincial headquarter of Lào Cai; Lào Cai is the last stop before crossing into China on way to Kunming across the border, which lies at the end of the train line to China. Since then the Chinese tourists visiting Lào Cai on a one-day trip or two days trip including the hill station town of Sa Pa. Chinese travellers are said to be "obsessed with Zhao Xiaojie ("looking for misses") for its sex market. A male tourist from China made a mention: "There is a common saying in China: Vietnam sacrifices one generation of young women for the well-being of the next three generations." A motorbiking route covering the mountainous region of the province known as the "Tonkinese Alps" starts from the White Thai villages, Sơn La, historic site of Dien Bien Phu and terminates at Sa Pa.

Sa Pa is one of 21 national tourism areas in Vietnam. Sa Pa is at an altitude of 1,200–1,800 metres (3,900–5,900 ft), has a mild climate throughout the year, lush, forested and mountainous scenery, waterfalls and is a hub of cultural activities of ethnic minorities in the region, such as the Hmong and Dao people used to gather during the weekly market to attend a "Love Market" where men and women chose partners to marry. It is 38 km away from the border town of Lào Cai. The French had established a Travel Bureau, as early as 1917, and the town was known among the "French colonist" through their rule as a hill resort. Sa Pa has gone through rounds of destruction between 1947 and 1953, and again in 1979 due to war with French and Chinese. It has been partly restored and has gradually become a tourist hub since the region was opened to tourism in 1993. Rice fields in green shades are harvested in the fall season (September to November). The colours of the rice fields indicate the time for harvesting plots. Women of ethnic minority tribes, with red and indigo-coloured dresses, harvest crops on the fields.

Other destinations include Y Ty, Bach Moc Luong Tu Pass, and Coc Ly Market.
