= List of data deficient plants =

- Extinct in the wild (EW): 46 species
- Critically endangered (CR): 6,445 species
- Endangered (EN): 12,707 species
- Vulnerable (VU): 10,596 species
- Near threatened (NT, LR/cd): 4,880 species
- Least concern (LC): 35,732 species
- Data deficient (DD): 6,317 species
Plant species (IUCN, 2025.2)
- 76,864 extant species have been evaluated
- 70,547 of those are fully assessed (Note: excludes data deficient evaluations.)
- 40,612 are not threatened at present
- 29,935 are threatened (Note: Threatened comprises CR, EN and VU.)
- 187 to 892 are extinct or extinct in the wild:
  - 141 extinct (EX) species (Note: Chart omits extinct (EX) species)
  - 46 extinct in the wild (EW)
  - 648 possibly extinct [CR(PE)]
  - 57 possibly extinct in the wild [CR(PEW)]

As of September 2016, the International Union for Conservation of Nature (IUCN) lists 1674 data deficient plant species. 7.6% of all evaluated plant species are listed as data deficient. The IUCN also lists 18 subspecies and 57 varieties as data deficient. No subpopulations of plants have been evaluated by the IUCN.

This is a complete list of data deficient plant species, subspecies and varieties evaluated by the IUCN.

== Algae ==
There are 49 alga species evaluated as data deficient.

=== Green algae ===
- Ectochaete perforans
- Rhizoclonium robustum

=== Red algae ===
- Ahnfeltiopsis smithii
- Alsidium pusillum
- Amphiroa compressa
- Amphiroa crustiformis
- Amphiroa galapagensis
- Antithamnion veleroae
- Archaeolithothamnion crosslandii
- Asparagopsis svedelii
- Austrofolium howellii
- Botryocladia darwinii
- Callithamnion ecuadoreanum
- Callithamnion epiphyticum
- Ceramium hoodii
- Ceramium howellii
- Ceramium prostratum
- Ceramium templetonii
- Chondria flexicaulis
- Chondrus albemarlensis
- Chondrus hancockii
- Galaxaura intermedia
- Goniolithon alternans
- Gracilaria ecuadoreanus
- Halymenia santamariae
- Kallymenia multiloba
- Kallymenia setchellii
- Laurencia congesta
- Laurencia densissima
- Laurencia ligulata
- Laurencia mediocris
- Lithophyllum amplostratum
- Lithophyllum complexum
- Lithophyllum mutabile
- Lithophyllum rileyi
- Lithophyllum sancti-georgei
- Lithothamnion cottonii
- Lithothamnion pocillum
- Mesophyllum laxum
- Nitophyllum divaricatum
- Prionitis galapagensis
- Prionitis hancockii
- Pterosiphonia paucicorticata
- Rhodymenia decumbens
- Sebdenia rubra
- Tenarea erecta

=== Charophyta ===
- Chara nuda
- Chara setosa
- Nitella annamalaiensis

== Bryophytes ==
There are seven bryophyte species evaluated as data deficient.

=== Mosses ===
- Drepanocladus hallii
- Drepanocladus sparsus
- Isopterygium strangulatum

=== Liverworts ===
- Riella alatospora
- Riella capensis
- Riella echinospora
- Riella purpureospora

== Pteridophytes ==
There are 58 pteridophyte species evaluated as data deficient.

=== Leptosporangiate ferns ===
There are 50 species in the class Polypodiopsida evaluated as data deficient.

==== Polypodiales ====
There are 42 species in the order Polypodiales evaluated as data deficient.

===== Dryopteridaceae =====
- Bolbitis aspleniifolia
- Elaphoglossum angulatum
- Elaphoglossum caespitosum
- Elaphoglossum cinereum
- Elaphoglossum ellipsoideum
- Elaphoglossum heteromorphum
- Elaphoglossum lasiolepium
- Elaphoglossum marginale
- Elaphoglossum pala
- Elaphoglossum pangoanum
- Elaphoglossum rupicolum
- Elaphoglossum subandinum
- Elaphoglossum subnudum
- Elaphoglossum tenerum
- Elaphoglossum trivittatum
- Elaphoglossum urbanii
- Elaphoglossum viscidulum

===== Polypodiaceae =====
- Grammitis recondita
- Oreogrammitis austroindica
- Polypodium argyrolepis
- Polypodium chionolepis
- Polypodium mixtum
- Polypodium piligerum
- Polypodium rimbachii
- Polypodium scutulatum

===== Blechnaceae =====
- Blechnum dendrophilum
- Blechnum petiolare
- Blechnum rimbachii
- Blechnum sociale

===== Tectariaceae =====
- Tectaria chimborazensis
- Tectaria morlae
- Tectaria quitensis
- Tectaria subrepanda
- Tectaria triloba

===== Other Polypodiales species =====
- Asplenium bifrons
- Asplenium congestum
- Cheilanthes laciniata
- Cyclosorus salicifolius
- Diplazium corderoi
- Diplazium eggersii
- Vittaria longipes

==== Hymenophyllales ====
- Hymenophyllum brachypus
- Hymenophyllum maderense, Madeira filmy fern
- Hymenophyllum refrondescens
- Hymenophyllum sodiroi
- Hymenophyllum trifidum
- Trichomanes melanopus
- Trichomanes tenuissimum

==== Cyatheales ====
- Cyathea cystolepis

=== Isoetopsida ===
- Isoetes brochonii
- Isoetes colombiana
- Isoetes divyadarshanii
- Isoetes eshbaughii
- Isoetes melanotheca
- Isoetes spinulospora
- Isoetes subinermis
- Isoetes udupiensis

== Gymnosperms ==
There are 20 species and 16 varieties of gymnosperm evaluated as data deficient.

=== Cycads ===
- Cycas glauca
- Cycas sphaerica
- Zamia oligodonta

=== Conifers ===
Species

- Cupressus duclouxiana, Yunnan cypress
- Cupressus funebris, Funereal cypress

Varieties

- Abies balsamea var. phanerolepis
- Abies homolepis var. umbellata
- Abies sachalinensis var. gracilis
- Abies sachalinensis var. nemorensis
- Juniperus chinensis var. tsukusiensis
- Juniperus convallium var. microsperma
- Juniperus pingii var. chengii
- Juniperus pingii var. miehei
- Picea koraiensis var. pungsanensis
- Picea likiangensis var. montigena
- Picea maximowiczii var. senanensis
- Pseudotsuga sinensis var. gaussenii
- Taxus cuspidata var. nana, Dwarf yew
- Torreya grandis var. jiulongshanensis
- Tsuga chinensis var. robusta

==== Podocarpaceae ====
- Podocarpus chingianus
- Podocarpus madagascariensis var. rotundus
- Podocarpus ramosii
- Podocarpus spathoides
- Podocarpus subtropicalis
- Retrophyllum piresii

=== Gnetopsida ===
- Ephedra brevifoliata
- Ephedra khurikensis
- Ephedra tilhoana
- Ephedra trifurcata
- Gnetum arboreum
- Gnetum catasphaericum
- Gnetum giganteum
- Gnetum gracilipes
- Gnetum loerzingii
- Gnetum ridleyi

== Dicotyledons ==
There are 1087 species, 17 subspecies, and 36 varieties of dicotyledon evaluated as data deficient.

=== Apiales ===
- Aphanopleura zangelanica, Zangelanian aphanopleura
- Bunium brevifolium
- Crepinella weberbaueri
- Daucus halophilus
- Dendropanax darienensis
- Dendropanax swartzii
- Heracleum scabrum, Scabrous cow-parsnip
- Heptapleurum apiculatum
- Heptapleurum wrayi
- Meryta drakeana
- Meryta mauruensis
- Meryta raiateensis
- Oenanthe conioides
- Oreopanax klugii
- Osmoxylon miquelii
- Pimpinella idae, Ida's burnet saxifrage
- Pittosporum coccineum
- Woodburnia penduliflora

=== Aquifoliales ===
==== Stemonuraceae ====
- Codiocarpus andamanicus
- Gomphandra oblongifolia
- Gomphandra pallida
- Gomphandra schoepfiifolia
- Gomphandra velutina
- Stemonurus dichrocarpus

=== Asterales ===
Species

- Achillea thracica
- Artemisia pancicii
- Baccharis eggersii
- Bothriocline congesta
- Centaurea fraylensis
- Centaurea kartschiana
- Centaurea rothmalerana
- Clibadium subsessilifolium
- Crepis sodiroi
- Crepis urundica
- Cyathomone sodiroi
- Dendrophorbium dielsii
- Echinops reticulatus
- Eclipta leiocarpa
- Eclipta prostrata
- Gnaphalium crispatulum
- Gnaphalium imbaburense
- Gynoxys corazonensis
- Gynoxys leiotheca
- Hebeclinium recreense
- Helianthus arizonensis
- Helianthus deserticola
- Helichrysum formosissimum
- Helichrysum sp. E
- Hieracium coloratum
- Hieracium hieronymi
- Hieracium schelkownikowii, Shelkovnikov's hawkweed
- Hieracium sprucei
- Hymenostemma pseudanthemis
- Hyoseris frutescens
- Hypochaeris stuebelii
- Klasea lycopifolia
- Lactuca longidentata
- Lactuca perennis, Blue lettuce
- Lactuca plumieri, Hairless blue-sow-thistle
- Launaea sp. A
- Leontopodium coreanum
- Leucomeris decora
- Mikania chimborazensis
- Mikania cuencana
- Olearia angulata
- Oligactis cusalaguensis, synonym of Sampera cusalaguensis
- Pilosella abakurae, Abakurian hawkweed
- Psephellus bagadensis, Bagadian centaury
- Psephellus eugenii, Eugeni's centaury
- Psephellus fajvuschii, Fayvush's centaury
- Pseudogynoxys chiribogensis
- Psilocarphus brevissimus
- Senecio antisanae
- Senecio iscoensis
- Sonchus macrocarpus
- Sonchus sosnowskyi, Sosnovskyi's sow-thistle
- Sphaeranthus samburuensis
- Sphaeranthus zavattarii
- Stevia dianthoidea
- Stevia tunguraguensis
- Tanacetum oltense, Oltuan tansy
- Taraxacum litophyllum
- Tragopogon fibrosus, Fibrous goat's beard
- Tripleurospermum heterolepis, Tripleurospermum
- Verbesina mameana

Subspecies

- Darwiniothamnus lancifolius subsp. lancifolius

=== Berberidopsidales ===
- Aextoxicon punctatum

=== Brassicales ===
There are 41 species in Capparales evaluated as data deficient.

==== Brassicaceae ====
- Alyssum akamasicum
- Alyssum pintodasilvae
- Arabis sadina
- Arabis scopoliana
- Armoracia macrocarpa
- Barbarea bosniaca, Bosnian yellow rocket
- Barbarea bracteosa
- Barbarea conferta
- Barbarea longirostris
- Barbarea macrophylla
- Barbarea sicula
- Barbarea verna, American cress
- Brassica cadmea
- Brassica incana
- Brassica oleracea
- Crambe grandiflora
- Crambe koktebelica
- Draba cacuminum
- Erysimum brachycarpum, Short-fruited treacle mustard
- Erysimum brevistylum, Short-styled treacle mustard
- Isatis allionii
- Isatis arenaria
- Isatis arnoldiana, Arnoldi's woad
- Isatis buschiorum, Bush's woad
- Isatis littoralis
- Isatis ornithorhynchus, Ornithorhynchous woad
- Isatis tomentella
- Isatis vermia
- Isatis villarsii
- Lepidium carrerasii
- Lepidium ramburei
- Lepidium syvaschicum
- Rorippa hispanica
- Sisymbrium confertum

==== Capparaceae ====
- Capparis crotonantha
- Capparis uniflora
- Maerua acuminata
- Maerua brunnescens
- Maerua de-waillyi
- Maerua scandens
- Steriphoma macranthum

==== Caricaceae ====
- Carica papaya, papaya

==== Moringaceae ====
- Moringa arborea

==== Tropaeolaceae ====
- Tropaeolum menispermifolium

=== Campanulales ===
- Burmeistera formosa
- Campanula calcarata, Limestone campanula
- Campanula lanata
- Lobelia limosa
- Lobelia quadrisepala
- Sphenoclea dalzielii, Wedgewort

=== Canellales ===
==== Canellaceae ====
- Cinnamodendron venezuelense

==== Winteraceae ====
- Drimys novoguineensis
- Zygogynum bosavicum
- Zygogynum cruminatum
- Zygogynum cyclopensis
- Zygogynum staufferianum

=== Caryophyllales ===
==== Cactus species ====
- Arrojadoa beateae
- Browningia amstutziae
- Browningia candelaris
- Browningia columnaris
- Cleistocactus ayopayanus
- Cleistocactus chrysocephalus
- Cleistocactus hystrix
- Cleistocactus luribayensis
- Cleistocactus morawetzianus
- Cleistocactus parapetiensis
- Cleistocactus plagiostoma
- Cleistocactus pungens
- Cleistocactus pycnacanthus
- Cleistocactus sextonianus
- Cleistocactus variispinus
- Cleistocactus viridiflorus
- Consolea picardae
- Corryocactus apiciflorus
- Corryocactus aureus
- Corryocactus quadrangularis
- Corryocactus serpens
- Corryocactus squarrosus
- Coryphantha kracikii
- Coryphantha retusa
- Cylindropuntia rosea
- Dendrocereus undulosus
- Echinocereus freudenbergeri
- Echinocereus klapperi
- Echinocereus metornii
- Echinocereus mombergerianus
- Echinocereus ortegae
- Echinocereus salm-dyckianus
- Echinocereus schereri
- Echinocereus subinermis
- Echinopsis arboricola
- Echinopsis chamaecereus
- Echinopsis clavata
- Echinopsis glauca
- Echinopsis hahniana
- Epiphyllum baueri
- Escobaria laredoi
- Escobaria lloydii
- Escobaria zilziana
- Espostoa superba
- Ferocactus schwarzii
- Frailea chiquitana
- Grusonia robertsii
- Gymnocalycium chiquitanum
- Hylocereus extensus
- Hylocereus tricae
- Hylocereus undatus, Dragon fruit
- Lophophora fricii
- Maihueniopsis archiconoidea
- Mammillaria backebergiana
- Mammillaria boelderliana
- Mammillaria duoformis
- Mammillaria ekmanii
- Mammillaria flavicentra
- Mammillaria gigantea
- Mammillaria guillauminiana – synonym of Mammillaria mercadensis
- Mammillaria halbingeri
- Mammillaria knippeliana
- Mammillaria linaresensis
- Mammillaria magnifica
- Mammillaria matudae
- Mammillaria meyranii
- Mammillaria morganiana
- Mammillaria painteri
- Mammillaria roseoalba
- Mammillaria sinistrohamata
- Mammillaria spinosissima
- Mammillaria variaculeata
- Mammillaria wagneriana
- Mammillaria wiesingeri
- Mammillaria xaltianguensis
- Matucana intertexta
- Melocactus bellavistensis
- Melocactus estevesii
- Melocactus praerupticola
- Neobuxbaumia sanchezmejoradae
- Neolloydia matehualensis
- Nopalea cochenillifera
- Nopalea dejecta, Spiny nopal
- Nopalea lutea
- Opuntia acaulis
- Opuntia aciculata
- Opuntia ficus-indica, Tuna cactus
- Opuntia jamaicensis
- Opuntia pittieri
- Opuntia sanguinea
- Opuntia scheeri
- Opuntia stenarthra
- Opuntia taylorii
- Opuntia velutina
- Ortegocactus macdougallii
- Pachycereus marginatus
- Parodia procera
- Pfeiffera asuntapatensis
- Pfeiffera boliviana
- Pfeiffera brevispina
- Pfeiffera crenata
- Pfeiffera miyagawae
- Pilosocereus albisummus
- Pilosocereus mollispinus
- Pilosocereus oligolepis
- Pilosocereus splendidus
- Pseudoacanthocereus sicariguensis
- Pseudorhipsalis lankesteri
- Rebutia neumanniana
- Rebutia pulvinosa
- Rhipsalis agudoensis
- Rhipsalis ewaldiana
- Rhipsalis hoelleri
- Rhipsalis sulcata
- Selenicereus chrysocardium
- Selenicereus nelsonii
- Selenicereus pteranthus, Princess of the night
- Stenocactus crispatus
- Stenocactus multicostatus
- Stenocactus obvallatus
- Stenocactus ochoterenianus
- Stenocactus phyllacanthus
- Stenocactus sulphureus
- Stenocactus vaupelianus
- Stenocereus eichlamii
- Thelocactus lausseri
- Tunilla erectoclada
- Tunilla microdisca
- Weberocereus rosei

==== Caryophyllaceae ====
Species

- Cerastium alsinifolium
- Dianthus andronakii, Andronaki's pink
- Dianthus lumnitzeri
- Dianthus moravicus, Moravian pink
- Dianthus serotinus
- Gypsophila takhtadzhanii, Takhtadjan's gypsophyla
- Minuartia armena, Armenian sandwort
- Minuartia daralagexica, Daralagezian sandwort
- Minuartia smejkalii
- Moehringia jankae
- Moehringia villosa
- Silene ikonnikovii, Ikonnikov's campion
- Silene syngei

Subspecies

- Spergularia media subsp. intermedia

==== Nepenthaceae ====
- Nepenthes alzapan
- Nepenthes anamensis
- Nepenthes mollis
- Nepenthes pilosa
- Nepenthes thorelii

==== Other Caryophyllales species ====
- Acantholimon gabrieljaniae, Gabrielyan's prickly-thrift
- Acantholimon vedicum, Vedian prickly thrift
- Amaranthus furcatus
- Armeria neglecta
- Atraphaxis teretifolia
- Beta hybrida
- Drosera elongata
- Limonium battandieri
- Montia biapiculata
- Polygonum cappadocium
- Polygonum peruvianum

=== Celastrales ===
- Elaeodendron kamerunense
- Salacia fimbrisepala
- Zinowiewia micrantha

=== Ceratophyllales ===
- Ceratophyllum tanaiticum

=== Dipsacales ===
- Viburnum maculatum, Orjenska hudika
- Viburnum mortonianum

=== Ericales ===
==== Balsaminaceae ====
- Impatiens pachycaulon

==== Clethraceae ====
- Clethra tutensis

==== Ebenaceae ====
- Diospyros arupaj
- Diospyros capricornuta
- Diospyros ebenum, Indian ebony
- Diospyros occulta
- Diospyros rumphii

==== Lecythidaceae ====
Species

- Allantoma kuhlmannii
- Allantoma pachyantha
- Allantoma uaupensis
- Eschweilera longirachis
- Eschweilera potaroensis

Subspecies

- Gustavia nana subsp. nana

==== Marcgraviaceae ====
- Marcgravia crassiflora
- Marcgravia polyadenia

==== Myrsinaceae ====
- Ardisia antonensis, synonym of Ardisia fendleri
- Ardisia chiriquiana
- Ardisia darienensis
- Ardisia geniculata
- Ardisia hagenii
- Ardisia scortechinii
- Embelia keniensis
- Gentlea vatteri
- Myrsine adamsonii
- Myrsine cheesemanii, Cook Islands myrsine
- Myrsine gracilissima
- Myrsine obovata
- Myrsine orohenensis
- Myrsine raiateensis
- Myrsine tahuatensis
- Parathesis bicolor
- Parathesis glaberima
- Parathesis panamensis
- Parathesis tenuifolia
- Stylogyne darienensis

==== Pentaphylacaceae ====
- Cleyera cernua

==== Primulaceae ====
- Androsace mathildae
- Myrsine falcata

==== Sapotaceae ====
- Madhuca cuprea
- Madhuca monticola
- Madhuca obtusifolia
- Palaquium edenii
- Palaquium ferrugineum
- Palaquium lisophyllum
- Pouteria chocoensis
- Pouteria peduncularis

==== Symplocaceae ====
- Symplocos iliaspaiensis
- Symplocos sousae

==== Theaceae ====
- Camellia grandibracteata
- Camellia grijsii
- Camellia leptophylla
- Camellia siangensis
- Camellia viridicalyx

=== Fabales ===
Species

- Abrus fruticulosus
- Acacia donaldii
- Acacia hirta
- Acacia schlechteri
- Aeschynomene angolensis
- Amphithalea bullata
- Anthyllis lemanniana
- Anthyllis lusitanica
- Aspalathus concava
- Astracantha oltensis, Oltuan astracantha
- Astragalus abnormalis
- Astragalus aquilanus
- Astragalus bosbutooensis
- Astragalus buschiorum
- Astragalus coarctatus
- Astragalus coelestis, Celestial milk vetch
- Astragalus cytisoides
- Astragalus ikonnikovii
- Astragalus imbricatus, Overlapping milk vetch
- Astragalus krascheninnikovii
- Astragalus langtangensis
- Astragalus leucophanus
- Astragalus orthocarpoides
- Astragalus paralurges
- Astragalus plebejus
- Astragalus pseudochlorostachys
- Astragalus retusifoliatus
- Astragalus sonamerensis
- Astragalus subalpinus
- Astragalus tscharynensis
- Astragalus voronovianus, Voronov's milk vetch
- Ateleia popenoei
- Brongniartia minima
- Bunchosia hartwegiana
- Bunchosia tutensis
- Byrsonima horneana
- Byrsonima ophiticola
- Byrsonima riparia
- Caesalpinia tortuosa
- Callerya sumatrana
- Calophaca soongorica
- Campylotropis argentea
- Campylotropis drummondii
- Caragana conferta
- Cercis griffithii
- Cercis orbiculata
- Chamaecrista boyanii
- Chamaecrista caracensis
- Crotalaria bakeriana
- Crotalaria corymbosa
- Crotalaria johannis
- Crotalaria limosa
- Crotalaria macrantha
- Crotalaria ovata
- Crotalaria pseudoquangensis
- Crotalaria schmitzii
- Crudia glauca
- Cytisus pulvinatus
- Dalbergia boniana
- Dalbergia ealaensis
- Dalbergia entadoides
- Dalbergia funera
- Dalbergia menoeides
- Dalbergia sambesiaca
- Desmodium subsecundum
- Dialium graciliflorum
- Dialium latifolium
- Dioclea schimpffii
- Eriosema benguellense
- Fordia nivea
- Genista angustifolia, Narrow-leaved genista
- Genista dorycnifolia
- Genista holopetala
- Genista parnassica
- Guibourtia sousae
- Hedysarum scoparium
- Humularia ledermannii
- Hydrochorea acreana
- Indigofera acanthinocarpa
- Indigofera ancistrocarpa
- Indigofera emmae
- Indigofera mwanzae
- Inga goniocalyx
- Kotschya oubanguiensis
- Leobordea prolifera
- Leptoderris mildbraedii
- Lespedeza thunbergii, Pink cascade
- Lessertia flanaganii
- Lessertia pappeana
- Leucochloron minarum
- Lotus borkouanus
- Lupinus foliolosus
- Lupinus kunthii (misspelt Lupinus kuntii)
- Lupinus michelianus
- Lupinus rupestris
- Lupinus smithianus
- Medicago heterocarpa
- Medicago tenderiensis, Yellow alfalfa
- Melilotus serratifolius
- Millettia fruticosa
- Millettia mossambicensis
- Millettia peguensis, Moulmein rosewood
- Millettia stenopetala
- Mimosa brachystachya
- Mimosa implexa
- Mimosa kuhlmannii
- Myrocarpus frondosus
- Ormosia assamica
- Ormosia cruenta
- Ornithopus uncinatus
- Oxytropis birirensis
- Oxytropis zemuensis
- Phaseolus harmsianus
- Poecilanthe parviflora
- Polygala limae
- Prosopis affinis
- Prosopis caldenia
- Prosopis nigra
- Psoralea arborea
- Pterocarpus dalbergioides, Andaman redwood
- Rhynchosia crispa
- Rhynchosia nitida
- Rhynchosia wellmaniana
- Sesbania concolor
- Sindora beccariana
- Sindora tonkinensis
- Sophora longipes
- Sophora rapaensis
- Strongylodon crassifolius
- Styphnolobium japonicum
- Swartzia macrophylla
- Tachigali tessmannii
- Tephrosia barbatala
- Tephrosia forrestiana
- Tephrosia pinifolia
- Tephrosia rechingeri
- Tephrosia seminole
- Tephrosia subnuda
- Trigonella falcata
- Vigna tisserantiana
- Xylia mendoncae
- Zornia quilonensis
- Zornia songeensis

Subspecies

- Sesbania coccinea subsp. atollensis

Varieties

- Butea monosperma var. lutea
- Lonchocarpus guatemalensis var. proteranthus

=== Fagales ===
There are 52 species, eight subspecies, and nine varieties in the order Fagales evaluated as data deficient.

==== Betulaceae ====
Species

- Alnus fauriei
- Alnus firma
- Alnus hakkodensis, Monkey class alder
- Alnus maximowiczii
- Alnus orientalis, Oriental alder
- Alnus serrulatoides
- Alnus sieboldiana
- Betula baschkirica
- Betula bomiensis
- Betula celtiberica
- Betula coriaceifolia
- Betula falcata
- Betula fargesii
- Betula honanensis
- Betula karagandensis
- Betula kotulae
- Betula medwediewii
- Betula potamophila
- Betula psammophila
- Betula saksarensis
- Betula saviczii
- Betula skvorsovii
- Betula sunanensis
- Betula tianschanica
- Betula wuyiensis
- Betula zinserlingii
- Carpinus dayongiana
- Carpinus eximia
- Carpinus faginea
- Carpinus japonica, Japanese hornbeam
- Carpinus laxiflora
- Carpinus lipoensis
- Carpinus luochengensis, Rochester hornbeam
- Carpinus mengshanensis
- Carpinus microphylla
- Carpinus omeiensis
- Carpinus paohsingensis
- Carpinus purpurinervis
- Carpinus rupestris
- Carpinus shimenensis, Shek Mun carpinus
- Corylus potaninii
- Corylus jacquemontii
- Corylus maxima
- Corylus potaninii
- Corylus wangii
- Corylus wulingensis

Subspecies

- Alnus glutinosa subsp. antitaurica
- Alnus glutinosa subsp. barbata
- Alnus jorullensis subsp. jorullensis
- Alnus jorullensis subsp. lutea
- Betula dahurica var. okuboi
- Betula pendula subsp. szechuanica, Sichuan birch
- Betula utilis subsp. albosinensis, Chinese red birch
- Betula utilis subsp. jacquemontii, Jacquemont birch
- Carpinus orientalis subsp. macrocarpa

Varieties

- Betula dahurica var. okuboi
- Betula pubescens var. litwinowii, Litwinow's birch
- Betula pubescens var. pumila
- Carpinus londoniana var. lanceolata, Hainan hornbeam
- Carpinus londoniana var. xiphobracteata
- Carpinus orientalis subsp. macrocarpa
- Carpinus polyneura var. polyneura, Multi-pulse hornbeam
- Carpinus polyneura var. sunpanensis, Songpan hornbeam
- Carpinus polyneura var. tsunyihensis, Zunyi hornbeam
- Corylus avellana var. pontica, Mediterranean hazel

==== Fagaceae ====
Species

- Castanopsis arietina
- Castanopsis castanicarpa
- Castanopsis echinophora
- Castanopsis griffithii
- Castanopsis harmandii
- Castanopsis longispina
- Castanopsis multiporcata
- Castanopsis siamensis
- Castanopsis symmetricupulata
- Castanopsis torulosa
- Castanopsis undulatifolia
- Lithocarpus acuminatus
- Lithocarpus ailaoensis
- Lithocarpus amherstianus
- Lithocarpus aspericupulus
- Lithocarpus bassacensis
- Lithocarpus bentramensis
- Lithocarpus bolovenensis
- Lithocarpus chittagongus
- Lithocarpus clathratus
- Lithocarpus corneri
- Lithocarpus cottonii
- Lithocarpus debaryanus
- Lithocarpus dolichostachys
- Lithocarpus guinieri
- Lithocarpus himalaicus
- Lithocarpus jenkinsii
- Lithocarpus kamengii
- Lithocarpus kemmaratensis
- Lithocarpus lithocarpaeus
- Lithocarpus magnificus
- Lithocarpus megastachyus
- Lithocarpus microbalanus
- Lithocarpus microlepis
- Lithocarpus milroyi
- Lithocarpus moluccus
- Lithocarpus oblancifolius
- Lithocarpus ollus
- Lithocarpus palungensis
- Lithocarpus parvulus
- Lithocarpus pierrei
- Lithocarpus rotundatus
- Lithocarpus rouletii
- Lithocarpus siamensis
- Lithocarpus tenuinervis
- Lithocarpus triqueter
- Quercus acherdophylla
- Quercus aerea
- Quercus alpescens
- Quercus barrancana
- Quercus breedloveana
- Quercus brenesii
- Quercus brevicalyx
- Quercus canariensis
- Quercus carduchorum
- Quercus centenaria
- Quercus chapensis
- Quercus chevalieri
- Quercus chrysocalyx
- Quercus coahuilensis
- Quercus coffeicolor
- Quercus conduplicans
- Quercus dalechampii
- Quercus deliquescens
- Quercus dongfangensis
- Quercus edwardsiae
- Quercus elevaticostata
- Quercus eumorpha
- Quercus fuliginosa
- Quercus ghiesbreghtii
- Quercus gomeziana
- Quercus gracilenta
- Quercus gracilior
- Quercus grahamii
- Quercus hartwissiana
- Quercus ignaciensis
- Quercus jinpinensis
- Quercus liaoi
- Quercus melissae
- Quercus mespilifolia
- Quercus mexiae
- Quercus ningangensis
- Quercus ningqiangensis
- Quercus opaca
- Quercus pauciradiata
- Quercus paxtalensis
- Quercus pentacycla
- Quercus perpallida
- Quercus platycalyx
- Quercus porphyrogenita
- Quercus protoroburoides
- Quercus rekonis
- Quercus robusta, Robust oak
- Quercus sarahmariae
- Quercus saravanensis
- Quercus shangxiensis
- Quercus shennongii
- Quercus shingjenensis
- Quercus supranitida
- Quercus tardifolia
- Quercus tarokoensis
- Quercus tatakaensis
- Quercus thorelii
- Quercus tinkhamii
- Quercus toumeyi
- Quercus toxicodendrifolia
- Quercus trinitatis
- Quercus tsinglingensis
- Quercus undata
- Quercus ungeri
- Quercus verde
- Quercus vestita
- Quercus xanthoclada
- Quercus yonganensis

==== Juglandaceae ====
- Juglans mexicana

==== Myricaceae ====
- Morella rotundata

=== Gentianales ===
==== Apocynaceae ====
- Ceropegia tourana
- Cynanchum leptostephanum
- Cynanchum leucophellum
- Cynanchum sodiroi
- Forsteronia pycnothyrsus
- Himatanthus stenophyllus
- Kopsia larutensis
- Kopsia profunda
- Kopsia scortechinii
- Sarcostemma socotranum, synonym of Cynanchum socotranum

==== Gentianaceae ====
- Fagraea carstensensis
- Gentianella anglica, early gentian

==== Loganiaceae ====
Species

- Geniostoma gagnae
- Geniostoma rarotongensis
- Strychnos chromatoxylon

Varieties

- Geniostoma hallei var. fatuivense
- Geniostoma hallei var. hallei
- Geniostoma hallei var. hivaoense

==== Rubiaceae ====
Species

- Breonia cuspidata
- Cephaelis peruviana
- Coprosma cookei
- Coprosma esulcata
- Coussarea klugii
- Diodia incana
- Exostema coriaceum
- Galium flaccidum
- Galium rhodopeum
- Hoffmannia modesta
- Ixora brevipedunculata
- Ixora marquesensis
- Ixora ooumuensis
- Ixora st.-johnii
- Ixora temehaniensis
- Ixora umbellata
- Kohautia socotrana
- Manettia herthae
- Manettia lilacina
- Manettia nubigena
- Manettia stenocalyx
- Morinda fasciculata
- Oldenlandia aretioides
- Oldenlandia sclerophylla
- Pavetta fascifolia
- Pentagonia rubiflora
- Prismatomeris kinabaluensis
- Psychotria acutiflora
- Psychotria adamsonii
- Psychotria congesta
- Psychotria cookei
- Psychotria cuneifolia
- Psychotria franchetiana
- Psychotria le-bronnecii
- Psychotria rhonhofiae
- Psychotria saloiana
- Psychotria tubuaiensis
- Randia pleiomeris
- Sabicea stenantha
- Spermacoce divaricata
- Spermacoce suberecta

Varieties

- Coprosma taitensis var. glabrata
- Coprosma taitensis var. oliveri
- Coprosma taitensis var. raiateensis

=== Icacinales ===
- Ryticaryum lucidum
- Ryticaryum rotundatum

=== Lamiales ===
==== Acanthaceae ====
- Ballochia amoena
- Ballochia atro-virgata
- Ballochia rotundifolia
- Blepharis torrei
- Dicliptera callichlamys
- Dicliptera quitensis
- Hygrophila barbata
- Hygrophila borellii
- Hygrophila laevis
- Hygrophila odora
- Hygrophila stagnalis
- Justicia bolomboensis
- Mellera menthiodora
- Physacanthus nematosiphon
- Ruellia dielsii
- Trichocalyx obovatus
- Trichocalyx orbiculatus

==== Gesneriaceae ====
- Aeschynanthus minutifolius
- Alloplectus herthae
- Besleria miniata
- Codonanthe erubenscens
- Damrongia integra
- Deinostigma poilanei
- Diastema sodiroanum
- Henckelia rotundata
- Napeanthus ecuadorensis
- Ornithoboea leptonema
- Ornithoboea multitorta
- Ornithoboea occulta
- Paraboea cochinchinensis
- Paraboea mahaxayana
- Paraboea robusta
- Paraboea strobilacea
- Paraboea thorelii
- Petrocosmea condorensis
- Petrocosmea formosa
- Petrocosmea umbelliformis
- Primulina semicontorta
- Ridleyandra latisepala

==== Lentibulariaceae ====
- Genlisea glandulosissima
- Utricularia bremii

==== Oleaceae ====
- Ligustrum pricei
- Olea maderensis
- Syringa josikaea

==== Plantaginaceae ====
- Callitriche bolusii
- Callitriche compressa
- Callitriche fassettii, Fassett's water-starwort
- Callitriche heteropoda
- Callitriche mouterdei
- Callitriche quindiensis
- Callitriche regis-jubae
- Callitriche stenoptera, Narrow-winged water-starwort
- Plantago malato-belizii

==== Scrophulariaceae ====
- Bonnayodes limnophiloides
- Buchnera bowalensis
- Dintera pterocaulis
- Limnophila diffusa
- Limnophila glandulifera
- Limnophila hayatae
- Limnophila helferi
- Limnophila polyantha
- Limnophila pulcherrima
- Limnophila siamensis
- Limnophila verticillata
- Limosella tenella
- Linaria coutinhoi
- Linaria ficalhoana
- Odontites hollianus
- Orobanche schelkovnikovii, Shelkovnikov's broom-rape
- Rhamphicarpa medwedewii
- Scrophularia herminii
- Scrophularia sublyrata
- Striga diversifolia
- Tozzia carpathica, Carpathian tozzia
- Verbascum purpureum
- Veronica euxina
- Veronica turrilliana

==== Other Lamiales species ====
- Cordia leucophlyctis
- Cordia scouleri
- Cordia tacarcunensis
- Echium candicans
- Galeopsis segetum, Downy hemp-nettle
- Glechoma hirsuta
- Heliotropium derafontense
- Heliotropium shoabense
- Lindernia khaoyaiensis
- Lindernia rivularis
- Lindernia succosa
- Myosotis lusitanica
- Myosotis retusifolia
- Myosotis schistosa, Cobble forget-me-not
- Nonea daghestanica, Dagestanian nonea
- Nuxia allorgeorum
- Nuxia sphaerocephala
- Onosma troodi
- Orthosiphon ruber
- Phlomis brevibracteata
- Phlomis cypria
- Plectranthus mafiensis
- Pogostemon crassicaulis
- Pogostemon quadrifolius
- Priva auricoccea
- Salvia lobbii
- Salvia sprucei
- Scutellaria insignis
- Symphytum ibericum, Georgian comfrey
- Tournefortia stenosepala
- Varronia anderssonii
- Verbena sedula
- Verbena townsendii, Townsend vervain
- Vitex heptaphylla

Varieties

- Verbena sedula var. darwinii
- Verbena sedula var. fournieri
- Verbena sedula var. sedula

=== Laurales ===
==== Hernandiaceae ====
- Hernandia drakeana
- Hernandia hammelii
- Hernandia tahitensis, synonym of Hernandia ovigera subsp. stokesii

==== Lauraceae ====
- Actinodaphne celebica
- Actinodaphne concolor
- Actinodaphne corymbosa
- Actinodaphne ferruginea
- Actinodaphne furfuracea
- Actinodaphne javanica
- Actinodaphne lanceolata
- Actinodaphne leiantha
- Actinodaphne macgregorii
- Actinodaphne mollis
- Actinodaphne moluccana
- Actinodaphne pedunculata
- Actinodaphne pisifera
- Actinodaphne reticulata
- Actinodaphne scleroptera
- Aiouea heteranthera
- Aiouea macedoana
- Alseodaphne himalayana
- Alseodaphne kochummenii
- Alseodaphne rubriflora
- Andea hueckii
- Aniba sulcata
- Aspidostemon lacrimans
- Beilschmiedia batangensis
- Beilschmiedia crassifolia
- Beilschmiedia cryptocaryoides
- Beilschmiedia danhkyi
- Beilschmiedia lancilimba
- Beilschmiedia muricata
- Beilschmiedia punctilimba
- Beilschmiedia reticulata
- Beilschmiedia robertsonii
- Beilschmiedia robynsiana
- Beilschmiedia rufoperulata
- Beilschmiedia sulcata
- Beilschmiedia superba
- Beilschmiedia supraglandulosa
- Beilschmiedia zapoteoides
- Chlorocardium rodiei, cogwood
- Cinnamomum alatum
- Cinnamomum alibertii
- Cinnamomum andersonii
- Cinnamomum angustifolium
- Cinnamomum asomicum
- Cinnamomum assamicum
- Cinnamomum bamoense
- Cinnamomum beccarii
- Cinnamomum blumei
- Cinnamomum calleryi
- Cinnamomum caratingae
- Cinnamomum carrierei
- Cinnamomum chantinii
- Cinnamomum decaisnei
- Cinnamomum decourtilzii
- Cinnamomum degeneri
- Cinnamomum gaudichaudii
- Cinnamomum grandiflorum
- Cinnamomum guyanense
- Cinnamomum hookeri
- Cinnamomum lanuginosum
- Cinnamomum ligneum
- Cinnamomum lineatum
- Cinnamomum martiniquense
- Cinnamomum nalingway
- Cinnamomum neesii
- Cinnamomum obscurum
- Cinnamomum ovalauense
- Cinnamomum pallidum
- Cinnamomum rigidum
- Cinnamomum rougierii
- Cinnamomum rumphii
- Cinnamomum sieboldii
- Cinnamomum spurium
- Cinnamomum suaveolens
- Cinnamomum subtetrapterum
- Cinnamomum vitiense
- Cinnamomum woulfei
- Cryptocarya austrokweichouensis
- Cryptocarya bitriplinervia
- Cryptocarya floydii
- Cryptocarya leiana
- Cryptocarya loureirii
- Cryptocarya panamensis
- Cryptocarya parinarifolia
- Cryptocarya procera
- Cryptocarya reticulata
- Cryptocarya roemeri
- Cryptocarya rubiginosa
- Dehaasia arunachalensis
- Dehaasia ferruginea
- Dehaasia hirsuta
- Dehaasia palembanica
- Dehaasia spectabilis
- Endiandra cuneata
- Endiandra eusideroxylocarpa
- Endiandra gem
- Endiandra introrsa
- Endiandra recurva
- Endiandra rigidior
- Endiandra tryphera
- Endlicheria argentea
- Endlicheria balsamea
- Endlicheria chrysovelutina
- Endlicheria goeldiana
- Endlicheria jefensis
- Endlicheria nilssonii
- Endlicheria paradoxa
- Endlicheria rubra
- Endlicheria tomentosa
- Licaria agglomerata
- Licaria camara
- Licaria deltoidea
- Licaria endlicheriifolia
- Licaria hirsuta
- Licaria mutisii
- Lindera wardii
- Litsea calophylla
- Litsea chengshuzhii
- Litsea cuttingiana
- Litsea grayana
- Litsea imthurnii
- Litsea liboshengii
- Litsea ovalis
- Litsea richii
- Litsea santapaui
- Litsea wallichii
- Machilus fruticosa
- Mezilaurus caatingae
- Mezilaurus manausensis
- Nectandra embirensis
- Nectandra furcata
- Nectandra impressa
- Nectandra matogrossensis
- Nectandra spicata
- Nectandra venulosa
- Nectandra weddellii
- Neolitsea gamblei
- Neolitsea umbrosa
- Ocotea albescens
- Ocotea amplissima
- Ocotea balanocarpa
- Ocotea barbellata
- Ocotea bijuga
- Ocotea brevipes
- Ocotea caesia
- Ocotea caniflora
- Ocotea caracasana
- Ocotea choquetangensis
- Ocotea clavigera
- Ocotea congestifolia
- Ocotea crassiramula
- Ocotea dussii
- Ocotea falcata
- Ocotea froesii
- Ocotea illustris
- Ocotea imazensis
- Ocotea inhauba
- Ocotea jefensis
- Ocotea keriana
- Ocotea killipii
- Ocotea leptophylla
- Ocotea lherminieri
- Ocotea ligulata
- Ocotea limae
- Ocotea loefgrenii
- Ocotea maranguapensis
- Ocotea maximilianea
- Ocotea megacarpa
- Ocotea obtusifolia
- Ocotea pausiaca
- Ocotea perrobusta
- Ocotea prunifolia
- Ocotea silvae
- Ocotea sinaiana
- Ocotea smithii
- Ocotea subalata
- Ocotea subtriplinervia
- Ocotea tovarensis
- Ocotea verapazensis
- Ocotea zoque
- Persea benthamiana
- Persea costata
- Persea filipes
- Persea fluviatilis
- Persea jariensis
- Persea julianae
- Persea negracotensis
- Persea purpusii
- Persea sessilis
- Persea sprucei
- Persea stricta
- Persea trollii
- Persea veraguasensis
- Phoebe javanica
- Phoebe pierrei
- Pleurothyrium brochidodromum
- Pleurothyrium pilosum
- Pleurothyrium racemosum
- Pleurothyrium triflorum
- Pleurothyrium undulatum
- Rhodostemonodaphne avilensis
- Rhodostemonodaphne curicuriariensis
- Rhodostemonodaphne leptoclada
- Rhodostemonodaphne ovatifolia
- Triadodaphne pachytepala
- Urbanodendron macrophyllum
- Yasunia quadrata

==== Monimiaceae ====
- Hedycarya denticulata
- Kibara sleumeri
- Matthaea philippinensis
- Mollinedia luizae
- Tambourissa bathiei
- Tambourissa mandrarensis

==== Siparunaceae ====
- Siparuna petasiformis

=== Magnoliales ===
==== Annonaceae ====
Species

- Alphonsea malayana
- Alphonsea philastreana
- Alphonsea sonlaensis
- Alphonsea ventricosa
- Annona annonoides
- Annona billbergii
- Annona burchellii
- Annona caput-medusae
- Annona ionophylla
- Annona iquitensis
- Annona mammifera
- Annona neoamazonica
- Annona neoelliptica
- Annona neovelutina
- Annona paraensis
- Annona pavonii
- Annona poeppigii
- Annona praetermissa
- Annona rigida
- Anonidium usambarense
- Cardiopetalum plicatum
- Cyathocalyx annamensis
- Cyathocalyx harmandii
- Cymbopetalum fosteri
- Cymbopetalum mirabile
- Cymbopetalum physaloides
- Dasymaschalon evrardii
- Dasymaschalon robinsonii
- Dasymaschalon tibetense
- Diclinanona matogrossensis
- Drepananthus olivaceus
- Duckeanthus grandiflorus
- Duguetia amplexifolia
- Duguetia aripuanae
- Duguetia dicholepidota
- Duguetia elliptica
- Duguetia oblanceolata
- Duguetia oblongifolia
- Duguetia reticulata
- Duguetia ruboides
- Duguetia schulzii
- Duguetia tenuis
- Duguetia vaupesana
- Friesodielsia maclellandii
- Froesiodendron longicuspe
- Froesiodendron urceocalyx
- Goniothalamus albiflorus
- Goniothalamus caloneurus
- Goniothalamus calycinus
- Goniothalamus chartaceus
- Goniothalamus cleistogamus
- Goniothalamus euneurus
- Goniothalamus gracilipes
- Goniothalamus holttumii
- Goniothalamus imbricatus
- Goniothalamus macranthus
- Goniothalamus multiovulatus
- Goniothalamus ninhianus
- Goniothalamus peduncularis
- Goniothalamus stenophyllus
- Goniothalamus subevenius
- Goniothalamus touranensis
- Goniothalamus viridiflorus
- Guatteria acrantha
- Guatteria alba
- Guatteria aliciae
- Guatteria alticola
- Guatteria amapaensis
- Guatteria anteridifera
- Guatteria araracuarae
- Guatteria auyantepuiensis
- Guatteria ayangannae
- Guatteria beniensis
- Guatteria bernardii
- Guatteria brevipetiolata
- Guatteria campinensis
- Guatteria capixabae
- Guatteria carchiana
- Guatteria castilloi
- Guatteria chasmantha
- Guatteria chrysophylla
- Guatteria clusiifolia
- Guatteria crassivenia
- Guatteria delicatula
- Guatteria denudata
- Guatteria dotana
- Guatteria elegans
- Guatteria elongata
- Guatteria emarginata
- Guatteria eriopoda
- Guatteria esmeraldae
- Guatteria eugeniifolia
- Guatteria flagelliflora
- Guatteria flexilis
- Guatteria grandipes
- Guatteria herrerana
- Guatteria japurensis
- Guatteria kamakusensis
- Guatteria leucotricha
- Guatteria megalocarpa
- Guatteria myriocarpa
- Guatteria narinensis
- Guatteria novogranatensis
- Guatteria oblonga
- Guatteria odorata
- Guatteria pachycarpa
- Guatteria pachyphylla
- Guatteria pakaraimae
- Guatteria pannosa
- Guatteria partangensis
- Guatteria peruviana
- Guatteria polyantha
- Guatteria pseudorotundata
- Guatteria reinaldii
- Guatteria rufotomentosa
- Guatteria sabuletorum
- Guatteria spectabilis
- Guatteria stenopetala
- Guatteria stenophylla
- Guatteria synsepala
- Guatteria tacarcunae
- Guatteria tenera
- Guatteria trichostemon
- Guatteria verruculosa
- Guatteria wokomungensis
- Guatteria zamorae
- Huberantha amoena
- Huberantha ceramensis
- Huberantha hirta
- Huberantha senjiana
- Klarobelia pandoensis
- Klarobelia peruviana
- Malmea guianensis
- Meiogyne oligocarpa
- Miliusa baillonii
- Miliusa glandulifera
- Miliusa macrocarpa
- Miliusa malnadensis
- Miliusa saccata
- Miliusa tristis
- Mitrephora phanrangensis
- Mitrephora poilanei
- Monoon bemban
- Monoon chloraxanthum
- Monoon costigerum
- Monoon obtusum
- Monoon oligocarpum
- Monoon pachyphyllum
- Mosannona guatemalensis
- Neo-uvaria parallelivenia
- Neostenanthera neurosericea
- Orophea acuminata
- Orophea chrysantha
- Orophea flagellaris
- Orophea kingiana
- Oxandra aberrans
- Oxandra bolivarensis
- Oxandra guianensis
- Phaeanthus intermedius
- Polyalthia angustissima
- Polyalthia bromantha
- Polyalthia corticosa
- Polyalthia endertii
- Polyalthia microsepala
- Polyalthia monocarpioides
- Polyalthia stenophylla
- Polyalthiopsis chinensis
- Polyceratocarpus angustifolius
- Polyceratocarpus laurifolius
- Popowia alata
- Popowia helferi
- Popowia papuana
- Popowia pauciflora
- Popowia perakensis
- Pseudephedranthus fragrans
- Pseudomalmea darienensis
- Pseudomalmea wingfieldii
- Pseudoxandra borbensis
- Pseudoxandra duckei
- Pseudoxandra pilosa
- Pseudoxandra revoluta
- Pseudoxandra rionegrensis
- Pseudoxandra williamsii
- Pseudoxandra xylopiifolia
- Pseuduvaria cerina
- Pseuduvaria hyadena
- Sageraea listeri
- Tetrameranthus guianensis
- Tetrameranthus macrocarpus
- Tetrameranthus trichocarpus
- Trigynaea flagelliflora
- Trigynaea lanceipetala
- Unonopsis cauliflora
- Unonopsis heterotricha
- Unonopsis megalosperma
- Unonopsis mexicana
- Unonopsis sericea
- Unonopsis silvatica
- Unonopsis umbilicata
- Uvariopsis citrata
- Uvariopsis globiflora
- Uvariopsis noldeae
- Xylopia acunae
- Xylopia amoena
- Xylopia annoniflora
- Xylopia chocoensis
- Xylopia conjungens
- Xylopia globosa
- Xylopia longicuspis
- Xylopia orinocensis
- Xylopia platypetala
- Xylopia rigidiflora
- Xylopia talbotii
- Xylopia unguiculata
- Xylopia uniflora
- Xylopia venezuelana
- Xylopia xylantha

Varieties

- Monodora junodii var. macrantha

==== Degeneriaceae ====
- Degeneria roseiflora

==== Magnoliaceae ====
- Magnolia angatensis
- Magnolia ashtonii
- Magnolia atlantida
- Magnolia azulensis
- Magnolia balansae
- Magnolia banghamii
- Magnolia bawangensis
- Magnolia beccarii
- Magnolia bintuluensis
- Magnolia braianensis
- Magnolia calophylloides
- Magnolia carnosa
- Magnolia caveana
- Magnolia championii
- Magnolia changhungtana
- Magnolia chevalieri, Southern peace lotus tree
- Magnolia chiriquiensis
- Magnolia clemensiorum
- Magnolia coco
- Magnolia compressa
- Magnolia dabieshanensis
- Magnolia dimorpha
- Magnolia doltsopa, Sweet michelia
- Magnolia duclouxii
- Magnolia elegans
- Magnolia elegantifolia
- Magnolia elfina
- Magnolia ernestii, Yellow lily-tree
- Magnolia fistulosa
- Magnolia floribunda
- Magnolia fragarigynandria
- Magnolia fulva
- Magnolia garrettii
- Magnolia gigantifolia
- Magnolia gloriensis
- Magnolia griffithii
- Magnolia guangdongensis
- Magnolia guangzhouensis
- Magnolia henryi
- Magnolia hookeri, Angkang white magnolia
- Magnolia hypolampra
- Magnolia iteophylla
- Magnolia jianfenglingensis
- Magnolia kaifui
- Magnolia kingii
- Magnolia kisopa
- Magnolia kobus, Kobushi magnolia
- Magnolia koordersiana
- Magnolia kwangtungensis
- Magnolia laevifolia
- Magnolia lamdongensis
- Magnolia lanuginosa
- Magnolia lanuginosoides
- Magnolia lasia
- Magnolia lawii
- Magnolia leveilleana
- Magnolia liliiflora
- Magnolia lopezobradorii
- Magnolia lozanoi
- Magnolia macklottii
- Magnolia macrocarpa
- Magnolia mariusjacobsia
- Magnolia masticata
- Magnolia mirifolia
- Magnolia montana
- Magnolia opipara
- Magnolia pahangensis
- Magnolia paranaensis
- Magnolia peruviana
- Magnolia philippinensis
- Magnolia praecalva
- Magnolia pterocarpa
- Magnolia punduana
- Magnolia sarawakensis
- Magnolia savegrensis
- Magnolia scortechinii
- Magnolia sellowiana, Sellow's magnolia
- Magnolia shirenshanensis
- Magnolia shizhenii
- Magnolia singapurensis
- Magnolia sphaerantha
- Magnolia steyermarkii
- Magnolia sumatrae
- Magnolia tarahumara
- Magnolia tsiampacca
- Magnolia utilis
- Magnolia venezuelensis
- Magnolia villosa
- Magnolia vrieseana
- Magnolia xiana
- Magnolia xianianhei
- Magnolia xinganensis
- Magnolia xinyangensis
- Magnolia yunnanensis
- Magnolia yuyuanensis
- Magnolia zamorana
- Magnolia zamudioi
- Magnolia zhengyiana

==== Myristicaceae ====
- Brochoneura dardainei
- Compsoneura racemosa
- Horsfieldia aruana
- Horsfieldia disticha
- Horsfieldia iriana
- Horsfieldia obtusa
- Horsfieldia pilifera
- Horsfieldia platantha
- Myristica atrescens
- Myristica atrocorticata
- Myristica brassii
- Myristica byssacea
- Myristica ensifolia
- Myristica flavovirens
- Myristica flosculosa
- Myristica fragrans, Nutmeg
- Myristica fugax
- Myristica fusiformis
- Myristica gracilipes
- Myristica inaequalis
- Myristica johnsii
- Myristica lepidota subsp. lepidota
- Myristica leptophylla
- Myristica neglecta
- Myristica pachycarpidia
- Myristica pilosella
- Myristica sarcantha
- Myristica schlechteri
- Myristica vinkeana
- Scyphocephalium chrysothrix
- Virola steyermarkii

=== Malpighiales ===
==== Calophyllaceae ====
- Calophyllum ceriferum
- Calophyllum dongnaiense
- Calophyllum hexapetalum
- Calophyllum leleanii
- Calophyllum lonchophyllum
- Calophyllum novoguineense
- Calophyllum praetermissum
- Calophyllum rugosum
- Calophyllum thuriferum
- Caraipa glabra
- Caraipa multinervia
- Caraipa odorata
- Haploclathra grandiflora
- Kayea coriacea
- Kayea daphnifolia
- Kayea macrophylla
- Kayea wrayi
- Kielmeyera altissima
- Kielmeyera divergens
- Mammea americana
- Mammea cauliflora
- Mammea papuana
- Marila domingensis
- Marila magnifica
- Marila saramaccana
- Mesua nivenii
- Mesua nuda

==== Chrysobalanaceae ====
- Acioa somnolens
- Atuna latifrons
- Couepia cidiana
- Couepia froesii
- Couepia glabra
- Couepia marleneae
- Couepia martini
- Couepia morii
- Couepia pernambucensis
- Couepia reflexa
- Couepia scottmorii
- Couepia stipularis
- Gaulettia steyermarkii
- Hirtella barrosoi
- Hirtella longifolia
- Hirtella orbicularis
- Hirtella scaberula
- Hirtella standleyi
- Hirtella subglanduligera
- Hymenopus hispidus
- Hymenopus miltonii
- Hymenopus pakaraimensis
- Kostermanthus malayanus
- Leptobalanus bullatus
- Leptobalanus joseramosii
- Leptobalanus mexicanus
- Licania apiknae
- Licania aracaensis
- Licania bahiensis
- Licania caldasiana
- Licania compacta
- Licania crassivenia
- Licania cyathodes
- Licania ferreirae
- Licania furfuracea
- Licania hitchcockii
- Licania marleneae
- Licania maxima
- Licania monteagudensis
- Licania nelsonii
- Licania roraimensis
- Licania santosii
- Licania stricta
- Licania teixeirae
- Licania trigonioides
- Moquilea anneae
- Moquilea chiriquiensis
- Moquilea maranhensis
- Moquilea montana
- Moquilea palcazuensis
- Moquilea silvatica
- Moquilea vasquezii
- Parinari cardiophylla
- Parinari insularum
- Parinari prancei

==== Clusiaceae ====
- Arawakia angustata, synonym of Arawakia weddelliana
- Arawakia caputmonsia, synonym of Arawakia weddelliana
- Arawakia panamaea, synonym of Arawakia weddelliana
- Chrysochlamys membrillensis
- Clusia alainii
- Clusia asymmetrica
- Clusia brongniartiana
- Clusia carachensis
- Clusia cassinioides
- Clusia cochlanthera
- Clusia duartei
- Clusia engleriana
- Clusia gaudichaudii
- Clusia guaviarensis
- Clusia minutiflora
- Clusia multilineata
- Clusia odorata
- Clusia perscariosa
- Clusia pseudochina
- Clusia pseudohavetia
- Clusia rosiflora
- Clusia subsessilis
- Clusia tetrandra
- Clusia troncosii
- Garcinia amabilis
- Garcinia assamica
- Garcinia balimensis
- Garcinia bonii
- Garcinia branderhorstii
- Garcinia calycina
- Garcinia cambodgiensis
- Garcinia choisyiana
- Garcinia crassinervis
- Garcinia dalleizettei
- Garcinia dallmannensis
- Garcinia delpyana
- Garcinia heterandra
- Garcinia jelinckii
- Garcinia keenania
- Garcinia klossii
- Garcinia kydia
- Garcinia longifolia
- Garcinia magnophylla
- Garcinia mammeoides
- Garcinia mangostana
- Garcinia mangostifera
- Garcinia microstigma
- Garcinia microtropidiiformis
- Garcinia moszkowskii
- Garcinia moulmeinensis
- Garcinia nigricans
- Garcinia oreophila
- Garcinia pachyantha
- Garcinia pachypetala
- Garcinia pallida
- Garcinia pallide-sanguinea
- Garcinia petiolaris
- Garcinia pullei
- Garcinia ramulosa
- Garcinia rheedei
- Garcinia rupestris
- Garcinia sampitana
- Garcinia schlecbteri
- Garcinia sopsopia
- Garcinia spectabilis
- Garcinia squamata
- Garcinia stigmacantha
- Garcinia teysmanniana
- Garcinia torensis
- Garcinia tuberculata
- Garcinia umbellulata
- Garcinia umbonata
- Garcinia valetoniana
- Garcinia versteegii
- Garcinia viridiflora
- Garcinia wollastonii
- Moronobea candida
- Tovomita albiflora
- Tovomita atropurpurea
- Tovomita auriculata
- Tovomita calodictyos
- Tovomita clarkii
- Tovomita clusiiflora
- Tovomita colombiana
- Tovomita divaricata
- Tovomita duckei
- Tovomita fanshawei
- Tovomita gazelii
- Tovomita hopkinsii
- Tovomita longirostrata
- Tovomita morii
- Tovomita nidiae
- Tovomita rubella
- Tovomita tenuiflora
- Tovomita trojitana
- Tovomita turbinata
- Tovomita vismiifolia
- Tovomitopsis faucis
- Tovomitopsis membrillensis
- Tovomitopsis saldanhae

==== Euphorbiaceae ====
Species

- Caryodendron angustifolium
- Croton jamesonii
- Euphorbia bruntii
- Euphorbia caput-aureum
- Euphorbia exilispina
- Euphorbia fuscolanata
- Euphorbia galapageia
- Euphorbia hexadenia
- Euphorbia leptoclada
- Euphorbia mainiana
- Euphorbia neobosseri
- Euphorbia ramofraga
- Euphorbia razafinjohanyi
- Euphorbia schweinfurthii
- Euphorbia stapfii
- Euphorbia tardieuana
- Excoecaria indica
- Pera aperta

Varieties

- Euphorbia milii var. hislopii
- Euphorbia milii var. longifolia
- Euphorbia milii var. milii
- Euphorbia milii var. splendens
- Euphorbia milii var. tenuispina
- Euphorbia milii var. tulearensis
- Euphorbia neobosseri var. itampolensis
- Euphorbia neobosseri var. neobosseri
- Euphorbia tetraptera var. robusta

==== Phyllanthaceae ====
Species

- Chonocentrum cyathophorum
- Glochidion andersonii
- Glochidion atrovirens
- Glochidion azaleon
- Glochidion bachmaense
- Glochidion brideliifolium
- Glochidion brooksii
- Glochidion brothersonii
- Glochidion bullatissimum
- Glochidion calciphilum
- Glochidion celastroides
- Glochidion dasystylum
- Glochidion decorum
- Glochidion elaphrocarpum
- Glochidion frodinii
- Glochidion gaudichaudii
- Glochidion goniocarpum
- Glochidion grayanum
- Glochidion helferi
- Glochidion huahineense
- Glochidion karnaticum
- Glochidion kunstlerianum
- Glochidion lancisepalum
- Glochidion maingayi
- Glochidion mop
- Glochidion nobile
- Glochidion orohenense
- Glochidion paludicola
- Glochidion phellocarpum
- Glochidion pleiosepalum
- Glochidion podocarpum
- Glochidion punctatum
- Glochidion retinerve
- Glochidion stylosum
- Glochidion timorense
- Glochidion trusanicum
- Glochidion varians
- Glochidion xestophyllum
- Hieronyma clusioides
- Meineckia filipes
- Phyllanthus albizzioides
- Phyllanthus atalotrichus
- Phyllanthus casearioides
- Phyllanthus collinsiae
- Phyllanthus fadyenii
- Phyllanthus frodinii
- Phyllanthus helenae
- Phyllanthus houailouensis
- Phyllanthus insulae-japen
- Phyllanthus lasiogynus
- Phyllanthus longeramosus
- Phyllanthus macrophyllus
- Phyllanthus meuieensis
- Phyllanthus prainianus
- Phyllanthus rhodocladus
- Phyllanthus salomonis
- Phyllanthus stenophyllus
- Phyllanthus tessmannii

Subspecies

- Phyllanthus nutans subsp. grisebachianus

==== Salicaceae ====
- Populus nigra

==== Other Malpighiales ====
Species

- Cassipourea obovata
- Cassipourea swaziensis
- Linum dolomiticum
- Ochna angustata
- Ochna beirensis
- Ouratea patelliformis
- Rumex balcanicus

Varieties

- Symphonia globulifera var. angustifolia

=== Malvales ===
==== Dipterocarpaceae ====
Species

- Dipterocarpus scaber
- Hopea aptera
- Hopea dasyrrhachis
- Hopea latifolia
- Hopea ovoidea
- Hopea paucinervis
- Monotes glandulosus
- Monotes xasenguensis
- Parashorea buchananii
- Parashorea dussaudii
- Parashorea smythiesii
- Vatica bella
- Vatica chevalieri
- Vatica cinerea
- Vatica griffithii
- Vatica harmandiana
- Vatica lanceifolia
- Vatica palungensis
- Vatica ridleyana

==== Other Malvales ====
Species

- Abelmoschus manihot
- Apeiba intermedia
- Brownlowia argentata
- Cola clavata
- Cola usambarensis
- Daphne altaica
- Daphne arbuscula
- Daphnopsis zamorensis
- Durio wyatt-smithii
- Elaeocarpus homalioides
- Glyphaea tomentosa
- Grewia goetzeana
- Grewia transzambesica
- Hampea dukei
- Hibiscus dioscorides
- Hibiscus macropodus
- Melhania milleri
- Pseudobombax argentinum
- Pseudobombax guayasense
- Pseudobombax millei
- Quararibea santaritensis
- Tahitia vescoana

Varieties

- Elaeocarpus calomala var. villosiusculus

=== Myrtales ===
==== Myrtaceae ====
Species

- Allosyncarpia ternata
- Archirhodomyrtus beckleri
- Asteromyrtus arnhemica
- Backhousia subargentea
- Calycolpus andersonii
- Calytrix achaeta
- Calytrix exstipulata
- Campomanesia cucullata
- Campomanesia prosthecesepala
- Decaspermum parvifolium
- Eucalyptus abdita
- Eucalyptus ancophila
- Eucalyptus angularis
- Eucalyptus annuliformis
- Eucalyptus aquatica
- Eucalyptus calyerup
- Eucalyptus canobolensis
- Eucalyptus castrensis
- Eucalyptus conveniens
- Eucalyptus copulans
- Eucalyptus crispata
- Eucalyptus cuspidata
- Eucalyptus depauperata
- Eucalyptus elliptica
- Eucalyptus famelica
- Eucalyptus forresterae
- Eucalyptus grisea
- Eucalyptus hypostomatica
- Eucalyptus kenneallyi
- Eucalyptus lateritica
- Eucalyptus leprophloia
- Eucalyptus limitaris
- Eucalyptus luteola
- Eucalyptus medialis, synonym of Eucalyptus hebetifolia
- Eucalyptus microschema
- Eucalyptus paedoglauca
- Eucalyptus paralimnetica
- Eucalyptus phoenix
- Eucalyptus placita
- Eucalyptus pleurocorys
- Eucalyptus pruiniramis
- Eucalyptus pyrenea
- Eucalyptus quinniorum
- Eucalyptus redimiculifera
- Eucalyptus retinens
- Eucalyptus surgens
- Eugenia agasthiyamalayana
- Eugenia albida
- Eugenia aloysii
- Eugenia ampla
- Eugenia ardisioides
- Eugenia augustana
- Eugenia badia
- Eugenia bahiana
- Eugenia breviracemosa
- Eugenia bullatifolia
- Eugenia callichroma
- Eugenia capixaba
- Eugenia cartagensis
- Eugenia coaetanea
- Eugenia columbiensis
- Eugenia consolatae
- Eugenia culta
- Eugenia darcyi
- Eugenia dentata
- Eugenia dinklagei
- Eugenia dipetala
- Eugenia dulcis
- Eugenia elongata
- Eugenia fluminensis
- Eugenia funkiana
- Eugenia illepida
- Eugenia impressa
- Eugenia itahypensis
- Eugenia laxa
- Eugenia librevillensis
- Eugenia longibracteata
- Eugenia ludoviciana
- Eugenia mcphersonii
- Eugenia memecylifolia
- Eugenia meridensis
- Eugenia micropora
- Eugenia myriantha
- Eugenia oaxacana
- Eugenia ocanensis
- Eugenia pachakumachiana
- Eugenia percincta
- Eugenia pia
- Eugenia poiteaui
- Eugenia praestigiosa, synonym of Syzygium praestigiosum
- Eugenia praeterita
- Eugenia producta
- Eugenia pubescens
- Eugenia quadriovulata
- Eugenia robustior
- Eugenia roseola
- Eugenia rostadonis, synonym of Syzygium rostadonis
- Eugenia rufidula
- Eugenia salomonica
- Eugenia seithurensis
- Eugenia sericifolia
- Eugenia serraegrandis
- Eugenia shettyana
- Eugenia solimoensis
- Eugenia sooiana
- Eugenia squamiflora
- Eugenia stenosepaloides
- Eugenia sturrockii
- Eugenia tachirensis
- Eugenia tenuiflora
- Eugenia tonii
- Eugenia triflora
- Eugenia tungo
- Eugenia turneri
- Eugenia undulata
- Eugenia uninervia
- Eugenia vanderveldei
- Eugenia veraguensis
- Eugenia vilersii
- Eugenia yasuniana
- Eugenia zeyheri, synonym of Eugenia capensis subsp. zeyheri
- Gossia longipetiolata
- Gossia scottiana
- Leptospermum madidum, synonym of Aggreflorum longifolium
- Lithomyrtus cordata
- Lithomyrtus retusa
- Lophostemon grandiflorus
- Lophostemon lactifluus
- Melaleuca argentea
- Melaleuca bracteata
- Melaleuca citrolens
- Melaleuca dealbata
- Melaleuca glomerata
- Melaleuca groveana
- Melaleuca lasiandra
- Melaleuca leucadendra
- Melaleuca minutifolia
- Melaleuca sericea
- Melaleuca stenostachya
- Metrosideros gregoryi
- Metrosideros regelii
- Myrceugenia bocaiuvensis
- Myrceugenia decussata
- Myrcia albobrunnea
- Myrcia amoena
- Myrcia atrorufa
- Myrcia badia
- Myrcia biptera
- Myrcia breviflora
- Myrcia caesariata
- Myrcia calyptrata
- Myrcia carinata
- Myrcia clausa
- Myrcia concinna
- Myrcia corticosa
- Myrcia cymatophylla
- Myrcia directa
- Myrcia ensiformis
- Myrcia galanoana
- Myrcia gentryi
- Myrcia gonini
- Myrcia hintonii
- Myrcia hydrophila
- Myrcia induta
- Myrcia irregularis
- Myrcia liesneri
- Myrcia lilloi
- Myrcia macrocarpa
- Myrcia maculata
- Myrcia mathewsiana
- Myrcia mayarensis
- Myrcia melanophylla
- Myrcia multiglomerata
- Myrcia myriantha
- Myrcia neooreophila
- Myrcia neorostrata
- Myrcia neotovarensis
- Myrcia platyphylla
- Myrcia protracta
- Myrcia pseudomoaensis
- Myrcia pteropoda
- Myrcia rubiginosa
- Myrcia sessiliflora
- Myrcia ventuarensis
- Myrcia yaraensis
- Myrcianthes minimifolia
- Myrcianthes sessilis
- Myrciaria cordata
- Myrciaria puberulenta
- Neomitranthes regeliana
- Octamyrtus glomerata
- Plinia ambivalens
- Plinia anonyma
- Plinia coclensis
- Plinia coronata
- Plinia darienensis
- Plinia delicata
- Plinia gentryi
- Plinia humaitana
- Plinia moaensis
- Plinia oblongata
- Plinia pauciflora
- Plinia pumila
- Plinia rufiflora
- Plinia salamancana
- Plinia sessiliflora
- Plinia subavenia
- Plinia tapuruquarana
- Plinia valenciana
- Psidium gaudichaudianum
- Psidium inaequilaterum
- Psidium itanareense
- Psidium langsdorffii
- Psidium sintenisii
- Psidium subrostrifolium
- Psidium ubatubense
- Rhodamnia australis
- Rhodomyrtus mengenensis
- Syzygium abatakum
- Syzygium aborense
- Syzygium acutatum
- Syzygium aksornae
- Syzygium altecastaneum
- Syzygium alutaceum
- Syzygium amplexicaule
- Syzygium angophoroides
- Syzygium angustovatum
- Syzygium anisopetalum
- Syzygium armstrongii
- Syzygium blumei
- Syzygium brachyanthelium
- Syzygium brachybotryum
- Syzygium brachypodum
- Syzygium calyptrocalyx
- Syzygium capituliferum
- Syzygium caroli
- Syzygium caryophylloides
- Syzygium cauliflorum
- Syzygium cephalophorum
- Syzygium cleistocalyx
- Syzygium combretiflorum
- Syzygium comosum
- Syzygium concinnum
- Syzygium confertiflorum
- Syzygium confusum
- Syzygium conicum
- Syzygium cruriflorum
- Syzygium cuneatum
- Syzygium decoriflorum
- Syzygium dictyoneurum
- Syzygium dielsianum
- Syzygium dolichorhynchum
- Syzygium dolichostylum
- Syzygium dubium
- Syzygium duplomarginatum
- Syzygium eucalyptoides
- Syzygium eximiiflorum
- Syzygium eymae
- Syzygium fibrosum
- Syzygium finisterrae
- Syzygium flavidum
- Syzygium fluvicola
- Syzygium fraternum
- Syzygium fulvotomentosum
- Syzygium ganophyllum
- Syzygium garcinioides
- Syzygium gladiatum
- Syzygium glaucissimum
- Syzygium gracilipaniculum
- Syzygium graeffei
- Syzygium gyrostemoneum
- Syzygium heloanthum
- Syzygium idrisii
- Syzygium ignambiense
- Syzygium imperiale
- Syzygium jainii
- Syzygium kalahiense
- Syzygium keroanthum
- Syzygium ketambense
- Syzygium korthalsii
- Syzygium lagerstmemioides
- Syzygium lambirense
- Syzygium lamprophyllum
- Syzygium lanceolarium
- Syzygium lanceolatum
- Syzygium laurifolium
- Syzygium lehuntii
- Syzygium lenbrassii
- Syzygium leucocladum
- Syzygium lunduense
- Syzygium macromyrtus
- Syzygium manii
- Syzygium melanostictum
- Syzygium meorianum
- Syzygium merokense
- Syzygium minus
- Syzygium minutuliflorum
- Syzygium mishmiense
- Syzygium monetarium
- Syzygium nicobaricum
- Syzygium nitrasirirakii
- Syzygium nummularium
- Syzygium occlusum
- Syzygium odoardoi
- Syzygium orthoneurum
- Syzygium ovale
- Syzygium oxyphyllum
- Syzygium pachyanthum
- Syzygium palodense
- Syzygium paradoxum
- Syzygium peekelii
- Syzygium perspicuinervium
- Syzygium petraeum
- Syzygium petrophilum
- Syzygium phacelanthum
- Syzygium phengklaii
- Syzygium phryganodes
- Syzygium pilgerianum
- Syzygium piluliferum
- Syzygium platycarpum
- Syzygium polyphlebium
- Syzygium pontianakense
- Syzygium pseudomolle
- Syzygium pullei
- Syzygium purpuricarpum
- Syzygium pyrrophloeum
- Syzygium quadrialatum
- Syzygium quadricostatum
- Syzygium ramosissimum
- Syzygium randianum
- Syzygium rechingeri
- Syzygium remotifolium
- Syzygium retinervium
- Syzygium riparium
- Syzygium rubens
- Syzygium salignum
- Syzygium sambiranense
- Syzygium sanjappanum
- Syzygium schlechteri
- Syzygium scolopophyllum
- Syzygium scytophyllum
- Syzygium silamense
- Syzygium sriganesanii
- Syzygium stenurum
- Syzygium subcapitulatum
- Syzygium subcrenatum
- Syzygium subfalcatum
- Syzygium subhorizontale
- Syzygium subnodosum
- Syzygium suborbiculare
- Syzygium subsessilifolium
- Syzygium subsimile
- Syzygium synaptoneurum
- Syzygium tenuilimbum
- Syzygium tesselatum
- Syzygium thomsenii
- Syzygium timorianum
- Syzygium tolypanthum
- Syzygium treubii
- Syzygium tricolor
- Syzygium tringiense
- Syzygium triste
- Syzygium utilis
- Syzygium valdepunctatum
- Syzygium villiferum
- Syzygium virescens
- Syzygium vismioides
- Syzygium warburgii
- Tristaniopsis musa-amanii
- Tristaniopsis oreophila
- Uromyrtus nekouana
- Uromyrtus novoguineensis
- Uromyrtus rostrata
- Verticordia cunninghamii
- Verticordia verticillata
- Xanthomyrtus montis-sucklingii
- Xanthomyrtus ovata
- Xanthostemon eucalyptoides
- Xanthostemon paradoxus
- Xanthostemon psidioides
- Xanthostemon umbrosus

Varieties

- Terminalia glabrata var. haroldii

==== other Myrtales ====
- Astronidium ovalifolium
- Conostegia grisebachii
- Dissotis bussei
- Graffenrieda phoenica
- Graffenrieda robusta
- Ludwigia brenanii
- Lythrum anatolicum
- Memecylon sessilicarpum
- Terminalia hararensis
- Tessmannianthus cereifolius
- Topobea induta
- Topobea parvifolia

=== Nymphaeales ===
- Barclaya motleyi
- Nymphaea divaricata
- Nymphaea sulphurea

=== Oxalidales ===
==== Cunoniaceae ====
- Geissois trifoliolata
- Schizomeria orthophlebia
- Spiraeanthemum ellipticum
- Weinmannia dzieduszyckii
- Weinmannia magnifolia
- Weinmannia rhoifolia
- Weinmannia testudineata

==== Other Oxalidales ====
- Ellipanthus madagascariensis
- Oxalis simplex

=== Piperales ===
Species

- Peperomia aphanoneura
- Peperomia buxifolia
- Peperomia discifolia
- Peperomia involucrata
- Piper candollei
- Piper distigmatum
- Piper san-miguelense

Varieties

- Piper lucigaudens var. alleni

=== Podostemales ===
- Apinagia fluitans
- Cladopus austrosinensis
- Cladopus fallax
- Cussetia carinata
- Cussetia diversifolia
- Dalzellia angustissima
- Dalzellia kailarsenii
- Dalzellia ubonensis
- Hanseniella smitinandii
- Hydrobryum kaengsophense
- Hydrobryum khaoyaiense
- Hydrobryum minutale
- Hydrobryum phetchabunense
- Hydrobryum somranii
- Hydrobryum tardhuangense
- Ledermanniella abbayesii
- Ledermanniella adamesii
- Ledermanniella musciformis
- Ledermanniella pygmaea
- Ledermanniella tenuifolia
- Macropodiella macrothyrsa
- Polypleurum longistylosum
- Polypleurum phuwuaense
- Polypleurum prachinburiense
- Polypleurum sisaketense
- Saxicolella flabellata
- Stonesia fascicularis
- Stonesia gracilis
- Stonesia heterospathella
- Terniopsis ramosa

=== Ranunculales ===
- Adonis distorta
- Aquilegia kitaibelii
- Aquilegia nigricans, Bulgarian columbine
- Berberis chillacochensis
- Berberis farinosa
- Berberis hirtellipes
- Berberis hyperythra
- Berberis laidivo
- Berberis lechleriana
- Berberis maderensis
- Berberis papillosa
- Berberis pavoniana
- Berberis pectinata
- Berberis reicheana
- Berberis saxorum
- Berberis schwerinii
- Berberis simonsii
- Coscinium fenestratum
- Meliosma cordata
- Pulsatilla slavica, Slovak pasque flower
- Pulsatilla subslavica, Intermediate pasque flower
- Ranunculus bangii
- Ranunculus fontanus
- Ranunculus ololeucos
- Ranunculus polyphyllus
- Tinospora mossambicensis

=== Rosales ===
==== Moraceae ====
- Artocarpus altilis
- Bleekrodea insignis
- Broussonetia harmandii
- Ficus anastomosans
- Ficus aurantiacifolia
- Ficus aureobrunnea
- Ficus aureocordata
- Ficus auricoma
- Ficus calcicola
- Ficus caloneura
- Ficus calyculata
- Ficus carinata
- Ficus cavronii
- Ficus dalbertisii
- Ficus decipiens
- Ficus dissipata
- Ficus flagellaris
- Ficus floresana
- Ficus glabristipulata
- Ficus gryllus
- Ficus guayaquilensis
- Ficus halmaherae
- Ficus herthae
- Ficus hotteana
- Ficus illiberalis
- Ficus immanis
- Ficus involucrata
- Ficus juglandiformis
- Ficus machupicchuensis
- Ficus manuselensis
- Ficus pachysycia
- Ficus porrecta
- Ficus quichauensis
- Ficus rheedei
- Ficus ridleyana
- Ficus saurauioides
- Ficus scaposa
- Ficus subcaudata
- Ficus subglabritepala
- Ficus tenuicuspidata
- Ficus travancorica
- Ficus tunicata
- Ficus vallis-caucae
- Ficus venezuelensis
- Ficus zuliensis
- Morus indica
- Morus nigra
- Naucleopsis jamariensis

==== Rhamnaceae ====
- Alphitonia carolinensis
- Colubrina cubensis
- Frangula darienensis
- Frangula dianthes
- Frangula grandiflora
- Frangula lindeniana
- Frangula pedunculata
- Frangula sphaerosperma
- Sarcomphalus crenatus
- Scutia colombiana
- Ziziphus melastomoides
- Ziziphus mistol
- Ziziphus pubescens subsp. glabra

==== Rosaceae ====
- Amygdalus susakensis
- Cotoneaster karatavicus
- Crataegus ambigua
- Malus crescimannoi
- Malus dasyphylla, paradise apple
- Malus florentina
- Malus hupehensis, Chinese crab apple
- Malus sylvestris, crab apple
- Potentilla emilii-popi
- Potentilla silesiaca
- Prunus argentea
- Prunus armeniaca
- Prunus brigantina, Briançon apricot
- Prunus canescens
- Prunus cerasifera
- Prunus concinna
- Prunus domestica
- Prunus fenzliana
- Prunus herthae
- Prunus klokovii
- Prunus maritima
- Prunus odorata
- Prunus tenella
- Pyrus asia-mediae
- Pyrus castribonensis
- Pyrus chosrovica, Khosrovian pear
- Pyrus hakkiarica
- Pyrus sicanorum
- Pyrus vallis-demonis
- Rosa abutalybovii, Abutalybov's brier
- Rosa hracziana, Hrachi's rose
- Rosa isaevii, Issayev's brier
- Rosa jaroshenkoi, Yaroshenko's brier
- Rosa sjunikii, Syunikian rosa
- Sibiraea altaiensis
- Sorbaria olgae
- Sorbus teodori
- Sorbus turkestanica
- Sorbus velebitica

==== Other Rosales species ====
- Celtis planchoniana, synonym of Celtis glabrata
- Cecropia maxonii
- Greyia flanaganii
- Metatrophis margaretae
- Pilea topensis
- Rhamnidium caloneurum
- Ulmus glabra
- Ulmus minor
- Urtica kioviensis, Kievan nettle

=== Santalales ===
- Balanophora wilderi
- Ochanostachys amentacea

=== Sapindales ===
There are 33 species, one subspecies, and one variety in the order Sapindales evaluated as data deficient.

==== Rutaceae ====
Species

- Balsamocitrus camerunensis
- Vepris allenii
- Zanthoxylum integrifoliolum

Varieties

- Phellodendron amurense var. wilsonii

==== Anacardiaceae ====
- Astronium urundeuva
- Haplorhus peruviana
- Mangifera acutigemma
- Mangifera bullata
- Mangifera collina
- Mangifera hiemalis
- Mangifera indica
- Mangifera lalijiwa
- Mangifera odorata
- Mangifera persiciformis
- Mangifera rubropetala
- Mangifera taipa
- Melanochyla borneensis
- Ozoroa namaquensis
- Parishia dinghouiana
- Pentaspadon motleyi
- Schinus engleri
- Schinus pearcei

==== Meliaceae ====
- Aglaia cucullata, Pacific maple
- Toona calantas

==== Sapindaceae ====
- Allophylus marquesensis, synonym of Allophylus timoriensis
- Allophylus rapensis
- Eriocoelum oblongum
- Haplocoelopsis africana
- Serjania pteleifolia
- Zollingeria dongnaiensis

==== Other Sapindales ====
Species

- Canarium liguliferum
- Malacocarpus crithmifolius
- Protium attenuatum
- Zygophyllum kaschgaricum

Subspecies

- Acer caesium subsp. caesium, Indian maple

=== Saxifragales ===
- Crassula elatinoides
- Corylopsis pauciflora
- Liquidambar multinervis
- Liquidambar poilanei
- Paeonia officinalis subsp. banatica
- Saxifraga cintrana
- Sedum bracteatum
- Sempervivum ermanicum, Ermanian houseleek

=== Solanales ===
Species

- Cestrum micans
- Cestrum quitense
- Grabowskia sodiroi
- Iochroma brevistamineum
- Ipomoea batatas, sweet potato
- Nymphoides guineensis
- Seddera pedunculata
- Sessea brasiliensis
- Solanum betaceum, tamarillo
- Solanum burtonii
- Solanum chrysasteroides
- Solanum chrysophyllum
- Solanum cremastanthemum
- Solanum densepilosulum
- Solanum edmonstonei
- Solanum loxense, synonym of Solanum aureum
- Solanum ternifolium

Varieties

- Cuscuta kilimanjari var. rukararana

=== Violales ===
- Casearia albicans
- Casearia flexula
- Casearia lasiophylla
- Cistus palhinhae
- Hydnocarpus kurzii
- Lacistema lucidum
- Passiflora telesiphe
- Scolopia oreophila
- Turnera triglandulosa
- Viola paradoxa
- Xylosma glaberrima
- Xylosma ruiziana

=== Vitales ===
- Cyphostemma auriculatum, Eared cyphostemma

== Monocotyledons ==
=== Alismatales ===
==== Hydrocharitaceae ====
- Blyxa hexandra
- Blyxa javanica
- Blyxa quadricostata
- Blyxa senegalensis
- Blyxa vietii
- Halophila euphlebia
- Halophila sulawesii
- Lagarosiphon hydrilloides
- Lagarosiphon rubellus
- Najas baldwinii
- Najas hagerupii
- Najas welwitschii
- Ottelia balansae
- Ottelia brachyphylla
- Ottelia exserta
- Ottelia verdickii

==== Other Alismatales species ====
- Alisma gramineum, Ribbon-leaved water-plantain
- Aponogeton appendiculatus
- Aponogeton robinsonii
- Halodule beaudettei
- Halodule bermudensis
- Halodule ciliata
- Halodule emarginata
- Lepilaena australis
- Lepilaena marina
- Ranalisma rostrata
- Ruppia filifolia
- Sagittaria tengtsungensis

=== Arales ===
==== Araceae ====
- Alocasia lecomtei
- Amorphophallus echinatus
- Amorphophallus hayi
- Anthurium albidum
- Anthurium albispatha
- Anthurium anceps
- Anthurium atroviride
- Anthurium bimarginatum
- Anthurium brittonianum
- Anthurium cachabianum
- Anthurium camposii
- Anthurium canaliculatum
- Anthurium candolleanum
- Anthurium clathratum
- Anthurium conspicuum
- Anthurium conterminum
- Anthurium cordulatum
- Anthurium cuspidiferum
- Anthurium dendrobates
- Anthurium exstipulatum
- Anthurium fraseri
- Anthurium fuscopunctatum
- Anthurium gaffurii
- Anthurium geniculatum
- Anthurium glaucophyllum
- Anthurium hastifolium
- Anthurium julospadix
- Anthurium latemarginatum
- Anthurium lineolatum
- Anthurium macrolonchium
- Anthurium masfense
- Anthurium myosurus
- Anthurium navasii
- Anthurium nicolasianum
- Anthurium nitens
- Anthurium obovatum
- Anthurium occidentale
- Anthurium oreodoxum
- Anthurium orientale
- Anthurium parambae
- Anthurium pellucidopunctatum
- Anthurium pirottae
- Anthurium plantagineum
- Anthurium plurisulcatum
- Anthurium polyneuron
- Anthurium polyphlebium
- Anthurium psilostachyum
- Anthurium quinquesulcatum
- Anthurium radiatum
- Anthurium resectum
- Anthurium rhizophorum
- Anthurium rhodorhizum
- Anthurium riofrioi
- Anthurium rupestre
- Anthurium sagittale
- Anthurium sagittellum
- Anthurium septuplinervium
- Anthurium spathulifolium
- Anthurium stenoglossum
- Anthurium striolatum
- Anthurium subtruncatum
- Anthurium sulcatum
- Anthurium tenuispica
- Anthurium tonianum
- Anthurium treleasei
- Anthurium vestitum
- Anthurium vomeriforme
- Cryptocoryne annamica
- Cryptocoryne loeiensis
- Cryptocoryne mekongensis
- Cryptocoryne vietnamensis
- Culcasia orientalis
- Dieffenbachia herthae
- Philodendron chimboanum
- Philodendron gualeanum
- Philodendron pachycaule
- Philodendron validinervium
- Rhaphidophora laichauensis
- Rhodospatha dammeri
- Rhodospatha dissidens
- Rhodospatha robusta
- Rhodospatha statutii
- Stenospermation brachypodum
- Stenospermation interruptum
- Stenospermation peripense
- Stenospermation subellipticum
- Typhonium vermiforme

==== Lemnaceae ====
- Wolffiella repanda

=== Arecales ===
- Areca andersonii
- Areca chaiana
- Areca glandiformis
- Areca guppyana
- Areca macrocarpa
- Areca riparia
- Attalea septuagenata
- Bactris charnleyae
- Bactris sphaerocarpa
- Calamus latispinus
- Calamus scabrispathus
- Clinostigma haerestigma
- Clinostigma savoryanum (Note: Listed by IUCN as Clinostigma savoryana.), Arrack tree
- Coccothrinax concolor
- Coccothrinax inaguensis
- Corypha macropoda
- Corypha umbraculifera
- Cyrtostachys kisu
- Daemonorops binnendijkii
- Daemonorops schlechteri
- Drymophloeus lepidotus
- Drymophloeus oliviformis
- Drymophloeus pachycladus
- Drymophloeus subdistichus
- Dypsis ankaizinensis
- Dypsis canescens
- Dypsis commersoniana
- Dypsis henrici
- Dypsis heteromorpha
- Dypsis ligulata
- Dypsis lucens
- Dypsis monostachya
- Dypsis plumosa
- Dypsis plurisecta
- Dypsis soanieranae
- Dypsis thouarsiana
- Dypsis tsaratananensis
- Hydriastele hombronii
- Hyphaene macrosperma
- Licuala polyschista
- Licuala steinii
- Livistona tonkinensis
- Oenocarpus makeru
- Oenocarpus simplex
- Physokentia dennisii
- Pinanga forbesii
- Pritchardia elliptica
- Pritchardia woodfordiana
- Raphia australis, Giant palm
- Raphia longiflora
- Raphia palma-pinus
- Raphia sudanica, Northern raphia
- Rhopaloblaste elegans
- Satakentia liukiuensis
- Trithrinax brasiliensis

=== Asparagales ===
==== Amaryllidaceae ====
- Allium aethusanum
- Allium bornmuelleri
- Allium breviradium
- Allium calamarophilon
- Allium chamaespathum
- Allium chrysonemum
- Allium circinatum
- Allium ericetorum
- Allium favosum
- Allium gomphrenoides
- Allium heldreichii
- Allium horvatii
- Allium hymettium
- Allium incensiodorum
- Allium insubricum
- Allium integerrimum
- Allium kermesinum
- Allium koenigianum, Koenig's onion
- Allium lehmannii
- Allium lopadusanum
- Allium luteolum
- Allium macedonicum
- Allium marschalianum
- Allium meteoricum
- Allium narcissiflorum
- Allium obtusiflorum
- Allium palentinum
- Allium parciflorum
- Allium parnassicum
- Allium pendulinum, Italian garlic
- Allium permixtum
- Allium phthioticum
- Allium pilosum
- Allium podolicum
- Allium pruinatum
- Allium scaberrimum
- Allium scythicum
- Allium talijevii
- Allium vasilevskajae, Vasilevskaya's onion
- Galanthus elwesii
- Galanthus gracilis
- Narcissus jonquilla

==== Asparagaceae ====
- Asparagus littoralis
- Asparagus pseudoscaber
- Dracaena bueana
- Dracaena rubroaurantiaca
- Drimia porphyrostachys
- Scilla litardierei
- Scilla lochiae
- Scilla odorata

==== Asphodelaceae ====
- Aloe benishangulana
- Aloe bertemariae
- Aloe canarina
- Aloe comosa, Clanwilliam aloe
- Aloe crassipes
- Aloe jacksonii
- Aloe khamiesensis, Namaqua aloe
- Aloe orlandi
- Aloe rubrodonta
- Aloe welmelensis
- Aloe weloensis
- Eremurus kopet-daghensis

==== Iridaceae ====
- Calydorea luteola
- Crocus boissieri
- Gladiolus palustris
- Iris assadiana
- Iris auranitica
- Iris basaltica
- Iris lusitanica
- Iris marsica
- Iris mesopotamica, Mesopotamian iris
- Iris yebrudii
- Mastigostyla candaravensis

==== Orchidaceae ====
- Acianthera bicarinata
- Aeranthes moratii
- Amitostigma parceflorum
- Angraecum aloifolium
- Angraecum tenellum
- Anoectochilus koshunensis, Jewel orchid
- Appendicula fasciculata
- Appendicula negrosiana
- Appendicula polyantha
- Bipinnula polysyka
- Brachycorythis wightii
- Bulbophyllum amblyacron
- Bulbophyllum aspersum
- Bulbophyllum coweniorum, Cowen's bulbophyllum
- Bulbophyllum falcifolium
- Bulbophyllum gilgianum
- Bulbophyllum globulosum
- Bulbophyllum stabile
- Calanthe albolutea
- Campylocentrum spannagelii
- Catasetum globiflorum, Spheroid-flowered catasetum
- Ceratostylis scariosa
- Cymbidium chloranthum
- Cynorkis crispa
- Dendrobium hornei
- Dendrobium isochiloides
- Dendrobium sarcodes
- Dracula antonii
- Dracula ligiae, Ligia's dracula
- Epipactis dunensis, Dune helleborine
- Eria parviflora
- Eulophia ecristata, Giant orchid
- Eulophia parilamellata
- Glomera latipetala
- Glomera subeciliata
- Gymnadenia borealis, Heath fragrant orchid
- Habenaria christianii
- Habenaria jaguariahyvae
- Habenaria villosa
- Kraenzlinella gigantea
- Lepanthes applanata
- Lepanthes erythrocles
- Masdevallia gargantua
- Mormodes auriculata
- Notylia inversa
- Oberonia mindorensis
- Octomeria rodeiensis
- Pelexia sceptrum
- Phragmipedium brasiliense, Brazilian phragmipedium
- Phreatia alpina
- Platanthera zothecina, Alcove bog orchid
- Pleurothallis elegantula, Elegant pleurothallis
- Pleurothallis miniatolineolata
- Polystachya brugeana
- Polystachya lukwangulensis
- Sarcoglottis veyretiae
- Triphora amazonica

==== Other Asparagales species ====
- Hypoxis malaissei

=== Bromeliales ===
- Aechmea candida, White bromeliad
- Aechmea geminiflora
- Aechmea pimenti-velosoi
- Billbergia cardenasii
- Bromelia sylvicola
- Dyckia braunii
- Dyckia secunda
- Guzmania barbiei
- Lindmania savannensis
- Lindmania sessilis
- Navia scirpiflora
- Navia scopulorum
- Neoregelia seideliana
- Orthophytum sucrei
- Pitcairnia juzepczukii
- Puya laccata
- Tillandsia atroviolacea
- Vriesea melgueiroi
- Vriesea sagasteguii

=== Commelinales ===
- Aneilema mortonii
- Commelina bella
- Floscopa axillaris
- Palisota congolana
- Wachendorfia thyrsiflora

=== Dioscoreales ===
- Dioscorea nana
- Dioscorea orizabensis
- Dioscorea wightii
- Narthecium balansae

=== Liliales ===
==== Liliaceae ====
- Fritillaria graeca
- Fritillaria gussichiae
- Fritillaria montana
- Gagea anisopoda
- Gagea chabertii, Chabert's gagea
- Gagea extremadurensis, Estremadure gagea
- Gagea gymnopoda
- Gagea heldreichii, Heldreich's gagea
- Gagea juliae, Julia's gagea
- Gagea lusitanica
- Gagea micrantha, Small-flowered gagea
- Gagea pampaninii, Pampanini's gagea
- Gagea procera, Giant gagea
- Gagea pseudopeduncularis, Long-pedicelled gagea
- Gagea tenuissima, Thinnest gagea
- Lilium jankae

==== Other Liliales species ====
- Bomarea borjae

=== Pandanales ===
Species

- Dicranopygium goudotii
- Pandanus parvicentralis
- Pandanus teuszii

Varieties

- Pandanus tectorius var. uapensis

=== Poales ===
==== Cyperaceae ====
Species

- Bolboschoenus novae-angliae, Saltmarsh bulrush
- Bulbostylis trabeculata
- Carex adelostoma, Circumpolar sedge
- Carex bullata, Button sedge
- Carex heleonastes, Hudson Bay sedge
- Carex laeviconica, Smoothcone sedge
- Carex lapponica, Lapland sedge
- Carex laxa, Weak sedge
- Carex macrostigmatica
- Carex melanorrhyncha, Astragal radde
- Carex motuoensis
- Carex sodiroi
- Carex tsushimensis
- Cyperus altomicroglumis
- Cyperus baoulensis
- Cyperus kasamensis
- Cyperus koyaliensis
- Cyperus microbolbos
- Cyperus remotus
- Cyperus wissmannii
- Eleocharis columbiensis
- Eleocharis cubangensis
- Eleocharis onthitensis
- Eleocharis schlechteri
- Eleocharis swamyi
- Eleocharis wadoodii
- Fimbristylis psammocola
- Kyllinga jubensis
- Kyllinga oblonga
- Lipocarpha raynaleana
- Lipocarpha reddyi
- Mapania tonkinensis
- Pycreus demangei
- Schoenoplectiella proxima
- Schoenoplectiella saximontana, Rocky mountain clubrush
- Scirpus naikianus
- Scleria poklei

Subspecies

- Pycreus flavescens subsp. tanaensis

Varieties

- Carex cognata var. congolensis

==== Eriocaulaceae ====
- Eriocaulon baramaticum
- Eriocaulon koynense
- Eriocaulon longipetalum
- Eriocaulon mbalensis
- Eriocaulon meiklei

==== Juncaceae ====
- Juncus subulitepalus
- Luzula johnstonii
- Rostkovia tristanensis

==== Poaceae ====
- Agrostis goughensis
- Andropogon bentii
- Aristida anaclasta
- Avena volgensis
- Bromus grossus
- Bromus moesiacus
- Dactyloctenium hackelii
- Deschampsia maderensis
- Deschampsia robusta
- Deschampsia wacei
- Digitaria duthieana
- Digitaria patagiata
- Digitaria sacculata
- Fargesia albocerea
- Fargesia exposita
- Fargesia mairei
- Festuca duriotagana
- Glyceria spicata
- Hitchcockella baronii
- Ischaemum sp.
- Lepturus calcareus
- Lepturus pulchellus
- Merostachys rondoniensis
- Microstegium tenue
- Phyllostachys carnea
- Phyllostachys guizhouensis
- Poa kunthii
- Polypogon schimperianus
- Pseudechinolaena tenuis
- Pseudosclerochloa kengiana
- Puccinellia ciliata
- Stipa gegarkunii, Gegarkunian feather-grass
- Stipa leptogluma

==== Xyridaceae ====
- Xyris bampsii
- Xyris densa
- Xyris gossweileri
- Xyris imitatrix
- Xyris kundelungensis
- Xyris kwangolana
- Xyris lejolyanus
- Xyris popeana
- Xyris sanguinea

=== Zingiberales ===
==== Heliconiaceae ====
- Heliconia flabellata
- Heliconia willisiana

==== Zingiberaceae ====
Species

- Alpinia platylopha
- Alpinia velutina
- Amomum chevalieri
- Amomum dealbatum
- Amomum echinocarpum
- Amomum gagnepainii
- Amomum glabrum
- Amomum longipetiolatum
- Amomum schlechteri
- Amomum sericeum
- Amomum subulatum
- Amomum verum
- Curcuma ornata
- Elettariopsis sumatrana
- Pleuranthodium pterocarpum
- Zingiber ligulatum
- Zingiber zerumbet

Varieties

- Amomum tomrey var. stenophyllum
- Amomum villosum var. xanthioides

== See also ==
- Lists of IUCN Red List data deficient species
- List of least concern plants
- List of near threatened plants
- List of vulnerable plants
- List of endangered plants
- List of critically endangered plants
- List of recently extinct plants
