= Solanum aureum =

Scientific classification
- Kingdom: Plantae
- Clade: Tracheophytes
- Clade: Angiosperms
- Clade: Eudicots
- Clade: Asterids
- Order: Solanales
- Family: Solanaceae
- Genus: Solanum
- Species: S. aureum

Binomial name
- Solanum aureum Humb. & Bonpl. ex Dunal

Synonyms
- Solanum clematideum Bitter; Solanum loxense Humb. & Bonpl. ex Dunal

Species of plant

Solanum aureum is a species of flowering plant in the family Solanaceae, native to Colombia, Ecuador and Peru. It was first described in 1816.
