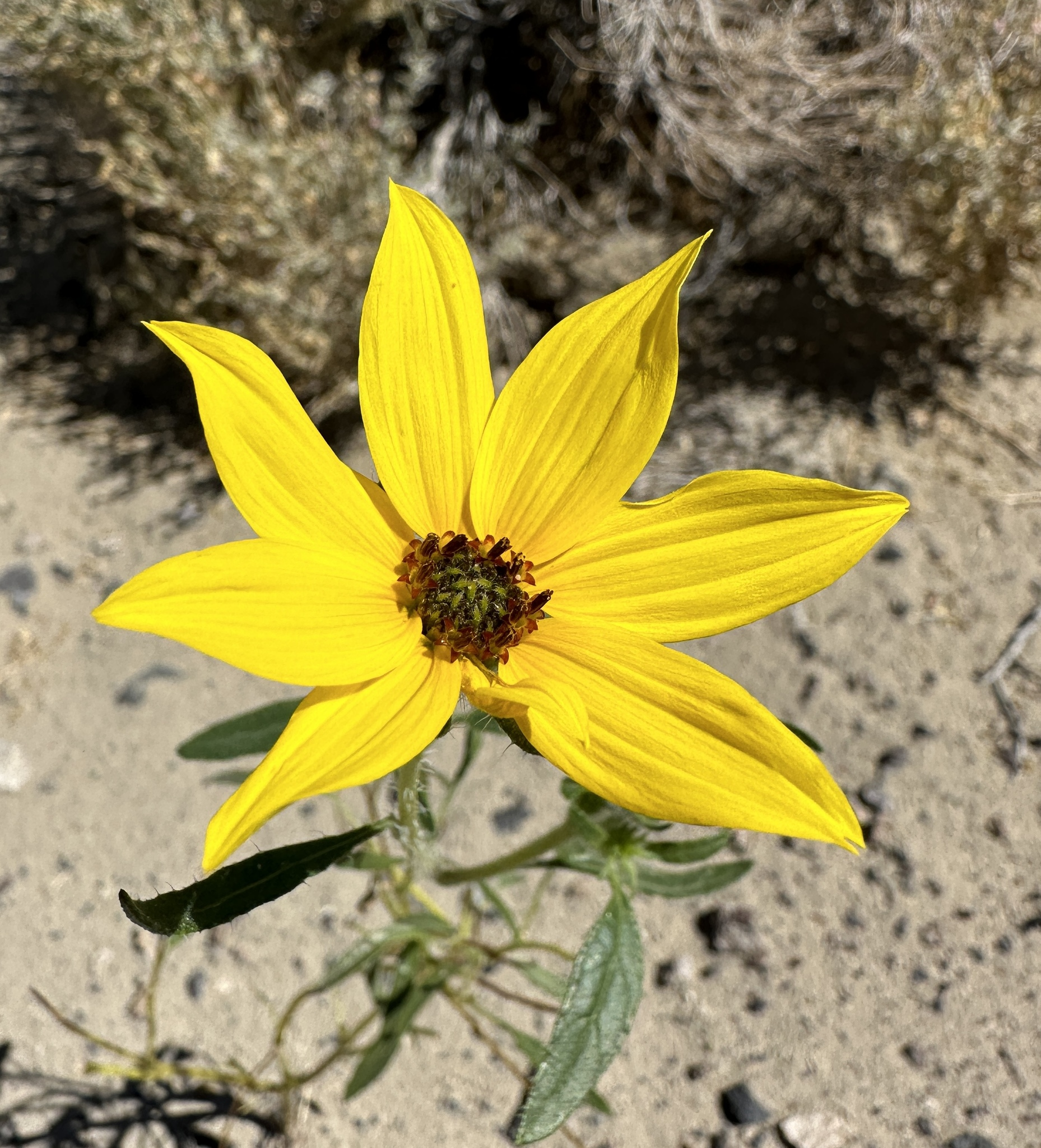

Conservation status
- Data Deficient (IUCN 3.1)

Scientific classification
- Kingdom: Plantae
- Clade: Tracheophytes
- Clade: Angiosperms
- Clade: Eudicots
- Clade: Asterids
- Order: Asterales
- Family: Asteraceae
- Tribe: Heliantheae
- Genus: Helianthus
- Species: H. deserticola

Binomial name
- Helianthus deserticola Heiser

Synonyms
- Helianthus deserticolus Heiser

= Helianthus deserticola =

Species of sunflower

Helianthus deserticola, the desert sunflower, is a plant species native to Arizona, Nevada and Utah. It grows in dry, sun-lit locations at elevations of 400–1,500 m (1,300–4,900 ft).

Helianthus deserticola is a daughter species of the species Helianthus annuus and Helianthus petiolaris.

Helianthus deserticola is an annual herb up to 40 centimetres (16 in) tall with abundant resin dots on the foliage. Leaves are up to 5 centimetres (2.0 in) long. Flower heads contain approximately 7-13 ray flowers and more than 25 disc flowers.
