= Parathesis glaberima =

Conservation status
- Data Deficient (IUCN 2.3)

Scientific classification
- Kingdom: Plantae
- Clade: Tracheophytes
- Clade: Angiosperms
- Clade: Eudicots
- Clade: Asterids
- Order: Ericales
- Family: Primulaceae
- Genus: Parathesis
- Species: P. glaberima

Binomial name
- Parathesis glaberima Lundell

Species of flowering plant

Parathesis glaberima is a species of plant in the family Primulaceae. It is endemic to Panama.
