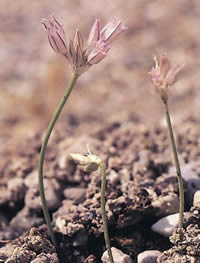

Conservation status
- Vulnerable (IUCN 3.1)

Scientific classification
- Kingdom: Plantae
- Clade: Tracheophytes
- Clade: Angiosperms
- Clade: Monocots
- Order: Asparagales
- Family: Amaryllidaceae
- Subfamily: Allioideae
- Genus: Allium
- Species: A. calamarophilon

Binomial name
- Allium calamarophilon Phitos & Tzanoud.

= Allium calamarophilon =

Euboea pixie onion

Species of flowering plant

Allium calamarophilon is a species of plant in the genus Allium. It is endemic to Greece, known only from one small population on the Island of Euboea, on a rocky ledge in the center of the island near the town of Kimi. Its natural habitats are Mediterranean-type shrubby vegetation and rocky shores. It is threatened by habitat loss.

Allium calamarophilon is a very small plant with a short, slender scape barely 12 cm tall. Leaves are lanceolate. Umbel contains 5-8 white or pink flowers with dark midstripes along each of the tepals.
