= Capparis crotonantha =

Conservation status
- Data Deficient (IUCN 2.3)

Scientific classification
- Kingdom: Plantae
- Clade: Tracheophytes
- Clade: Angiosperms
- Clade: Eudicots
- Clade: Rosids
- Order: Brassicales
- Family: Capparaceae
- Genus: Capparis
- Species: C. crotonantha

Binomial name
- Capparis crotonantha Standl.

Species of flowering plant

Capparis crotonantha is a species of plant in the Capparaceae family. It is endemic to Panama.
