= Cyperus koyaliensis =

Scientific classification
- Kingdom: Plantae
- Clade: Tracheophytes
- Clade: Angiosperms
- Clade: Monocots
- Clade: Commelinids
- Order: Poales
- Family: Cyperaceae
- Genus: Cyperus
- Species: C. koyaliensis

Binomial name
- Cyperus koyaliensis Cherm.

Species of plant native to Africa

Cyperus koyaliensis is a species of sedge found in Africa, having been registered in Cameroon, Ivory Coast, Guinea, Liberia, Sierra Leone, Nigeria and the Central African Republic.

The species was first formally described by the botanist Henri Chermezon in 1936.

== See also ==
- List of Cyperus species
