= Magnolia changhungtana =

Conservation status
- Data Deficient (IUCN 3.1)

Scientific classification
- Kingdom: Plantae
- Clade: Embryophytes
- Clade: Tracheophytes
- Clade: Spermatophytes
- Clade: Angiosperms
- Clade: Magnoliids
- Order: Magnoliales
- Family: Magnoliaceae
- Genus: Magnolia
- Species: M. changhungtana

Binomial name
- Magnolia changhungtana Noot.

Synonyms
- Manglietia pachyphylla H.T.Chang

Species of flowering plant

Magnolia changhungtana is a species of flowering plant named by Hans Peter Nooteboom in 2008. It is a tree native to Guizhou and Guangdong provinces in southern China.
