= Phaseolus harmsianus =

Conservation status
- Data Deficient (IUCN 3.1)

Scientific classification
- Kingdom: Plantae
- Clade: Tracheophytes
- Clade: Angiosperms
- Clade: Eudicots
- Clade: Rosids
- Order: Fabales
- Family: Fabaceae
- Subfamily: Faboideae
- Genus: Phaseolus
- Species: P. harmsianus

Binomial name
- Phaseolus harmsianus Diels

Species of legume

Phaseolus harmsianus is a species of legume in the family Fabaceae. It is found only in Ecuador. Its natural habitat is subtropical or tropical moist montane forests.
