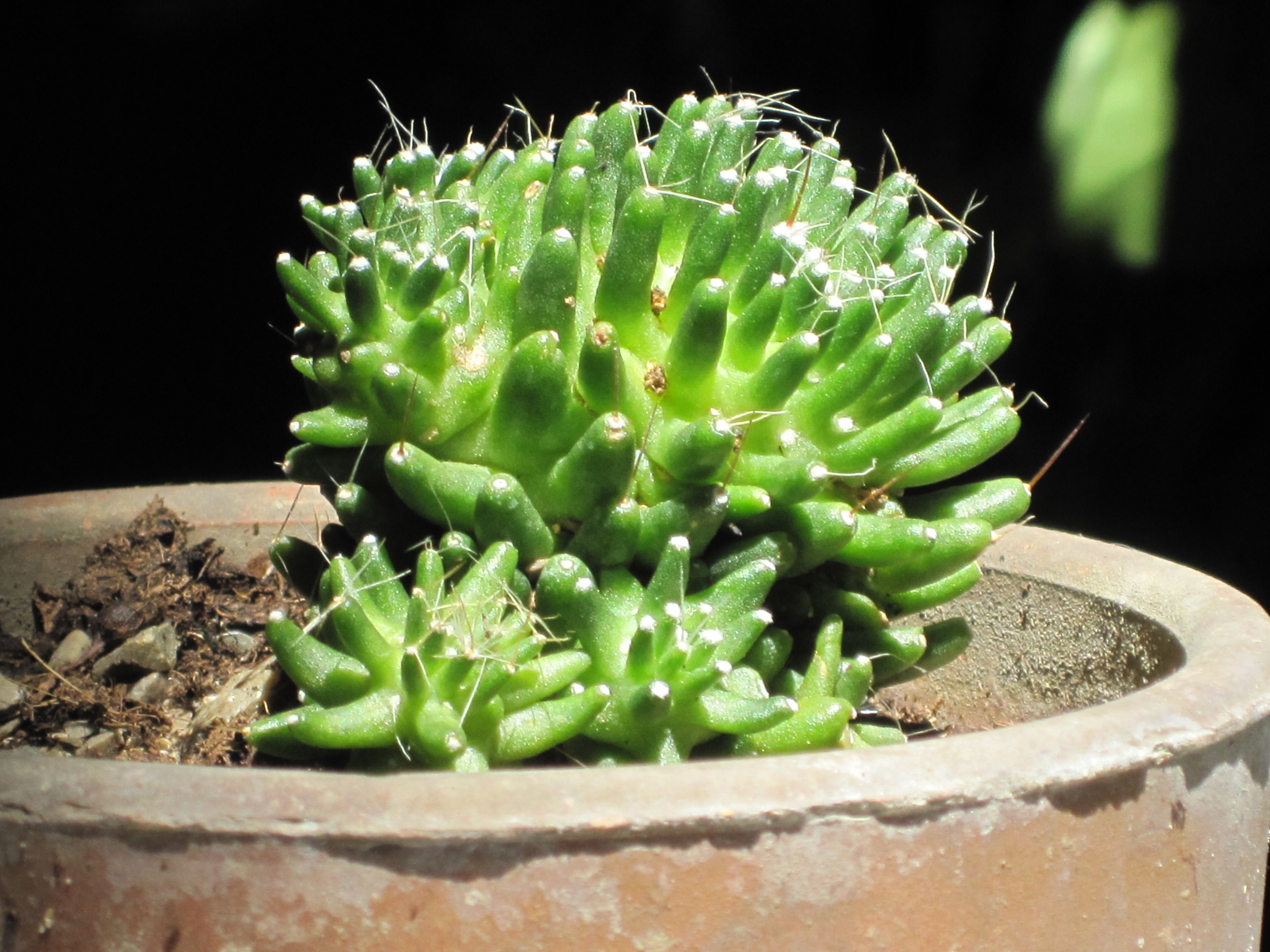

Conservation status
- Data Deficient (IUCN 3.1)

Scientific classification
- Kingdom: Plantae
- Clade: Embryophytes
- Clade: Tracheophytes
- Clade: Spermatophytes
- Clade: Angiosperms
- Clade: Eudicots
- Order: Caryophyllales
- Family: Cactaceae
- Subfamily: Cactoideae
- Genus: Mammillaria
- Species: M. painteri

Binomial name
- Mammillaria painteri Rose ex Quehl

= Mammillaria painteri =

Species of cactus

Mammillaria painteri is a species of plant in the family Cactaceae. It is endemic to Mexico. It is usually found near, but not limited to, San Juan del Rio, Guanajuato. It is commonly referred to as the biznaguita in Spanish. It is also known by many to be synonymous with Mammillaria crinita subspecies crinita. It was evaluated and added to the IUCN Redlist in 2002 as data deficient. The causes of this species' endangerment or threats to its well-being are not clear.

== Description ==
Mammillaria painteri is characterized by small, spherical mounds that sprout conical or cylindrical tubercles. The globose mounds, or stems, are dark green and can range from one to eight centimeters in height and diameter. In its monstrose form, Mammillaria painteri forma mostruosa, it can grow to be larger than that. The mounds may be clustered together or singular. It typically has white or pale light yellow flowers. Rarely, it will sometimes produce light pink or magenta flowers as well. The flowers are shallow and funnel-shaped.

This species is known to withstand temperatures down to at least -2 or -5 degrees Celsius if kept completely dry. It is not known to do well in direct, intense sunlight, mainly in summer months. It is also sensitive to red spider mite.
