= Anthurium sulcatum =

Conservation status
- Data Deficient (IUCN 3.1)

Scientific classification
- Kingdom: Plantae
- Clade: Tracheophytes
- Clade: Angiosperms
- Clade: Monocots
- Order: Alismatales
- Family: Araceae
- Genus: Anthurium
- Species: A. sulcatum

Binomial name
- Anthurium sulcatum Engl.

Species of flowering plant

Anthurium sulcatum is a species of plant in the family Araceae. It is endemic to Ecuador, and became known to the scientific community when Luis Sodiro collected a type in the Pichincha province in 1882. A collection of the species was housed in the Berlin herbarium, which was destroyed during the Second World War. Its natural habitat is subtropical or tropical moist lowland forests. It is threatened by habitat loss.
