= Astragalus coarctatus =

Conservation status
- Data Deficient (IUCN 3.1)

Scientific classification
- Kingdom: Plantae
- Clade: Tracheophytes
- Clade: Angiosperms
- Clade: Eudicots
- Clade: Rosids
- Order: Fabales
- Family: Fabaceae
- Subfamily: Faboideae
- Genus: Astragalus
- Species: A. coarctatus

Binomial name
- Astragalus coarctatus Trautv.

Synonyms
- Astracantha coarctata (Trautv.) Greuter

Species of legume

Astragalus coarctatus is a species of milkvetch that is endemic to northeastern Turkey, and is only known from its type specimen, collected in 1871 in Kars Province.
