= Allium vasilevskajae =

Conservation status
- Data Deficient (IUCN 3.1)

Scientific classification
- Kingdom: Plantae
- Clade: Tracheophytes
- Clade: Angiosperms
- Clade: Monocots
- Order: Asparagales
- Family: Amaryllidaceae
- Subfamily: Allioideae
- Genus: Allium
- Species: A. vasilevskajae

Binomial name
- Allium vasilevskajae Ogan.

Species of flowering plant

Allium vasilevskajae, or Vasilevskaya's onion, is a species of onion that is endemic to Syunik Province in Armenia. It was found in stony places and on screes in the upper montane zone, from elevations of 2,200–2,300 m. It is only known from two collections made half a century ago.
