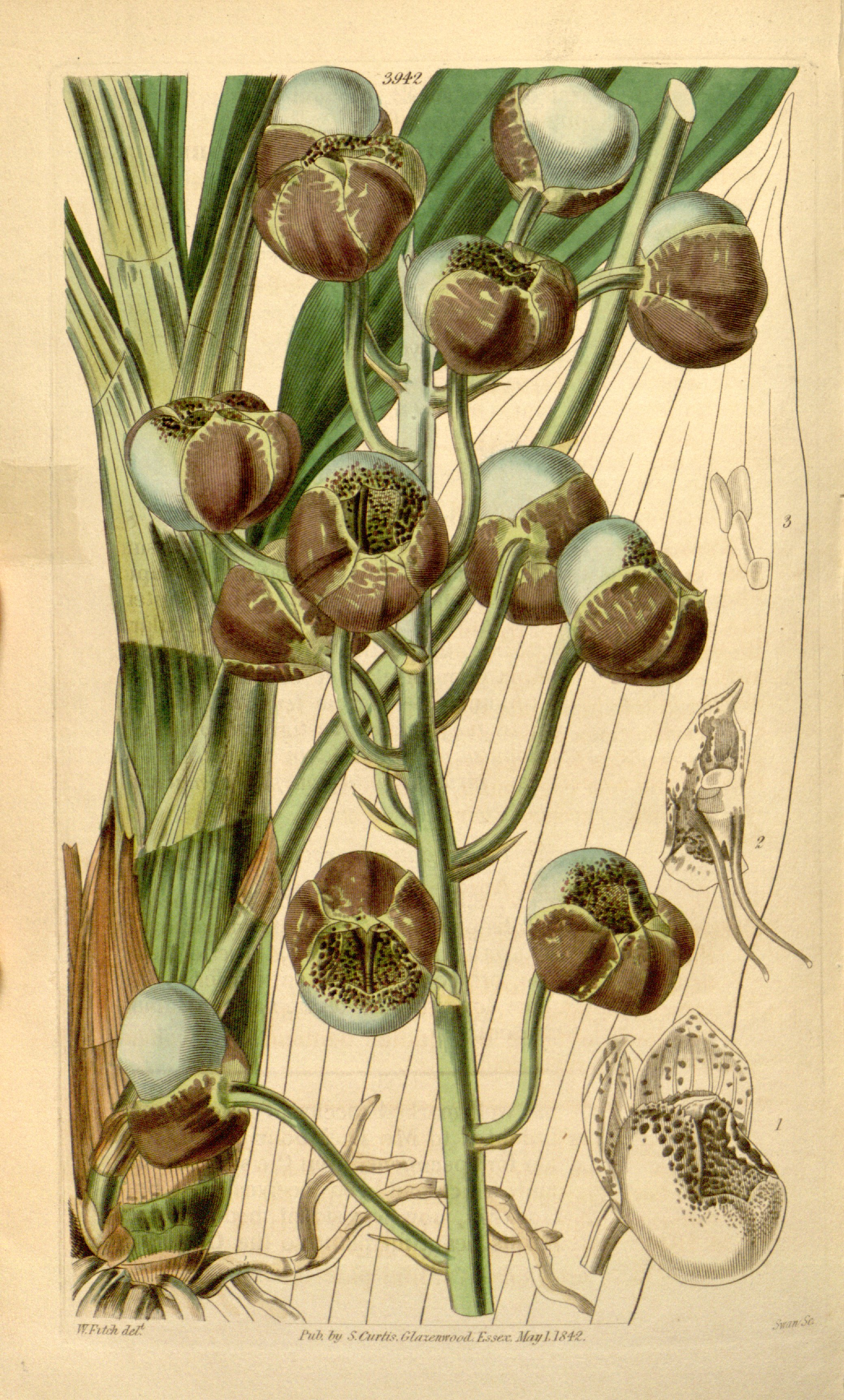

Scientific classification
- Kingdom: Plantae
- Clade: Tracheophytes
- Clade: Angiosperms
- Clade: Monocots
- Order: Asparagales
- Family: Orchidaceae
- Subfamily: Epidendroideae
- Genus: Catasetum
- Species: C. globiflorum

Binomial name
- Catasetum globiflorum Hook. (1842)

= Catasetum globiflorum =

Species of orchid

Catasetum globiflorum, the spheroid-flowered catasetum, is a species of orchid found in Brazil.
