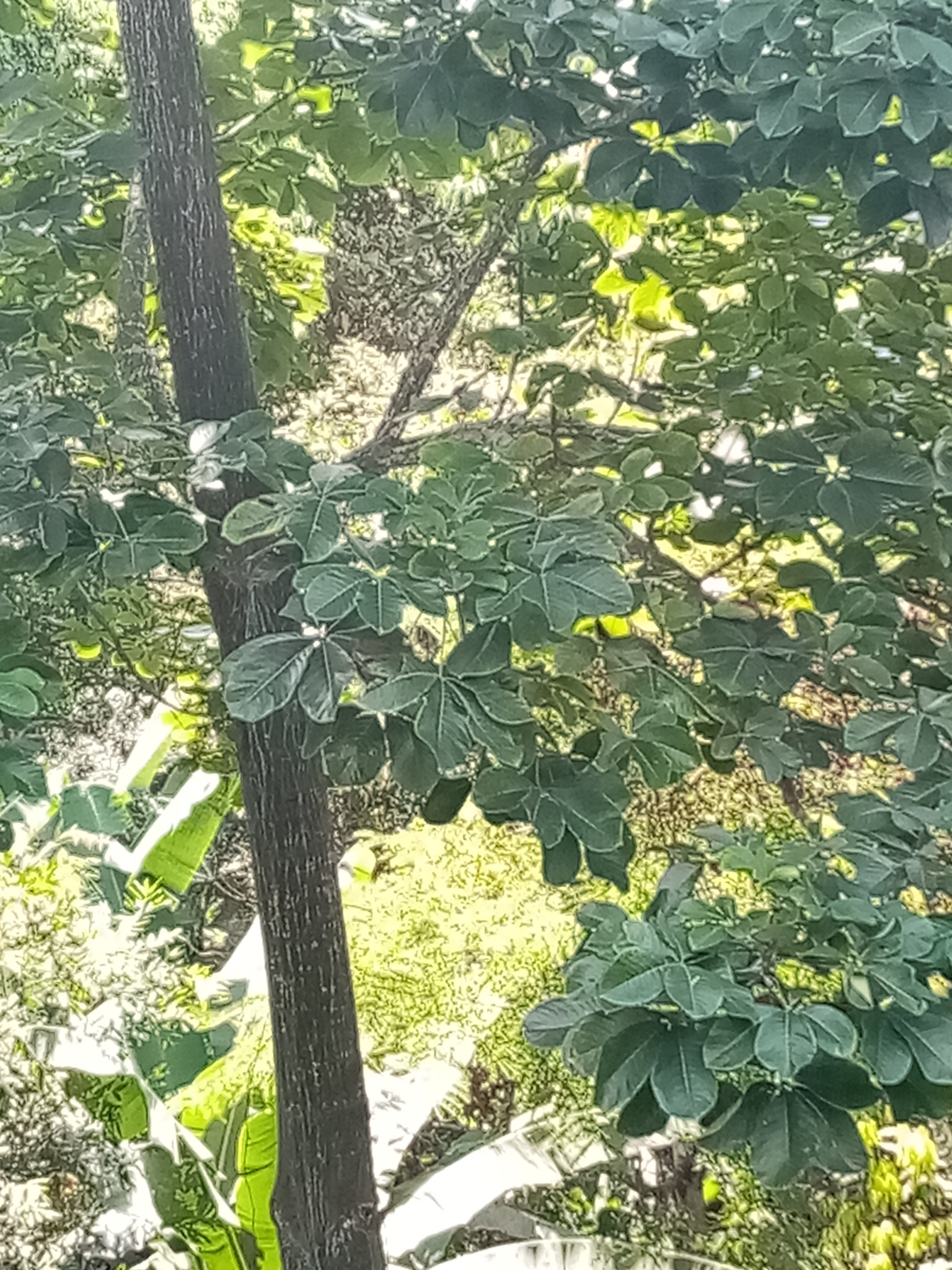

Conservation status
- Data Deficient (IUCN 3.1)

Scientific classification
- Kingdom: Plantae
- Clade: Tracheophytes
- Clade: Angiosperms
- Clade: Eudicots
- Clade: Rosids
- Order: Malvales
- Family: Malvaceae
- Genus: Pseudobombax
- Species: P. millei

Binomial name
- Pseudobombax millei (Standl.) A.Robyns

Synonyms
- Bombax millei Standl.; Pseudobombax guayasense A.Robyns

= Pseudobombax millei =

Species of flowering plant

Pseudobombax millei, the beldaco, is a species of flowering plant in the family Malvaceae. It is native to southwestern Colombia, Ecuador, and Peru. In Colombia it grows in the Pacific coastal lowlands of Nariño Department from sea level to 200 meters elevation. Its natural habitats are subtropical or tropical dry forests and subtropical or tropical moist lowland forests. It is threatened by habitat loss.

It is a dry-deciduous, tall tree with a spreading, open crown and long-stemmed, broadly oval, hand-shaped, deep green leaves that form a rosette at the branch ends. The upright, white flowers with 5 recurved petals and countless, highly protruding stamens appear at the end of the shoots, followed by cylindrical seed capsules. Flowers are creamy in color and smell pleasant.
