= Corryocactus pulquinensis =

Conservation status
- Endangered (IUCN 3.1)

Scientific classification
- Kingdom: Plantae
- Clade: Embryophytes
- Clade: Tracheophytes
- Clade: Spermatophytes
- Clade: Angiosperms
- Clade: Eudicots
- Order: Caryophyllales
- Family: Cactaceae
- Subfamily: Cactoideae
- Genus: Corryocactus
- Species: C. pulquinensis

Binomial name
- Corryocactus pulquinensis Cárdenas 1957

Species of cactus

Corryocactus pulquinensis is a species of Corryocactus found in Bolivia.

== Description ==
Corryocactus pulquinensis is a sparsely branched, shrubby cactus that grows prostrate or climbing. Its bright green stems can reach 3 to 4 meters in length and 3 to 4 centimeters in diameter. The stems feature 4 to 5 blunt, notched ribs bearing areoles. Each areole contains 3 to 7 needle-like or awl-shaped white spines with darker tips, measuring 0.5 to 2 centimeters long. These spines are slightly pressed against the stem and are not clearly distinguishable as central and radial, with three of them directed downwards. Funnel-shaped to bell-shaped flowers, ranging from golden yellow to orange, appear in clusters of 3 to 4 near the stem apex. These flowers are 7 to 7.5 centimeters long.

== Distribution ==
Native to eastern Bolivia, specifically the Santa Cruz department, Corryocactus pulquinensis primarily inhabits desert or dry scrub biomes at altitudes around 1500 meters.

== Taxonomy ==
The species was first described by Bolivian botanist Martín Cárdenas Hermosa in 1957 and named after the Bolivian town of Pulquina, its type locality.
