= Corryocactus ayopayanus =

Scientific classification
- Kingdom: Plantae
- Clade: Tracheophytes
- Clade: Angiosperms
- Clade: Eudicots
- Order: Caryophyllales
- Family: Cactaceae
- Subfamily: Cactoideae
- Genus: Corryocactus
- Species: C. ayopayanus

Binomial name
- Corryocactus ayopayanus Cárdenas, 1952

Species of cactus

Corryocactus ayopayanus is a species of Corryocactus found in Bolivia.

== Description ==
This species branches extensively from its base, forming cylindrical, dull green stems that reach heights of 1 to 1.5 meters and measure 3 to 3.5 cm in diameter. The stems feature 4 to 5 ribs, each up to 1 cm high, where the areoles are situated. These areoles bear 10 to 13 spines that radiate in all directions and cannot be differentiated into central and radial types. The spines vary in length, with some measuring up to 0.5 cm, others between 1.5 and 2 cm, and the longest reaching 3 to 5 cm. At the apex of the stems, funnel-shaped flowers appear, displaying salmon-pink to reddish hues. These flowers can be up to 6 cm long and up to 7 cm in diameter. The fruits are spherical, yellowish-green, spiny, and approximately 3 cm in diameter.

== Distribution ==
Corryocactus ayopayanus, a shrubby cactus species native to central Bolivia, specifically the province of Ayopaya, thrives in desert or dry scrub biomes at altitudes around 2700 meters.

== Taxonomy ==
Corryocactus ayopayanus was first described by Bolivian botanist Martín Cárdenas Hermosa and published in Revista de Agricultura (Cochabamba) 7: 21 in 1952. The specific epithet "ayopayanus" directly references the Ayopaya province, its native locality.
