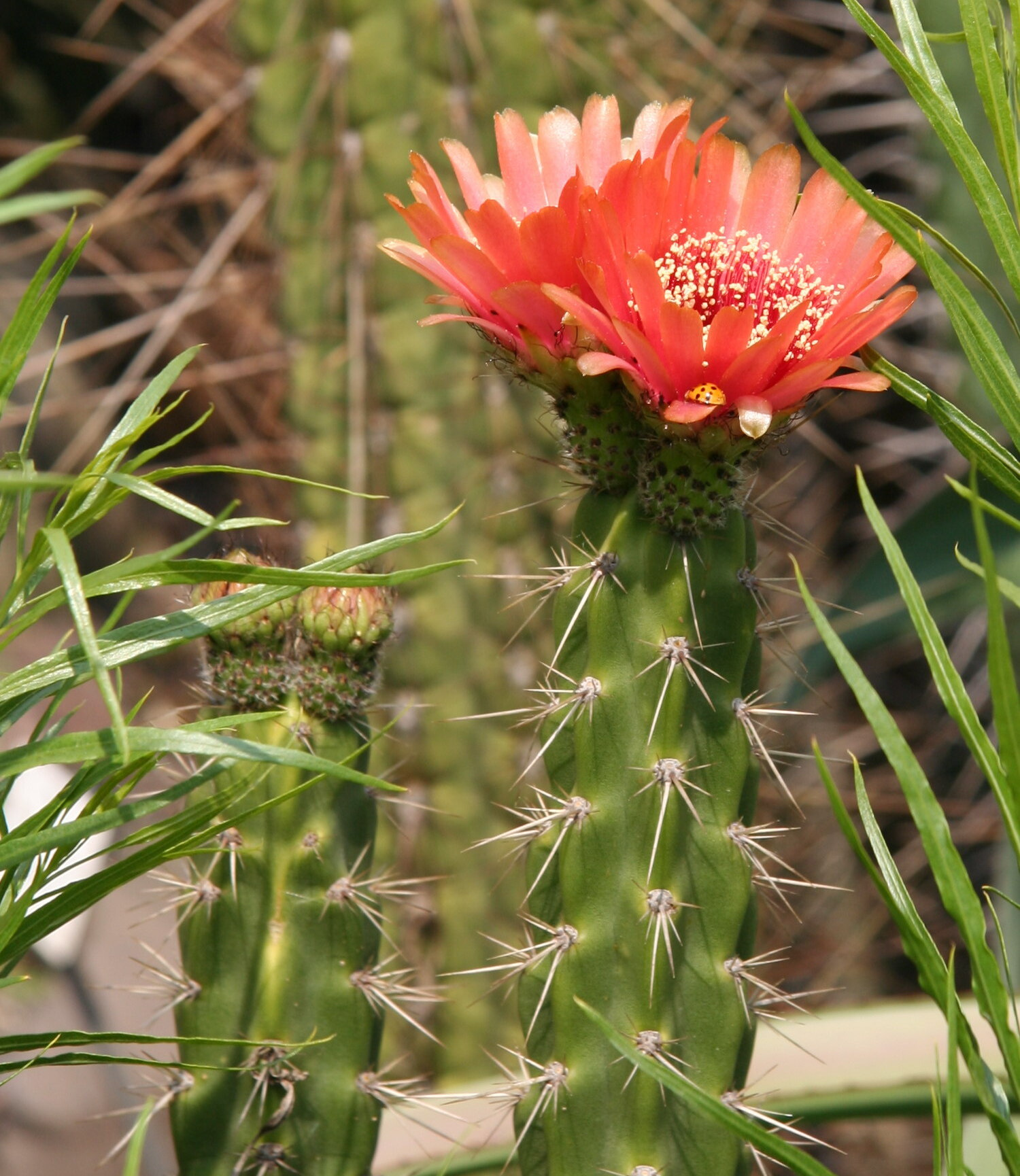

Conservation status
- Least Concern (IUCN 3.1)

Scientific classification
- Kingdom: Plantae
- Clade: Tracheophytes
- Clade: Angiosperms
- Clade: Eudicots
- Order: Caryophyllales
- Family: Cactaceae
- Subfamily: Cactoideae
- Genus: Corryocactus
- Species: C. melanotrichus

Binomial name
- Corryocactus melanotrichus (K.Schum.) Britton & Rose 1920

Synonyms
- Cereus melanotrichus K.Schum. 1895; Erdisia melanotricha (K.Schum.) Backeb. 1936; Corryocactus charazanensis Cárdenas 1957; Corryocactus melanotrichus var. caulescens Cárdenas 1952; Corryocactus otuyensis Cárdenas 1963; Corryocactus perezianus Cárdenas 1952

= Corryocactus melanotrichus =

Species of cactus

Corryocactus melanotrichus is a species of Corryocactus found in Bolivia.

== Description ==
This species is a highly branched shrubby cactus that can grow up to 4 meters tall with vertical stems that have a yellowish-green epidermis and measure up to 6 cm in diameter. The stems are characterized by 7 to 9 ribs bearing areoles. These areoles feature unequal, awl-shaped spines that are initially light yellow to brown, aging to gray. Spines range from 0.7 to 2 cm in length, with some occasionally reaching up to 3 cm. While central and radial spines are not distinct, the spines contribute to the cactus's appearance. Corryocactus melanotrichus produces slightly purple flowers that can be up to 5 cm long and 6 cm in diameter. Its fruits are spherical, soft, and spiny, reaching a diameter of up to 6 cm.

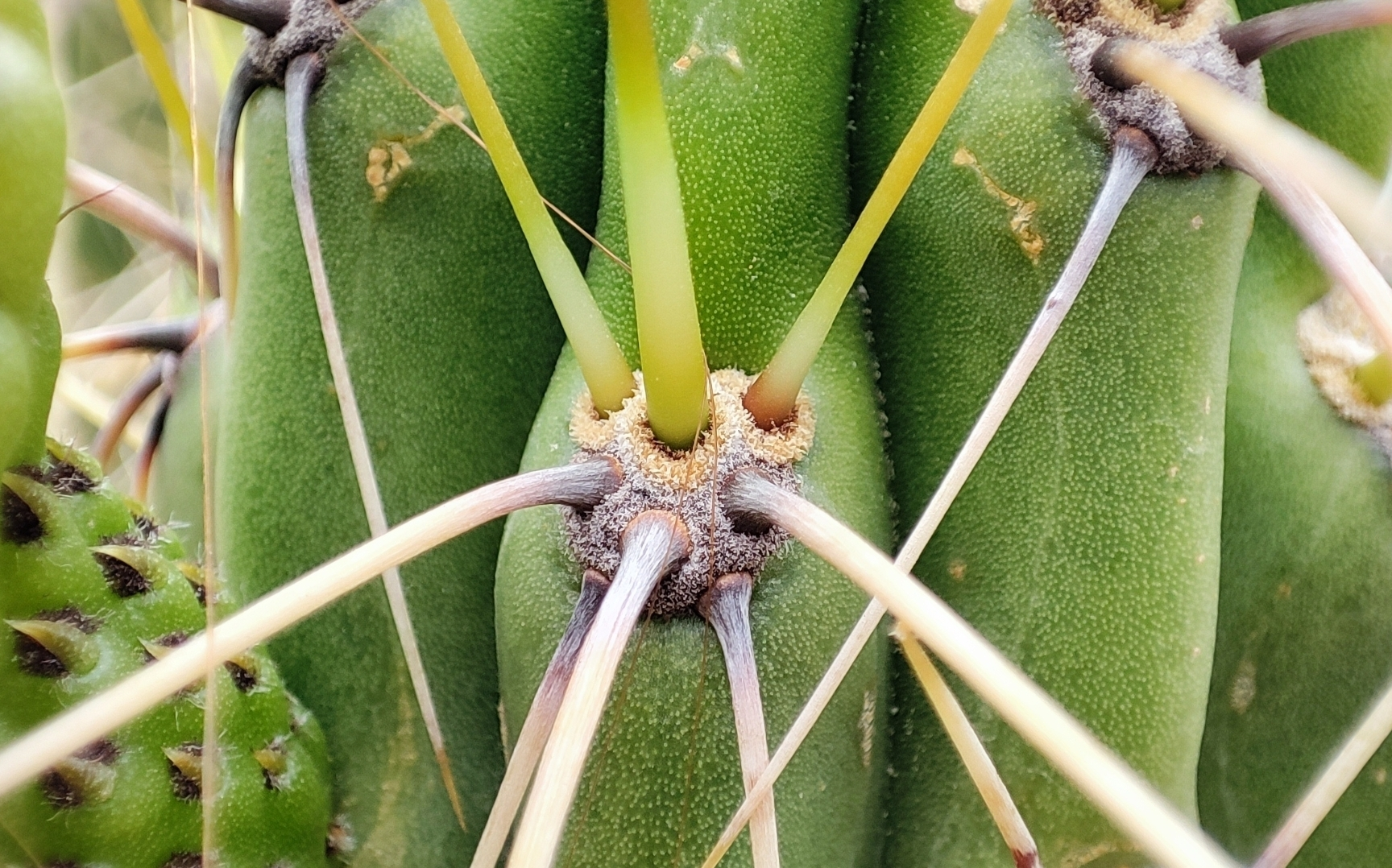
spines

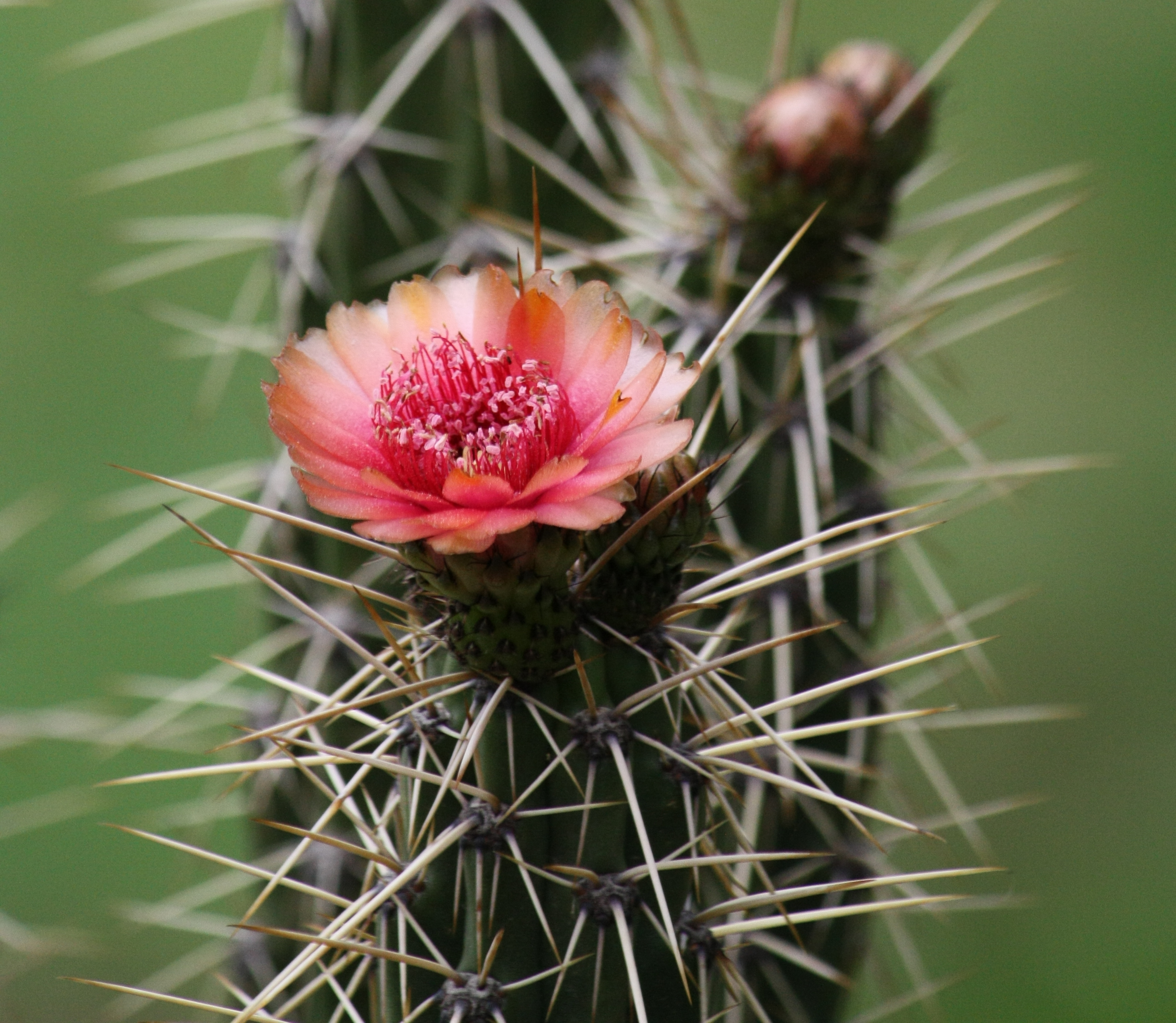
Flower

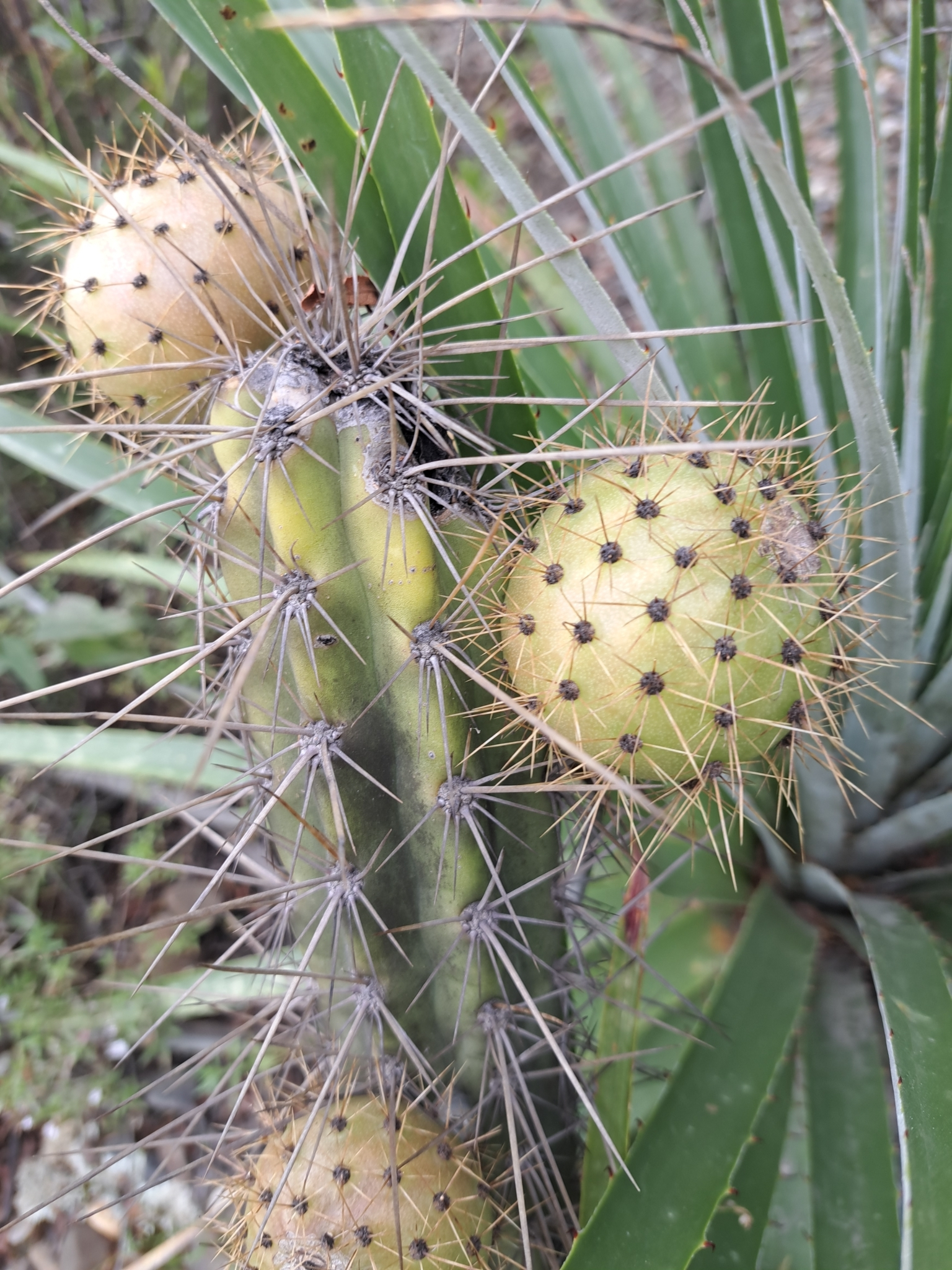
fruit

== Distribution ==
Corryocactus melanotrichus is native to Bolivia, found in the departments of La Paz, Chuquisaca, Cochabamba, Oruro, and Tarija. It thrives in desert or dry scrub biomes on slopes at elevations between 2100 and 3600 meters.

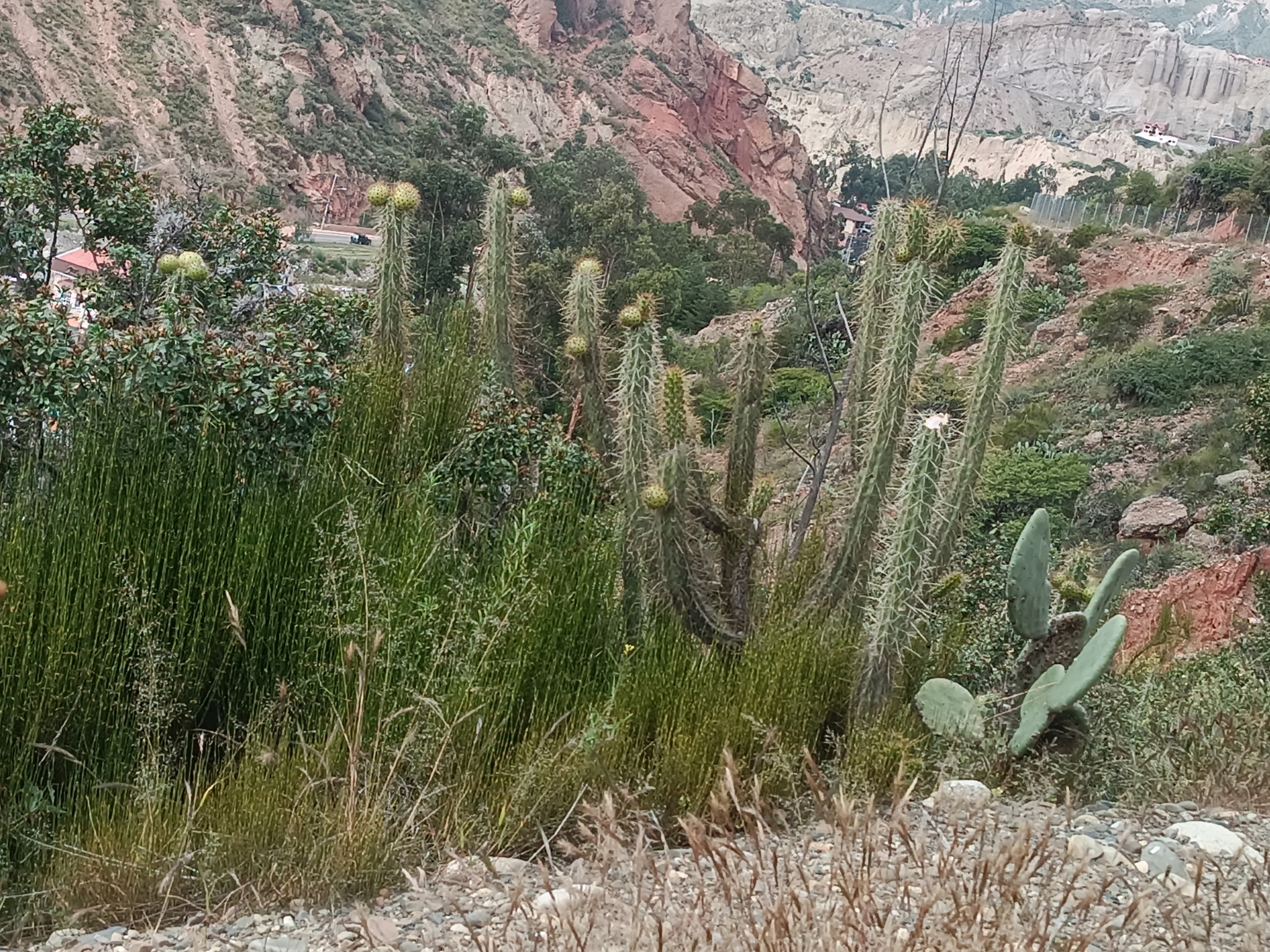
Habitat in La Paz, Bolivia

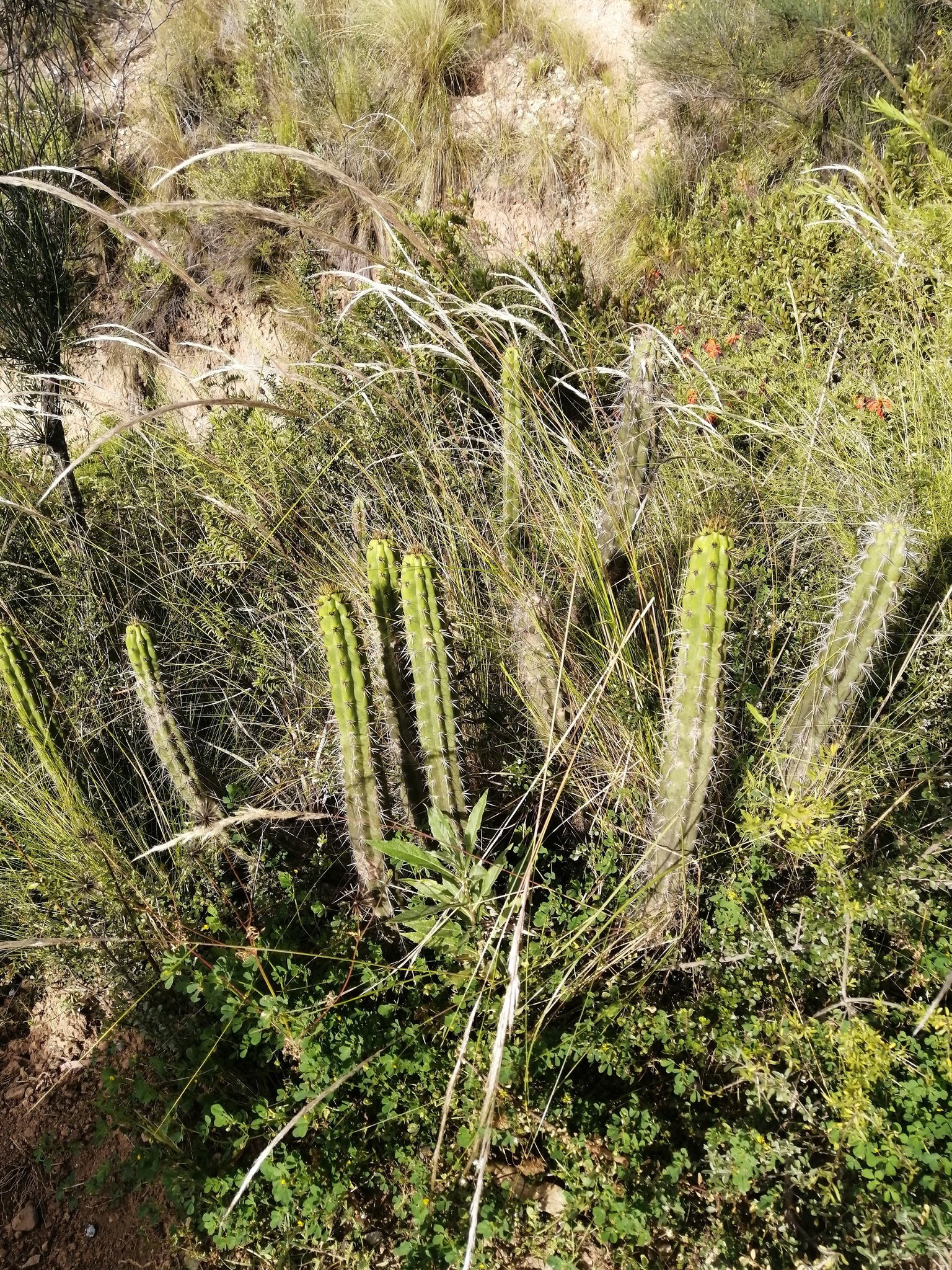
Habitat in La Paz, Bolivia

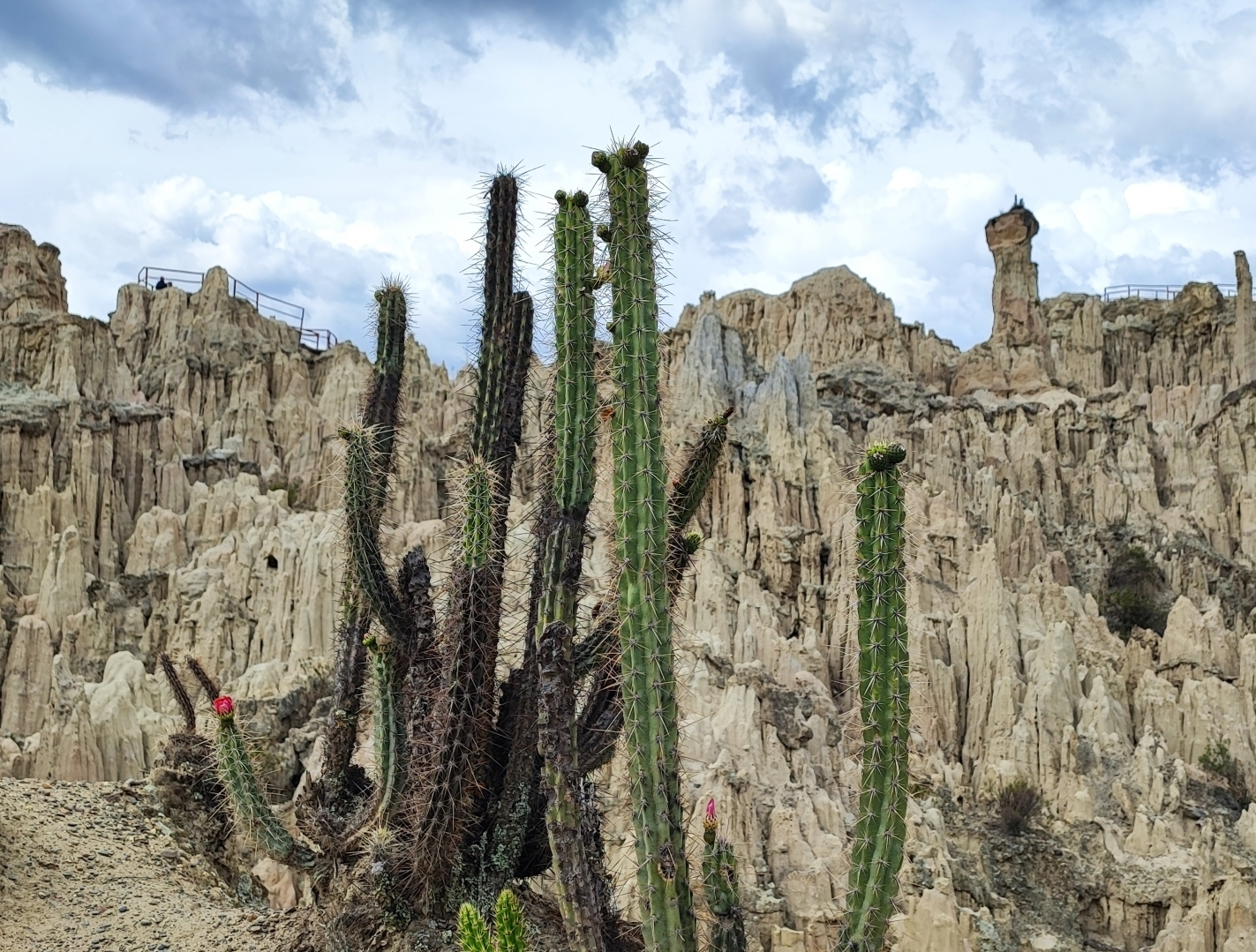
Habitat in La Paz, Bolivia

== Taxonomy ==
The species was first described as Cereus melanotrichus in 1895 by Karl Moritz Schumann. It was later transferred to the genus Corryocactus by Nathaniel Lord Britton and Joseph Nelson Rose in 1920. The specific epithet, melanotrichus, originates from the Greek words "melas" (black) and "thrix" (hair), referencing the black, felted areoles and black floral tube bristles.
