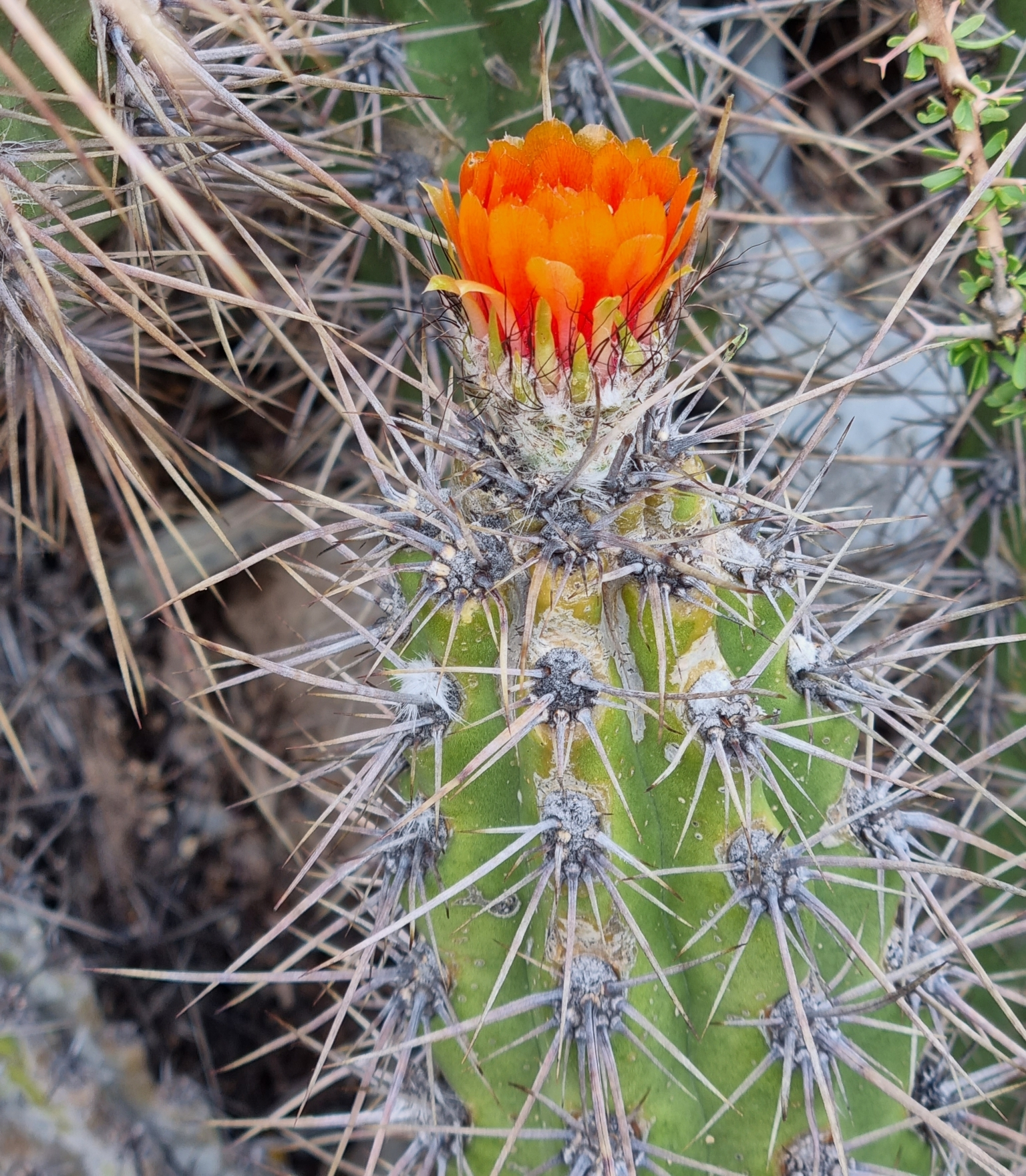

Conservation status
- Endangered (IUCN 3.1)

Scientific classification
- Kingdom: Plantae
- Clade: Tracheophytes
- Clade: Angiosperms
- Clade: Eudicots
- Order: Caryophyllales
- Family: Cactaceae
- Subfamily: Cactoideae
- Genus: Corryocactus
- Species: C. tarijensis

Binomial name
- Corryocactus tarijensis Cárdenas 1952

= Corryocactus tarijensis =

Species of cactus

Corryocactus tarijensis is a species of Corryocactus found in Bolivia.

== Description ==
This species exhibits rhizomatous roots and can grow either prostrate or erect. Its grayish-green stems reach 20 to 60 cm in length and up to 4.5 cm in diameter. The stems are marked by up to seven ribs, each 1.5 cm high. Grayish areoles on these ribs bear 13 gray spines, characterized by brown tips and a wider base. These spines, measuring 1 to 5 cm, are indistinguishable as central or radial. Corryocactus tarijensis produces orange-red flowers that are 3 to 4 cm long and up to 4 cm in diameter. The spherical fruits, up to 2 cm in diameter, are covered in dark brown spines and contain brown seeds.

== Distribution ==
Corryocactus tarijensis is a small, shrub-like cactus found in Bolivia, specifically in the Tarija department. It grows in desert or dry scrub biomes within inter-Andean valleys at altitudes of 2800 to 3200 meters.

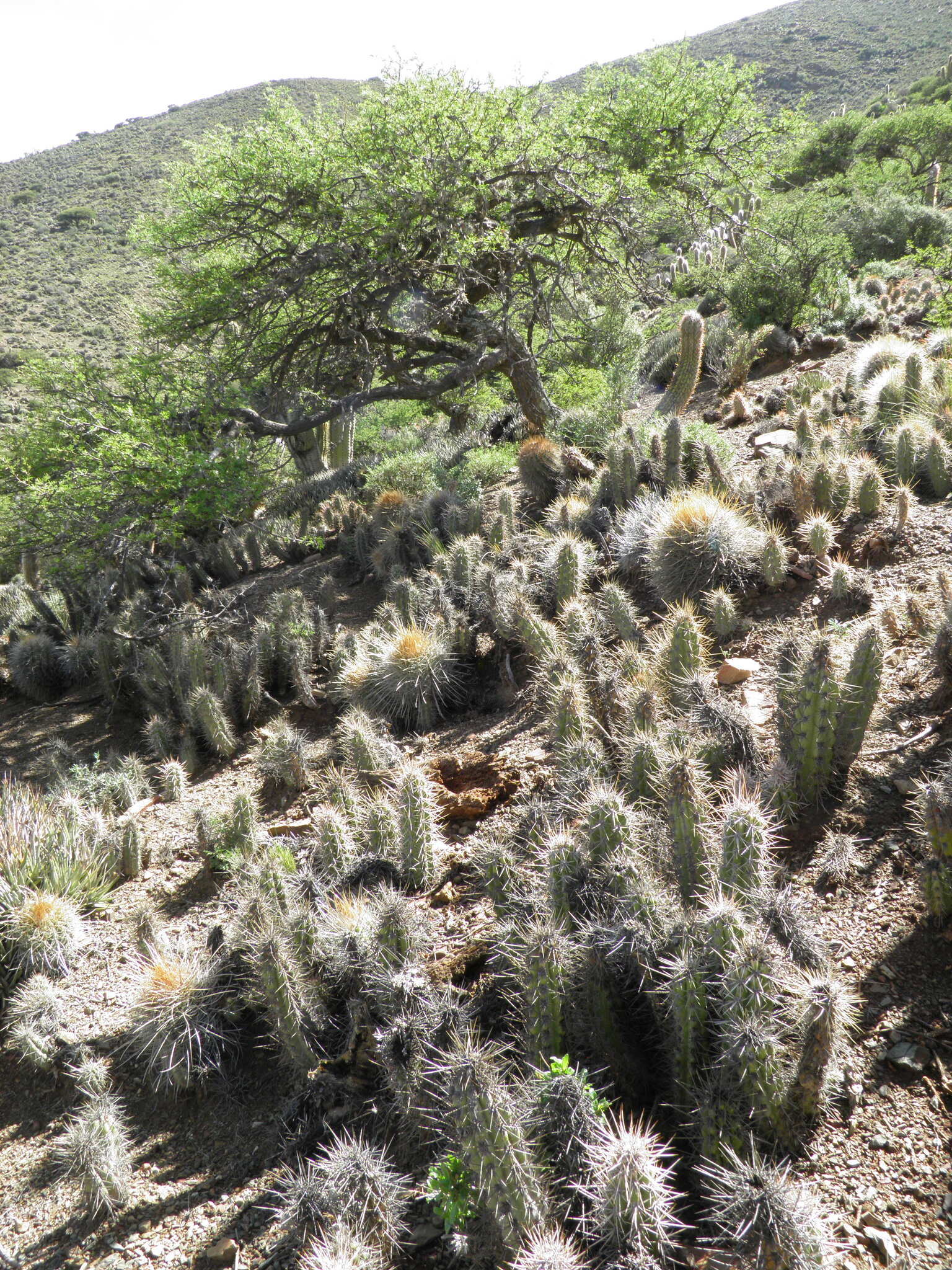
Habitat in Chayaza, Bolivia

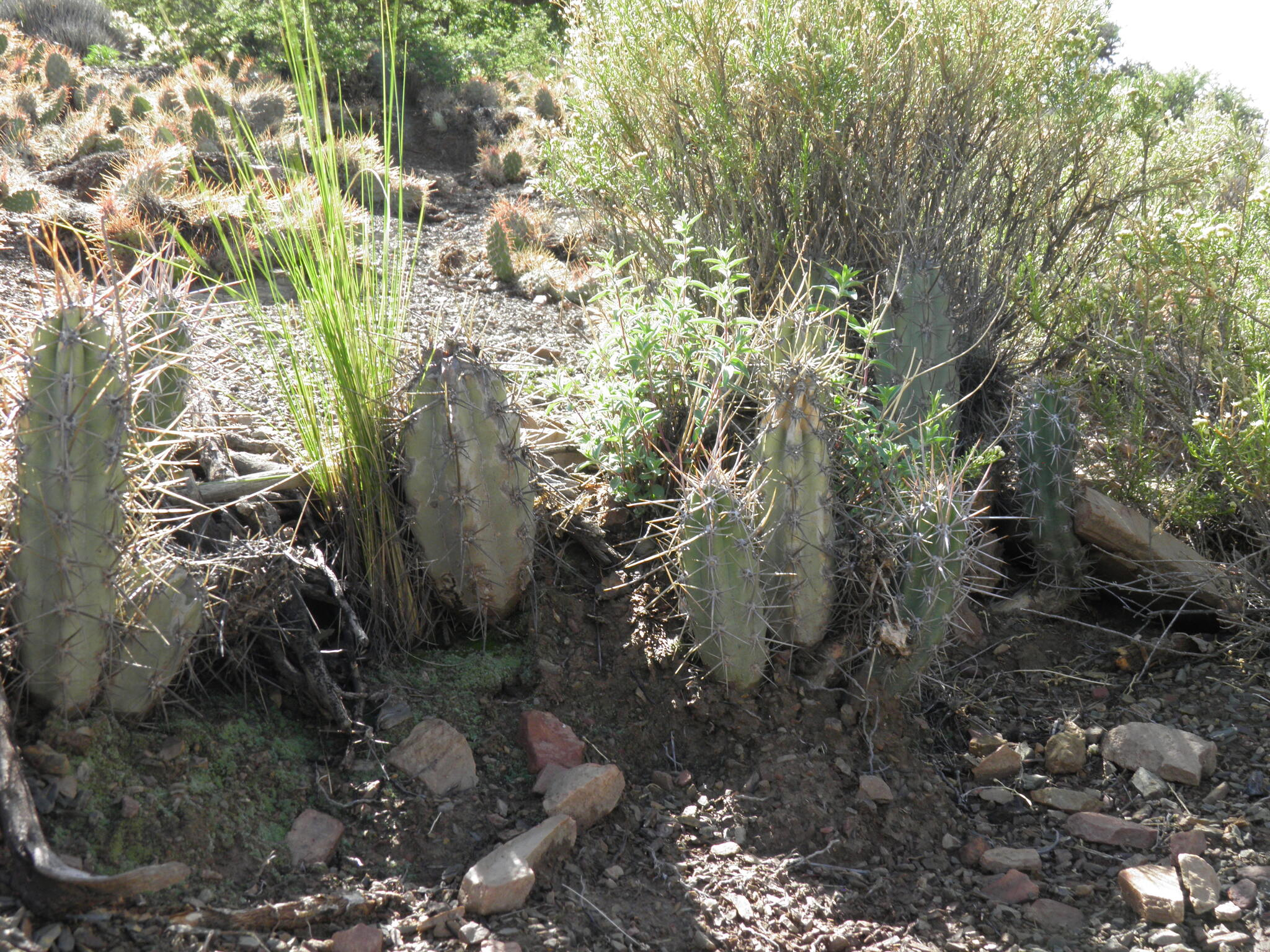
Plants growing in Chayaza, Bolivia

== Taxonomy ==
The species was described by Bolivian botanist Martín Cárdenas Hermosa and first published in the Revista de Agricultura (Cochabamba) 7: 23 in 1952. The specific epithet "tarijensis" refers to its native distribution in the department of Tarija.
