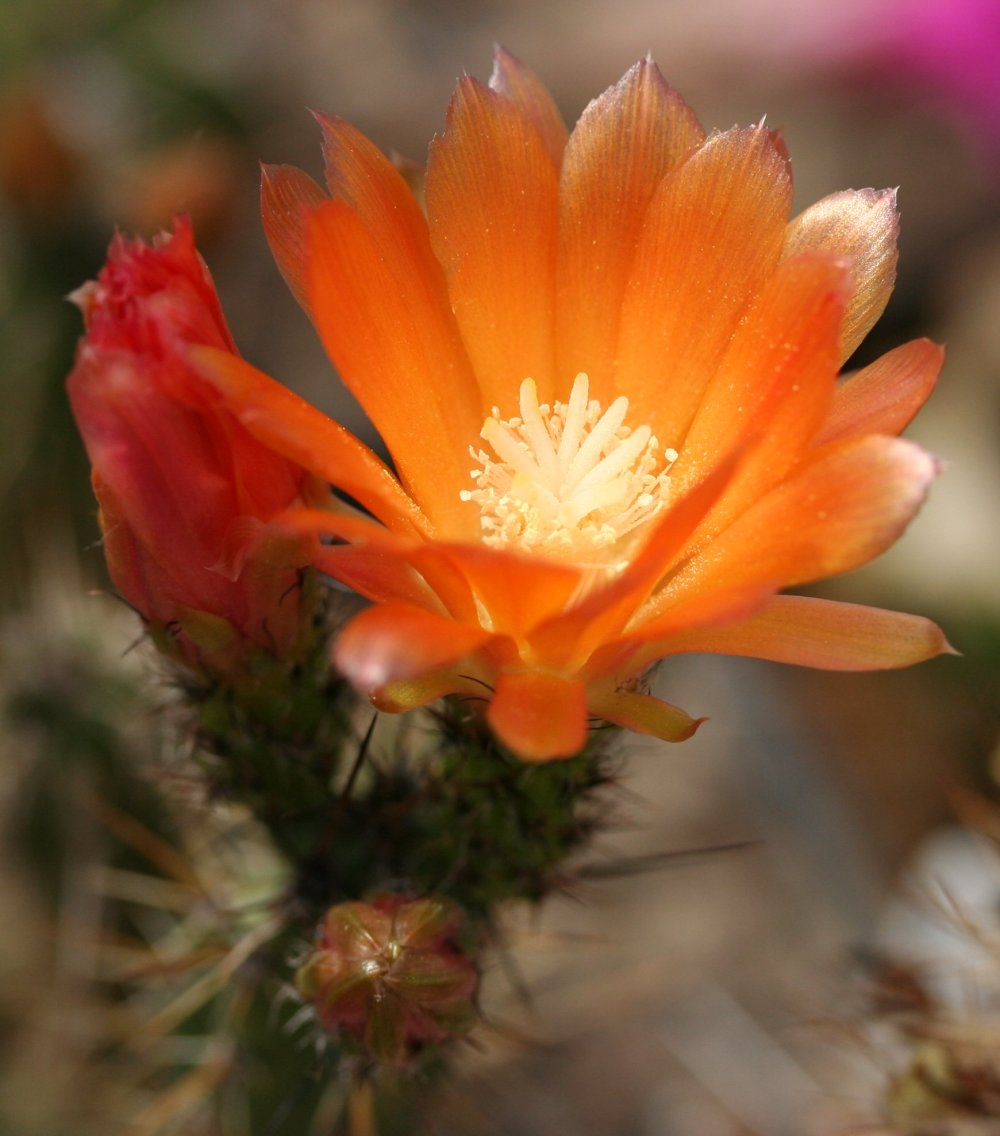

Scientific classification
- Kingdom: Plantae
- Clade: Tracheophytes
- Clade: Angiosperms
- Clade: Eudicots
- Order: Caryophyllales
- Family: Cactaceae
- Subfamily: Cactoideae
- Genus: Corryocactus
- Species: C. apiciflorus

Binomial name
- Corryocactus apiciflorus (Vaupel) Hutchison 1963

Synonyms
- Cereus apiciflorus Vaupel 1913; Erdisia apiciflora (Vaupel) Werderm. 1940; Corryocactus brachycladus F.Ritter 1981; Corryocactus erici-marae Cieza 2013 publ. 2012; Corryocactus huincoensis F.Ritter 1981; Corryocactus matucanensis F.Ritter 1981; Corryocactus maximus (Backeb.) Hutchison 1963; Corryocactus megarhizus F.Ritter 1981; Corryocactus melaleucus F.Ritter 1981; Corryocactus pilispinus F.Ritter 1981; Corryocactus solitarius F.Ritter 1981; Corryocactus tenuiculus (Backeb.) Hutchison 1963; Erdisia fortalezensis F.Ritter 1964; Erdisia maxima Backeb. 1942; Erdisia tenuicula Backeb. 1956 publ. 1957

= Corryocactus apiciflorus =

Species of cactus

Corryocactus apiciflorus is a species of columnar cactus found in the country of Peru.

== Description ==
Corryocactus apiciflorus grows as a shrub with spreading or ascending, densely thorny shoots up to 50 centimeters long and 2.5 centimeters in diameter. There are eight low ribs. The individual central spine is up to 1 centimeter long. The approximately 10 spread out radial spines are also up to 1 centimeter long.

The red flowers are up to 4 centimeters long. They appear in groups near the tips of the shoots or sometimes on the sides of the shoots.

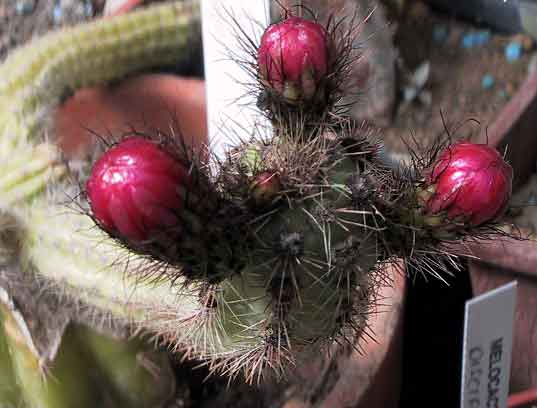
Fruits

== Distribution ==
Corryocactus apiciflorus is distributed in the Peruvian regions of La Libertad, Ancash and Ayacucho.

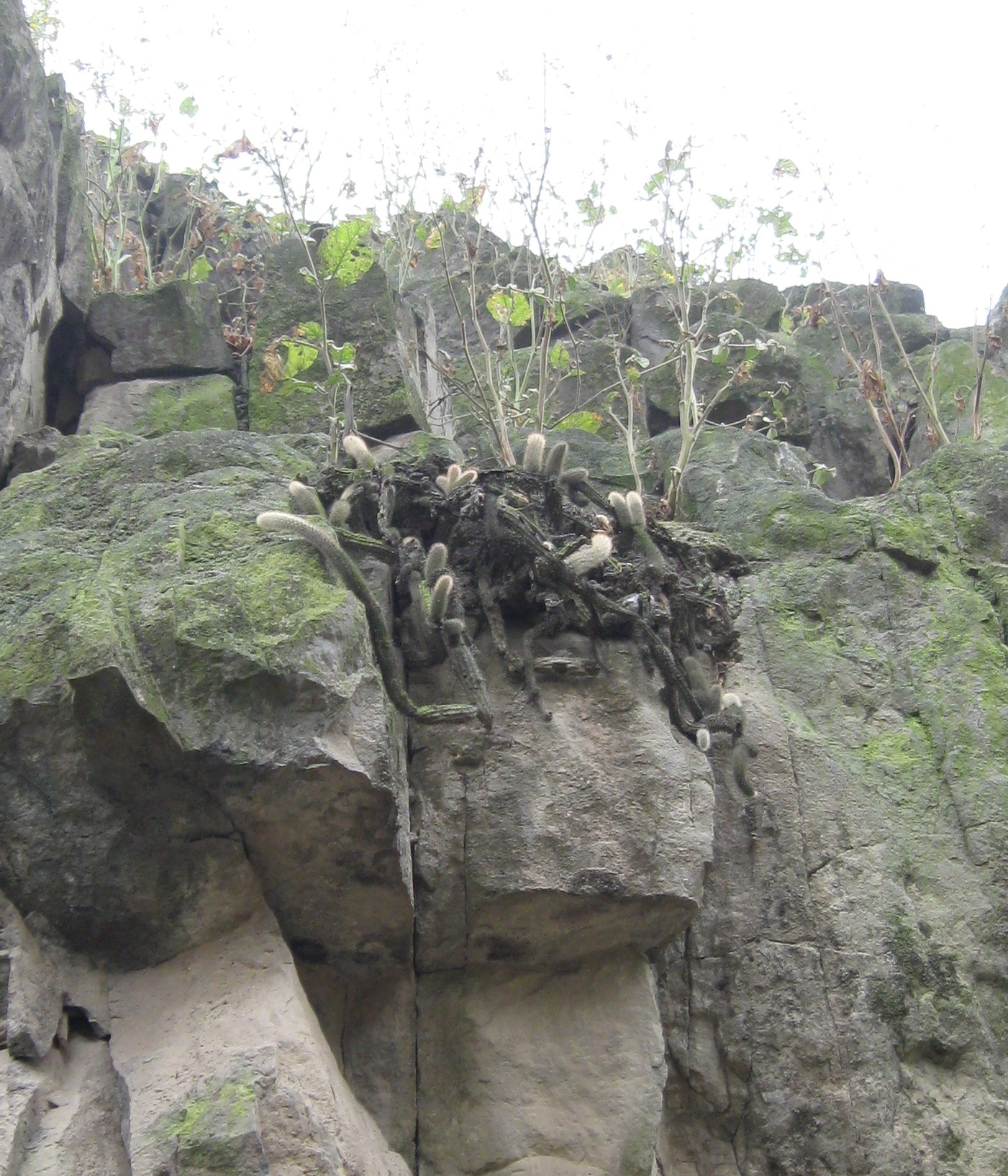
Habitat in Carabayllo, Peru

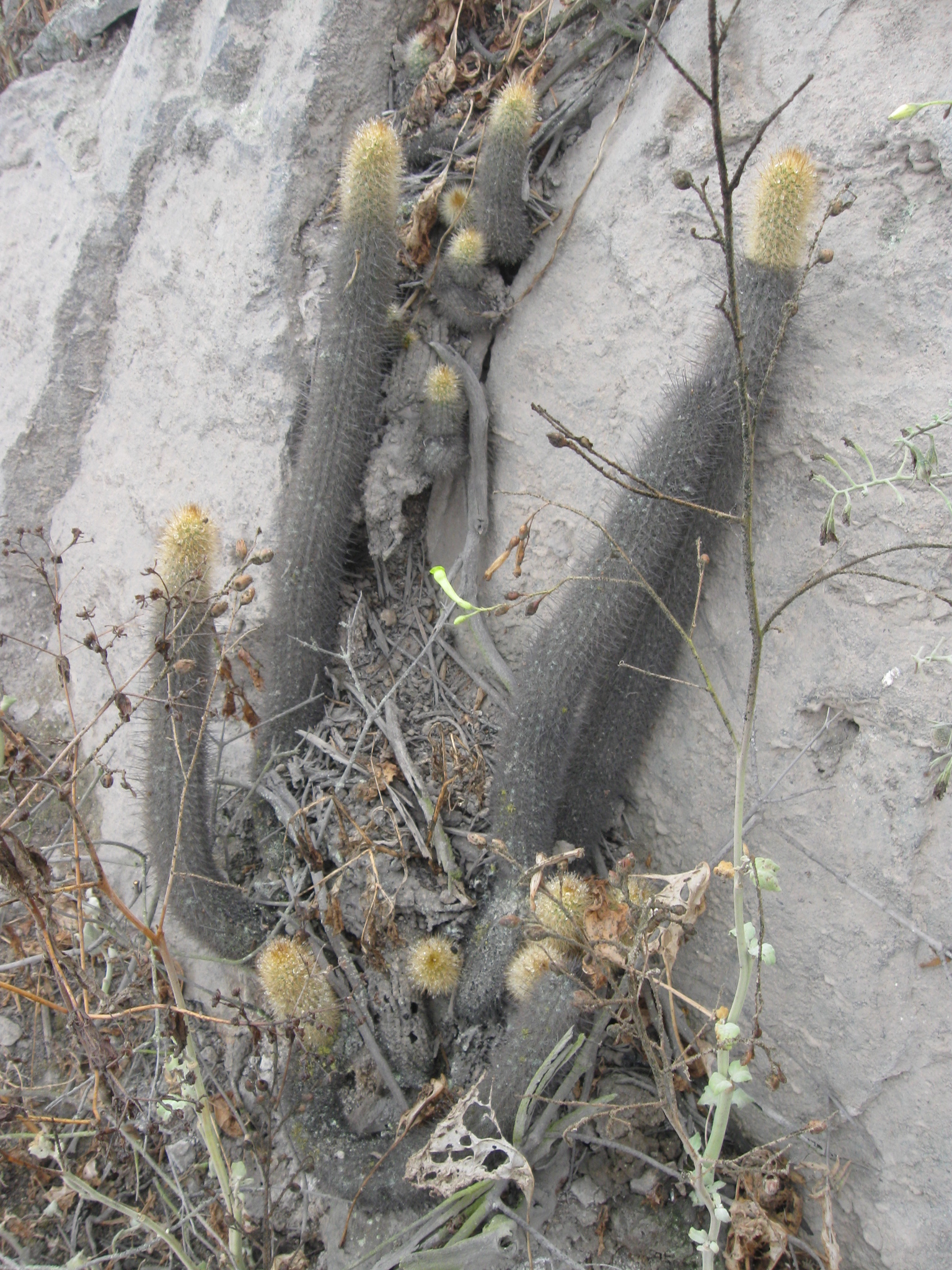

== Taxonomy ==
The first description as Cereus apiciflorus was made in 1913 by Friedrich Karl Johann Vaupel. The specific epithet apiciflorus is derived from the Latin words apex for 'tip' and -florus for '-flowered' and refers to the flowers that mainly appear at the tips of the shoots. Paul Clifford Hutchison placed the species in the genus Corryocactus in 1963. A nomenclature synonym is Erdisia apiciflora (Vaupel) Werderm. (1940).
