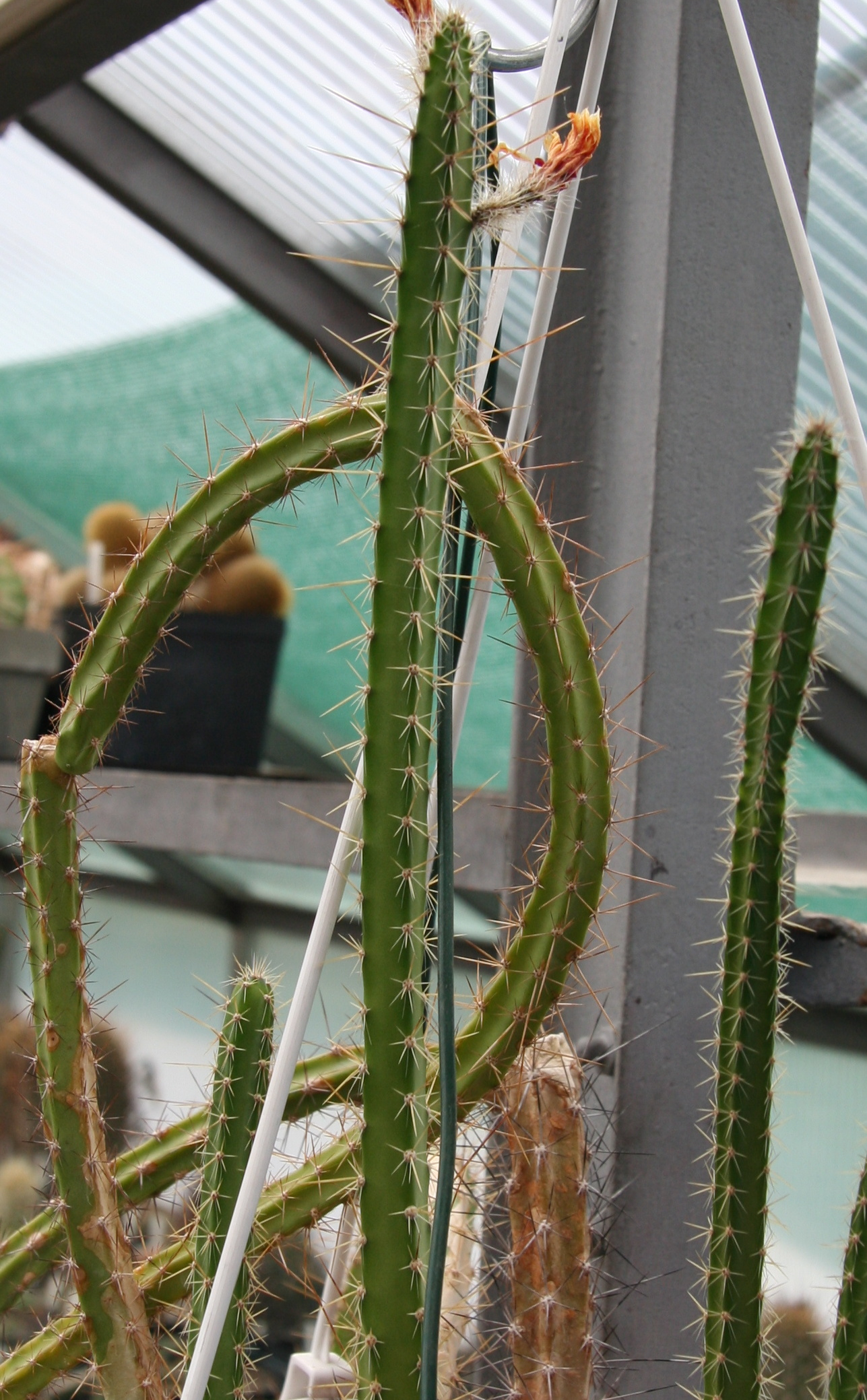

Scientific classification
- Kingdom: Plantae
- Clade: Tracheophytes
- Clade: Angiosperms
- Clade: Eudicots
- Order: Caryophyllales
- Family: Cactaceae
- Subfamily: Cactoideae
- Genus: Corryocactus
- Species: C. serpens

Binomial name
- Corryocactus serpens F.Ritter 1981

= Corryocactus serpens =

Species of cactus

Corryocactus serpens is a species of Corryocactus found in Peru.

== Description ==
Corryocactus serpens is a sparsely branched, shrubby cactus with stems, which are initially upright, become creeping and trailing, reaching lengths of 2 to 3 meters and a diameter of 1 to 2.5 cm (0.39 to 0.98 in). These stems have a green epidermis. Ribs on the stems number 4 to 6 and are obtuse. Areoles on these ribs bear 6 to 12 needle-like, straight, brown spines, each measuring 1 to 4 cm (0.39 to 1.57 in) long. The carmine red flowers are up to 2.1 cm (0.83 in) long and 1.8 cm (0.71 in) wide. The olive green fruits are approximately 2 cm (0.79 in) long and up to 1.6 cm (0.63 in) in diameter.

== Distribution ==
This species is native to the Huancavelica department of Peru. It thrives in desert or dry scrub biomes at altitudes of 2200 to 2600 meters.

== Taxonomy ==
The species was first described as Copiapoa serpens by Friedrich Ritter in 1981. The specific epithet "serpens" (Latin for "snake" or "creeping") refers to the plant's creeping growth habit.
