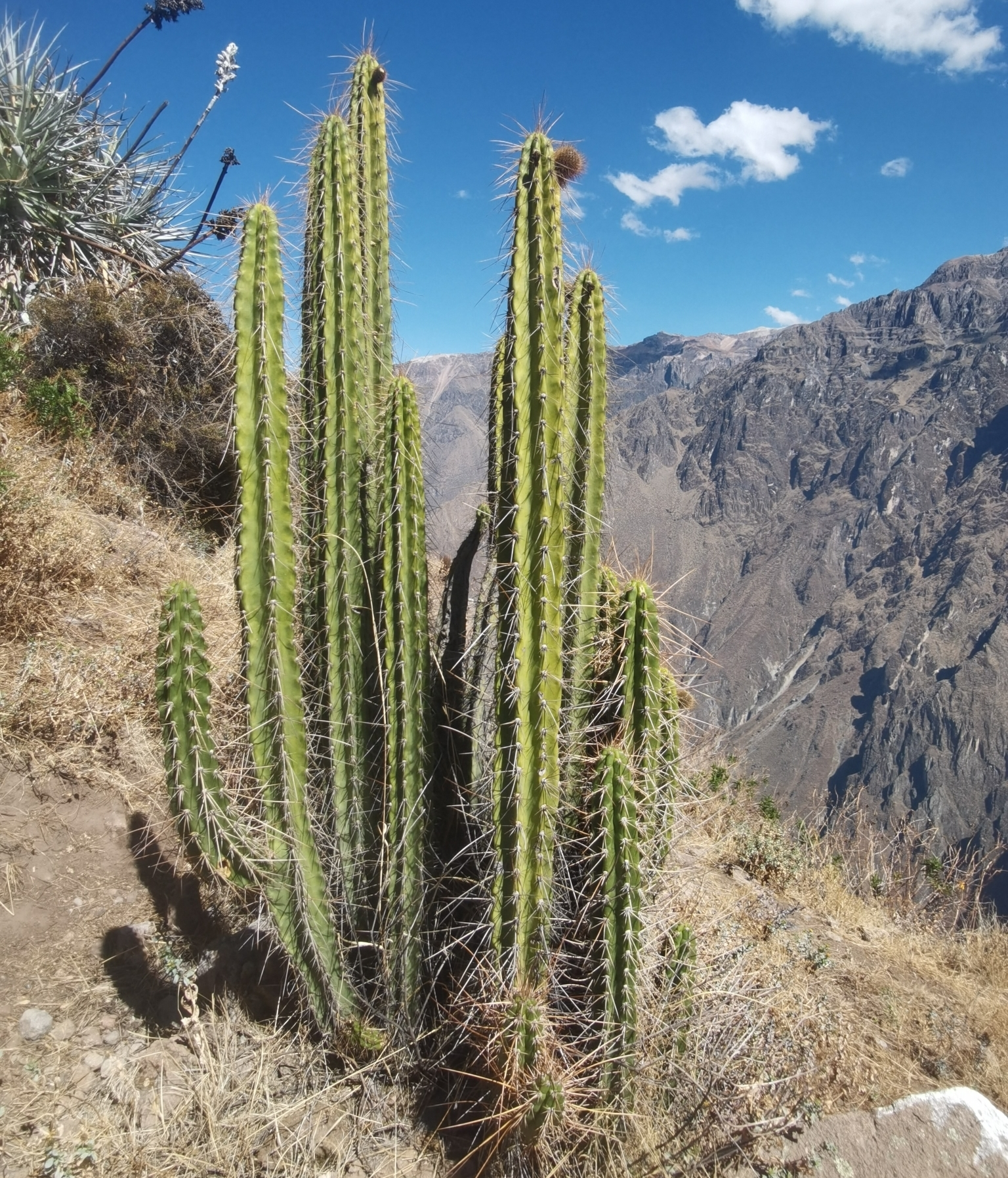
- Corryocactus brevistylus

Scientific classification
- Kingdom: Plantae
- Clade: Tracheophytes
- Clade: Angiosperms
- Clade: Eudicots
- Order: Caryophyllales
- Family: Cactaceae
- Subfamily: Cactoideae
- Tribe: Echinocereeae
- Genus: Corryocactus; Britton & Rose

Type species
- Corryocactus brevistylus

Species
- See text.

Synonyms
- Corryocereus Fric & Kreuz. (orth. var.); Erdisia Britton & Rose; Eulychnocactus Backeb. (nom. inval.)

= Corryocactus =

Genus of cacti

Corryocactus is a genus of cacti found in Bolivia, Peru and northern Chile.

== Description ==
These plants are characterized by profuse branching from their bases, with fibrous or sometimes tuberous root systems. Their stems, typically 2 to 5 cm thick, exhibit varied growth habits: smaller species are erect, while larger ones are prostrate with upright tips, climbing over vegetation, or initially erect before drooping. One notable species can form columns up to 5 meters tall with stems measuring 10 to 15 cm in diameter. The stems feature typically four to ten ribs that are swollen at the areoles, which are themselves tuberculate and heavily spined. Central spines can be quite long, usually 3 to 5 cm, but occasionally reaching up to 15 cm or even 25 cm. Corryocactus flowers emerge singly from the areoles and open during the day. These flowers have short tubes and bloom widely, ranging from 2 to 10 cm in diameter. The perianth segments display a color spectrum from yellow to orange to red, with variation possible within a single species. Following fertilization, spiny, spherical fruits develop, measuring 3 to 10 cm in diameter. These fruits contain dark brown to black seeds suspended in a juicy pulp.

== Distribution ==
Most Corryocactus species grow at altitudes between 2000 and 3000 meters, though some can be found in lowlands or ascend to elevations of up to 4000 meters.

== Taxonomy ==
The genus was described in 1920 by American botanists Nathaniel Lord Britton and Joseph Nelson Rose in their publication The Cactaceae. The name Corryocactus honors Thomas Avery Corry (1862–1942), an engineer for the Peruvian railway company Ferrocarril del Sur, whose work on the newly laid railway line led to the discovery of the first three known species. The genus was formerly placed in the tribe Notocacteae. It has also been placed in the tribe Echinocereeae. A 2011 molecular phylogenetic study excluded the genus from the "core" Echinocereeae, commenting that it lay "outside of a well-supported larger clade in our analysis".

== Species ==
As of September 2026, Plants of the World Online accepts the following species:

Image	Scientific name	Distribution
	Corryocactus apiciflorus (Vaupel) Hutchison	Peru
	Corryocactus aureus (Meyen) Hutchison	Peru
	Corryocactus ayacuchoensis Rauh & Backeb.	Peru
	Corryocactus ayopayanus Cárdenas	Bolivia
	Corryocactus brachypetalus (Vaupel) Britton & Rose	Bolivia
	Corryocactus brevistylus (K.Schum. ex Vaupel) Britton & Rose	Chile, Peru
	Corryocactus chachapoyensis (Ochoa & Backeb.) Ochoa & Backeb. ex D.R.Hunt	Peru
	Corryocactus dillonii A.Pauca & Quip.	Peru
	Corryocactus erectus (Backeb.) F.Ritter	Peru
	Corryocactus melanotrichus (K.Schum.) Britton & Rose	Bolivia
	Corryocactus pulquinensis Cárdenas	Peru
	Corryocactus quadrangularis (Rauh & Backeb.) F.Ritter ex D.R.Hunt, N.P.Taylor & G.J.Charles	Peru
	Corryocactus serpens F.Ritter	Peru
	Corryocactus squarrosus (Vaupel) Hutchison	Peru
	Corryocactus tarijensis Cárdenas	Bolivia
	Corryocactus volcanicus A.Pauca & Hoxey	Peru

== Synonymy ==
The following genera have been brought into synonymy with this genus:

- Corryocereus Fric & Kreuz. (orth. var.)
- Erdisia Britton & Rose
- Eulychnocactus Backeb. (nom. inval.)
