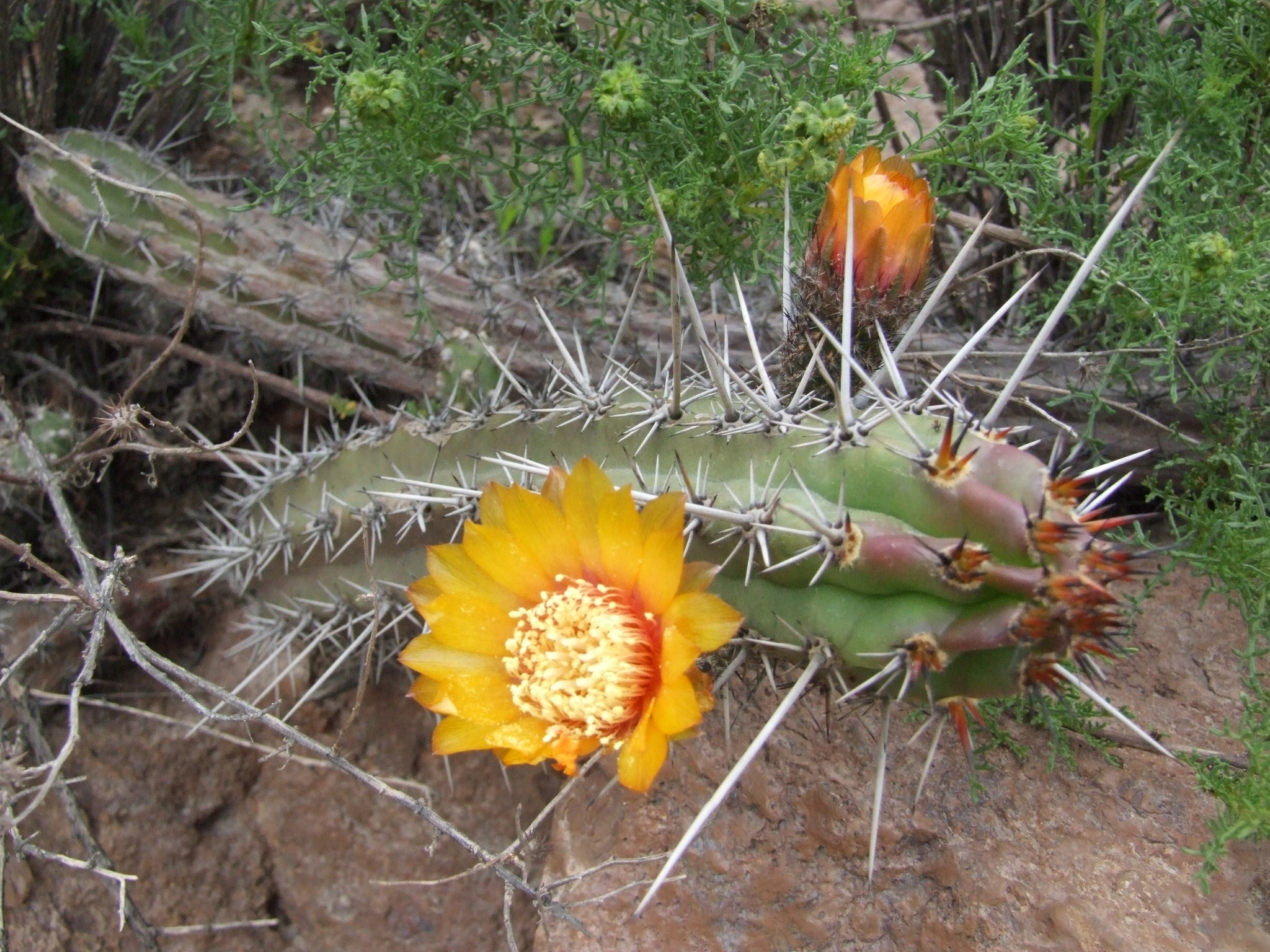

Scientific classification
- Kingdom: Plantae
- Clade: Tracheophytes
- Clade: Angiosperms
- Clade: Eudicots
- Order: Caryophyllales
- Family: Cactaceae
- Subfamily: Cactoideae
- Genus: Corryocactus
- Species: C. aureus

Binomial name
- Corryocactus aureus (Meyen) Hutchison 1963

Synonyms
- Cactus aureus Meyen 1834; Cereus aureus (Meyen) Meyen 1833; Cereus meyenii Werderm. 1931; Cleistocactus aureus (Meyen) F.A.C.Weber 1904; Echinocactus aureus (Meyen) Pfeiff. 1837; Erdisia meyenii Britton & Rose 1920; Corryocactus acervatus F.Ritter 1981; Corryocactus cuajonesensis F.Ritter 1981

= Corryocactus aureus =

Species of cactus

Corryocactus aureus is a species of Corryocactus found in and native to Peru.

== Description ==
Corryocactus aureus is a cactus species that forms large colonies through underground shoots. Its stems are erect, unsegmented, and range in shape from cylindrical to club-shaped, reaching up to 30 centimeters in length and 3 to 5 centimeters in diameter. The stems have 5 to 8 ribs, up to 1 centimeter high, which are slightly notched on their backs. The epidermis is typically green, though it can sometimes appear purple or brown. The areoles on the ribs bear awl-shaped spines that are brown to blackish. These include one or two central spines, which can grow up to 6 centimeters long, and nine to eleven radial spines of unequal length. The flowers are orange-yellow to orange-red and measure up to 4 centimeters long. The fruits are greenish to reddish and reach a diameter of up to 2 centimeters.

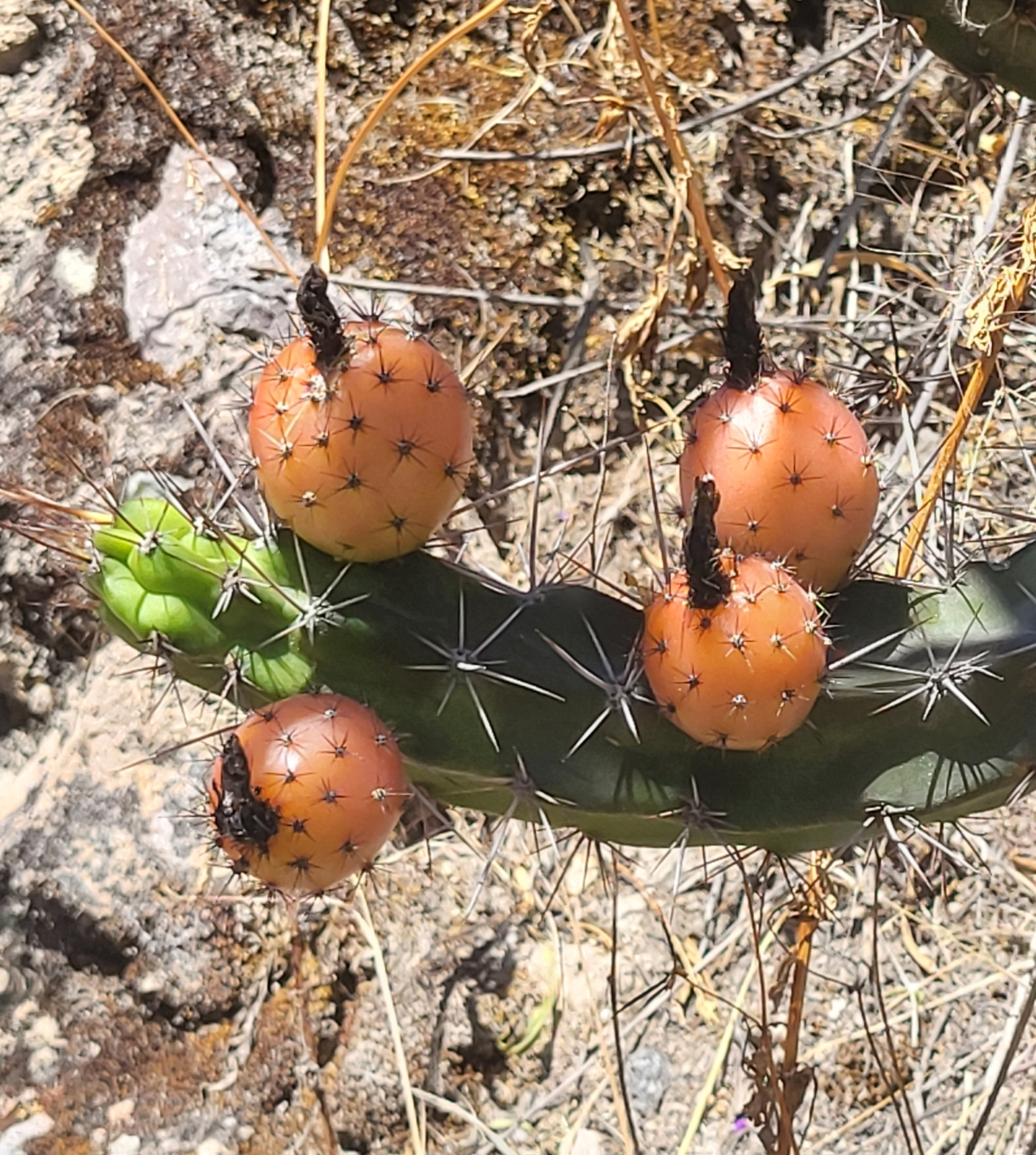
Fruits

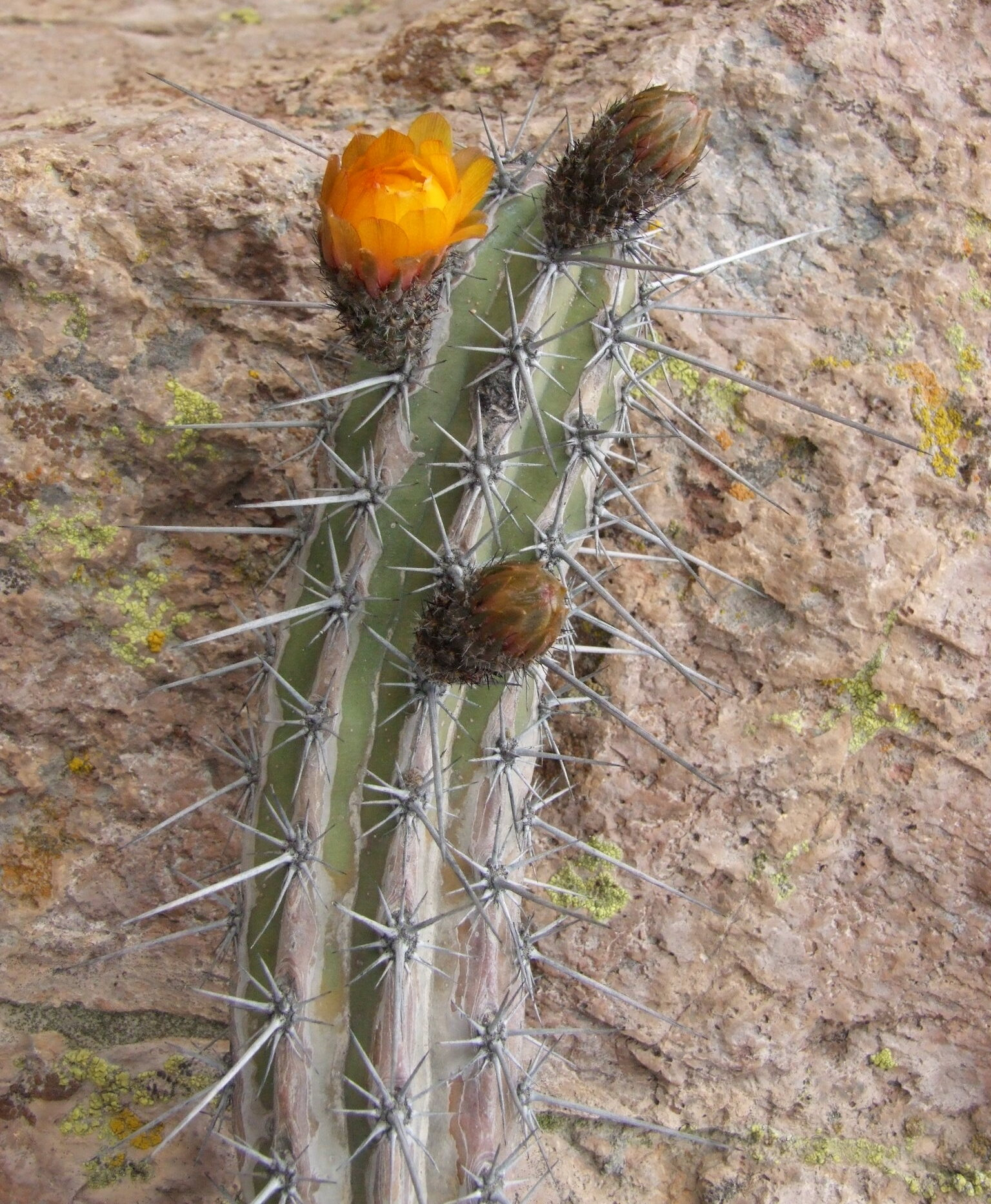
Buds and spines

== Distribution ==
This species is native to Peru, specifically the Arequipa department. It is widespread in this region and primarily inhabits desert or dry scrub biomes on hillsides at elevations between 2500 and 3500 meters above sea level.

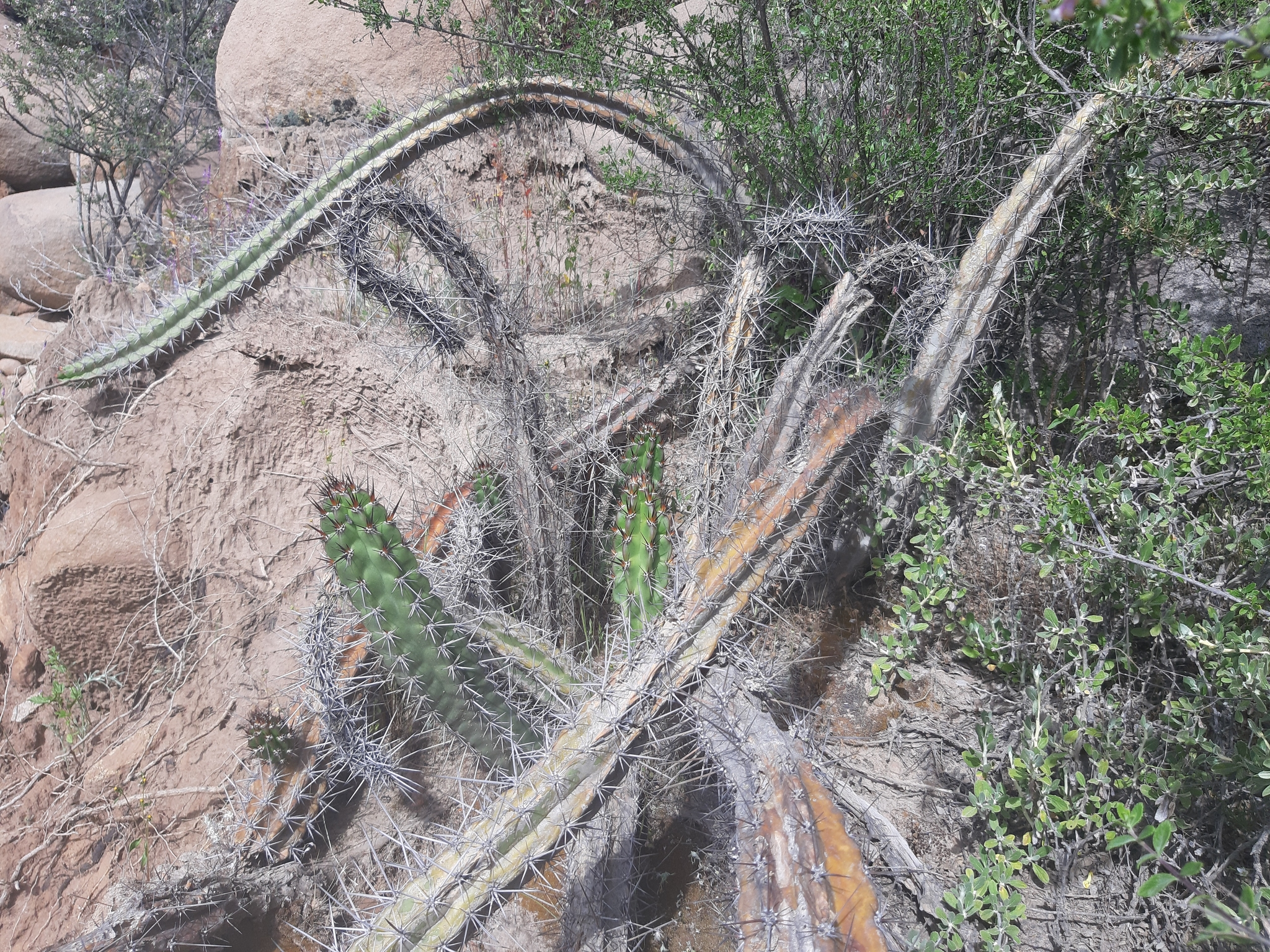
Habitat in Mollebaya, Peru

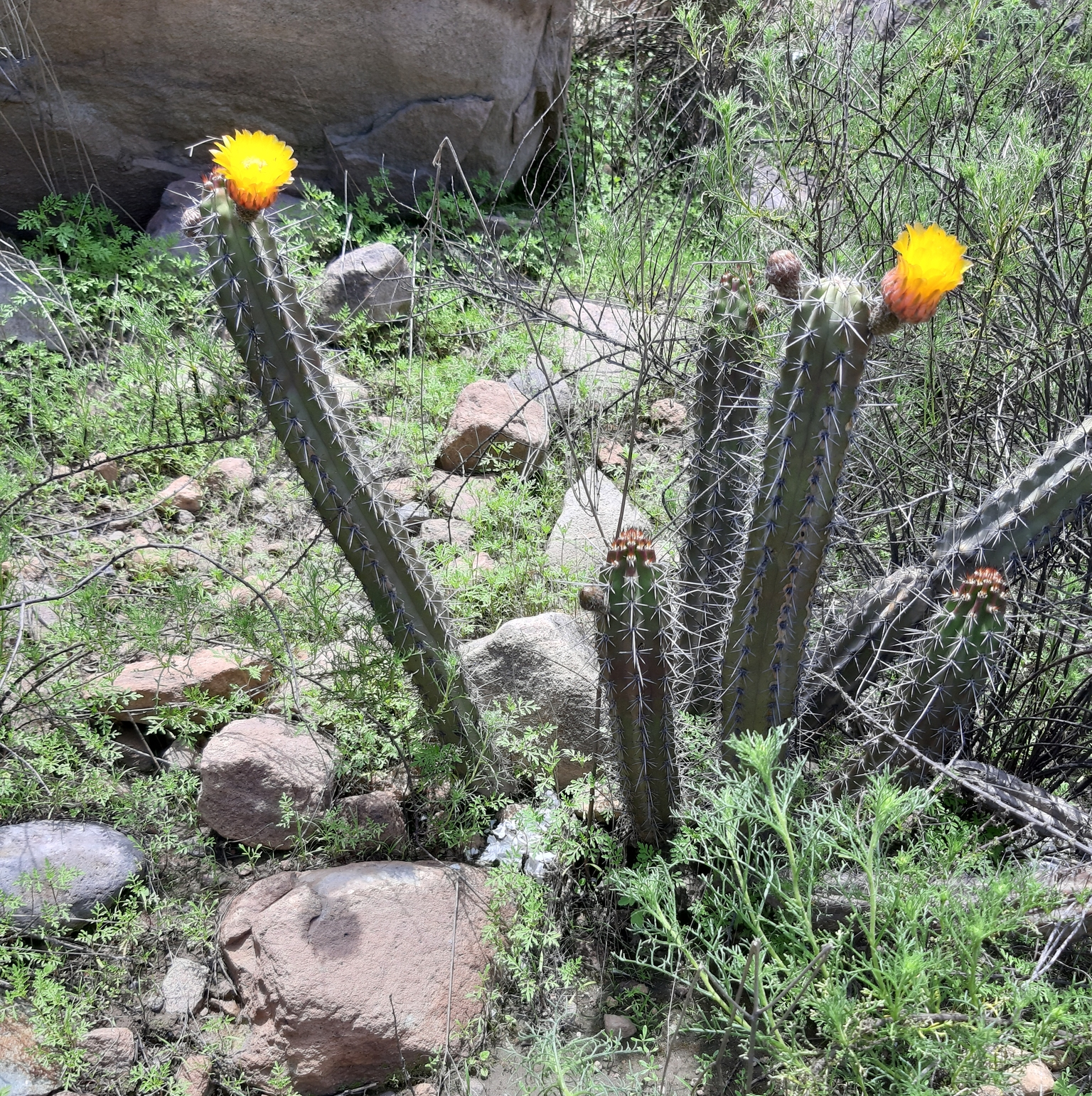
Plant blooming in Mollebaya, Peru

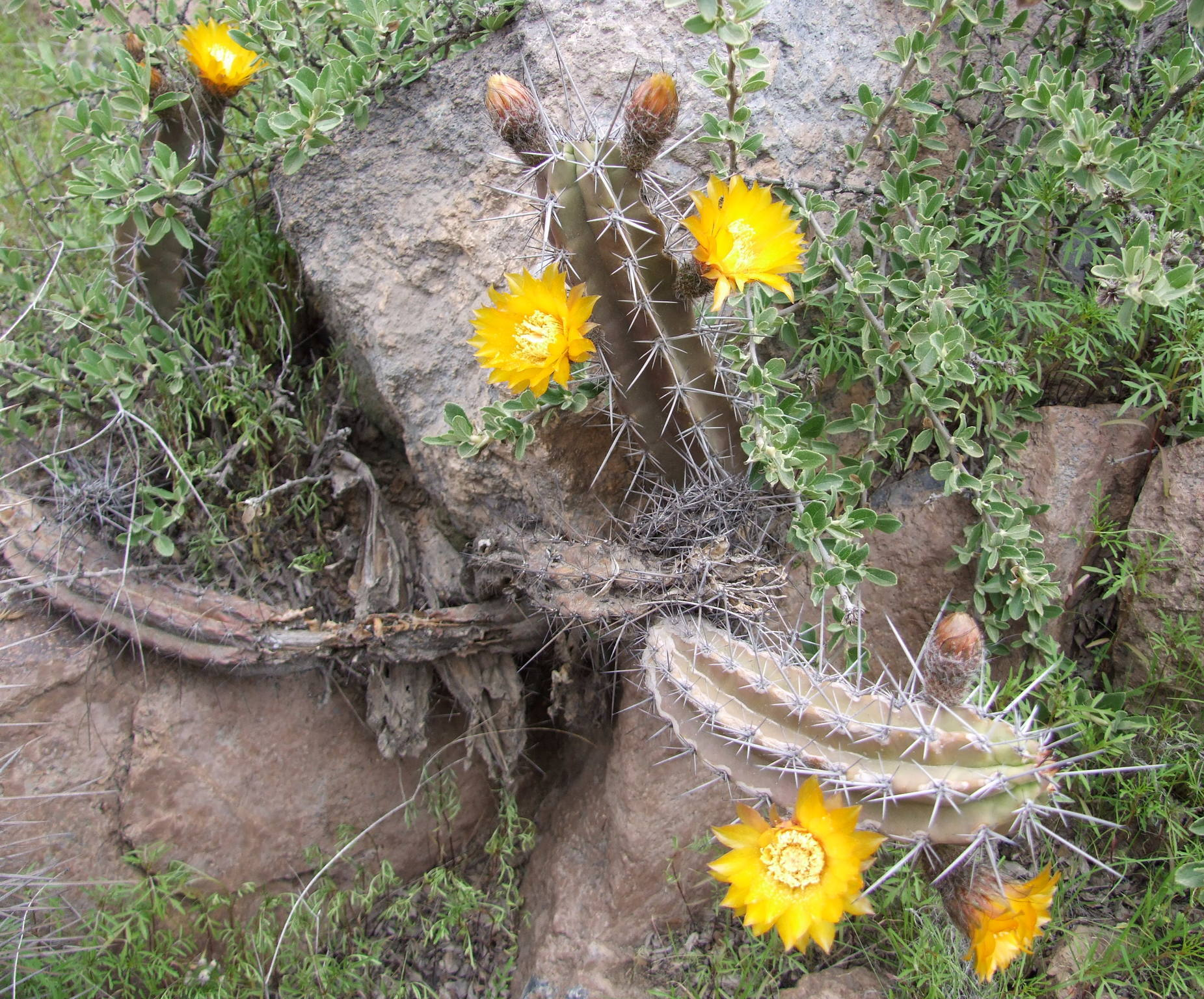
Blooming plant in Alto Selva Alegre, Peru

== Taxonomy ==
Corryocactus aureus was first described as Cactus aureus in 1834 by Franz Julius Ferdinand Meyen. The specific epithet "aureus" means "golden" or "golden yellow," referring to the color of the species' flowers. In 1963, Paul Clifford Hutchison transferred the species to the genus Corryocactus.
