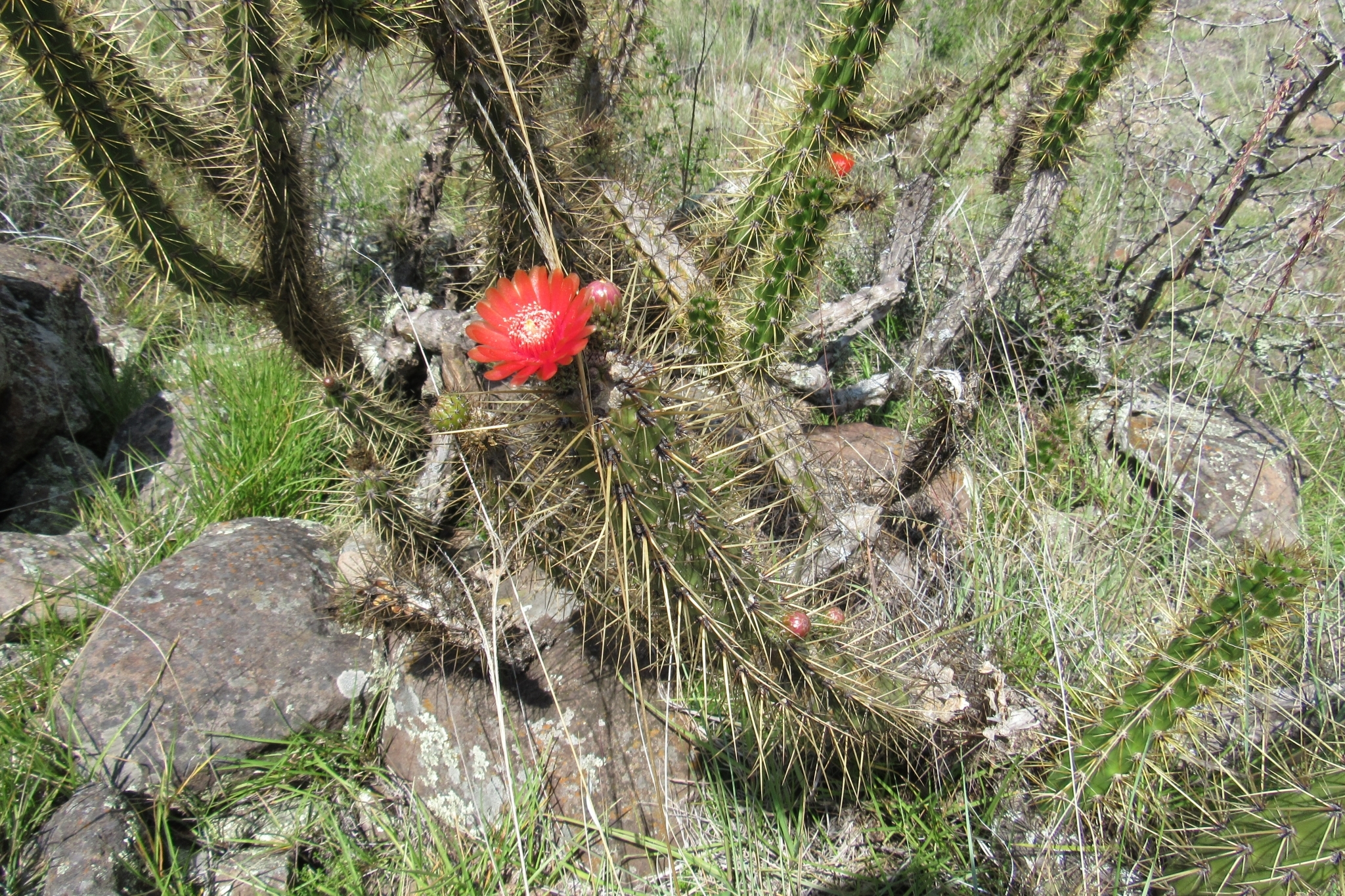

Conservation status
- Endangered (IUCN 3.1)

Scientific classification
- Kingdom: Plantae
- Clade: Tracheophytes
- Clade: Angiosperms
- Clade: Eudicots
- Order: Caryophyllales
- Family: Cactaceae
- Subfamily: Cactoideae
- Genus: Corryocactus
- Species: C. ayacuchoensis

Binomial name
- Corryocactus ayacuchoensis Rauh & Backeb. 1956 publ. 1957

Synonyms
- Corryocactus ayacuchoensis var. leucacanthus Rauh & Backeb. 1956 publ. 1957

= Corryocactus ayacuchoensis =

Species of cactus

Corryocactus ayacuchoensis is a species of Corryocactus found in Peru.

== Description ==
This species features upright stems that grow 1 to 2 meters tall and 5.5 to 6.5 centimeters in diameter. The stems branch profusely from the base and have 5 to 7 ribs. Areoles on these ribs bear white to yellowish-brown spines, including up to 3 central spines (3.5 to 5 cm long) and 8 to 10 radial spines (2 cm long). Orange-red flowers, measuring 4 to 5 centimeters long and up to 5 centimeters wide, bloom at the stem tips. The cactus produces greenish fruits, 2.5 to 3.5 centimeters in diameter, containing brownish-black seeds.

== Distribution ==
Corryocactus ayacuchoensis is a shrubby cactus native to Peru, found in desert or dry scrub biomes at altitudes between 2800 and 3350 meters.

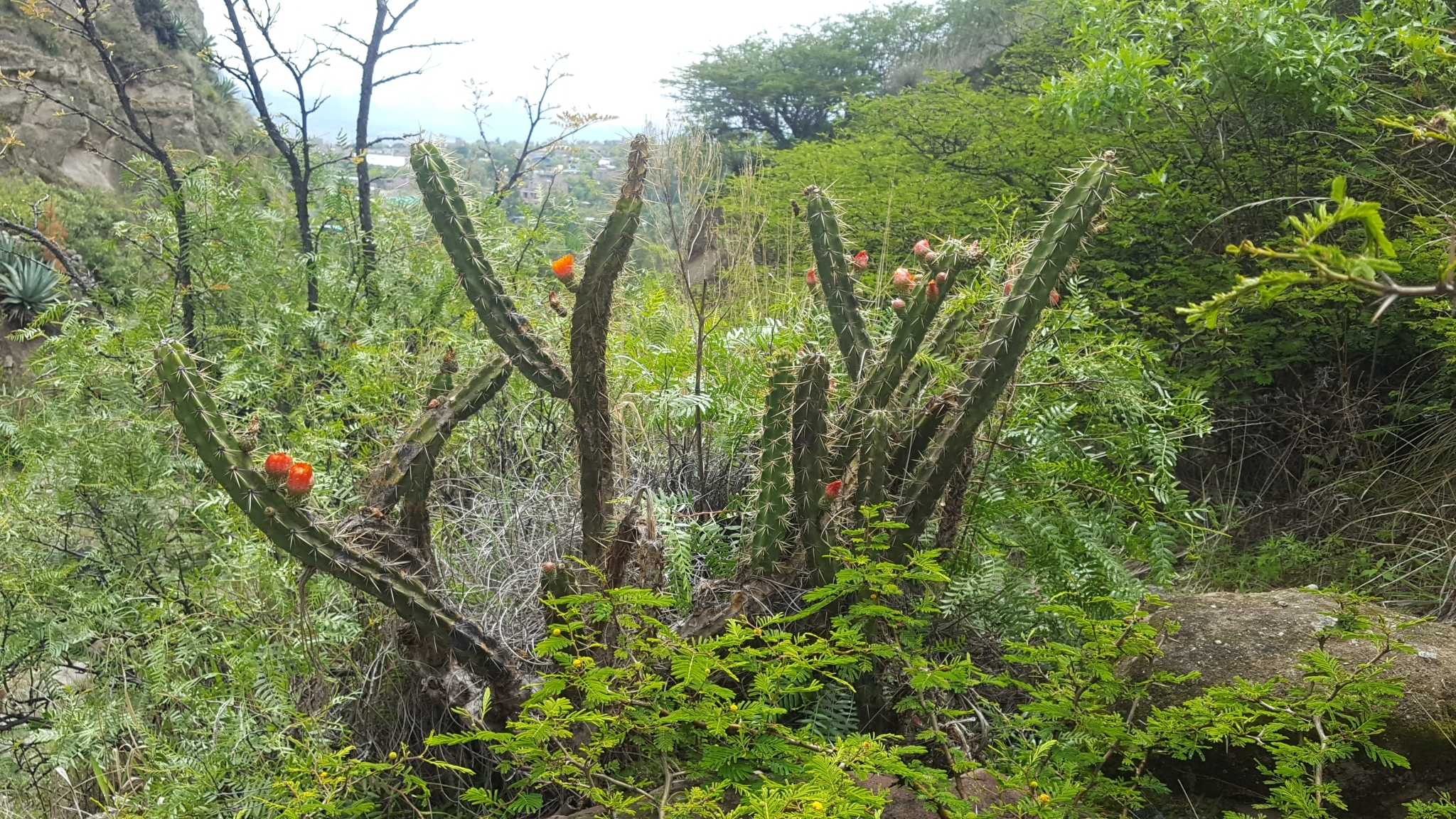
Habitat in Chuyayacu, Peru

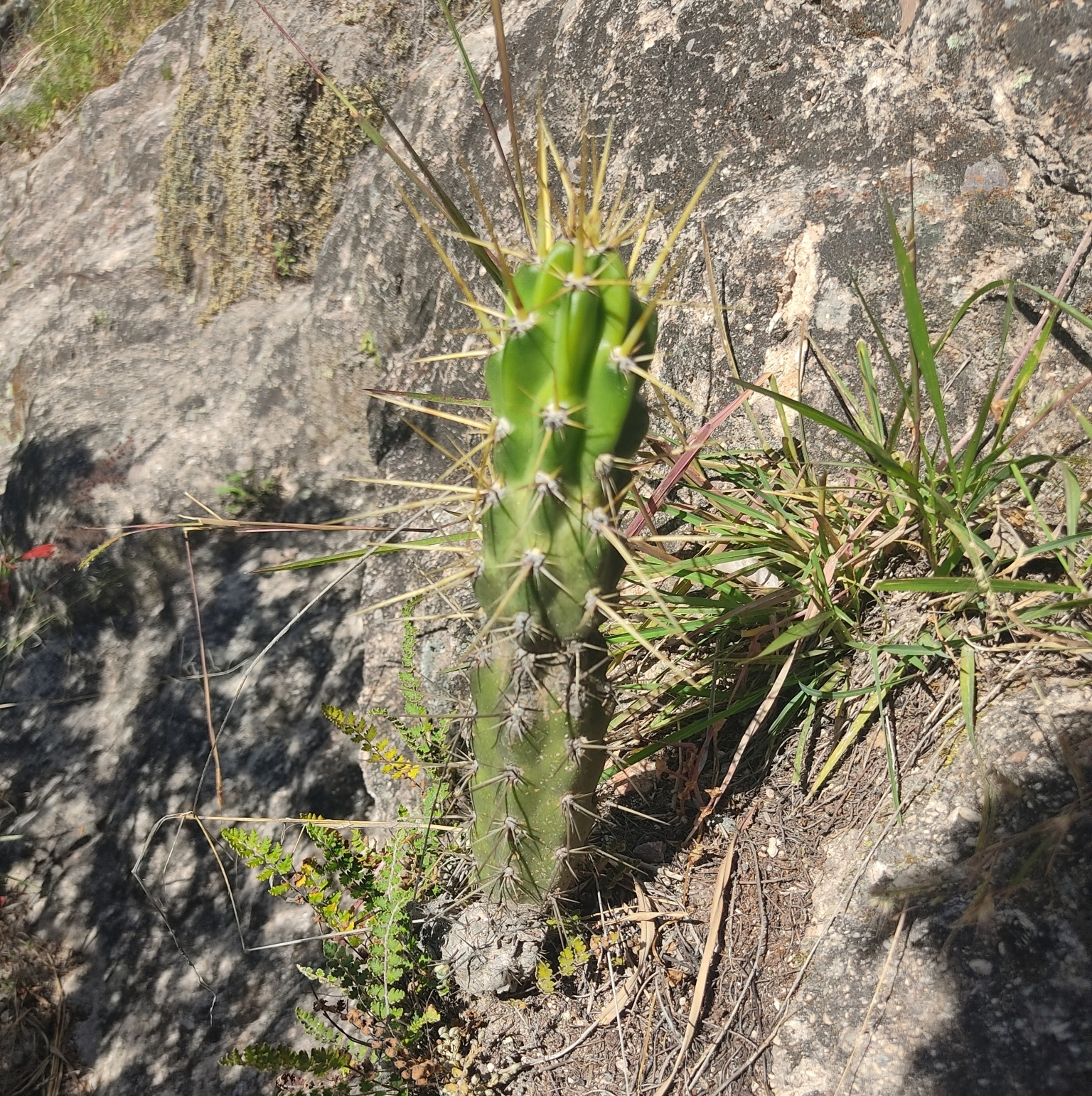
Solitary plant growing in Socapara, Peru

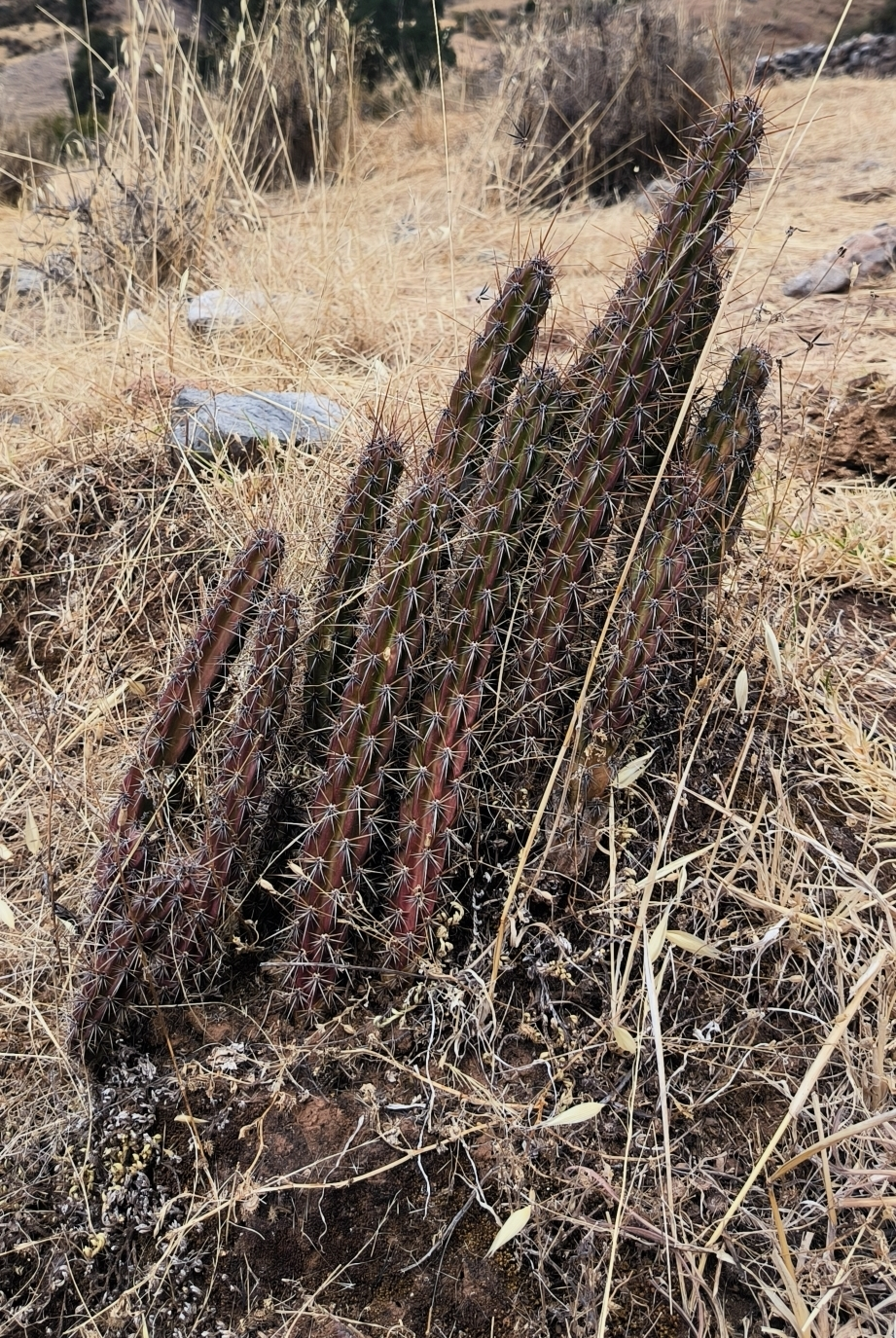
Plant in Canaria, Peru

== Taxonomy ==
First described by Werner Rauh and Curt Backeberg as Copiapoa ayacuchoensis in their 1956 publication, the specific epithet "ayacuchoensis" refers to the Peruvian department of Ayacucho, its native region.
