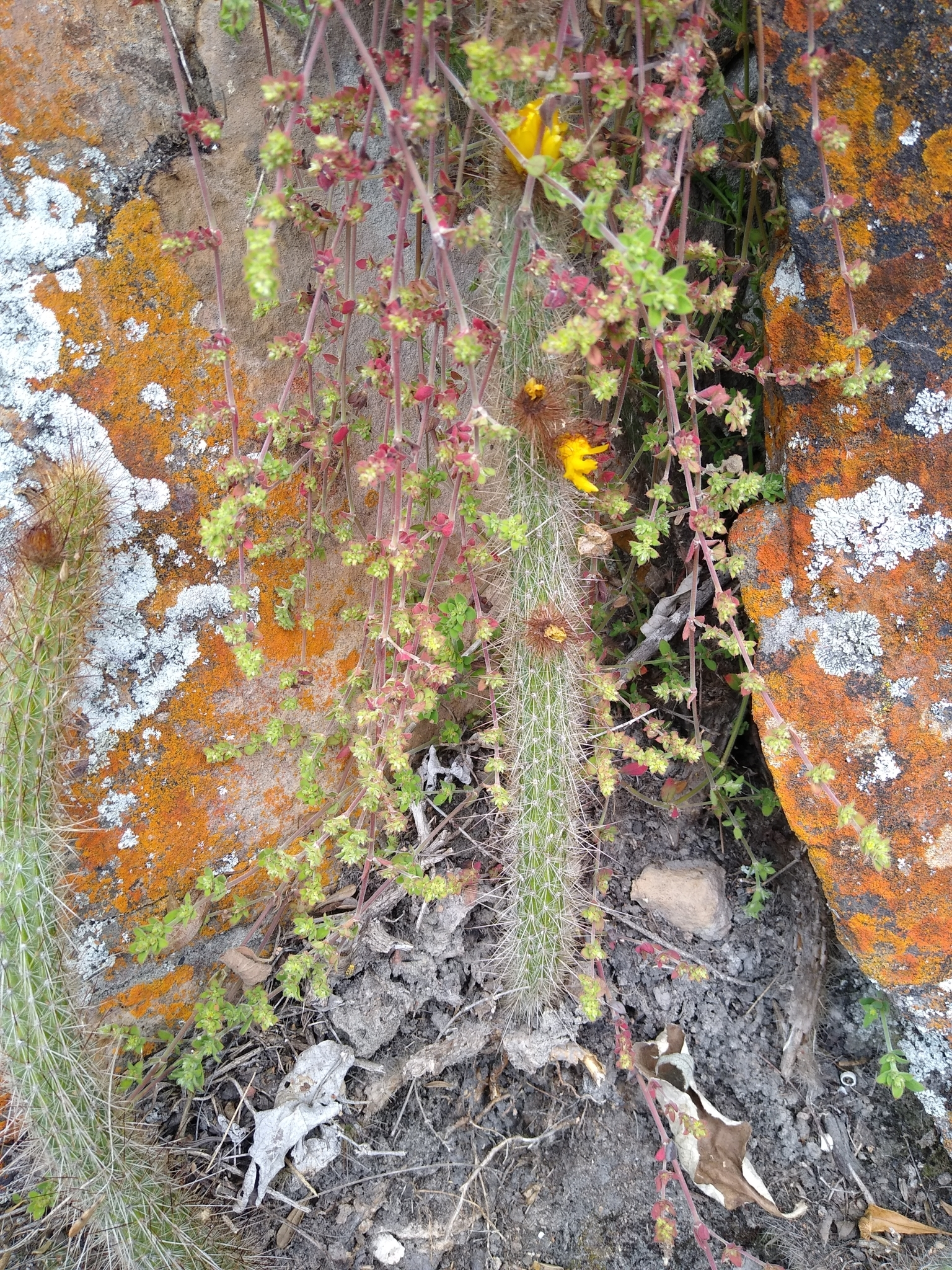

Conservation status
- Least Concern (IUCN 3.1)

Scientific classification
- Kingdom: Plantae
- Clade: Tracheophytes
- Clade: Angiosperms
- Clade: Eudicots
- Order: Caryophyllales
- Family: Cactaceae
- Subfamily: Cactoideae
- Genus: Corryocactus
- Species: C. chachapoyensis

Binomial name
- Corryocactus chachapoyensis Ochoa & Backeb. ex D.R.Hunt, 1999

Synonyms
- Cereus chachapoyensis Ochoa & Backeb. 1959

= Corryocactus chachapoyensis =

Species of cactus

Corryocactus chachapoyensis is a species of Corryocactus found in Peru.

== Description ==
Corryocactus chachapoyensis is a profusely branching shrubby cactus with green stems reach 60-80 cm in length and up to 2 cm in diameter. The stems feature 8-13 ribs bearing areoles with yellowish-white spines. A single central spine is longer and thicker than the radial spines. The cactus produces yellow flowers measuring 2-4.5 cm in both length and diameter.

== Distribution ==
Corryocactus chachapoyensis is found in desert or dry scrub biomes of the Peruvian Amazon region at altitudes between 1650 and 2500 meters.

== Taxonomy ==
It was first described in 1999 by botanists Carlos Ochoa Nieves, Curt Backeberg, and David Richard Hunt in the journal Cactaceae Consensus Initiatives. The species name refers to its occurrence near the Peruvian city of Chachapoyas.
