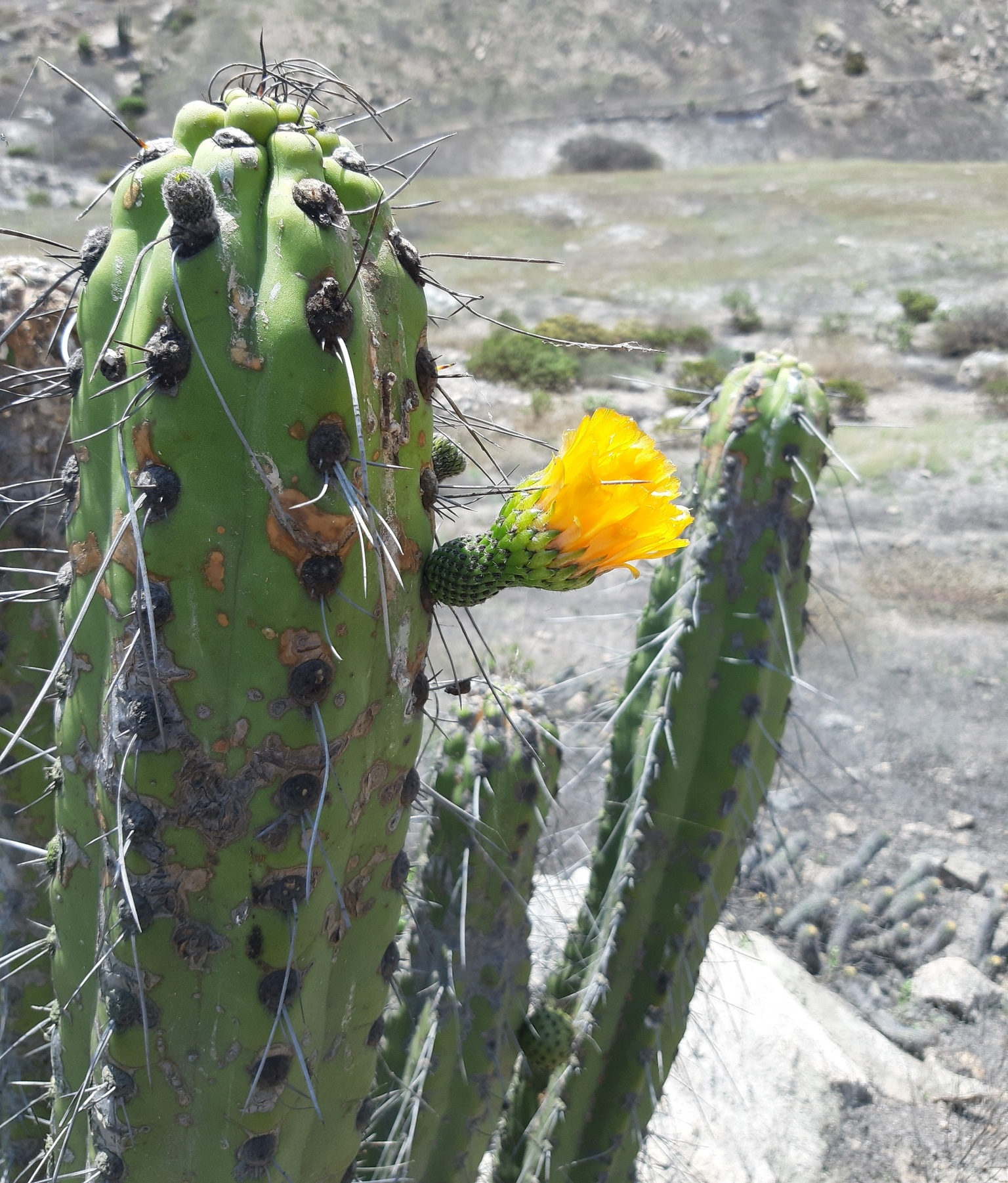

Conservation status
- Endangered (IUCN 3.1)

Scientific classification
- Kingdom: Plantae
- Clade: Tracheophytes
- Clade: Angiosperms
- Clade: Eudicots
- Order: Caryophyllales
- Family: Cactaceae
- Subfamily: Cactoideae
- Genus: Corryocactus
- Species: C. brachypetalus

Binomial name
- Corryocactus brachypetalus (Vaupel) Britton & Rose, 1920

Synonyms
- Cereus brachypetalus Vaupel 1913

= Corryocactus brachypetalus =

Species of cactus

Corryocactus brachypetalus is a species of Corryocactus found in Peru.

== Description ==
This cactus forms large clumps with numerous, erect stems that branch profusely from the base, reaching heights of 2 to 4 meters. The dull green stems are 6 to 10 centimeters in diameter and feature seven to eight prominent ribs. Each areole bears up to 20 spines, which are initially black and lighten with age. These spines are occasionally twisted and generally shorter than 1 centimeter, though one or more can grow to 10 to 16 centimeters long.

The plant produces broadly funnel-shaped flowers, measuring 4 to 6 centimeters in diameter, with a deep orange to orange-red color. Its fruits are spherical, greenish-yellow, and spiny when immature, reaching 6 to 7 centimeters in diameter. These fruits contain opaque seeds approximately 1.5 mm long.

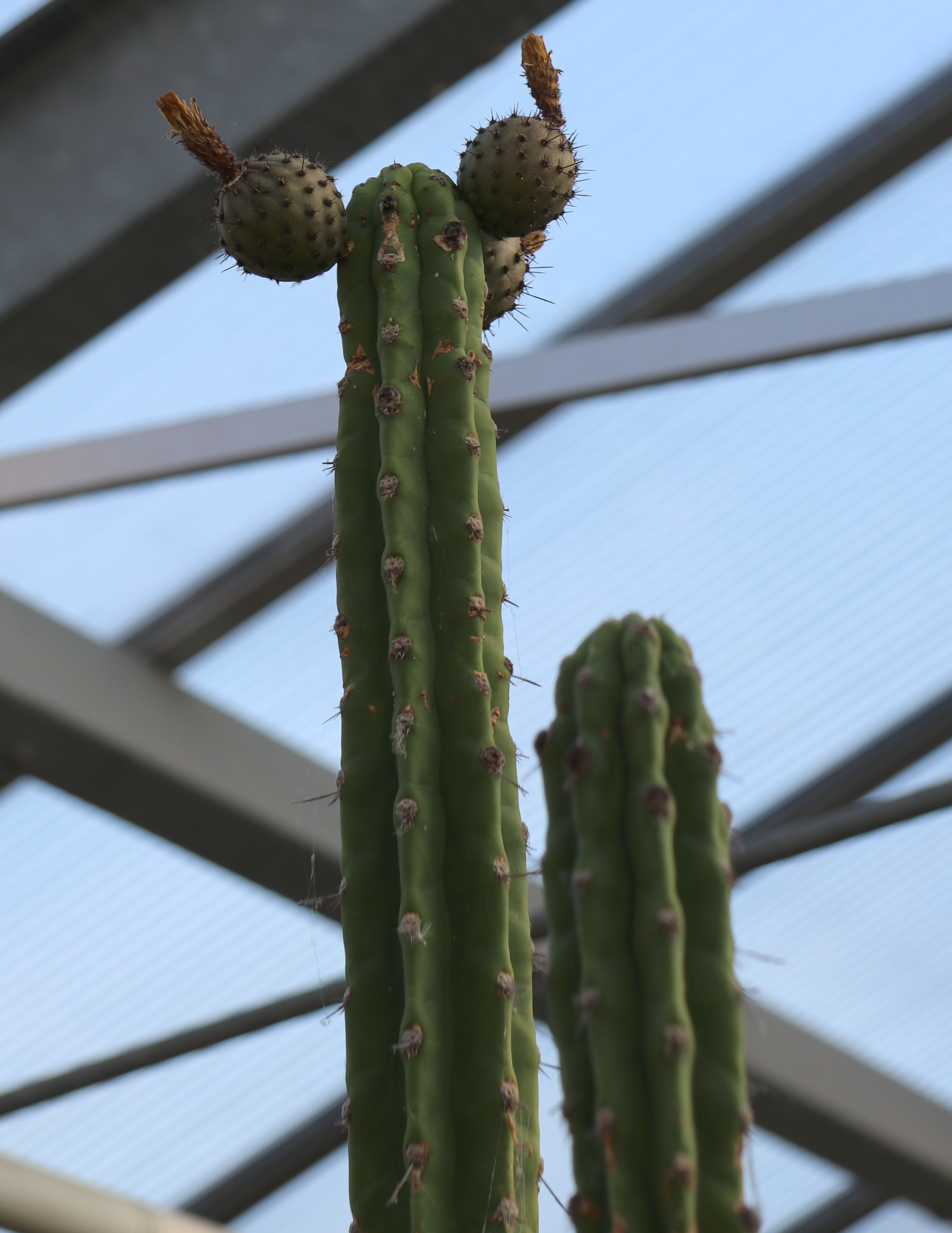
Fruits

== Distribution ==
Corryocactus brachypetalus is a shrubby cactus species native to the Arequipa region of Peru, where it thrives in desert and dry scrub biomes at elevations between 50 and 600 meters.

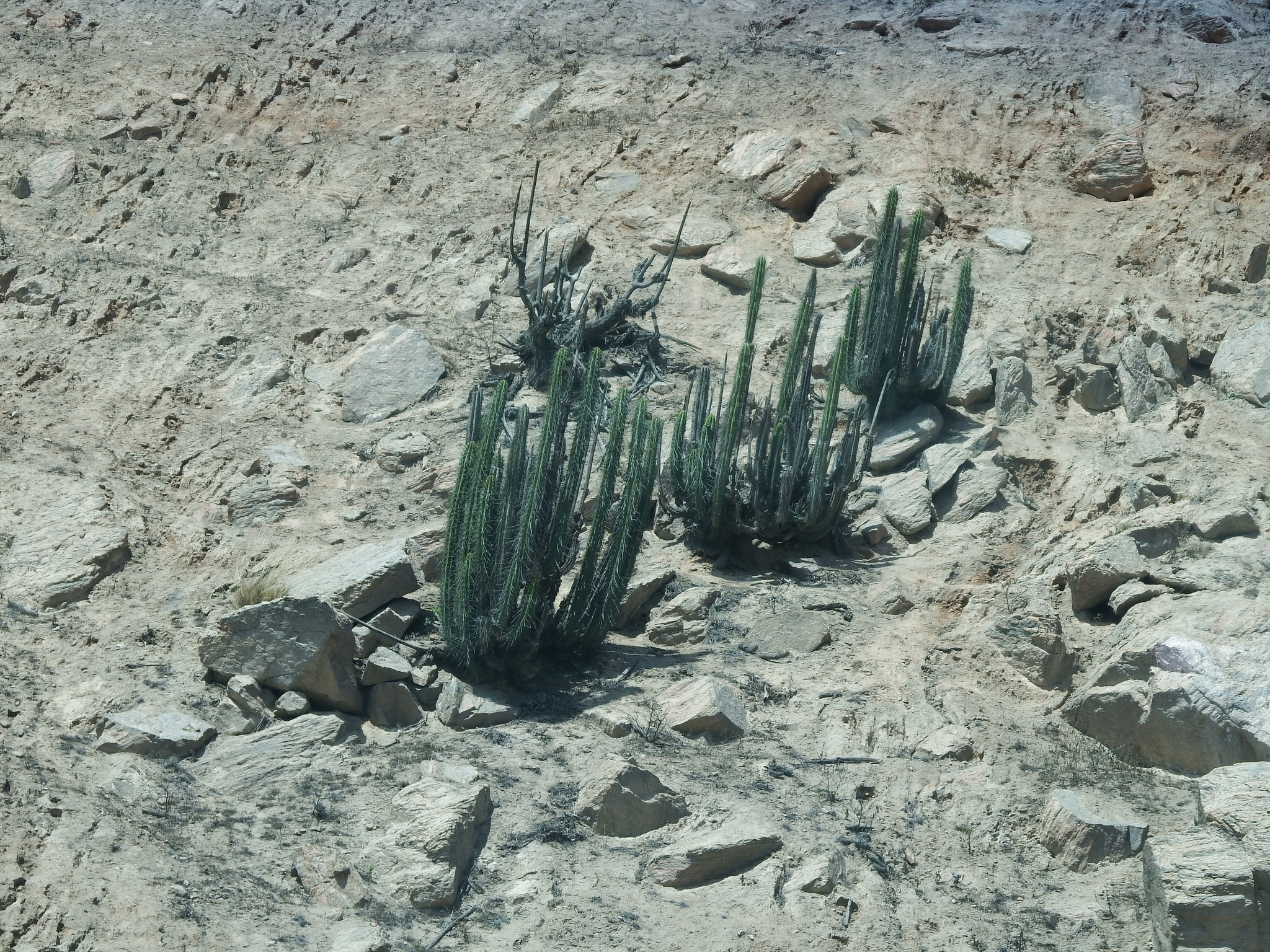
Habitat in Mollendo, Peru

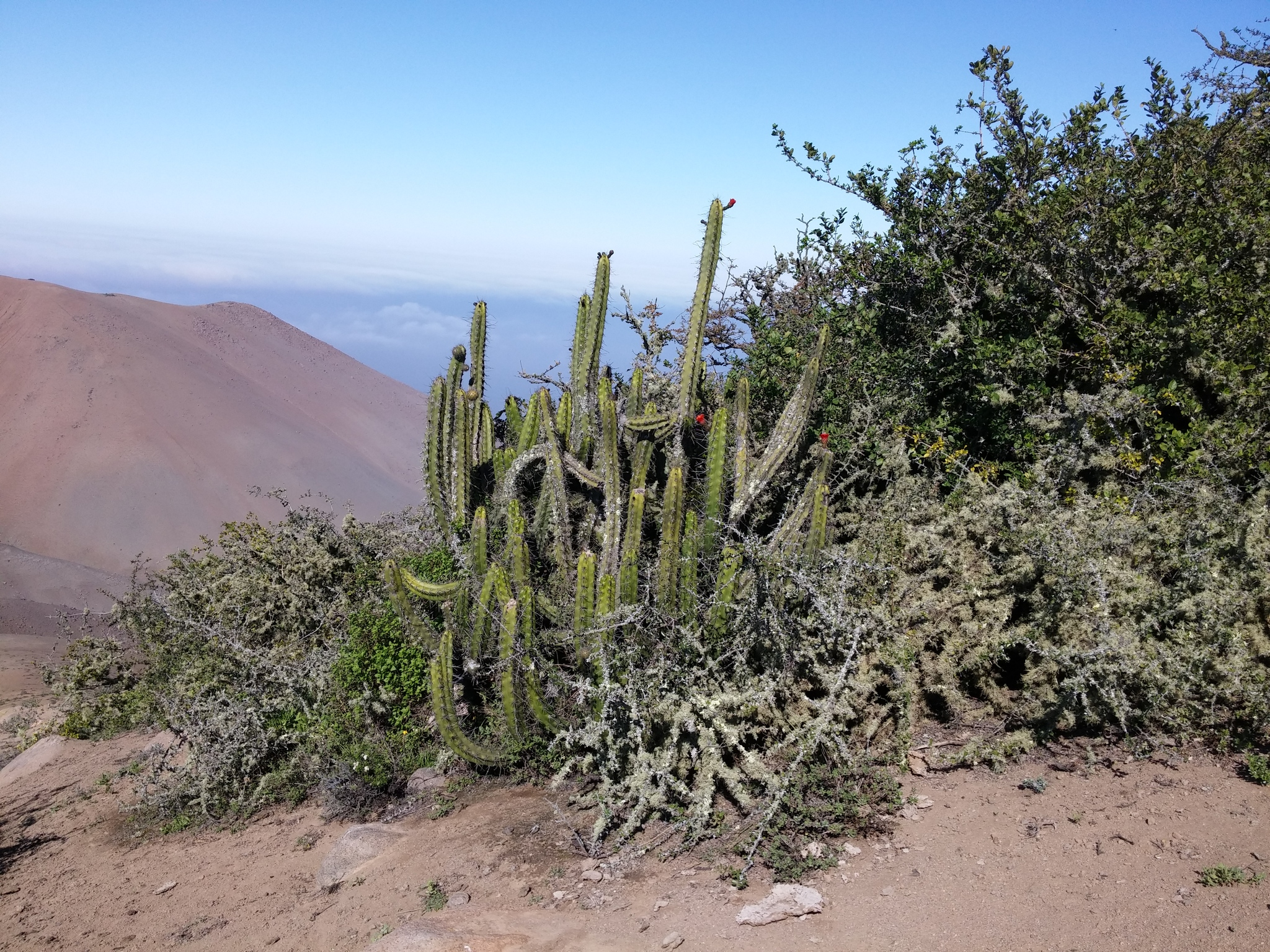
Habitat in Chala, Peru

== Taxonomy ==
Corryocactus brachypetalus was first described as Cereus brachypetalus in 1913 by Friedrich Karl Johann Vaupel. In 1920, Nathaniel Lord Britton and Joseph Nelson Rose reclassified it under the genus Corryocactus. The specific epithet "brachypetalus" originates from the Greek words brachys (short) and petalon (petal), referencing the short petals characteristic of the species' flowers.
