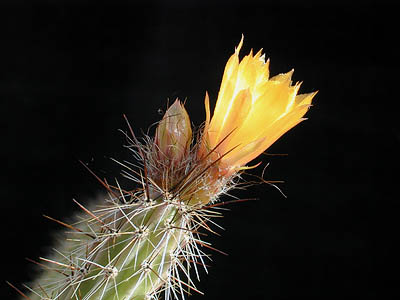

Scientific classification
- Kingdom: Plantae
- Clade: Tracheophytes
- Clade: Angiosperms
- Clade: Eudicots
- Order: Caryophyllales
- Family: Cactaceae
- Subfamily: Cactoideae
- Genus: Corryocactus
- Species: C. squarrosus

Binomial name
- Corryocactus squarrosus (Vaupel) Hutchison, 1963

Synonyms
- Cereus squarrosus Vaupel 913; Erdisia squarrosa (Vaupel) Britton & Rose 1920; Corryocactus chavinilloensis F.Ritter 1981; Corryocactus gracilis F.Ritter 1981; Corryocactus odoratus F.Ritter 1981; Corryocactus pyroporphyranthus F.Ritter 1981; Corryocactus quivillanus F.Ritter 1981

= Corryocactus squarrosus =

Species of cactus

Corryocactus squarrosus is a species of Corryocactus found in Peru.

== Description ==
This species features prostrate or slightly ascending, cylindrical stems that branch from the base. The dark green stems grow 1 to 2 meters long and 2 to 2.5 cm (0.79 to 0.98 in) in diameter, supported by a taproot. The stems have 7 to 8 obtuse, notched ribs bearing areoles. These areoles contain yellowish, horn-colored spines that are uneven and thickened at their base. Each areole has one central spine up to 3 cm (1.2 in) long and 9 to 10 radial spines measuring 1.2 cm (0.47 in). Corryocactus squarrosus produces light red to orange-yellow flowers up to 4.5 cm (1.8 in) long. Its fleshy fruit is 2.5 cm (0.98 in) long and 1.7 cm (0.67 in) in diameter, containing numerous black seeds.

== Distribution ==
Corryocactus squarrosus is a shrubby cactus native to Peru, found in desert and dry scrub biomes between 2200 and 4200 meters in elevation.

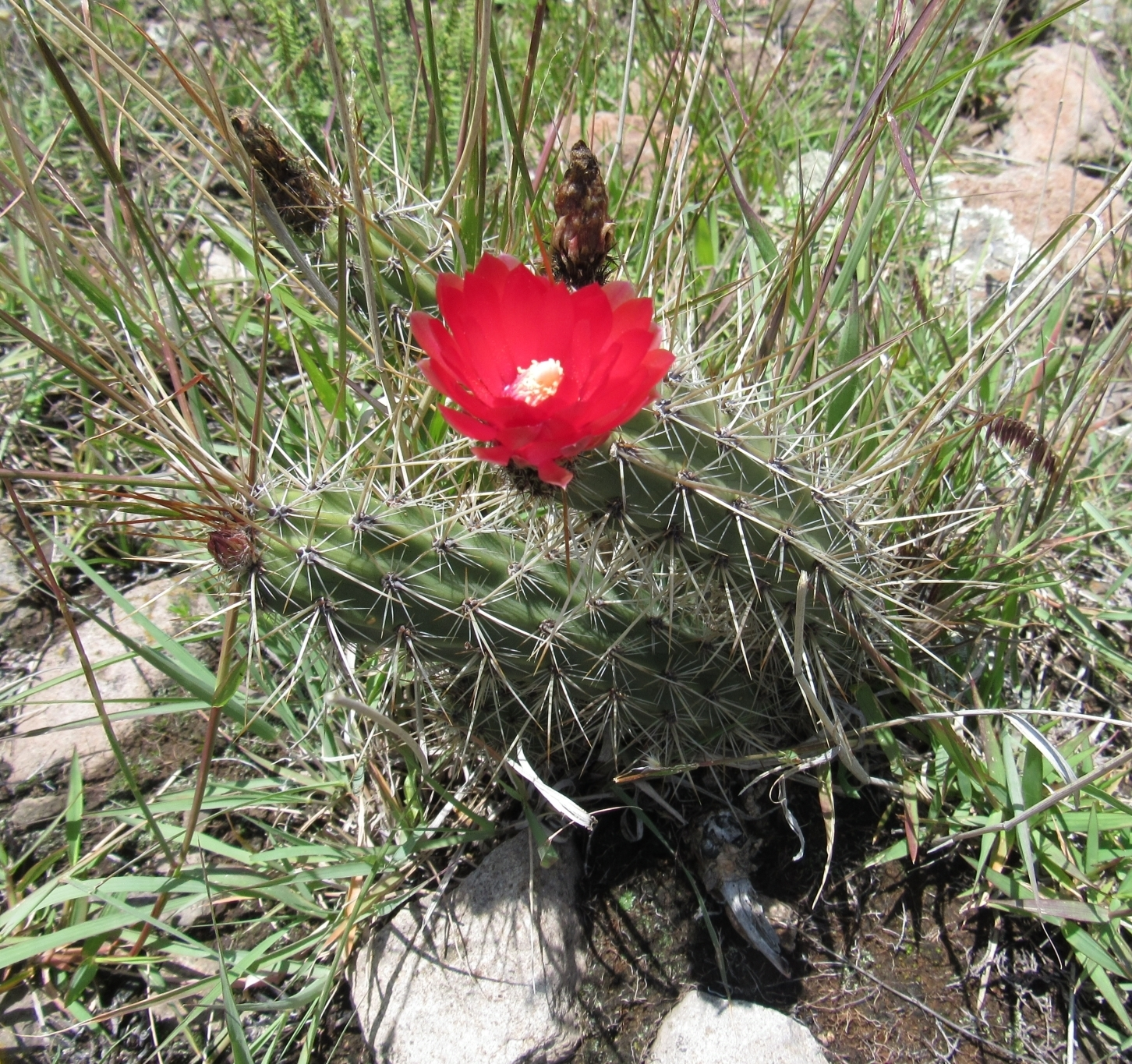
Plants growing in Ayacucho, Perú

== Taxonomy ==
Originally described as Cereus squarrosus by Friedrich Karl Johann Vaupel in 1913, the species was later reclassified into the genus Corryocactus by Paul Clifford Hutchison in 1963. The specific epithet "squarrosus" is Latin for 'crusty' or 'scaly,' referring to the overlapping, lanceolate scales on the flower ovaries.
