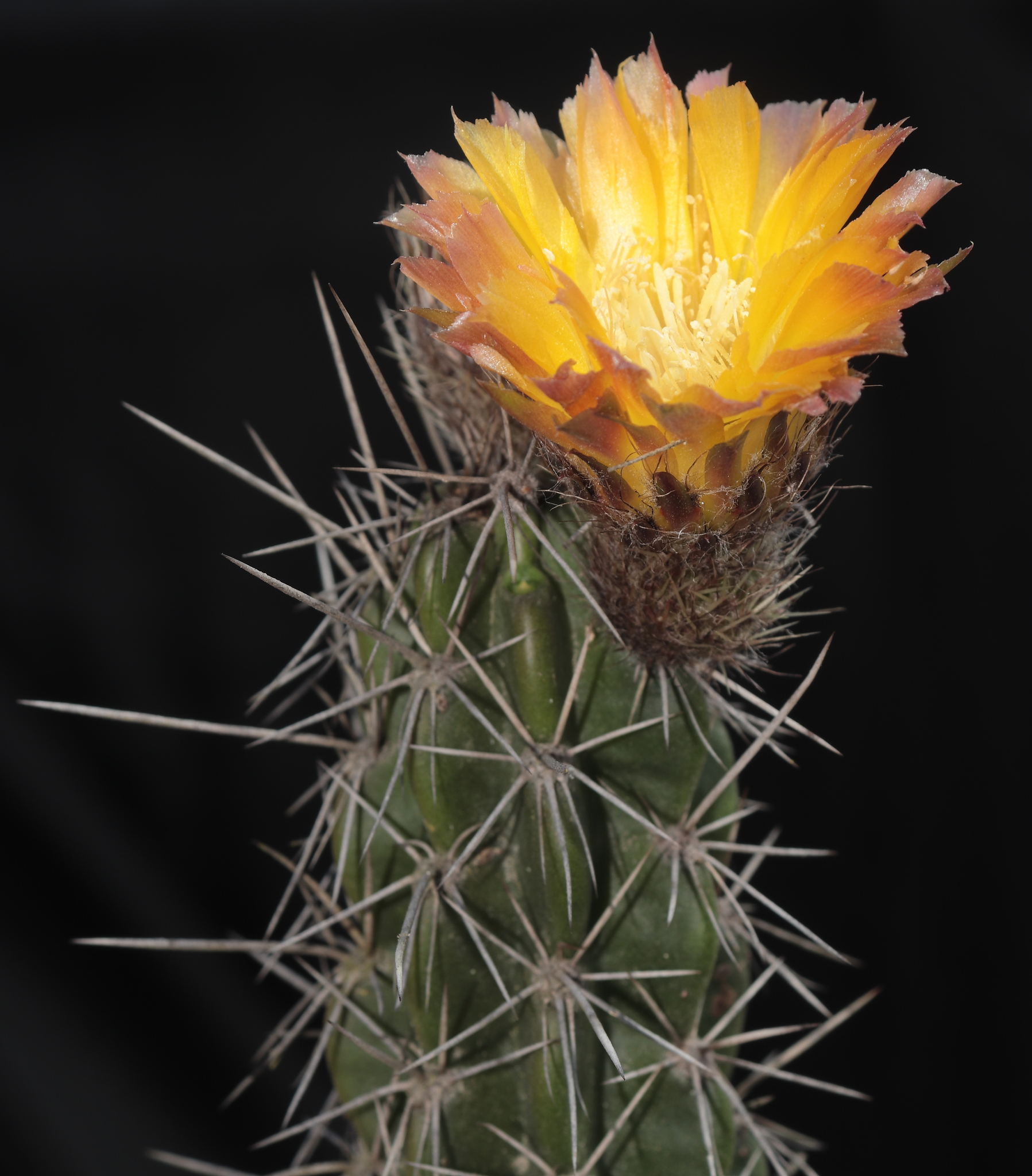

Scientific classification
- Kingdom: Plantae
- Clade: Tracheophytes
- Clade: Angiosperms
- Clade: Eudicots
- Order: Caryophyllales
- Family: Cactaceae
- Subfamily: Cactoideae
- Genus: Corryocactus
- Species: C. dillonii

Binomial name
- Corryocactus dillonii A.Pauca & Quip. 2015

= Corryocactus dillonii =

Species of cactus

Corryocactus dillonii is a species of Corryocactus found in Peru.

== Description ==
This species is characterized by its branching habit, primarily from the base, though occasional plants may have only one or two branches. The stems are upright, fragile, and measure up to 24 cm (9.4 in) tall and 2.4 to 3.5 cm (0.94 to 1.38 in) in diameter. During the dry season, the epidermis turns brown (sometimes purplish) and growth ceases. In the wet season, stems swell, become olive-green, and new branches emerge. The cactus possesses a yellowish-white, rhizome-like root. The stems have 6 to 7 ribs, each 0.7 to 1.2 cm (0.28 to 0.47 in) high, bearing areoles. These are circular, 3.1 to 3.7 mm (0.12 to 0.15 in) in diameter, and spaced 11.3 to 15.8 mm (0.44 to 0.62 in) apart. The areoles are covered in yellowish-white to gray felt and, when young, bear small, deltoid, greenish-purple scales. Spines are straight and yellow when young, aging to gray. There are 1 to 3 central spines (1.8 to 3.4 cm (0.71 to 1.34 in) long) and 8 to 12 radial spines (0.7 to 1.1 cm (0.28 to 0.43 in) long). Flowers are subterminal, diurnal, and actinomorphic, measuring 3.5 to 5.6 cm (1.4 to 2.2 in) in diameter and 3.5 to 4.1 cm (1.4 to 1.6 in) in length. They are orange-yellow with a brownish-green pericarp. Blooming occurs at the end of the wet season (November-December), with pollination carried out by insects like beetles and hymenoptera. Fruits are spherical, reddish, and up to 2.1 cm (0.83 in) in diameter, with a sour taste. They contain dark brown, rough-surfaced seeds measuring 0.77 to 0.91 mm (0.030 to 0.036 in) wide and 1.54 to 1.79 mm (0.061 to 0.070 in) long.

== Distribution ==
Corryocactus dillonii is a shrubby cactus native to Peru, found in desert and dry scrub biomes between 850 and 900 meters elevation. It typically grows on sandy, slightly sloped ground, favoring the leeward side of hills.

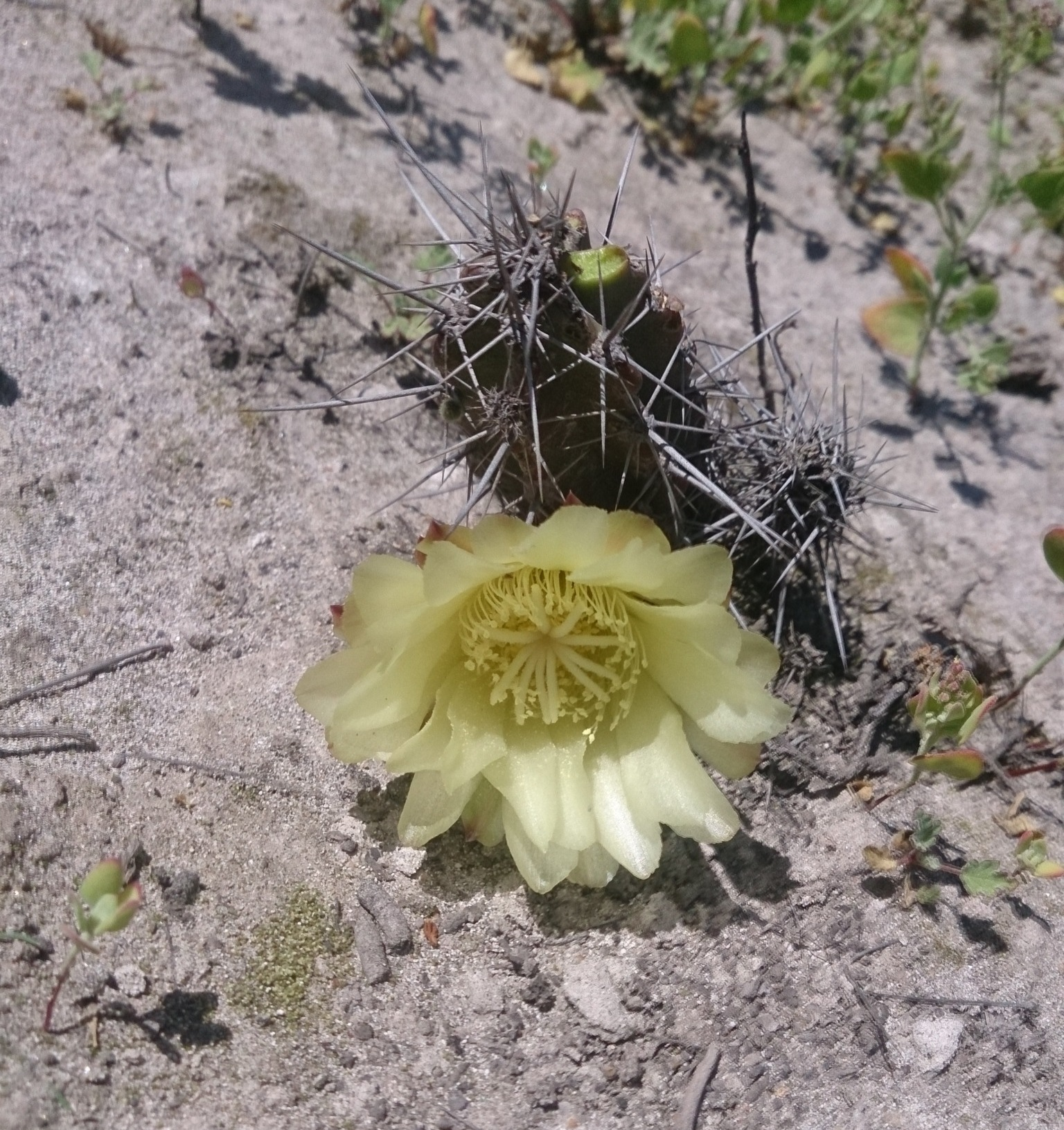
Plant growing in habitat in Matarani, Peru

== Taxonomy ==
Corryocactus dillonii was first described as Copiapoa dillonii by A. Pauca and V. Quipuscoa in Arnaldoa 22: 315 (2015). The specific epithet honors Dr. Michael Owen Dillon for his contributions to the study of Peruvian and Chilean flora.
