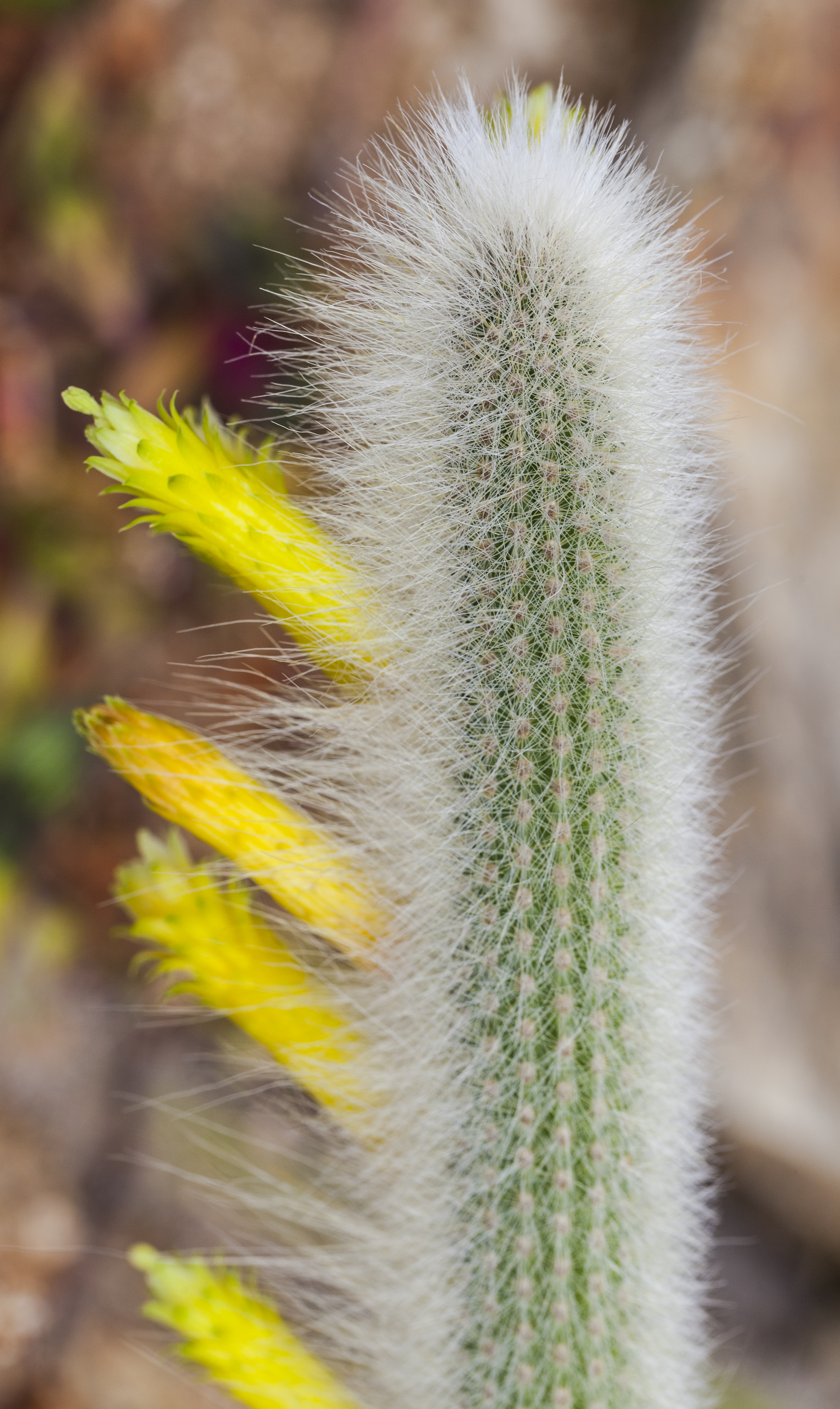

Conservation status
- Least Concern (IUCN 3.1)

Scientific classification
- Kingdom: Plantae
- Clade: Embryophytes
- Clade: Tracheophytes
- Clade: Spermatophytes
- Clade: Angiosperms
- Clade: Eudicots
- Order: Caryophyllales
- Family: Cactaceae
- Subfamily: Cactoideae
- Genus: Cleistocactus
- Species: C. ritteri

Binomial name
- Cleistocactus ritteri Backeb. ex Guiggi 2020

Synonyms
- Cephalocleistocactus ritteri (Backeb.) Backeb. 1962; Cleistocactus ritteri Backeb. 1959

= Cleistocactus ritteri =

Species of cactus

Cleistocactus ritteri is a species of Cleistocactus found in Bolivia.

== Description ==
Cleistocactus ritteri grows as a shrub with more or less upright, bright green shoots that are branched at the base and reaches heights of 1 to 2 meter with a diameter of 2 to 3 centimeters. There are 12 to 14 ribs. The brown areoles on it later turn white and 5 mm apart. The 5 yellowish central spines are up to 10 millimeters long. The up to 30 fine radial spines are white and 6–8mm long.

The tubular, greenish-yellow to lemon-yellow flowers are slightly downward-pointing and barely curved that blooms from the areoles near the apex of the stems. They are up to 3–4 centimeters long and 5 mm wide. The spherical, green to yellow fruits reach a diameter of up to 1.5 centimeters. Seeds are black pyriform and 0.8 mm long.

== Distribution ==
Cleistocactus ritteri is found beneath trees and shrubs in loamy soil of the Bolivian department of La Paz in the Yungas at altitudes of 2700 to 3000 meters.

== Taxonomy ==
The first description was made in 1959 by Curt Backeberg who named the plant after Friedrich Ritter. A nomenclature synonym is Cephalocleistocactus ritteri (Backeb.) Backeb. (1962).

In the IUCN Red List of Threatened Species, the species is listed as "Least Concern (LC)". H. listed as not endangered.
