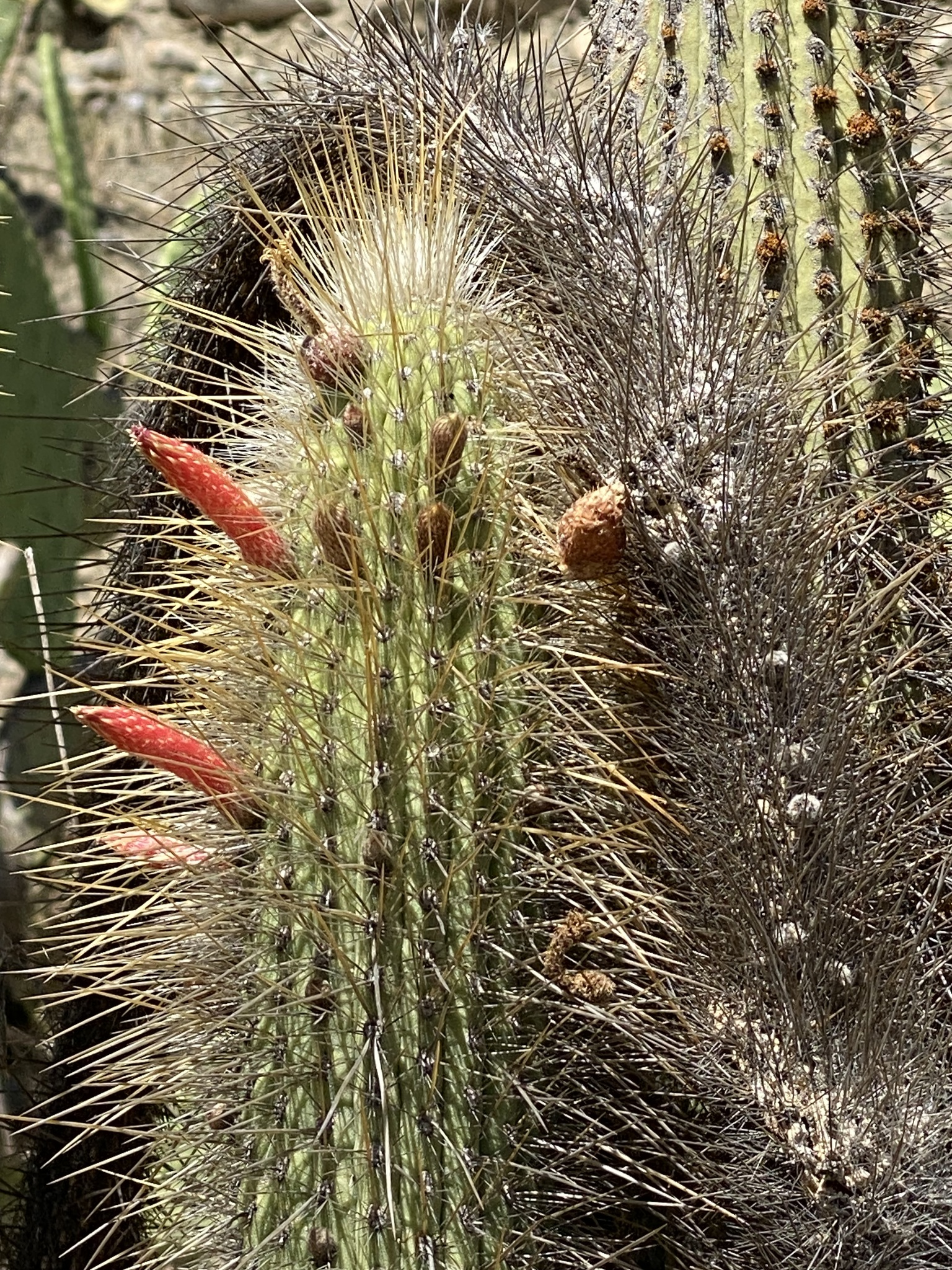

Conservation status
- Least Concern (IUCN 3.1)

Scientific classification
- Kingdom: Plantae
- Clade: Tracheophytes
- Clade: Angiosperms
- Clade: Eudicots
- Order: Caryophyllales
- Family: Cactaceae
- Subfamily: Cactoideae
- Genus: Cleistocactus
- Species: C. luribayensis

Binomial name
- Cleistocactus luribayensis Cárdenas

= Cleistocactus luribayensis =

Species of cactus

Cleistocactus luribayensis is a species of columnar cacti in the genus Cleistocactus.

== Description ==
Cleistocactus luribayensis grows tree-shaped with several upright, gray-green shoots that taper towards the tip and reaches heights of 2 to 3 meters with diameters of 4 to 6 cm (1.6 to 2.4 in). There are about 19 wide ribs with transverse grooves. The gray areoles on it are up to 1 cm (0.39 in) apart. Of the 16 to 22 needle-like, light brown, yellow to whitish, spreading and 5 to 15 mm (0.20 to 0.59 in) long spines, three are occasionally arranged in the middle. There are one to two central spines.

The tubular, straight, pink flowers are up to 3 cm (1.2 in) long and have a diameter of 0.5 cm (0.20 in). The inner flower bracts are salmon pink in color. The salmon-pink colored fruits are up to 2 cm (0.79 in) in diameter.

== Distribution ==
Cleistocactus luribayensis is found in the montane dry forest in the Bolivian department of La Paz, specifically in the provinces of Murillo and Loayza at altitudes of 2600 to 3600 meters.

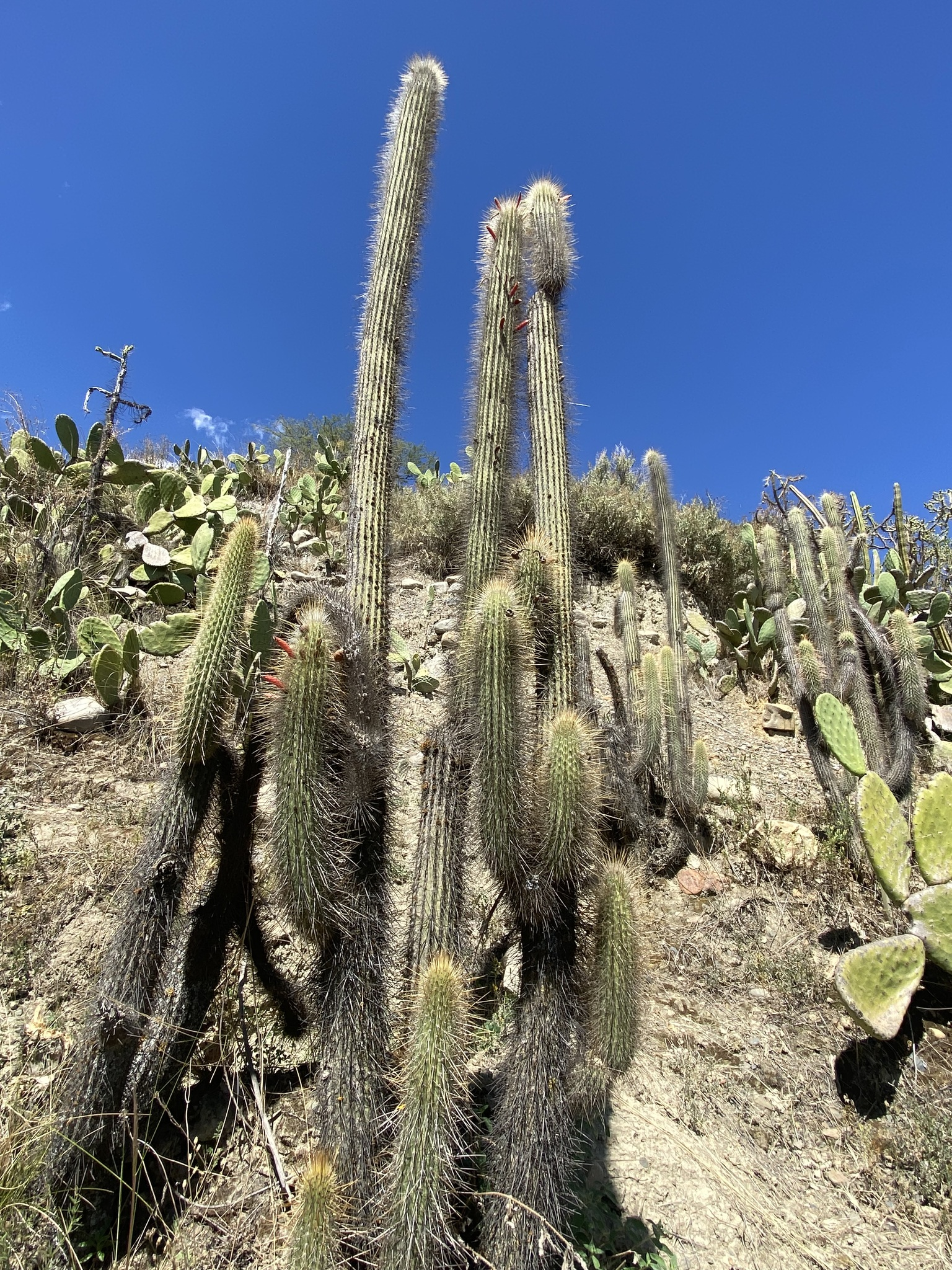
Habitat in La Paz, Bolivia

== Taxonomy ==
The first description was made in 1956 by Martín Cárdenas. The specific epithet luribayensis refers to the occurrence of the species in the Luribay a small town in the Bolivian province of Loayza where the species was found.
