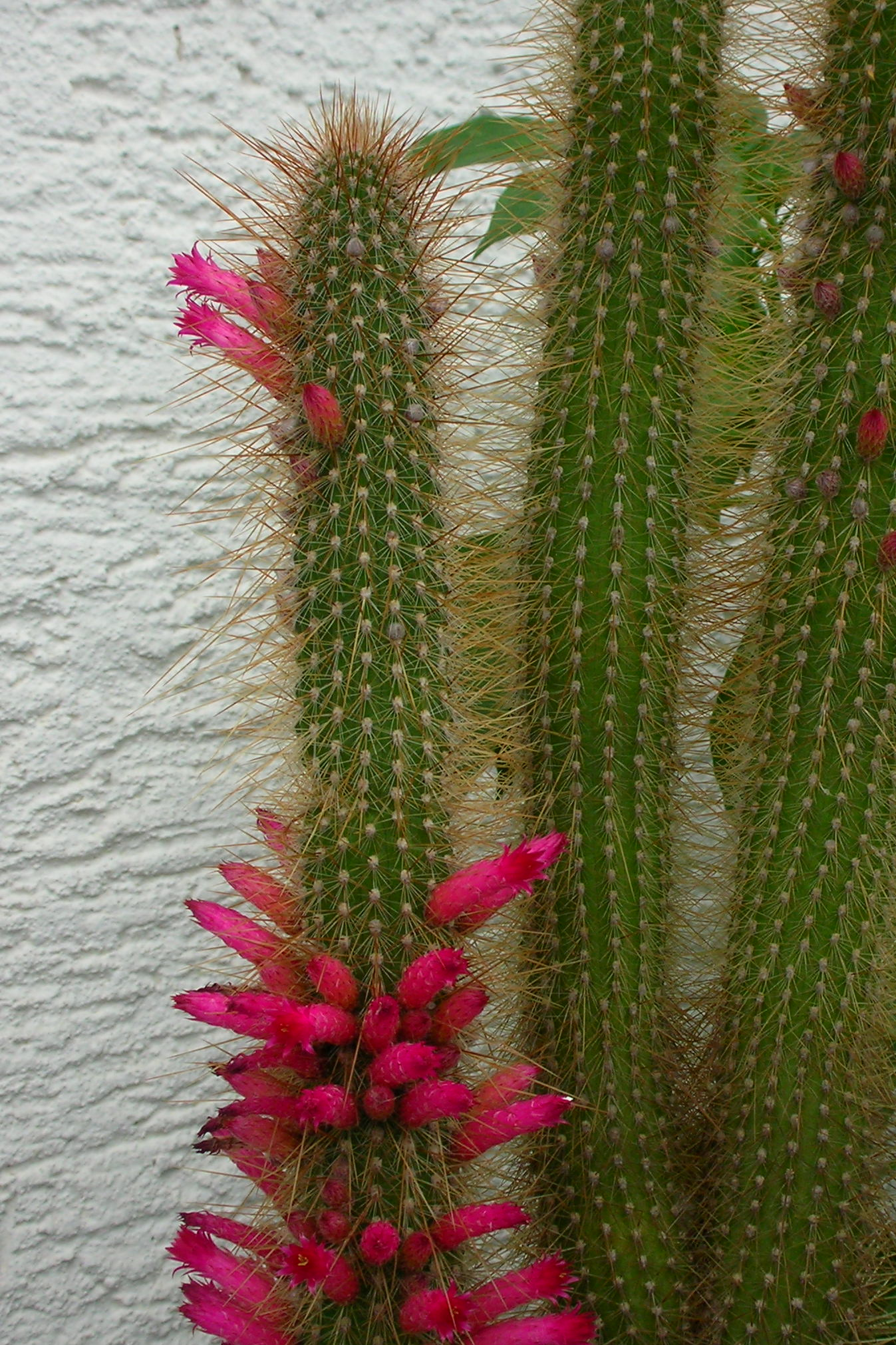

Scientific classification
- Kingdom: Plantae
- Clade: Tracheophytes
- Clade: Angiosperms
- Clade: Eudicots
- Order: Caryophyllales
- Family: Cactaceae
- Subfamily: Cactoideae
- Genus: Cleistocactus
- Species: C. hildegardiae

Binomial name
- Cleistocactus hildegardiae F.Ritter

Synonyms
- Borzicactus janae Halda & Horáček 2003

= Cleistocactus hildegardiae =

Species of cactus

Cleistocactus hildegardiae is a species of columnar cacti in the genus Cleistocactus.

== Description ==
Cleistocactus hildegardiae grows as a small shrub with often richly branched, spreading shoots that reach heights of 20 to 50 cm (7.9 to 19.7 in) with diameters of 2.5 to 3.5 cm (0.98 to 1.38 in). There are 15 to 19 low, wavy ribs. The areoles on it are close together. The thorns are needle-like and straight. The 5 to 8 central spines are golden yellow to reddish brown and 1 to 3 cm (0.39 to 1.18 in) long, thicker than radial spines. The 18 to 28 light yellow marginal spines are 3 to 8 mm (0.12 to 0.31 in) long.

The ruby red to purple flowers are 2.5 to 3.5 cm (0.98 to 1.38 in) long and 5–6 mm (0.24 in) wide. The spherical, dark green fruits later turn orange and reach a diameter of up to 1 cm (0.39 in).

== Distribution ==
Cleistocactus hildegardiae is found in the dry valleys of Bolivia in the Río Paicho valley, Tarija Department in the Eustaquio Méndez Province and Río Pilaya in Chuquisaca at elevations of 2600 to 3300 meters.

== Taxonomy ==
The first description was made in 1980 by Friedrich Ritter. The specific epithet hildegardiae honors the nursery owner Frau Hildegard Winter (1893–1975), Friedrich Ritter's sister.
