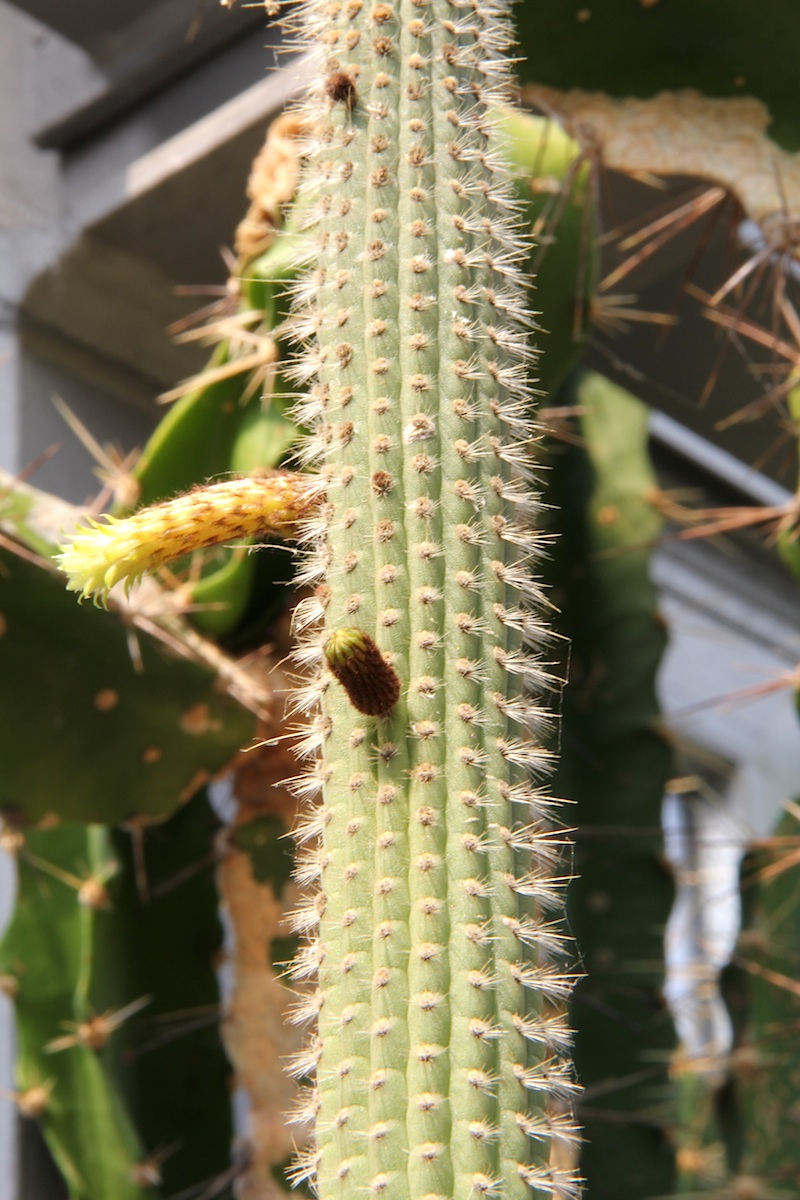

Scientific classification
- Kingdom: Plantae
- Clade: Embryophytes
- Clade: Tracheophytes
- Clade: Spermatophytes
- Clade: Angiosperms
- Clade: Eudicots
- Order: Caryophyllales
- Family: Cactaceae
- Subfamily: Cactoideae
- Genus: Cleistocactus
- Species: C. viridiflorus

Binomial name
- Cleistocactus viridiflorus Backeb., 1963

Synonyms
- Cephalocleistocactus pallidus Backeb. 1966; Cleistocactus palhuayensis F.Ritter & Shahori 1980; Cleistocactus palhuayensis var. camachoensis F.Ritter & Shahori 1980

= Cleistocactus viridiflorus =

Species of cactus

Cleistocactus viridiflorus is a species of columnar cacti in the genus Cleistocactus.

== Description ==
Cleistocactus viridiflorus grows to a height of 2 to 3 m (6 ft 7 in to 9 ft 10 in), with a diameter of 1.5 to 4 cm (0.59 to 1.57 in), and has green stems that branch at the base. The plant features 14 to 19 slightly wavy ribs lined with densely spaced areoles. From these areoles, prominent, needle-like central spines emerge—about 10 mm long and ranging in color from whitish yellow to yellow. Around 20 radial spines, white and slightly protruding, measure between 5 and 7 mm.

Its flowers are straight and tubular, measuring 3 to 3.5 cm in length. They are colored from green to white or yellow-green and tend to barely open, as is typical for many species in the genus. The fruits are light green and 1.5 cm wide.

== Distribution ==
Cleistocactus viridiflorus is a shrub-like cactus native to Bolivia's La Paz department, typically found growing along with trees and shrubs at elevations between 1,400 and 3,200 meters.

== Taxonomy ==
Cleistocactus viridiflorus was first described by the German botanist Curt Backeberg in 1963, published in "Descriptiones Cactacearum Novarum 3: 5."
