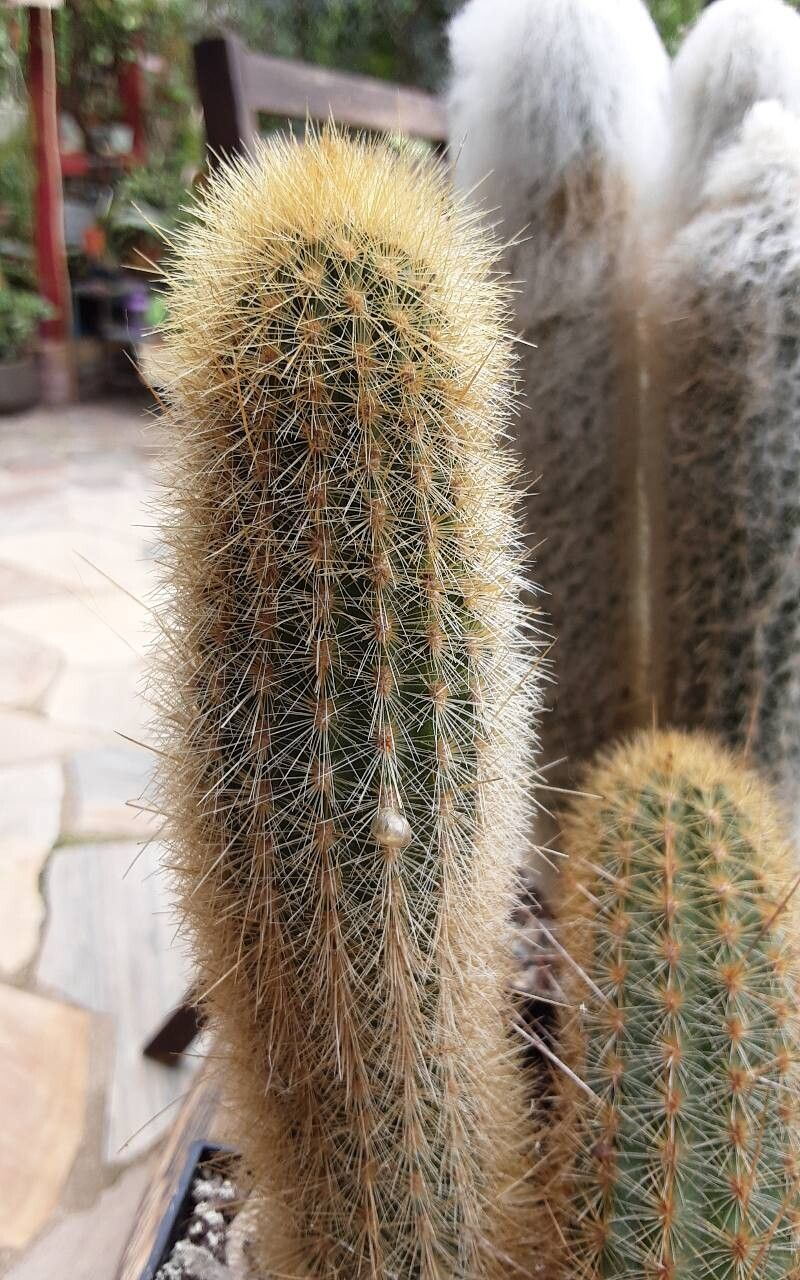

Scientific classification
- Kingdom: Plantae
- Clade: Tracheophytes
- Clade: Angiosperms
- Clade: Eudicots
- Order: Caryophyllales
- Family: Cactaceae
- Subfamily: Cactoideae
- Genus: Cleistocactus
- Species: C. variispinus

Binomial name
- Cleistocactus variispinus F.Ritter 1964

Synonyms
- Cephalocleistocactus schattatianus Backeb. 1963

= Cleistocactus variispinus =

Species of cactus

Cleistocactus variispinus is a species of columnar cacti in the genus Cleistocactus.

== Description ==
Cleistocactus variispinus grows as a shrubby plant with multiple upright stems that branch from the base to the middle. The stems reach heights of 0.5 to 1 meters and have diameters of 3 to 5 cm (1.2 to 2.0 in). They feature 14 to 18 ribs that are not clearly defined. The white areoles are spaced 3–4 mm (0.16 in) apart along these ribs. The plant has 30 to 40 straight, needle-like spines that are pale yellow, golden yellow, or brownish-yellow, and measure 1 to 4 cm (0.39 to 1.57 in) in length. One or two spines are often significantly longer. It is difficult to distinguish between central and marginal spines. Flowering areoles are often covered with unusual, bristle-like spines.

The flowers are red–orange, straight and tend to spread more or less horizontally, measuring 3.5 to 4.8 cm (1.4 to 1.9 in) long and 6–8 mm (0.31 in) wide. The flower tube is carmine to orange-red and is covered with numerous white flecks. The upright tepals are whitish with pale green tips. The spherical fruits are violet-red and can reach diameters of 1.5 to 2 cm (0.59 to 0.79 in).

== Distribution ==
This species is native to the Bolivian department of La Paz, between 3000 and 3600 meters above sea level.

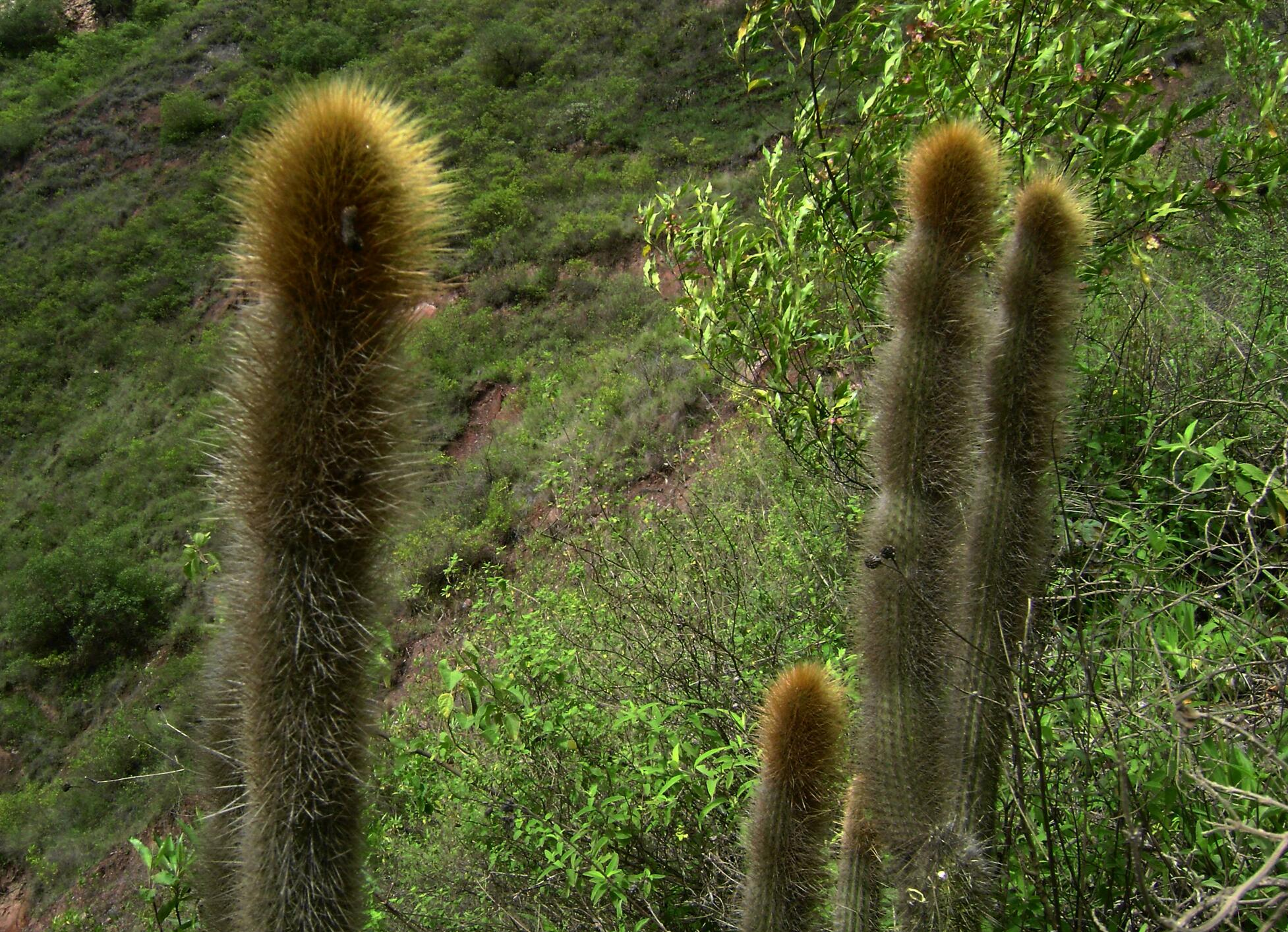
Habitat in Sorata, Bolivia

== Taxonomy ==
Cleistocactus variispinus was first described in 1964 by Friedrich Ritter. The name "variispinus" comes from the Latin words "varius," meaning "various," and "spinus," meaning "spine-covered," referring to the plant's diverse spines.
