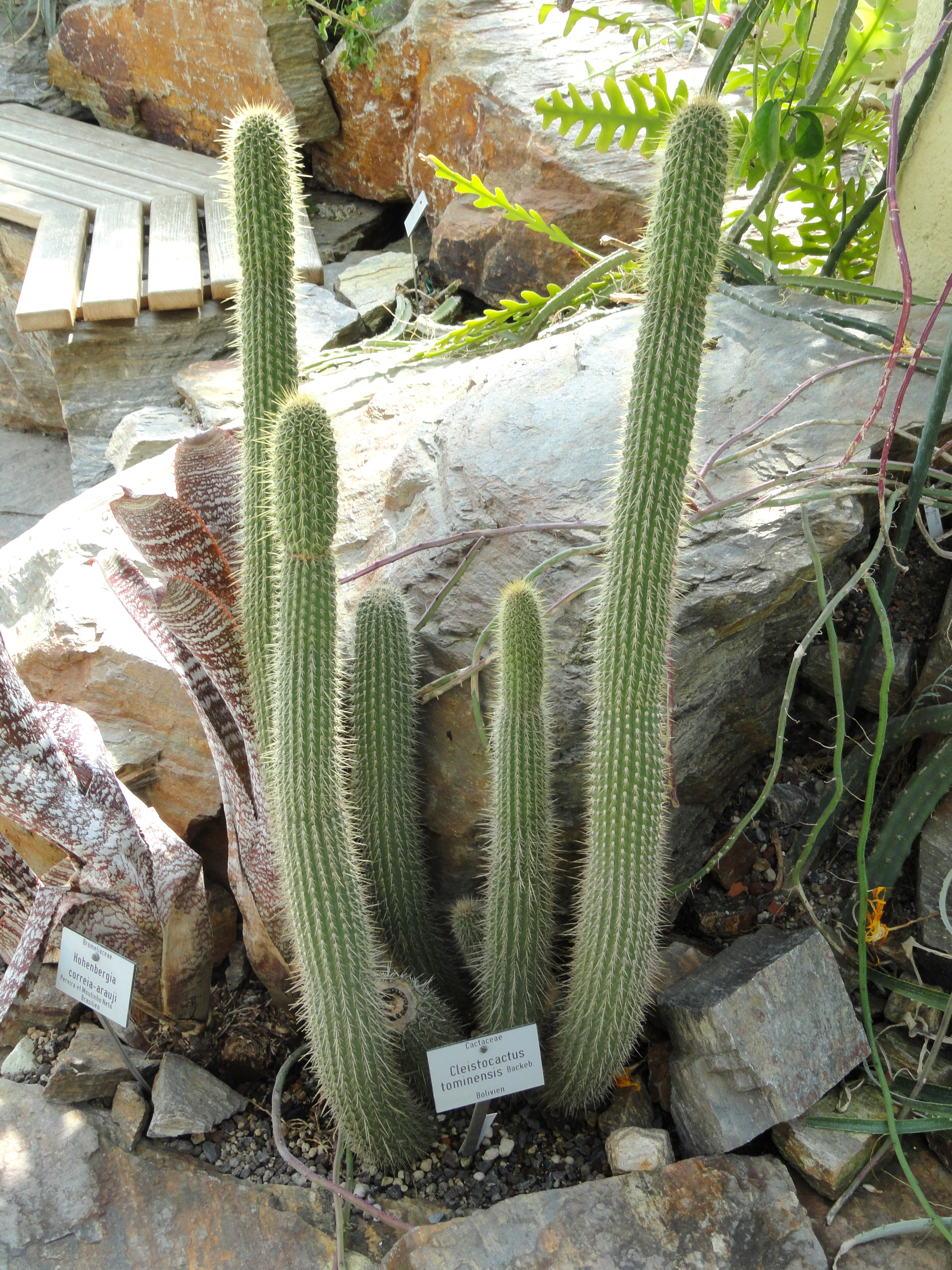

Conservation status
- Least Concern (IUCN 3.1)

Scientific classification
- Kingdom: Plantae
- Clade: Tracheophytes
- Clade: Angiosperms
- Clade: Eudicots
- Order: Caryophyllales
- Family: Cactaceae
- Subfamily: Cactoideae
- Genus: Cleistocactus
- Species: C. tominensis

Binomial name
- Cleistocactus tominensis (Weing.) Backeb.

Synonyms
- Borzicactus tominensis (Weing.) Borg 1937; Cereus tominensis Weing. 1931; Echinopsis tominensis (Weing.) Anceschi & Magli 2013; Cleistocactus mendozae Cárdenas 1963

= Cleistocactus tominensis =

Species of cactus

Cleistocactus tominensis is a species of columnar cactus in the genus Cleistocactus, endemic to Bolivia, where it is found in forests, on cliffs, and in inter-Andean valleys at altitudes of 900 to 2,200 meters.

== Description ==
Cleistocactus tominensis grows as a shrub with initially unbranched, later branched at the base, parallel, upright shoots and reaches heights of 1 to 2 meters with a diameter of up to 5 centimeters. There are 13 to 22 low, transversely furrowed ribs with brown areoles 1 cm apart. The 1 to 3 thin, central spines are yellowish to reddish, turn gray with age and are 10–15mm long and 0-20 radial spines. They are difficult to distinguish in central and radial spines. The narrow tubular flowers are green to yellow to pink or occasionally green at the base and red towards the tips. They are 2.5-3 centimeters long and 7–9mm wide. The bracts are fairly spread out. The spherical, light pink–brown fruits reach a diameter of up to 1.5-1.8 centimeters.

== Distribution ==
Cleistocactus tominensis is distributed in seasonal dry forest and scrublands in the Bolivian departments of La Paz, Chuquisaca and Tarija in the foothills of the Andes at altitudes of 1000 to 3100 meters.

== Taxonomy ==
The first description as Cereus tominensis was made in 1931 by Wilhelm Weingart. The specific epithet tominensis refers to the occurrence of the species near Tomina in the Bolivian department of Chuquisaca. Curt Backeberg placed the species in the genus Cleistocactus in 1936.
