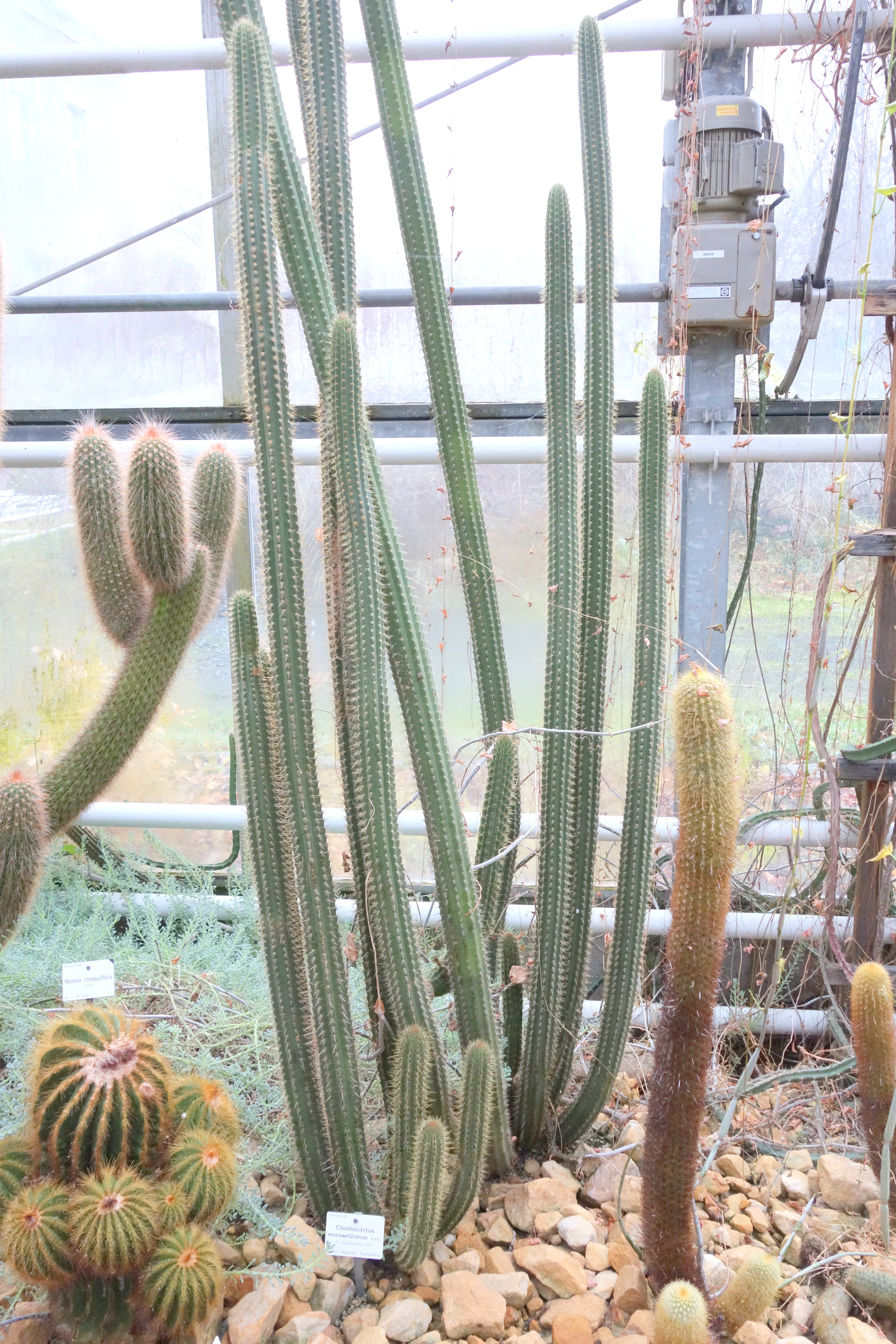

Scientific classification
- Kingdom: Plantae
- Clade: Tracheophytes
- Clade: Angiosperms
- Clade: Eudicots
- Order: Caryophyllales
- Family: Cactaceae
- Subfamily: Cactoideae
- Genus: Cleistocactus
- Species: C. morawetzianus

Binomial name
- Cleistocactus morawetzianus Backeb.

Synonyms
- Cleistocactus villaazulensis F.Ritter

= Cleistocactus morawetzianus =

Species of cactus

Cleistocactus morawetzianus is a species of columnar cactus in the genus Cleistocactus, endemic to Peru.

== Description ==
Cleistocactus morawetzianus grows shrubby to almost tree-like with richly branched, grey-green shoots and reaches heights of up to 2 meters with a diameter of up to 5 centimeters. There are 12 to 16 transversely grooved ribs. The areoles located on it are up to 1 centimeter apart. The spines, thickened at the base, are initially golden yellow, later becoming greyish with a darker tip. The mostly three sub-central spines 1.5– 5 centimeters long. The up to 14 radial spines are up to 15 mm long.

The flowers are erect, straight or slightly curved above the pericarpel and directed downwards, are white or have a light greenish or somewhat pinkish hue. They are 1.5 – 5.5 centimeters long and have a diameter of 9 millimeters. The bracts are spread out. The stylus protrudes far beyond the flower. The spherical fruits are yellowish green and around 1 cm diameter. Seeds are black and 1.2 × 0.8 mm

== Distribution ==
Cleistocactus morawetzianus is found in the Río Mantaro and Río Apurimac valley of the Peruvian regions of Junín, Huancavelica, Ayacucho and Apurímac at altitudes of 2200 to 3000 meters.

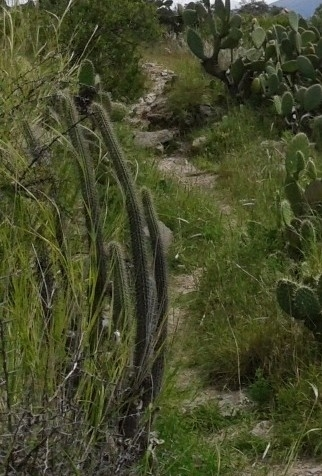
Habitat in La Vega, Peru

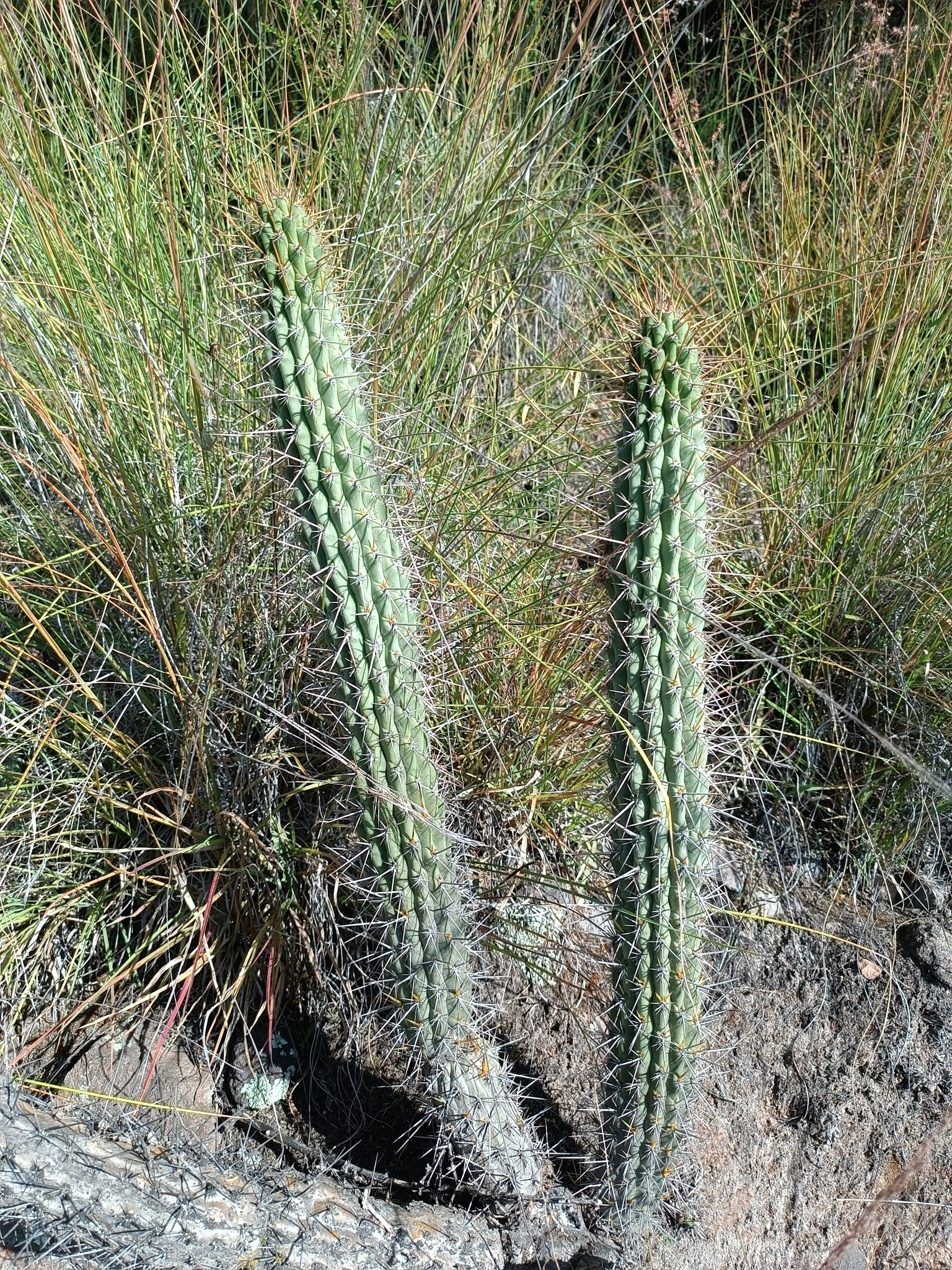
Habitat in Ayacucho, Peru

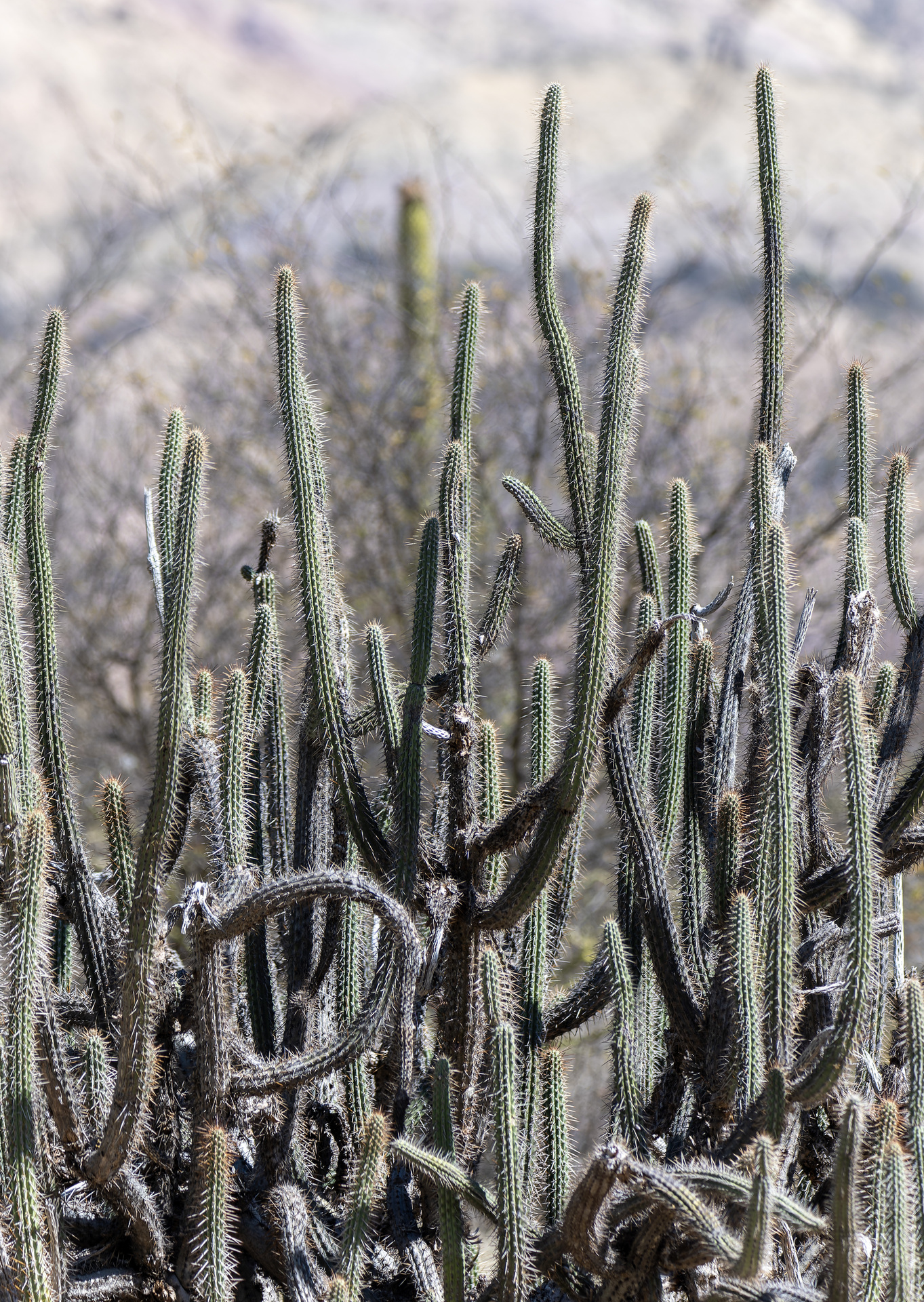
Habitat in Huarpa, Peru

== Taxonomy ==
The first description was made in 1936 by Curt Backeberg. The specific epithet morawetzianus honors Victor Morawetz from New York, an attorney and patron of Curt Backeberg's expedition. A nomenclature synonym is Echinopsis morawetziana (Backeb.) Molinari (2015).
