= Cleistocactus aurantiacus =

Scientific classification
- Kingdom: Plantae
- Clade: Embryophytes
- Clade: Tracheophytes
- Clade: Spermatophytes
- Clade: Angiosperms
- Clade: Eudicots
- Order: Caryophyllales
- Family: Cactaceae
- Subfamily: Cactoideae
- Genus: Cleistocactus
- Species: C. aurantiacus

Binomial name
- Cleistocactus aurantiacus M.Lowry 2023

Species of cactus

Cleistocactus aurantiacus is a species of Cleistocactus found in Bolivia.

== Description ==
Cleistocactus aurantiacus is a cactus species that grows as a shrub up to 2 meters tall with slender, green stems that branch from the base. It can reach several meters in height and features 10 to 15 rounded ribs along its stems, with areoles located on each rib. From these areoles, slender spines emerge; radial spines are more numerous and shorter than the central spines.

The plant produces numerous individual flowers that emerge from the areoles. These tubular flowers have barely open tips and are bright orange in color. The small, densely scaly fruits contain many seeds.

== Distribution ==
This species is native to Bolivia and typically grows in desert or dry scrub environments.

== Taxonomy ==
Cleistocactus aurantiacus was described by British botanist Martin Lowry and was first published in the scientific journal Cactus World, volume 43, page 231, in 2023. It was named after its striking orange flowers.
