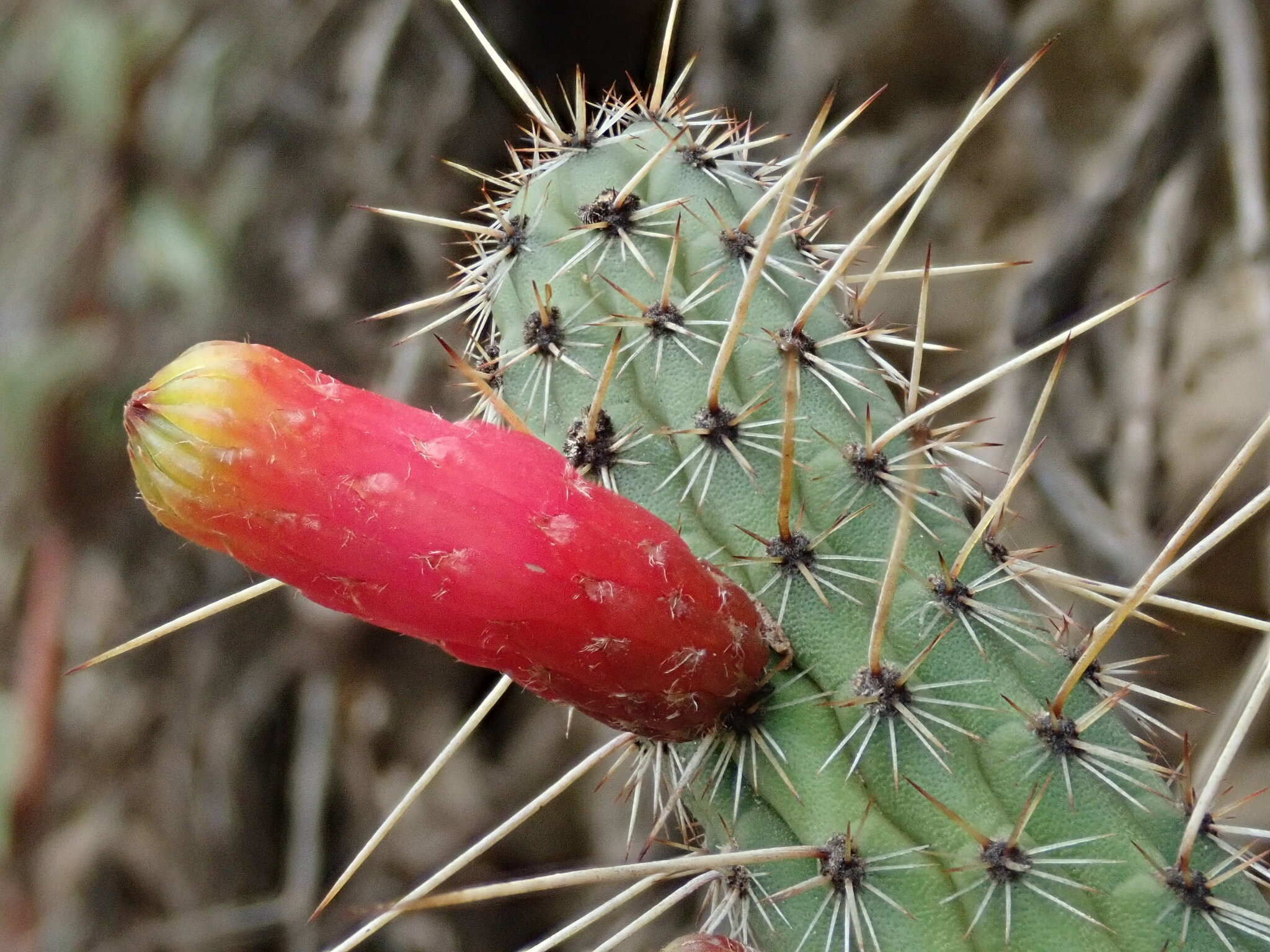

Scientific classification
- Kingdom: Plantae
- Clade: Tracheophytes
- Clade: Angiosperms
- Clade: Eudicots
- Order: Caryophyllales
- Family: Cactaceae
- Subfamily: Cactoideae
- Genus: Cleistocactus
- Species: C. dependens

Binomial name
- Cleistocactus dependens Cárdenas 1952

Synonyms
- Seticleistocactus dependens (Cárdenas) Backeb. 1966

= Cleistocactus dependens =

Species of cactus

Cleistocactus dependens is a species of Cleistocactus found in Bolivia.

== Description ==
Cleistocactus dependens grows in a shrubby form with many spreading, sprawling or drooping stems that are dull green and segmented. The stems are 3 to 4 cm (1.2 to 1.6 in) in diameter, slightly tapering toward the tips. Each stem has 10 to 12 rounded ribs that are distinctly furrowed across their width. Areoles are spaced about 1.1 to 1.5 cm (0.43 to 0.59 in) apart on these ribs. The plant has 3 to 4 spreading central spines; one of these points downward. These spines are gray with black tips and measure 1 to 1.5 cm (0.39 to 0.59 in) in length. Additionally, there are 8 to 13 fine, needle-like radial spines that are reddish-gray and 2 to 4 mm (0.079 to 0.157 in) long.

The flowers are straight, radially symmetrical, and measure 4 to 4.5 cm (1.6 to 1.8 in) long, with a diameter of up to 7 mm (0.28 in). The flower tube is strawberry-red and covered with scales that contain a few white hairs. The tepals are greenish to whitish-green and barely spread apart. The spherical fruits are reddish-magenta, reaching diameters of up to 1.4 cm (0.55 in). Seeds are 1 mm (0.039 in) long and black

== Distribution ==
Cleistocactus dependens is native to the Santa Cruz Department of Florida, Bolivia. It grows on moist, rocky slopes and cliffs near gorges at elevations between 800 and 1,500 meters.

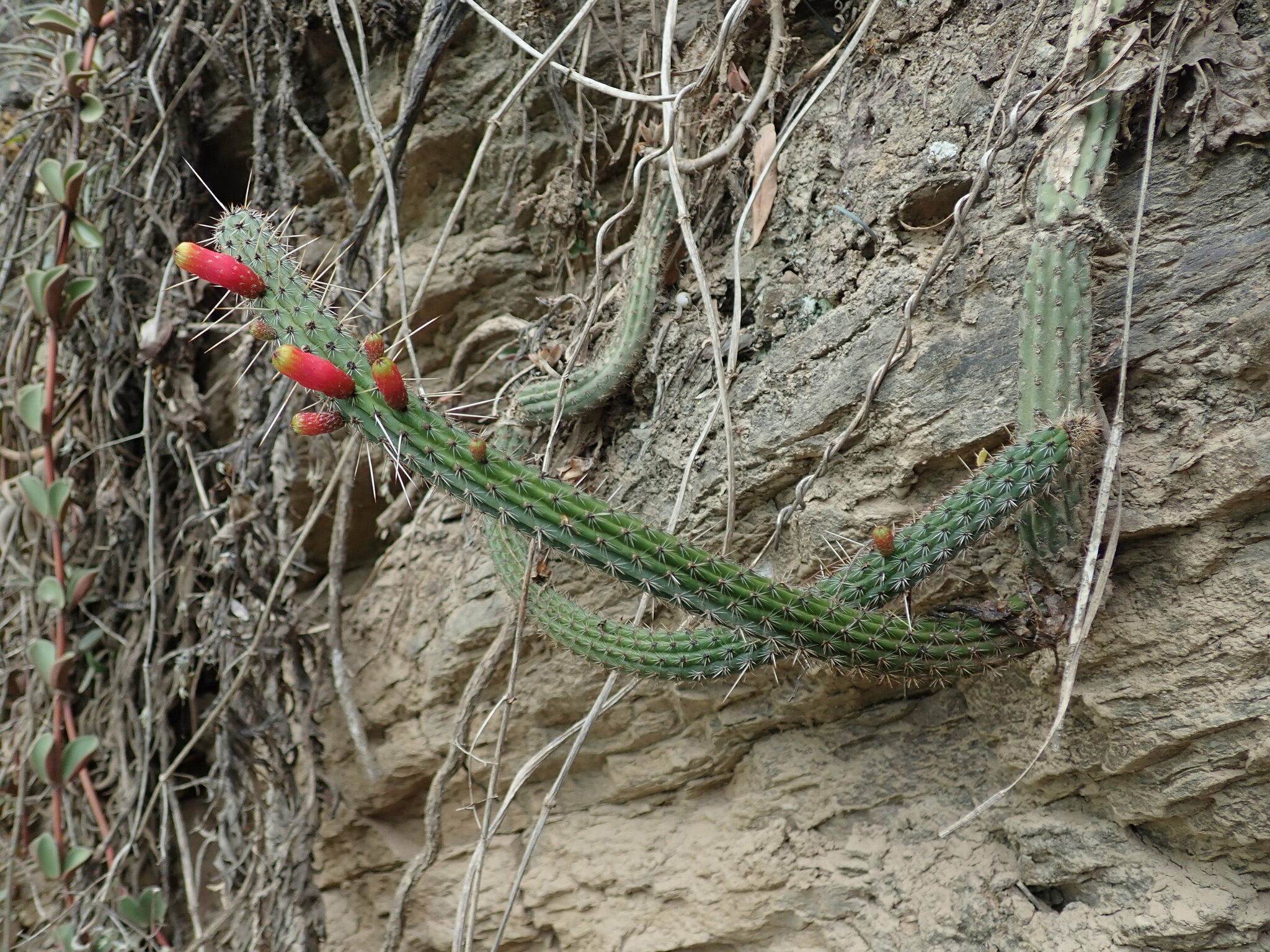
Habitat in Bolivia

== Taxonomy ==
This species was first described in 1952 by Martín Cárdenas. The name "dependens" is Latin for "hanging", referring to its hanging growth habit.
