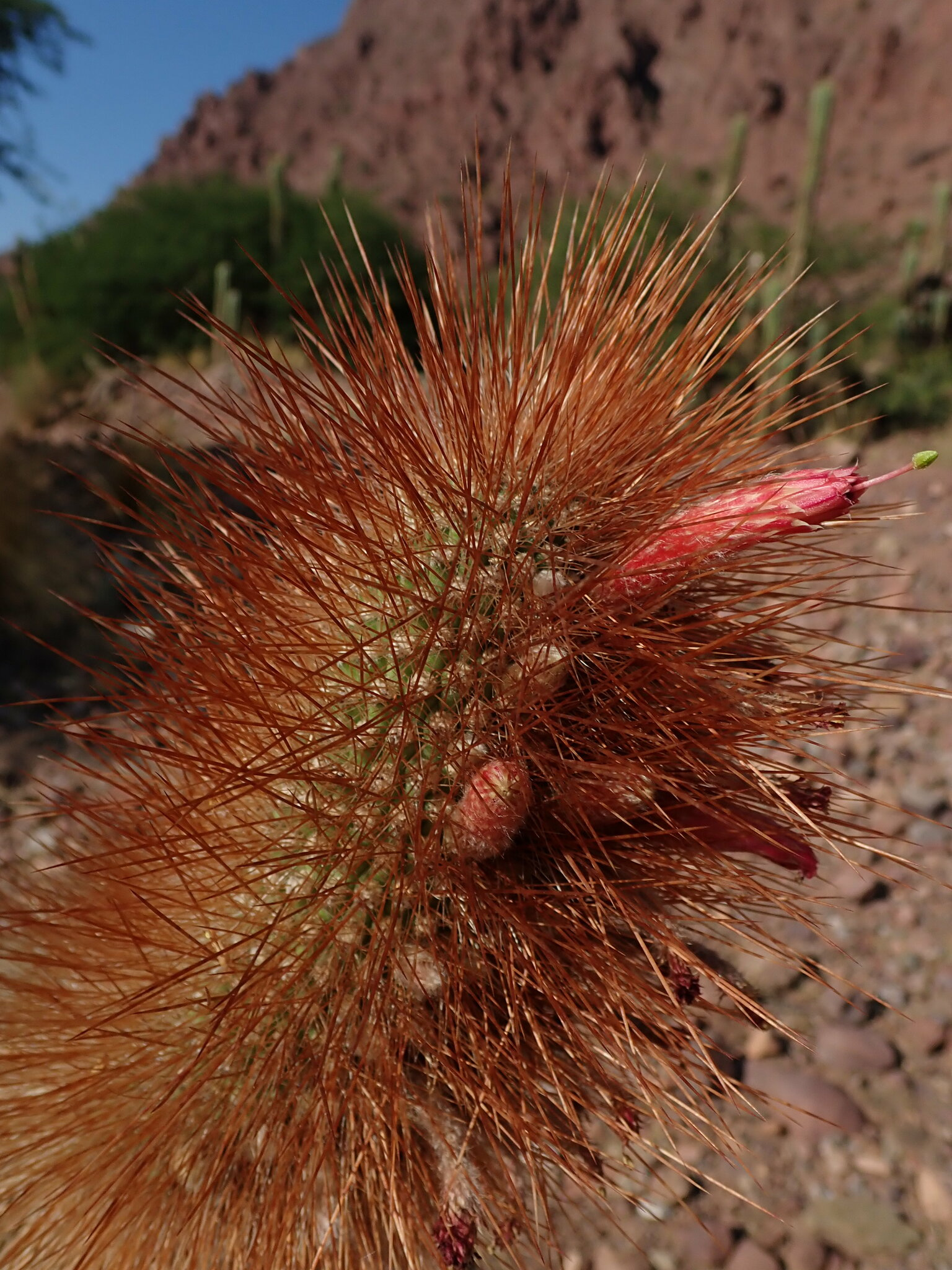

Scientific classification
- Kingdom: Plantae
- Clade: Tracheophytes
- Clade: Angiosperms
- Clade: Eudicots
- Order: Caryophyllales
- Family: Cactaceae
- Subfamily: Cactoideae
- Genus: Cleistocactus
- Species: C. orthogonus

Binomial name
- Cleistocactus orthogonus Cárdenas 1959

= Cleistocactus orthogonus =

Species of cactus

Cleistocactus orthogonus is a species of Cleistocactus found in Bolivia.

== Description ==
Cleistocactus orthogonus grows as a shrub with short, upright, light green stems that are probably unbranched. These stems can reach up to 80 centimeters in height and are about 4 to 5 centimeters in diameter. The plant has 15 to 17 straight, low ribs, with closely spaced gray areoles along them. From these ribs, about ten needle-like, whitish spines radiate outward; they are fine, straight, and measure between 0.5 and 3 centimeters in length. These spines are not distinguishable as either central or marginal spines.

The flowers are straight, tubular, and radially symmetrical, colored in shades of magenta to pink, and measure approximately 4.5 to 5 centimeters long. The spherical fruits are pinkish-red and can reach up to 1.5 centimeters in diameter.

== Distribution ==
Cleistocactus orthogonus is native to Bolivia, specifically in the Department of Potosí, in the province of Cornelio Saavedra, within the municipality of Betanzos.

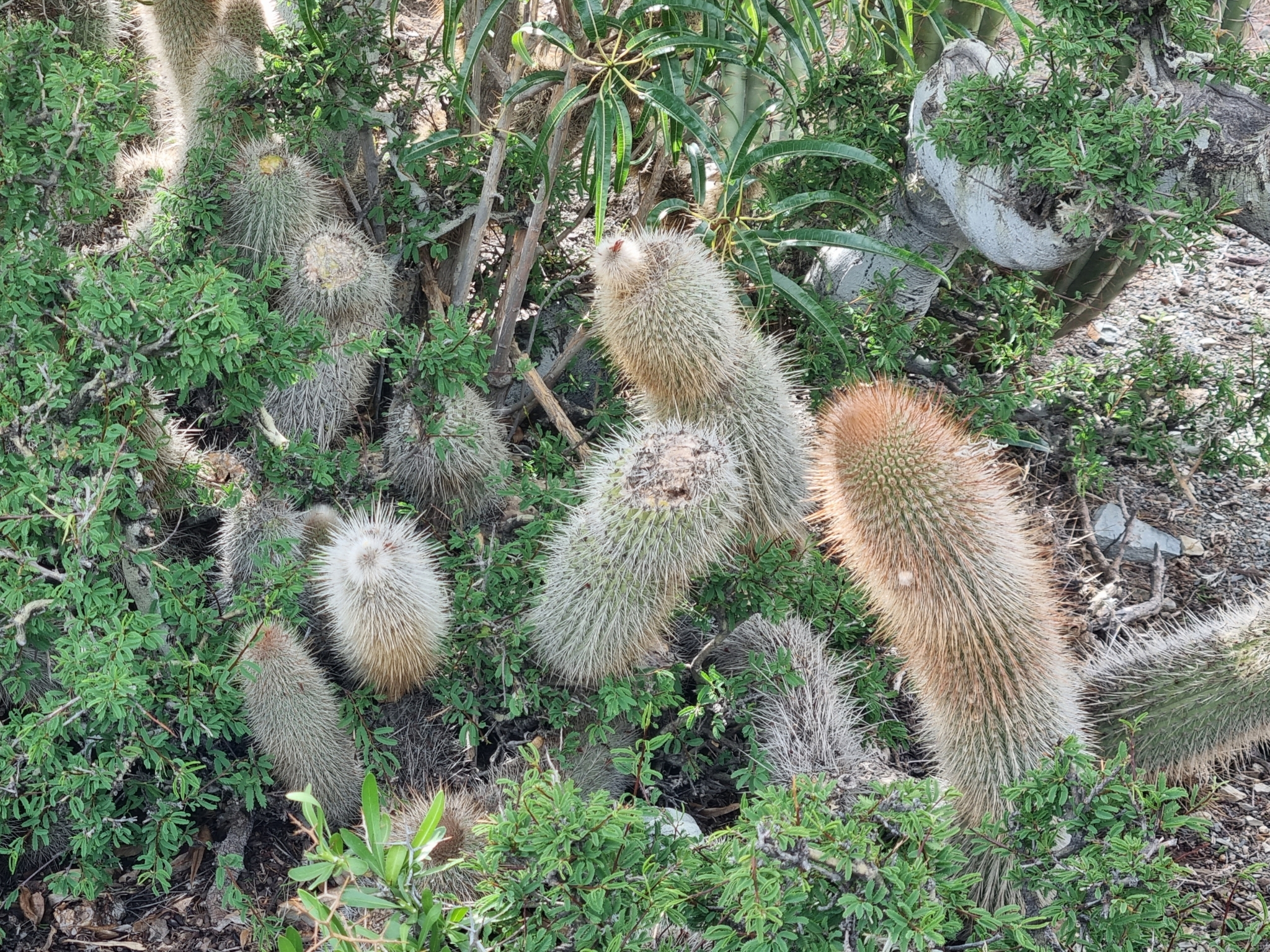
Habitat in Finca Iscayache, Bolivia

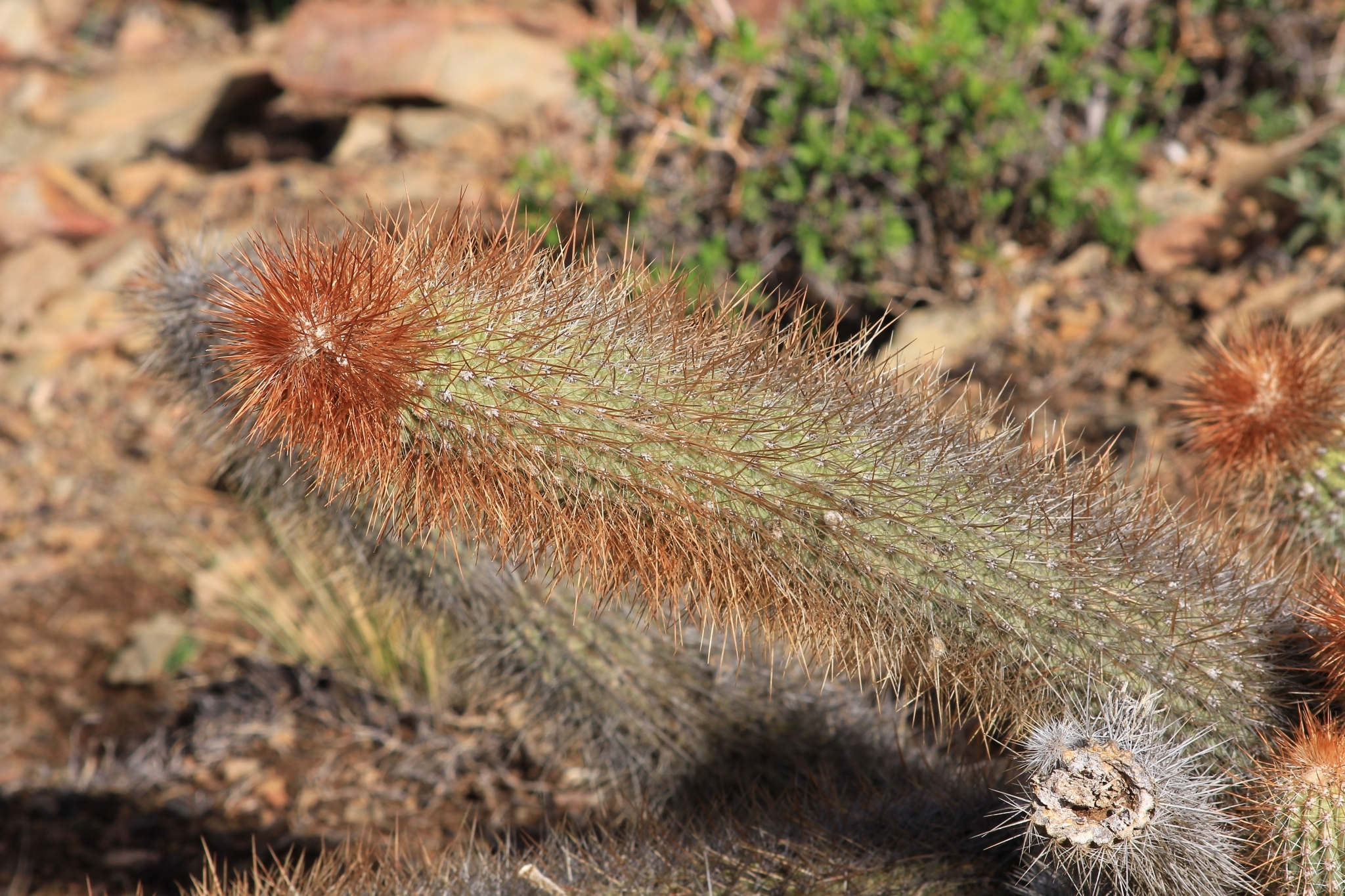
Habitat in Cieneguillas, Bolivia

== Taxonomy ==
This species was first described in 1959 by Martín Cárdenas. The name "orthogonus" comes from Greek words meaning "straight" (orthos) and "edge" (gonia), referring to the plant's straight, vertical ribs.
