= Cleistocactus capadalensis =

Conservation status
- Vulnerable (IUCN 3.1)

Scientific classification
- Kingdom: Plantae
- Clade: Tracheophytes
- Clade: Angiosperms
- Clade: Eudicots
- Order: Caryophyllales
- Family: Cactaceae
- Subfamily: Cactoideae
- Genus: Cleistocactus
- Species: C. capadalensis

Binomial name
- Cleistocactus capadalensis F.Ritter

Species of cactus

Cleistocactus capadalensis is a species of columnar cacti in the genus Cleistocactus.

== Description ==
Cleistocactus capadalensis grows as a shrub with branched at the base, usually several, fairly rigid, upright or arched shoots and reaches lengths of up to 1–1.5 meters with diameters of 3 to 5 cm (1.2 to 2.0 in). The areoles on it are 5 to 8 mm apart. The 2–3 bright yellow central spine is up to 3 cm (1.2 in) long. The 8 to 12 radial spines are yellowish brown.

The straight upward facing, yellow to orange flowers are 2 to 3.5 cm (0.79 to 1.38 in) long and reach a diameter of up to 8 mm long. The inner petals are red. The stamens and style protrude from the flower. The stamens are red. The globose, green to red fruits. They reach a diameter of 1 cm (0.39 in).

== Distribution ==
Cleistocactus capadalensis found in Chuquisaca Department, Bolivia growing in sandy soil in the dry forest at elevations between 2000 and 2500 meters.

== Taxonomy ==
The first description was made without flowers and fruits in 1980 by Friedrich Ritter from a specimen collected from the slopes of Río Pilcomayo in Chuquisaca Department, Bolivia. The plant is named after Capadala the region where the plant was found. It was considered a synonym of Cleistocactus baumannii until it was recollected in 2012 by Mats Winberg.
