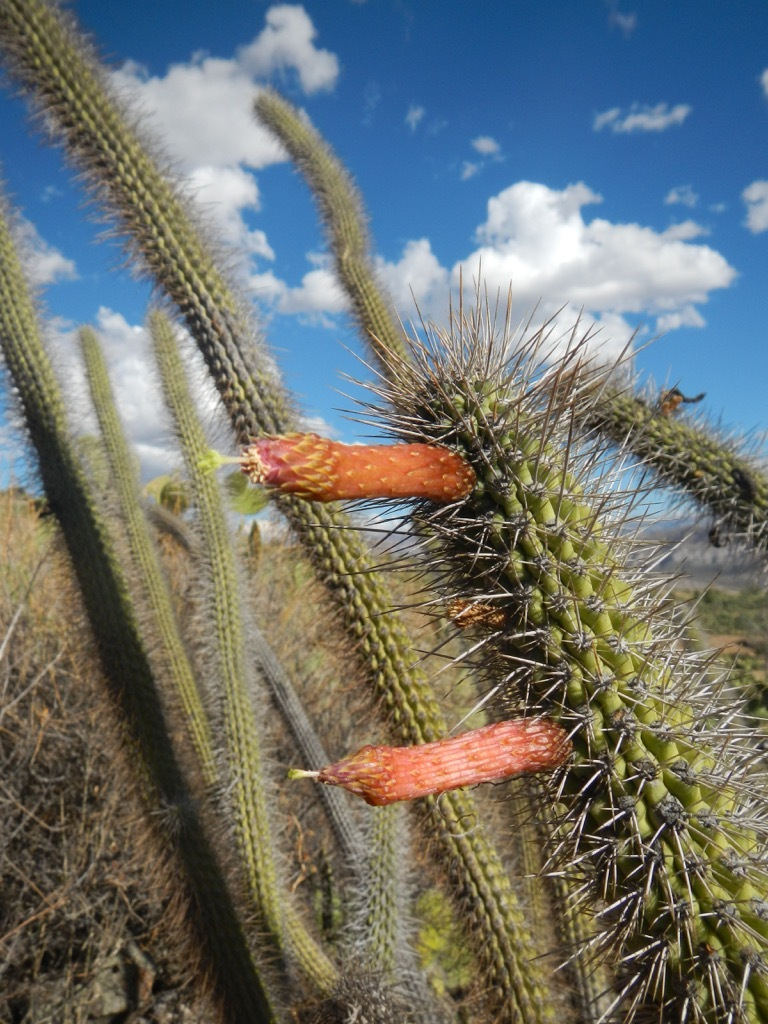

Scientific classification
- Kingdom: Plantae
- Clade: Tracheophytes
- Clade: Angiosperms
- Clade: Eudicots
- Order: Caryophyllales
- Family: Cactaceae
- Subfamily: Cactoideae
- Genus: Cleistocactus
- Species: C. pungens

Binomial name
- Cleistocactus pungens F.Ritter

Synonyms
- Cleistocactus brevispinus F.Ritter 1981; Loxanthocereus brevispinus Rauh & Backeb. 1958

= Cleistocactus pungens =

Species of cactus

Cleistocactus pungens is a species of columnar cactus in the genus Cleistocactus, endemic to Peru.

== Description ==
Cleistocactus pungens grows as a shrub with spreading shoots and reaches heights of 1 to 1.5 meters with diameters of 3 to 4 centimeters. The grey-green stems have about 12-15 wavy ribs. The areoles on it, which are initially brown and later gray, are close together at 5–7mm apart. The straight, needle-like, stiff, protruding thorns are initially dark reddish brown and later gray. The usually 2 to 5 central spines are 2 to 5 centimeters long, the 8 to 12 marginal spines are 2 to 12 millimeters long.

The horizontally protruding, red purple-colored flowers are slightly curved downwards above the pericarpel. They are 7-8 centimeters long and have a diameter of 6-8 millimeters. The spherical, pale red fruits reach a diameter of up to 2 centimeters.

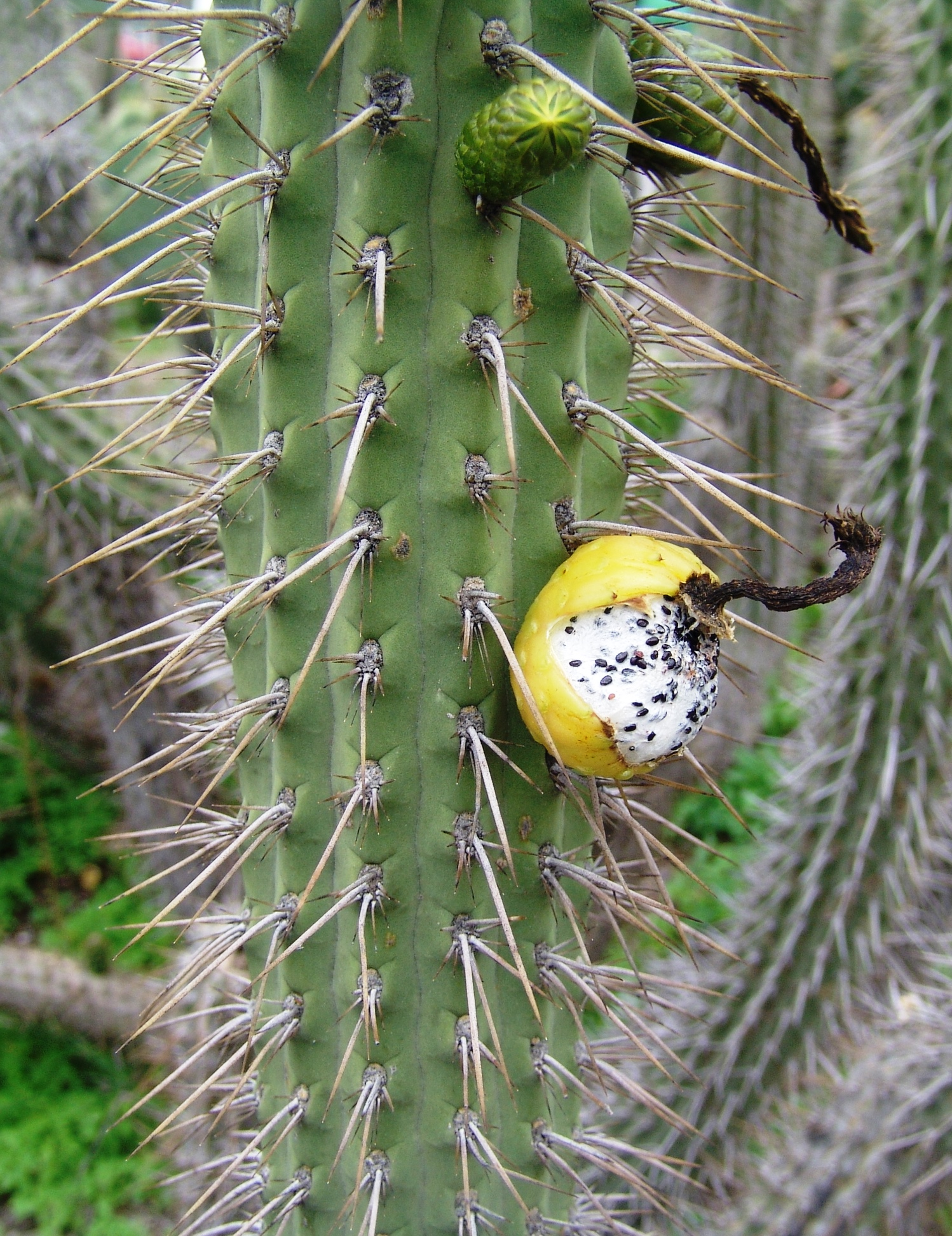
Fruit

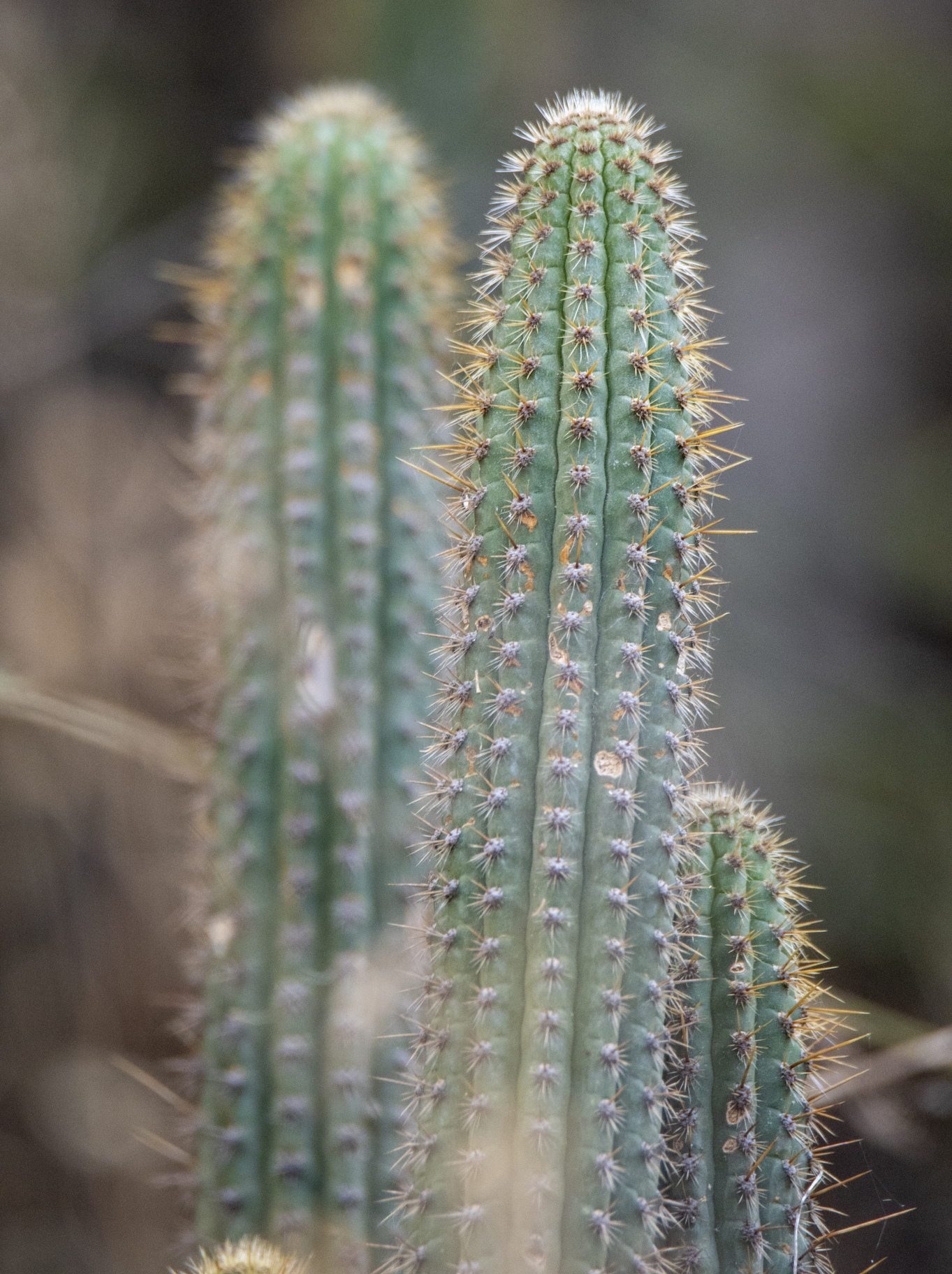
Top and spines

== Distribution ==
Cleistocactus pungens is widespread in the Peruvian regions of Ayacucho and Apurímac at altitudes of 1100 to 2400 meters.

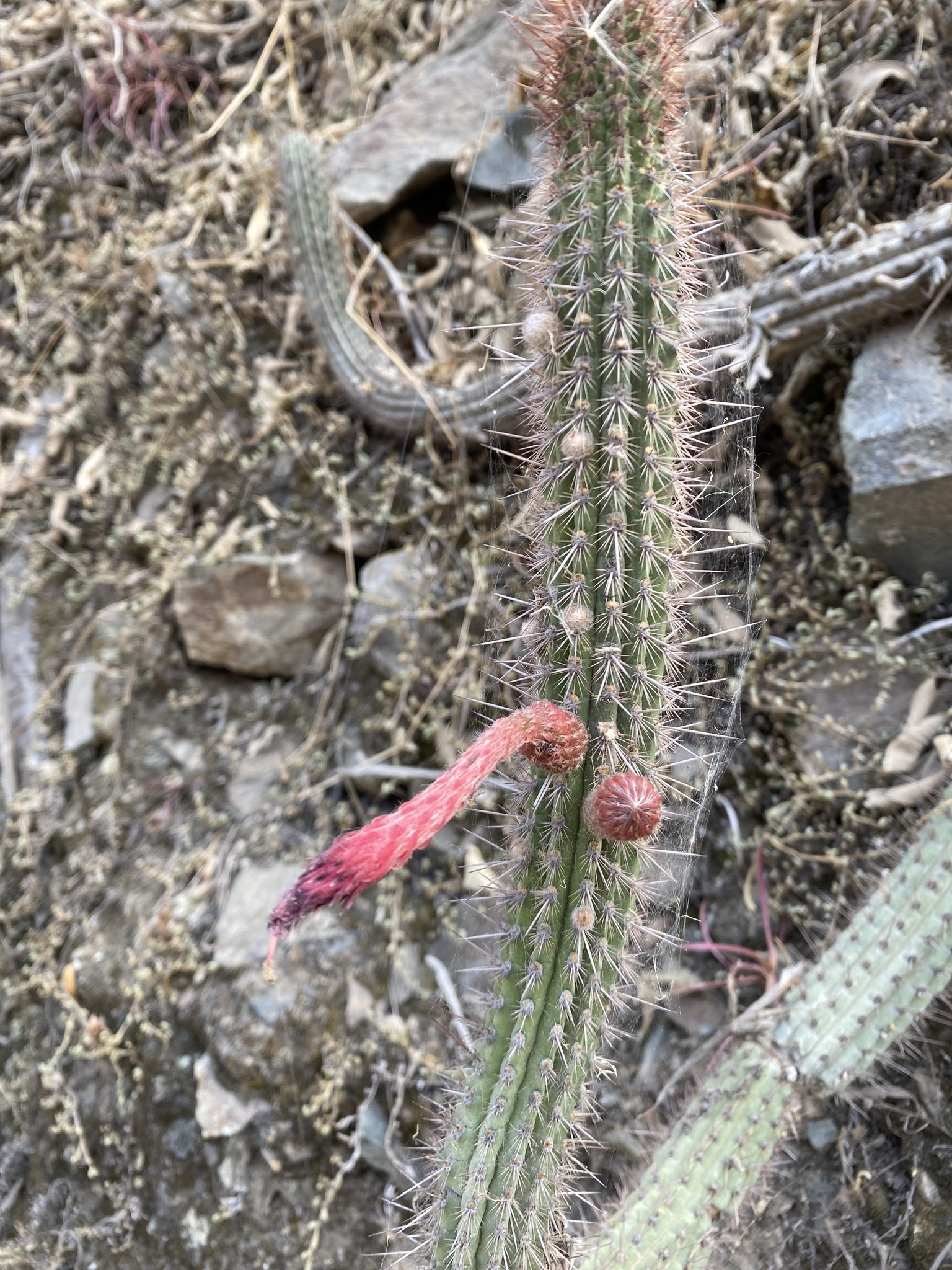
Plant blooming in habitat

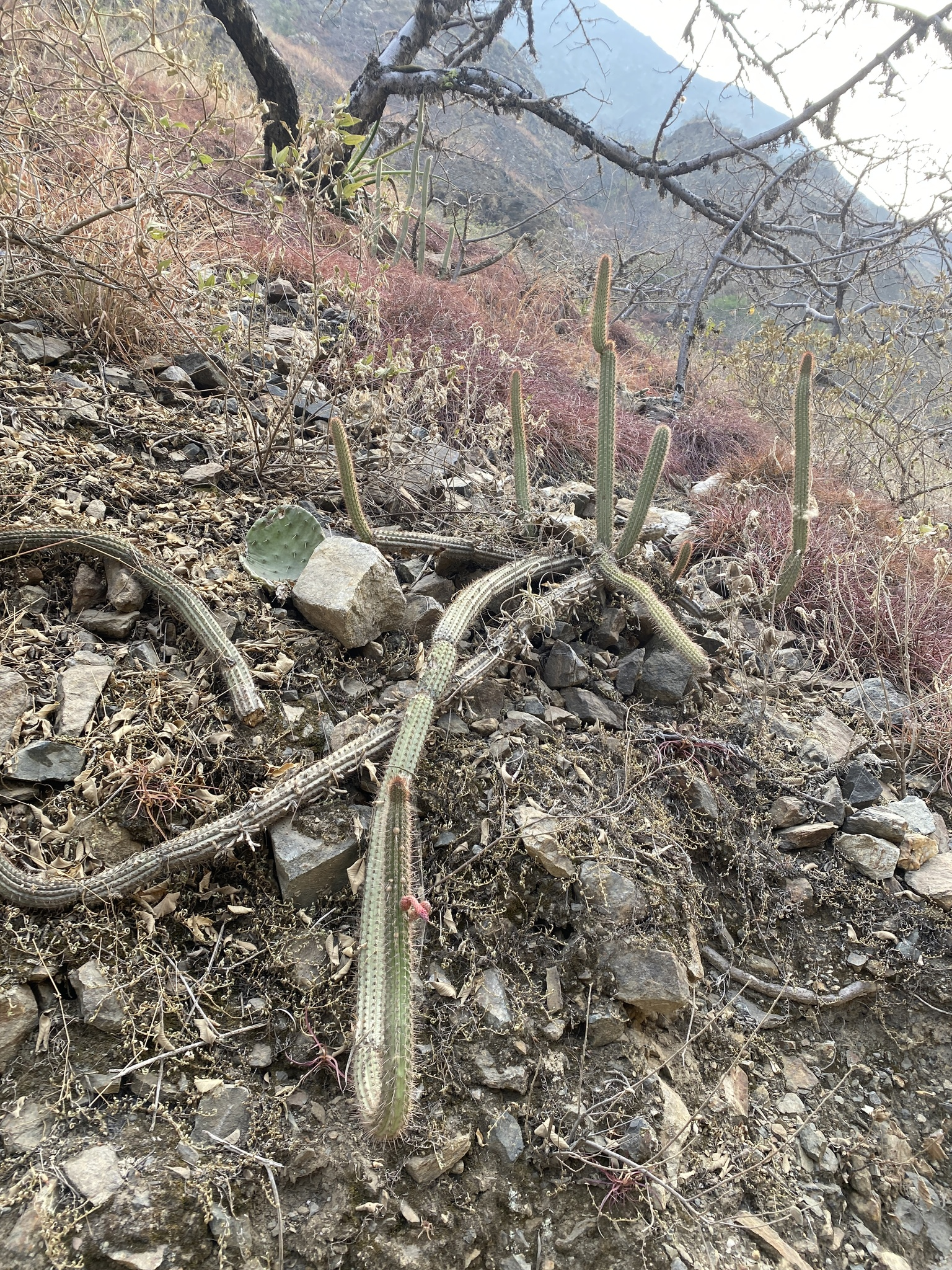
Habitat near Caserio Santa Rosa, Peru

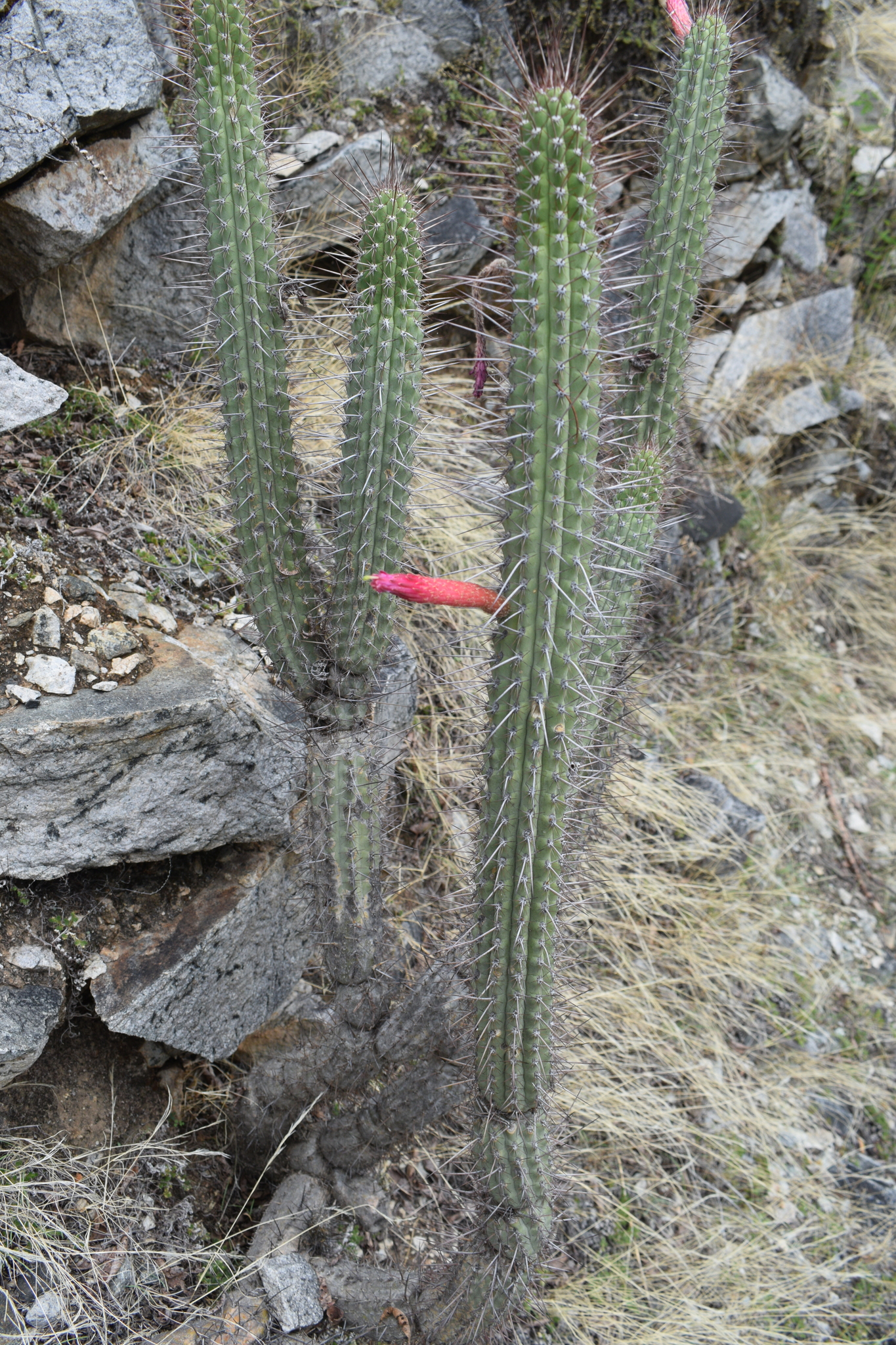
Plant growth habit in habitat

== Taxonomy ==
The first description was made in 1964 by Friedrich Ritter. The specific epithet pungens comes from Latin, means 'stinging' and refers to the thorns of the species.
