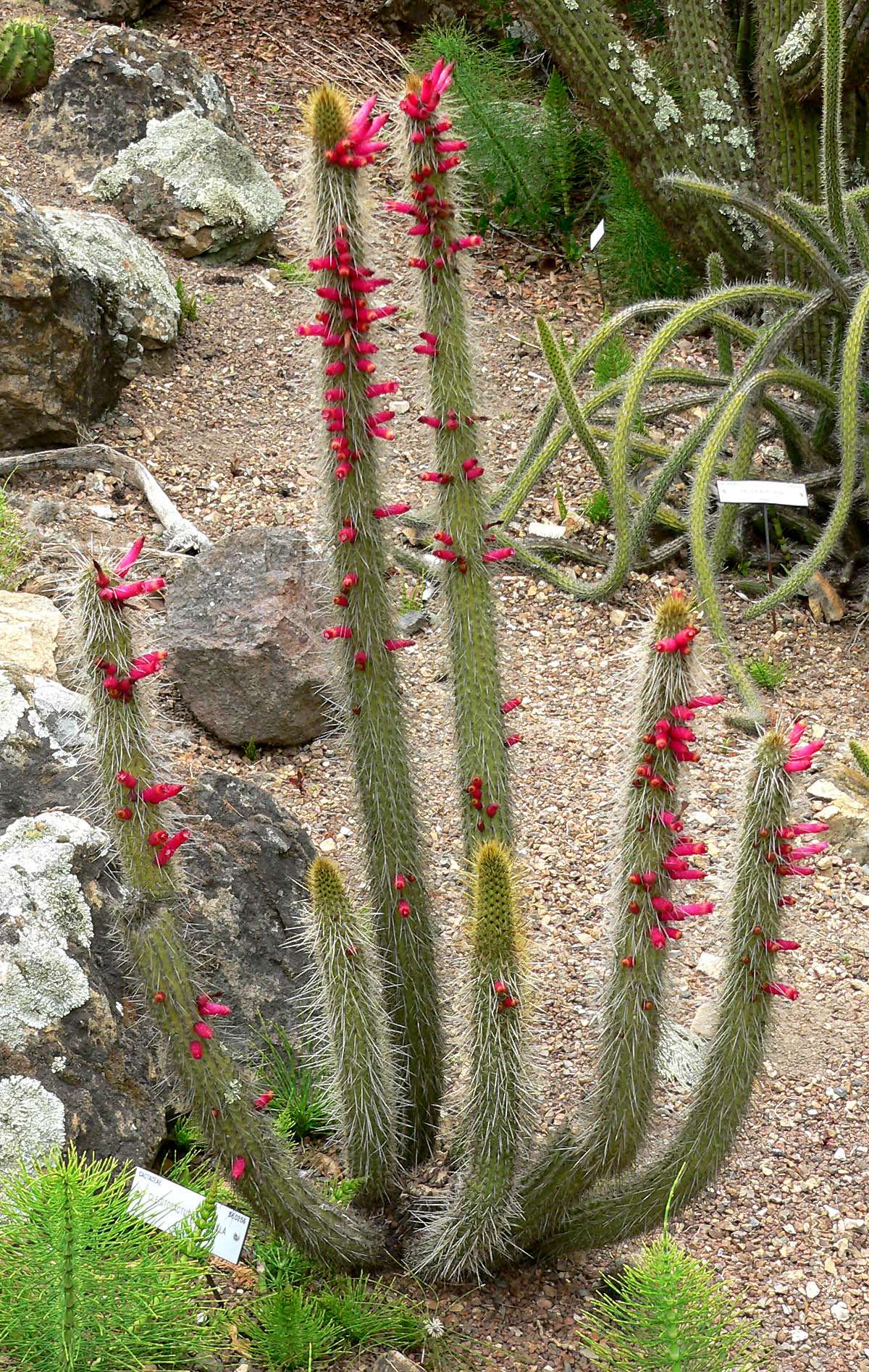

Conservation status
- Least Concern (IUCN 3.1)

Scientific classification
- Kingdom: Plantae
- Clade: Tracheophytes
- Clade: Angiosperms
- Clade: Eudicots
- Order: Caryophyllales
- Family: Cactaceae
- Subfamily: Cactoideae
- Genus: Cleistocactus
- Species: C. candelilla

Binomial name
- Cleistocactus candelilla Cárdenas 1952

Synonyms
- Echinopsis candelilla (Cárdenas) Anceschi & Magli 2013; Cleistocactus candelilla subsp. piraymirensis (Cárdenas) Mottram 2002; Cleistocactus candelilla var. pojoensis Cárdenas 1952; Cleistocactus muyurinensis F.Ritter 1964; Cleistocactus piraymirensis Cárdenas 1961; Cleistocactus pojoensis (Cárdenas) Backeb. 1959; Seticleistocactus piraymirensis (Cárdenas) Backeb. 1963

= Cleistocactus candelilla =

Species of cactus

Cleistocactus candelilla is a species of Cleistocactus found in Bolivia.

== Description ==
Cleistocactus candelilla grows as a shrub with erect to splaying shoots that are branched at the base and reaches heights of growth of up to 1 meter (rarely up to 3 meters) with a diameter of 3 to 5 centimeters. There are 11 to 13 ribs present, which are conspicuously furrowed across. The 3 to 4 (rarely 1 to 4) yellowish brown central spines are somewhat flattened and 1 to 2.5 centimeters (rarely up to 3 centimeters) long. The 13 to 15, up to 5 mm long, radial spines are light brown to gray or yellowish brown in the upper part and whitish in the lower part.

The light purple flowers are 3.5 to 4 inches long. They are straight or slightly curved, projecting more or less horizontally, and are covered with few scales and inconspicuous hairs. The light salmon-pink fruits reach a diameter of up to 10 millimeters.

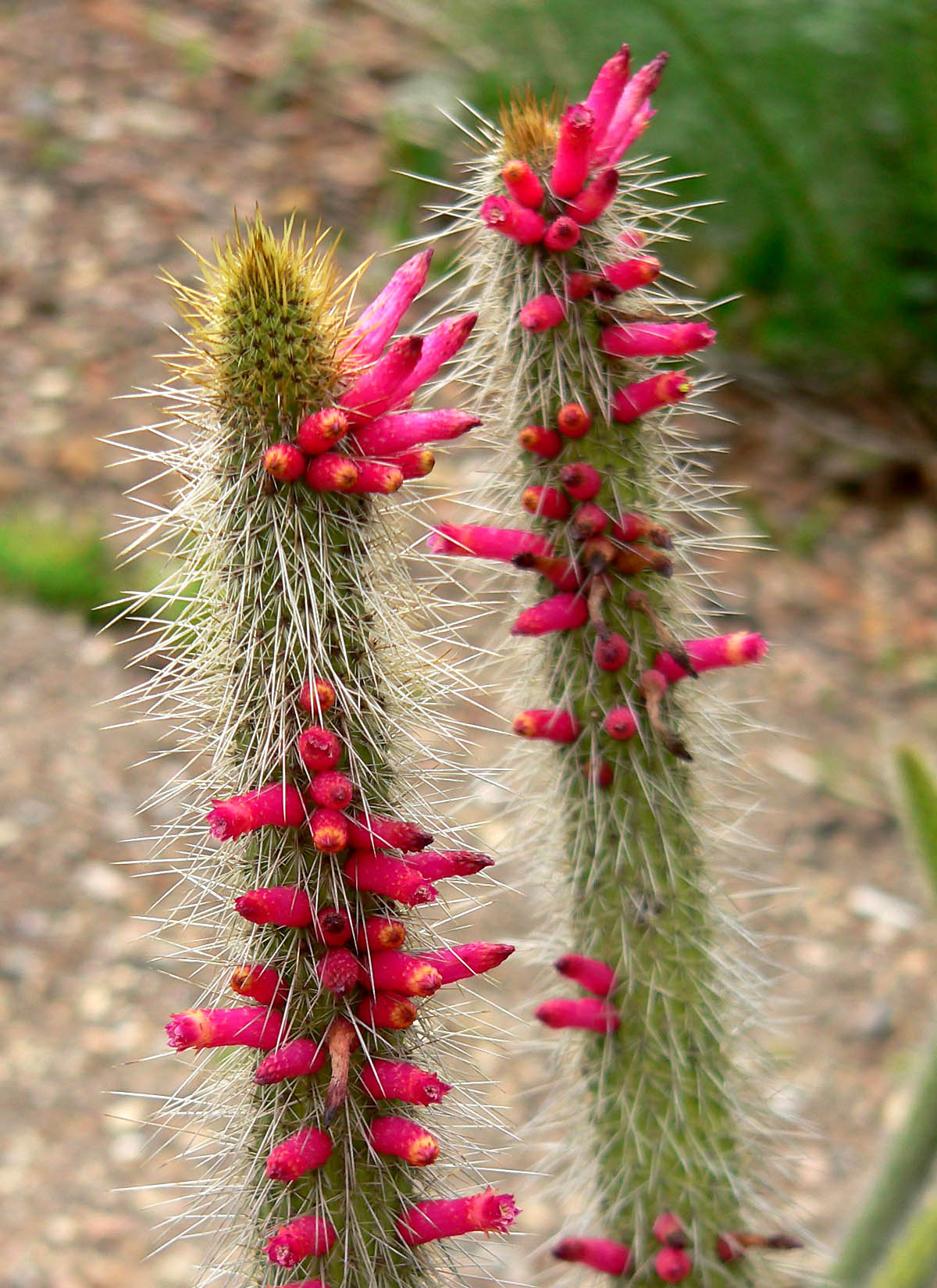
Flowers

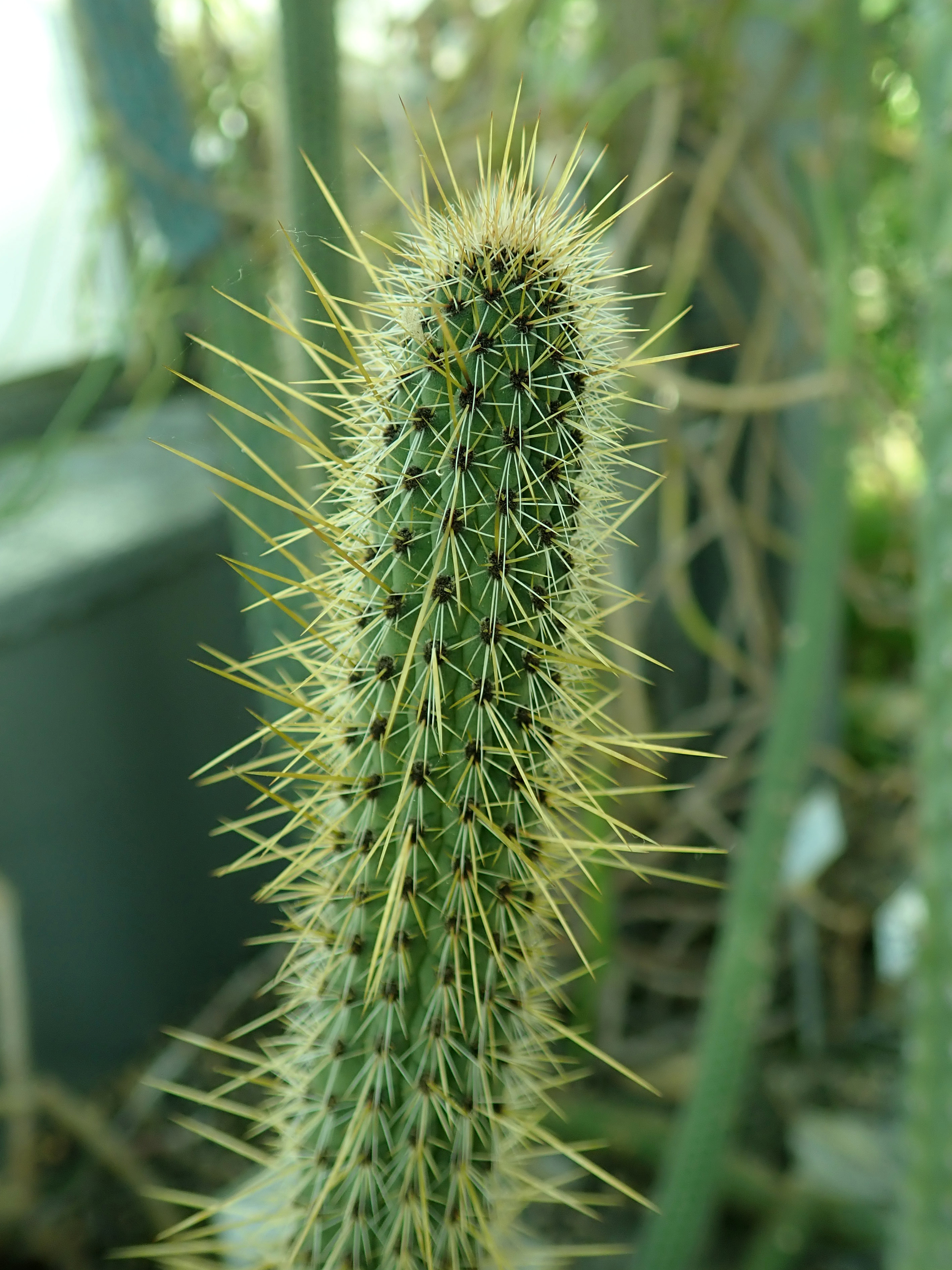
spines

== Distribution ==
Cleistocactus candelilla is found in the Bolivian departments of Cochabamba, Potosí and Santa Cruz at altitudes of 1300 to 2600 meters.

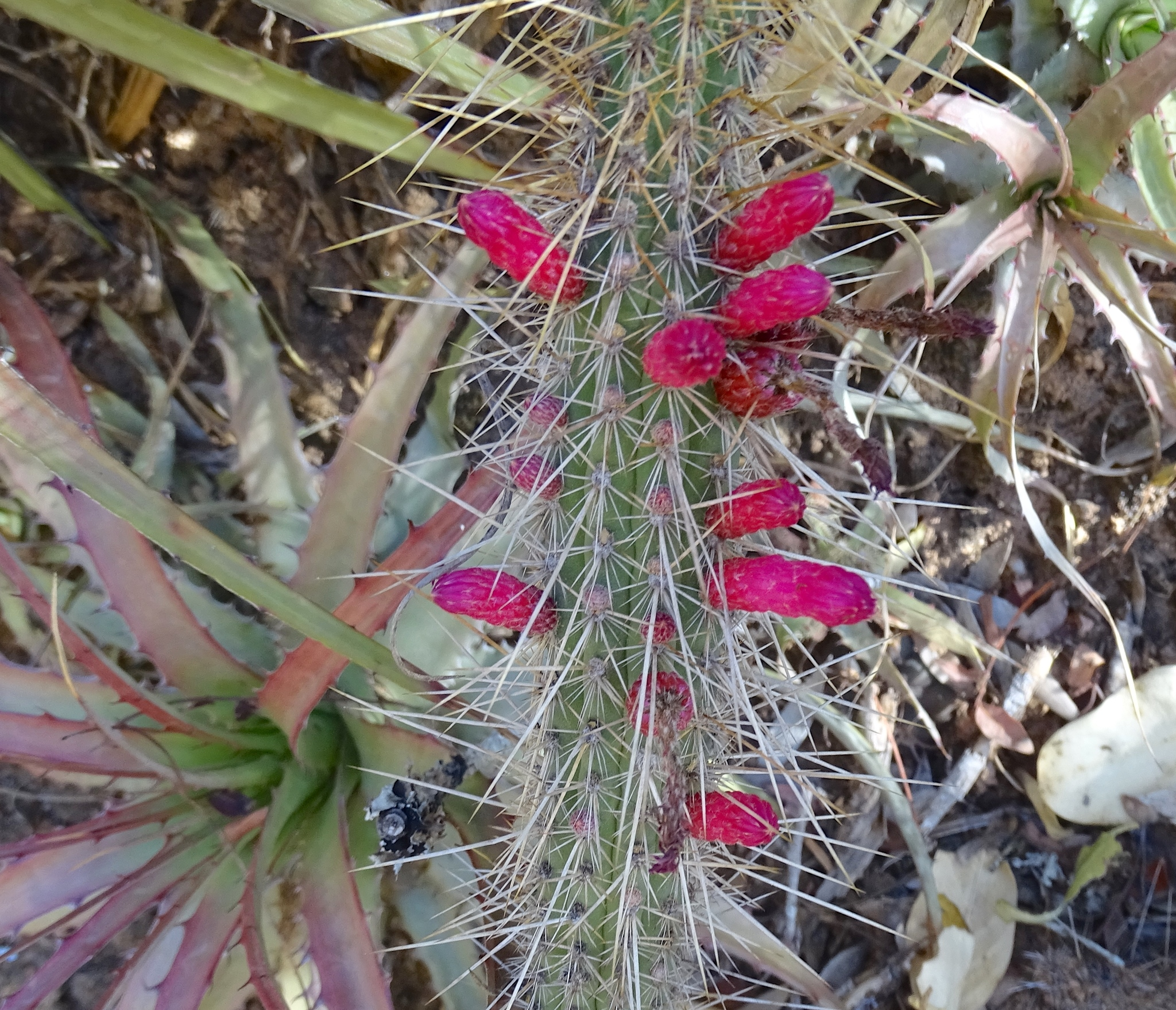
Plant blooming in habitat in Mataral, Bolivia

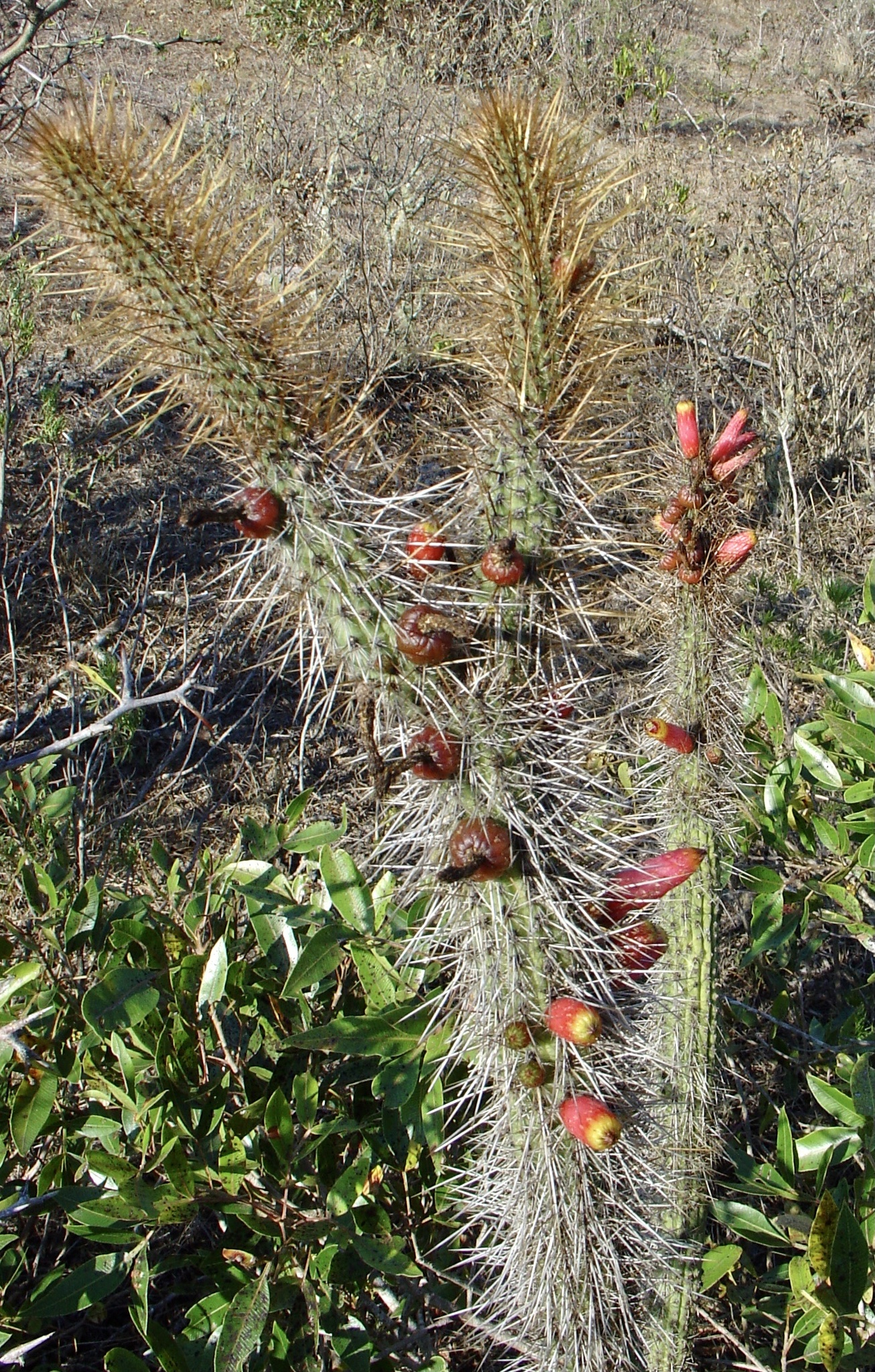
Plant growing in Samaipata, Bolivia

== Taxonomy ==
The first description was in 1952 by Martín Cárdenas. A nomenclature synonym is Echinopsis candelilla (Cárdenas) Anceschi & Magli (2013).

In the IUCN Red List of Threatened Species, the species is listed as "Least Concern (LC)".
