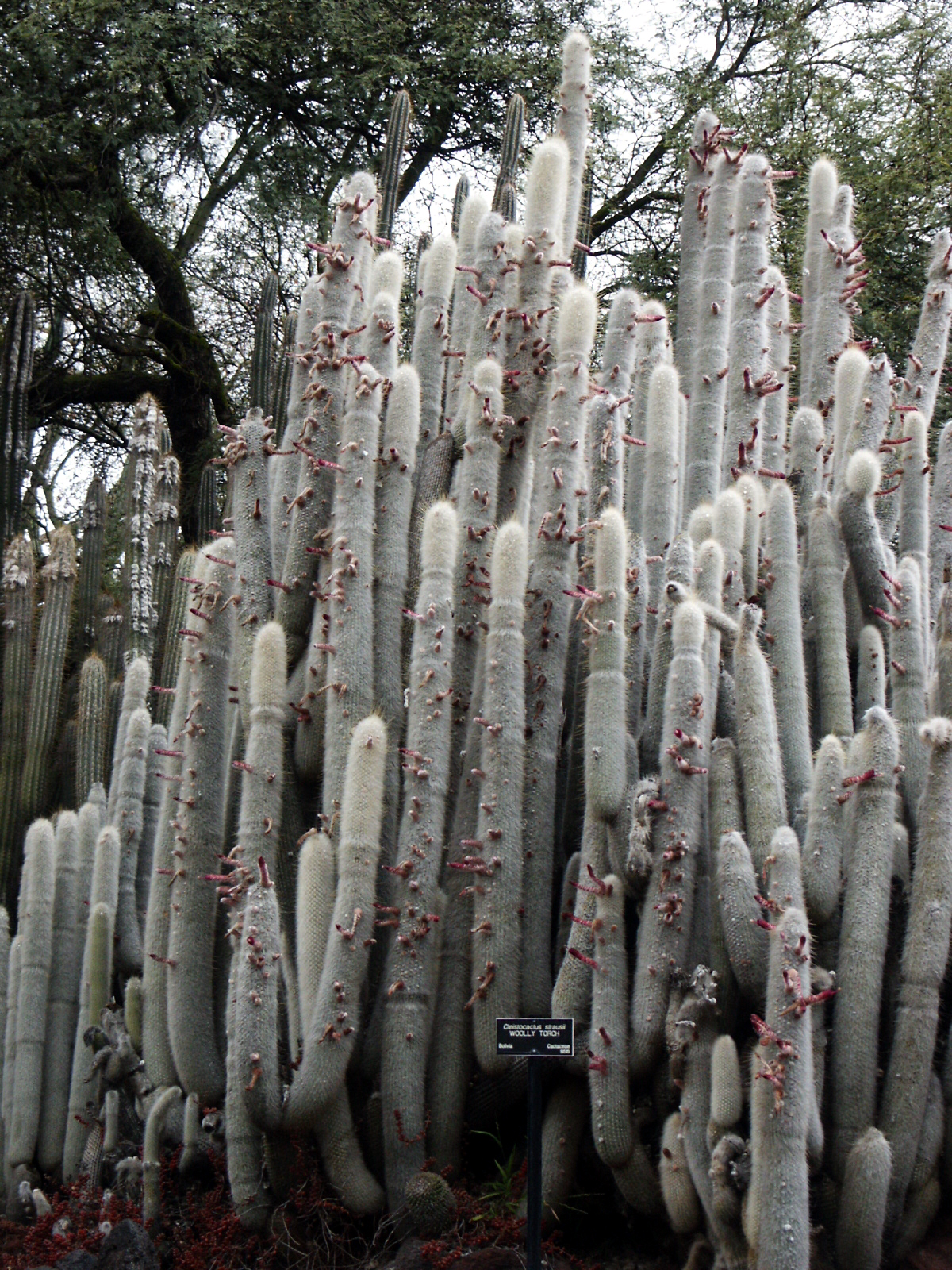
- Cleistocactus strausii

Scientific classification
- Kingdom: Plantae
- Clade: Tracheophytes
- Clade: Angiosperms
- Clade: Eudicots
- Order: Caryophyllales
- Family: Cactaceae
- Subfamily: Cactoideae
- Tribe: Cereeae
- Subtribe: Trichocereinae
- Genus: Cleistocactus; Lem.

Type species
- Cleistocactus baumannii

Species
- See text

Synonyms
- List: Akersia Buining (1961); Bolivicereus Cárdenas (1951); Borzicactella F.Ritter (1981); Cleistocereus Frič & Kreuz. (1936); Clistanthocereus Backeb. (1937); Maritimocereus Akers & Buining (1950); Seticleistocactus Backeb. (1963); Vatricania Backeb. (1950); Winterocereus Backeb. (1966)

= Cleistocactus =

Genus of plants

Cleistocactus is a genus of flowering plants in the cactus family Cactaceae, native to mountainous areas - to 3,000 m (9,843 ft) - of South America (Peru, Uruguay, Bolivia and Argentina). The name comes from the Greek kleistos meaning closed because the flowers hardly open.

== Description ==
The plants of the genus are slender stem succulents that are tall, mostly slender and often many-branched up to about 3 m high. They usually form basally branching shrubs, rarely they branch higher and form small trees. The shoots stand upright and then often hang over as they get older; they usually lie down with their ends rising up; more rarely they grow hanging. They usually have many ribs, closely set areoles and spines. The areoles on the ribs usually have many fine, hair-like spines with a few firmer spines in between; the spines are rarely longer and coarse.

In most species, the flowers appear in large numbers individually from the areoles. The flowers are tubular and the tips hardly open with only the style and stamens usually protruding. In some species (from the earlier genera Borzicereus and Cephalocleistocactus) they appear from conspicuous zones of heavy bristle and hair formation. In adaptation to the pollinators (hummingbirds), the flowers are long, tubular with upright bracts, which are sometimes not or only slightly folded outwards at the tips and thus appear almost closed. They are often slightly zygomorphic due to an upward bend near the base and/or an oblique flower border (longer or straighter at the top, shorter or more folded at the bottom). The flower colors range from green to white, yellow, orange and red to violet, with shades of red predominating. The densely scaled fruits that emerge after fertilization are relatively small, but usually contain numerous seeds.

== Species ==
Species of the genus Cleistocactus according to Plants of the World Online as of October 2025:

Image	Scientific name	Distribution
	Cleistocactus aurantiacus M.Lowry	Bolivia
	Cleistocactus baumannii (Lem.) Lem.	Argentina, Paraguay, Bolivia, Uruguay
	Cleistocactus brookeae Cárdenas	Bolivia
	Cleistocactus buchtienii Backeb.	Bolivia
	Cleistocactus candelilla Cárdenas	Bolivia
	Cleistocactus capadalensis F.Ritter	Bolivia (Chuquisaca)
	Cleistocactus colademononis (Diers & Krahn) Mottram	Bolivia
	Cleistocactus crassicaulis Cárdenas	Bolivia
	Cleistocactus dependens Cárdenas	Bolivia
	Cleistocactus glaucus F.Ritter	Bolivia
	Cleistocactus hildegardiae F.Ritter	Bolivia
	Cleistocactus hyalacanthus (K.Schum.) Rol.-Goss.	Argentina, Bolivia
	Cleistocactus laniceps (K.Schum.) Rol.-Goss.	Bolivia
	Cleistocactus luribayensis Cárdenas	Bolivia
	Cleistocactus morawetzianus Backeb.	Peru
	Cleistocactus orthogonus Cárdenas	Bolivia
	Cleistocactus parviflorus (K.Schum.) Rol.-Goss.	Bolivia
	Cleistocactus pungens F.Ritter	Peru
	Cleistocactus ritteri Backeb.	Bolivia
	Cleistocactus samaipatanus (Cárdenas) D.R.Hunt	Bolivia, Brazil
	Cleistocactus smaragdiflorus (F.A.C.Weber) Britton & Rose	Argentina, Bolivia
	Cleistocactus strausii (Heese) Backeb.	Bolivia
	Cleistocactus tominensis (Weing.) Backeb.	Bolivia
	Cleistocactus variispinus F.Ritter	Bolivia
	Cleistocactus viridiflorus Backeb.	Bolivia (La Paz)
	Cleistocactus winteri D.R.Hunt	Bolivia
