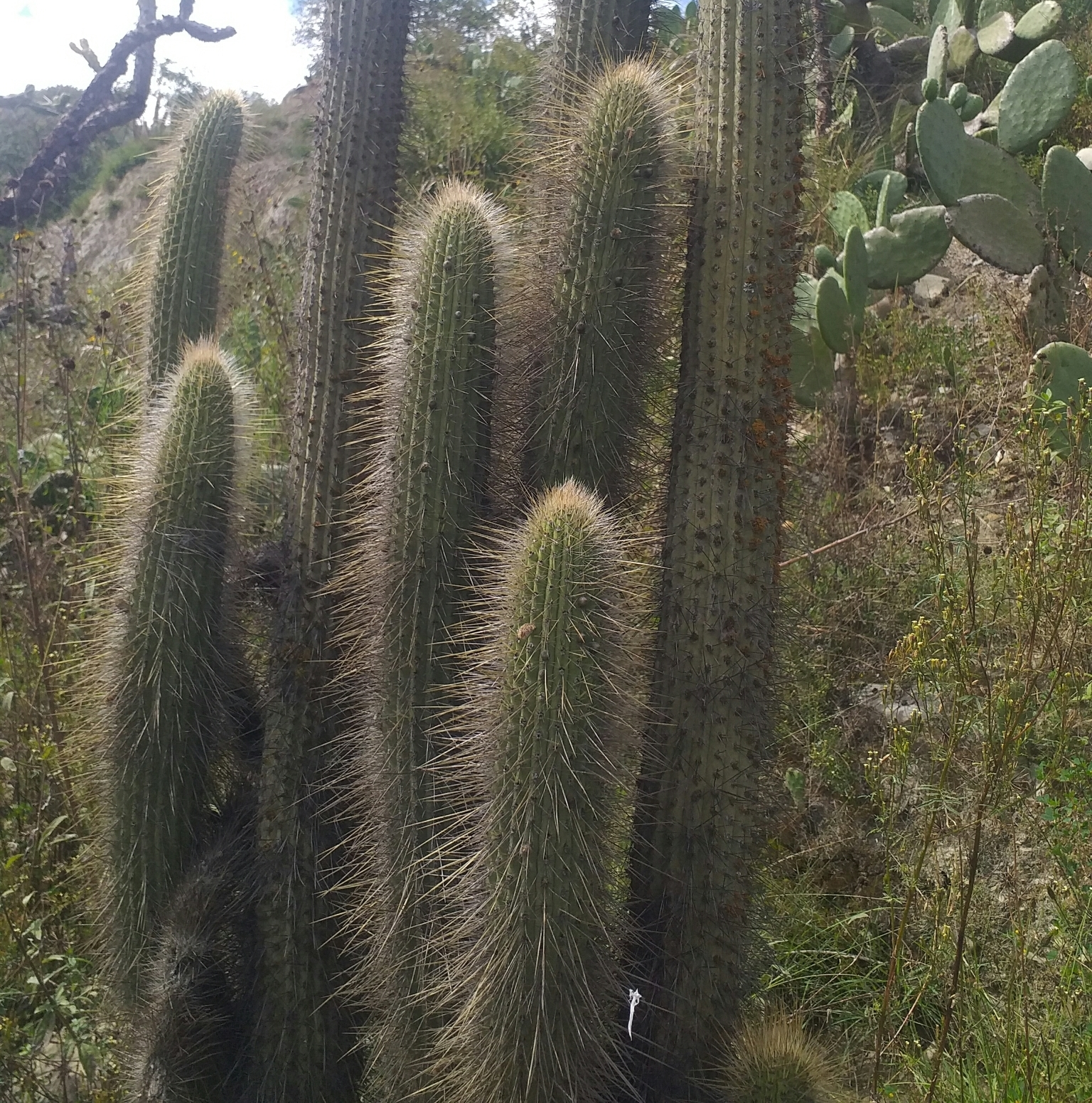

Scientific classification
- Kingdom: Plantae
- Clade: Tracheophytes
- Clade: Angiosperms
- Clade: Eudicots
- Order: Caryophyllales
- Family: Cactaceae
- Subfamily: Cactoideae
- Genus: Cleistocactus
- Species: C. glaucus

Binomial name
- Cleistocactus glaucus F.Ritter, 1964

Synonyms
- Cleistocactus glaucus var. plurispinus F.Ritter 1964; Cleistocactus granjaensis F.Ritter 1980

= Cleistocactus glaucus =

Species of cactus

Cleistocactus glaucus is a species of Cleistocactus found in Bolivia.

== Description ==
Cleistocactus glaucus is a cactus species characterized by greenish-gray, columnar stems that branch from the base. These stems are typically 1 to 2 meters long and 3 to 4 cm (1.2 to 1.6 in) in diameter. The plant features 12 to 18 obtuse, notched ribs that are 3 to 5 mm (0.12 to 0.20 in) high. Areoles are white or brownish, are 2.5 to 4 mm (0.098 to 0.157 in) in diameter and spaced 4 to 6 mm (0.16 to 0.24 in) apart along the ribs. These areoles bear chestnut-colored spines. Among the spines, there are 1 to 3 central spines that are stronger and measure 1 to 2 cm (0.39 to 0.79 in) long and 7 to 9 radial spines that are 0.4 to 0.7 cm (0.16 to 0.28 in) long; the uppermost radial spines are absent.

The flowers of Cleistocactus glaucus are radially symmetrical (actinomorphic), straight, and tubular, measuring 3.2 to 4.2 cm (1.3 to 1.7 in) in length. They are orange-red in color and have an ovary covered with numerous scales. The stamens are white. Like most species in the genus, the flowers only partially open. The fruit is spherical (globose), red, and approximately 1 to 1.5 cm (0.39 to 0.59 in) in diameter. Inside, it contains shiny black seeds that are about 1.25 mm (0.049 in) long and 0.75 mm (0.030 in) wide.

== Distribution ==
This species is native to Bolivia, specifically in the La Paz department in the northwestern part of the country. C. glacus typically grows in the seasonally dry tropical ecosystems.

== Taxonomy ==
Cleistocactus glaucus was first described by the German botanist Friedrich Ritter in the scientific journal Taxon in 1964.
