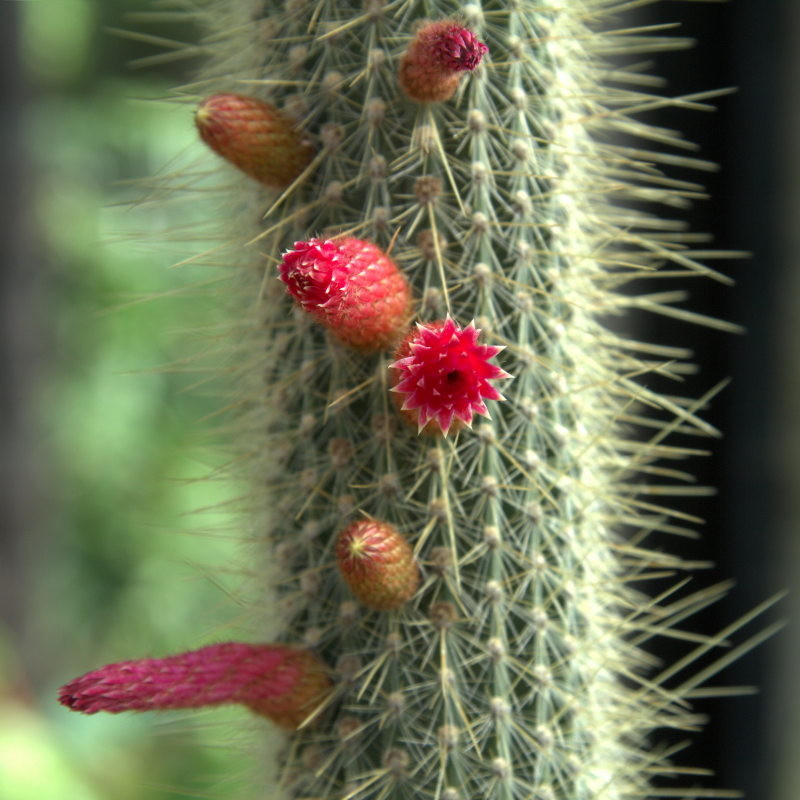

Conservation status
- Least Concern (IUCN 3.1)

Scientific classification
- Kingdom: Plantae
- Clade: Embryophytes
- Clade: Tracheophytes
- Clade: Spermatophytes
- Clade: Angiosperms
- Clade: Eudicots
- Order: Caryophyllales
- Family: Cactaceae
- Subfamily: Cactoideae
- Genus: Cleistocactus
- Species: C. parviflorus

Binomial name
- Cleistocactus parviflorus (K.Schum.) Rol.-Goss. 1904

Synonyms
- Cereus parviflorus K.Schum. 1897; Echinopsis parviflora (K.Schum.) Anceschi & Magli 2013; Cereus areolatus K.Schum. 1897; Cleistocactus areolatus (K.Schum.) Riccob. 1909; Cleistocactus areolatus var. herzogianus (Backeb.) Backeb. 1959; Cleistocactus fusiflorus Cárdenas 1957; Cleistocactus herzogianus Backeb. 1934; Cleistocactus ianthinus Cárdenas 1956; Cleistocactus parviflorus var. aiquilensis F.Ritter 1963; Cleistocactus parviflorus var. comarapanus F.Ritter 1980; Cleistocactus parviflorus var. herzogianus (Backeb.) Backeb. 1963; Cleistocactus vallegrandensis Cárdenas 1961

= Cleistocactus parviflorus =

Species of cactus

Cleistocactus parviflorus is a species of columnar cacti in the genus Cleistocactus.

== Description ==
Cleistocactus parviflorus grows as a shrub with upright, green shoots that are slightly branched at the base and reaches heights of up to 3 meters with diameters of up to 4 centimeters. There are 12 to 15 clearly notched ribs. The different colored spines are brown to yellowish to greenish. The 1 to 3 central spines are thicker and yellow up to 2.5 centimeters long, the 5 to 9 radial spines are up to 4 millimeters long. The straight, red flowers are 2.5 to 3.5 centimeters long, 8 millimeter wide, red and yellow, with purple tepals. The yellow fruits are up to 1 centimeter in diameter.

== Distribution ==
Cleistocactus parviflorus found in the dry montane forest of the Bolivian departments of Santa Cruz and Cochabamba at altitudes of 1,400 to 3,000 meters.

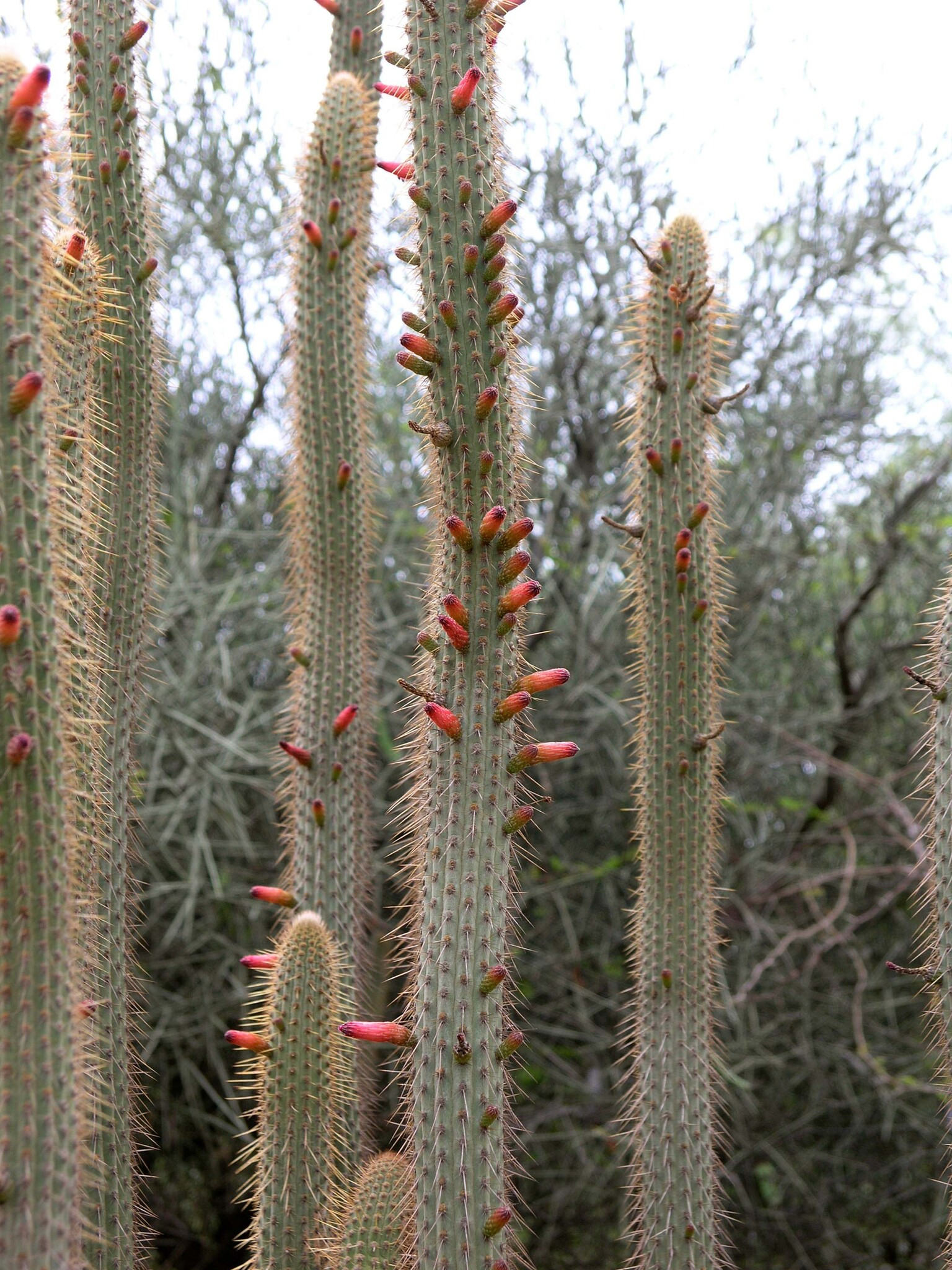
Habitat in San Isidro, Bolivia

== Taxonomy ==
The first description as Cereus parviflorus was made in 1897 by Karl Moritz Schumann. The specific epithet 'parviflorus' is derived from the Latin words parvus for 'small' and -florus for '-flowered'. Robert Roland-Gosselin placed the species in the genus Cleistocactus in 1904. A nomenclature synonym is Echinopsis parviflora (K.Schum.) Anceschi & Magli (2013).
