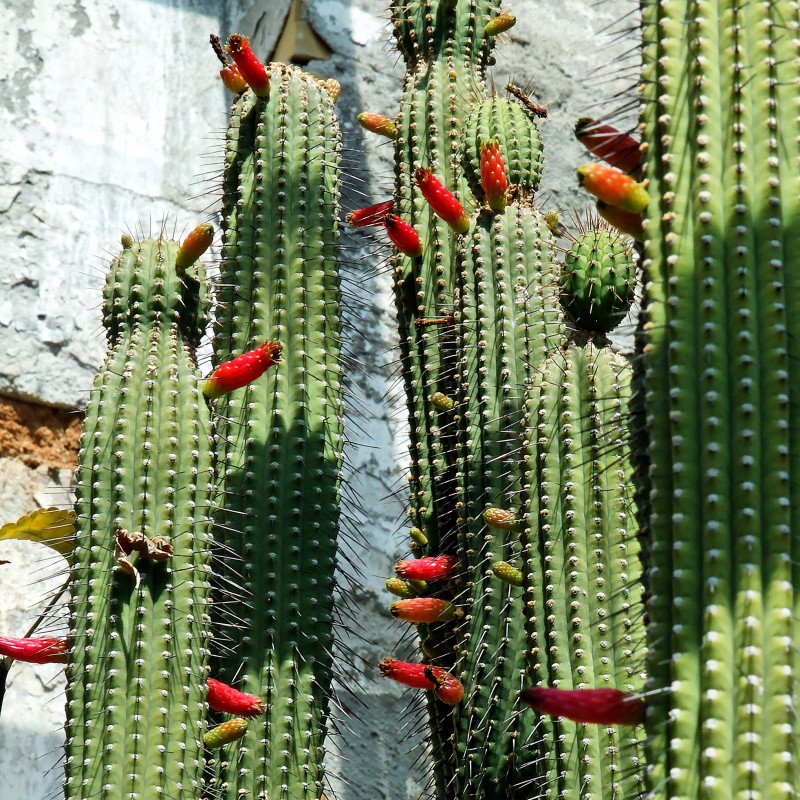

Conservation status
- Least Concern (IUCN 3.1)

Scientific classification
- Kingdom: Plantae
- Clade: Embryophytes
- Clade: Tracheophytes
- Clade: Spermatophytes
- Clade: Angiosperms
- Clade: Eudicots
- Order: Caryophyllales
- Family: Cactaceae
- Subfamily: Cactoideae
- Genus: Cleistocactus
- Species: C. laniceps

Binomial name
- Cleistocactus laniceps (K.Schum.) Rol.-Goss. 1904

Synonyms
- Borzicactus laniceps (K.Schum.) Backeb. 1932; Cereus laniceps K.Schum. 1897; Echinopsis laniceps (K.Schum.) Anceschi & Magli 2021; Cleistocactus laniceps var. plurispinus F.Ritter 1980

= Cleistocactus laniceps =

Species of cactus

Cleistocactus laniceps is a species of columnar cacti in the genus Cleistocactus.

== Description ==
Cleistocactus laniceps grows as a shrub with several shoots and reaches a height of up to 4 meters with a diameter of up to 5 cm (2.0 in). There are about 9 blunt ribs. The large areoles on it have conspicuously gray fealty wool. The three gray thorns are submissive and up to 1.5 cm (0.59 in) long.

The presumably red flowers are up to 3.5 cm (1.4 in) long. The somewhat curved flower tube is quite woolly. The outer bracts are slightly spread. The spherical, red, densely woolly fruits are no larger than 1 cm (0.39 in) in diameter.

== Distribution ==
Cleistocactus laniceps is distributed in the Bolivian departments of La Paz and Cochabamba in the Yungas at altitudes of 1300 to 2500 meters.

== Taxonomy ==
The first description as Cereus laniceps was in 1897 by Karl Moritz Schumann. The specific epithet laniceps is derived from the Latin words lana for 'wool' and -ceps for 'head' and refers to the heavily woolly areoles of the species. Robert Roland-Gosselin placed the species in the genus Cleistocactus in 1904. Another nomenclature synonym is Borzicactus laniceps (K.Schum.) Backeb. (1932).
