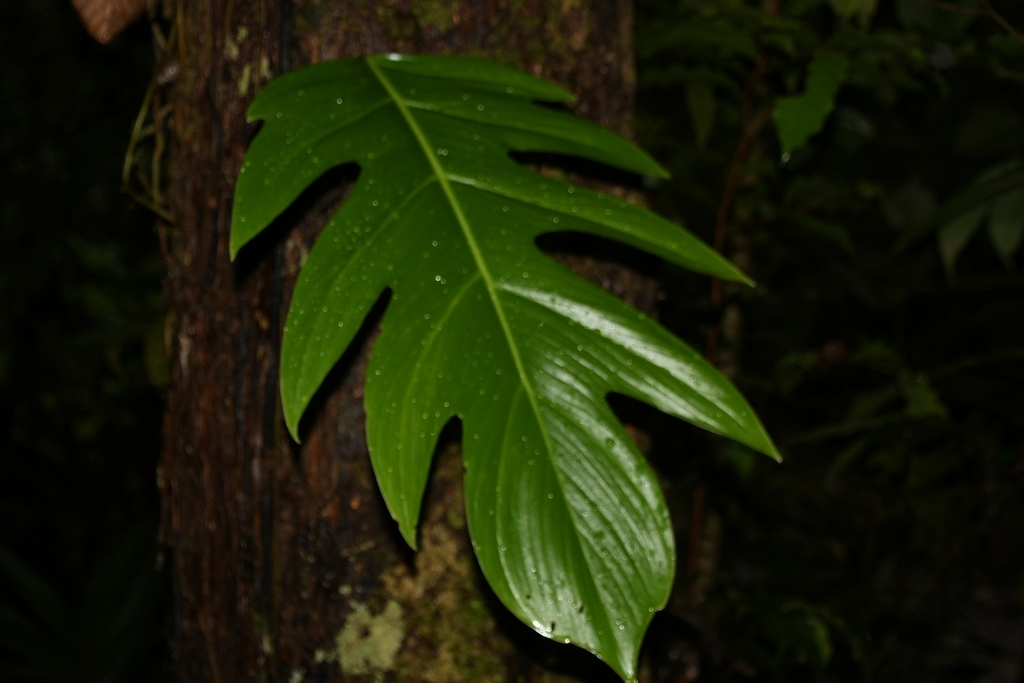

Scientific classification
- Kingdom: Plantae
- Clade: Tracheophytes
- Clade: Angiosperms
- Clade: Monocots
- Order: Alismatales
- Family: Araceae
- Genus: Alloschemone
- Species: A. occidentalis

Binomial name
- Alloschemone occidentalis (Poepp.) Engl. & K.Krause

= Alloschemone occidentalis =

Species of plant

Alloschemone occidentalis is a flowering plant in genus Alloschemone of the arum family Araceae.

It was once included in Scindapsus, but was re-classified into Alloschemone.

== Distribution ==
Its native range is north Brazil to Bolivia.
