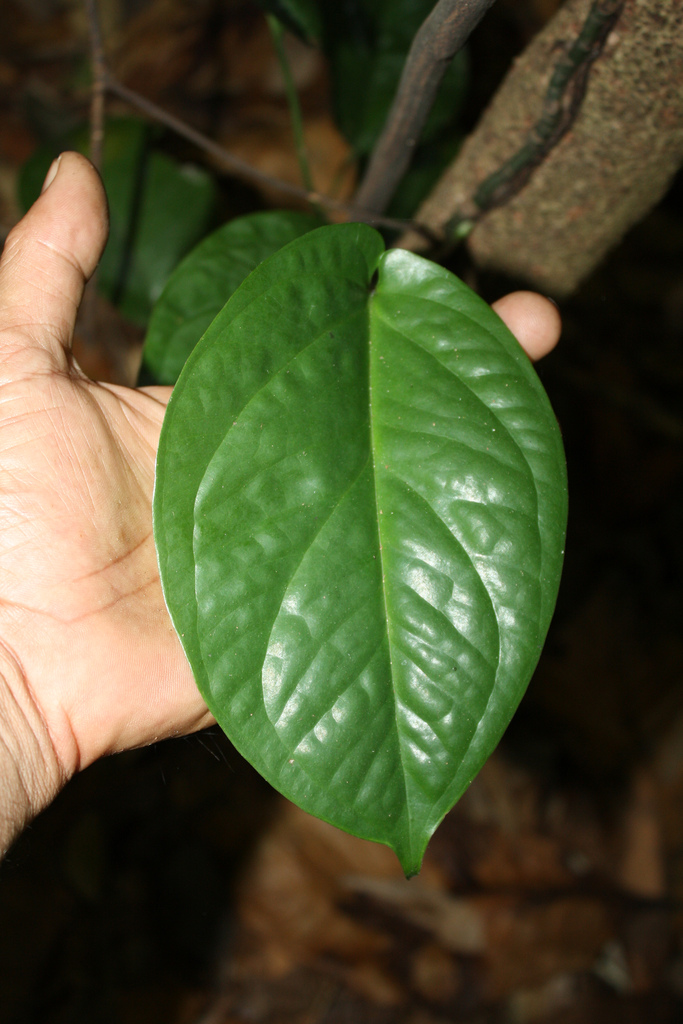
- Amydrium medium

Scientific classification
- Kingdom: Plantae
- Clade: Tracheophytes
- Clade: Angiosperms
- Clade: Monocots
- Order: Alismatales
- Family: Araceae
- Genus: Amydrium
- Species: A. medium

Binomial name
- Amydrium medium (Zoll. & Moritzi) Nicolson

= Amydrium medium =

Species of plant

Amydrium medium is an epiphytic/hemiepiphytic, vining flowering plant in the arum (aroid) family, Araceae, that is native to Southeast Asia.

In modern times, Amydrium medium has become more well-known and obtainable on the plant market, largely thanks to tissue culture. Along with the type species, with its typical green leaves, several cultivars have been developed, including the teal-blue, light-gray foliage of A. medium 'Silver', or the web-like patterning of A. medium 'Spiderman'. There are also few variegated forms, such as the white-and-green marbling of 'Albo Variegata' or the lime-green and yellow-"swirled" foliage of 'Galaxy' and 'Mint'. However, despite its commercial availability, the genera Amydrium, as a whole, is still relatively unknown amongst plant hobbyists, being outcompeted by other, related genera, such as Epipremnum, Monstera, Philodendron, Scindapsus and Syngonium, to name a few.

== Distribution ==
Amydrium medium's native range is west from mainland Southeast Asia (Cambodia, Malaysia, Myanmar, Singapore, Thailand) and east through certain islands of Indonesia and the Philippines.
