= Alloschemone inopinata =

Scientific classification
- Kingdom: Plantae
- Clade: Tracheophytes
- Clade: Angiosperms
- Clade: Monocots
- Order: Alismatales
- Family: Araceae
- Genus: Alloschemone
- Species: A. inopinata

Binomial name
- Alloschemone inopinata Bogner & P.C.Boyce

Species of flowering plant

Alloschemone inopinata is a species of flowering plant in the genus Alloschemone of the arum family Araceae.

It was once included in Scindapsus, but was re-classified info Alloschemone.

== Distribution ==
Its native range is northern Brazil (Amazonas).
