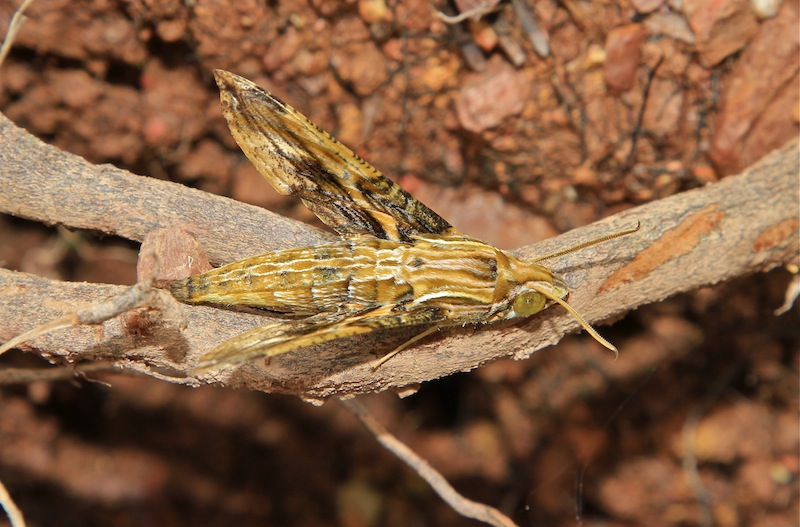

Scientific classification
- Kingdom: Animalia
- Phylum: Arthropoda
- Class: Insecta
- Order: Lepidoptera
- Family: Sphingidae
- Genus: Eupanacra
- Species: E. variolosa

Binomial name
- Eupanacra variolosa (Walker, 1856)

Synonyms
- Panacra variolosa Walker, 1856; Panacra hamiltoni Rothschild, 1894; Panacra vagans Butler, 1881

= Eupanacra variolosa =

Species of moth

Eupanacra variolosa, the grown rippled hawkmoth, is a moth of the family Sphingidae.

== Distribution ==
It is known from north-eastern India, Bangladesh, south-western China, Thailand, Malaysia (Peninsular, Sarawak) and Indonesia (Sumatra, Java, Kalimantan).

== Description ==
The wingspan is 56–80 mm.

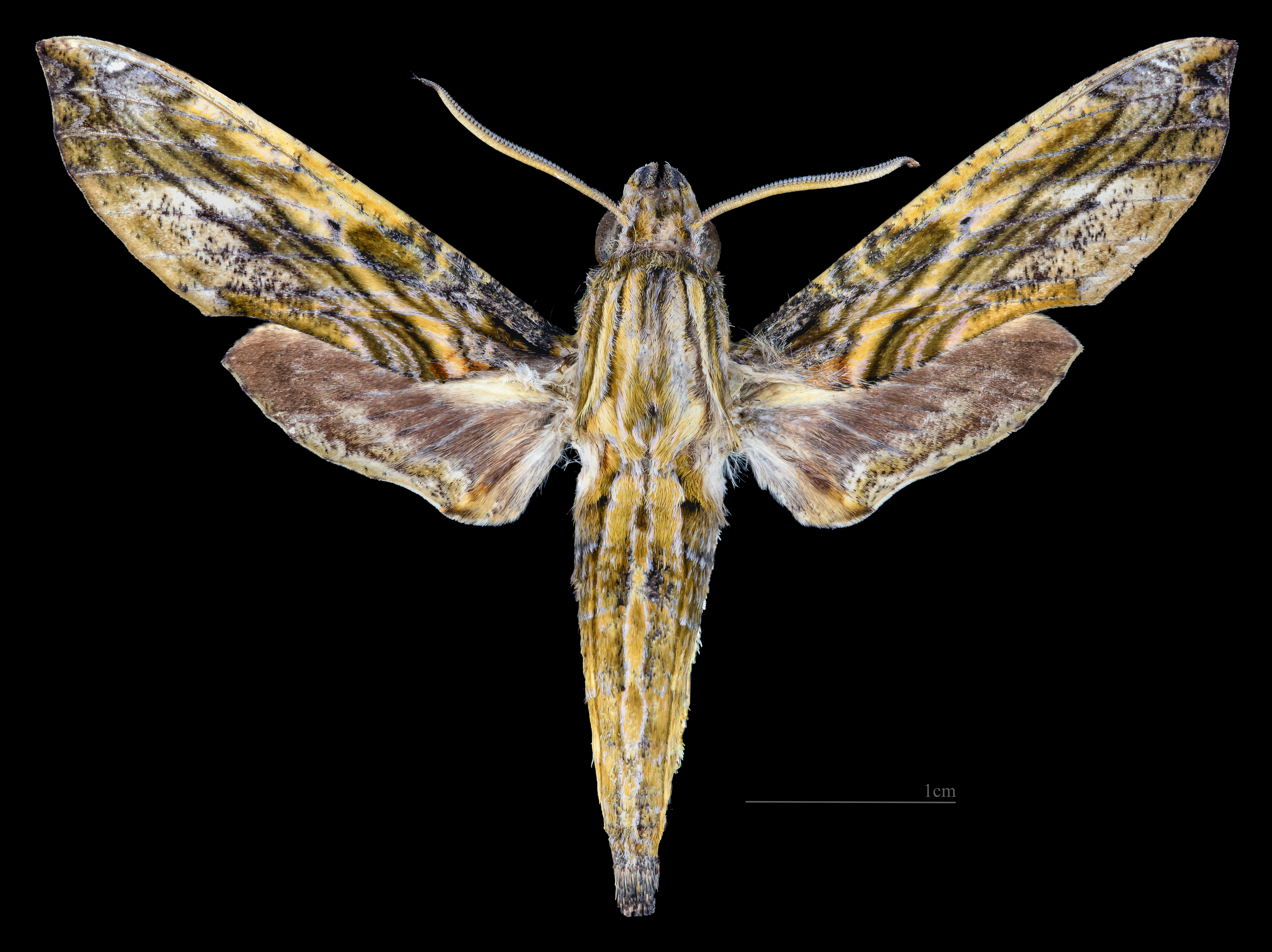
Male dorsal

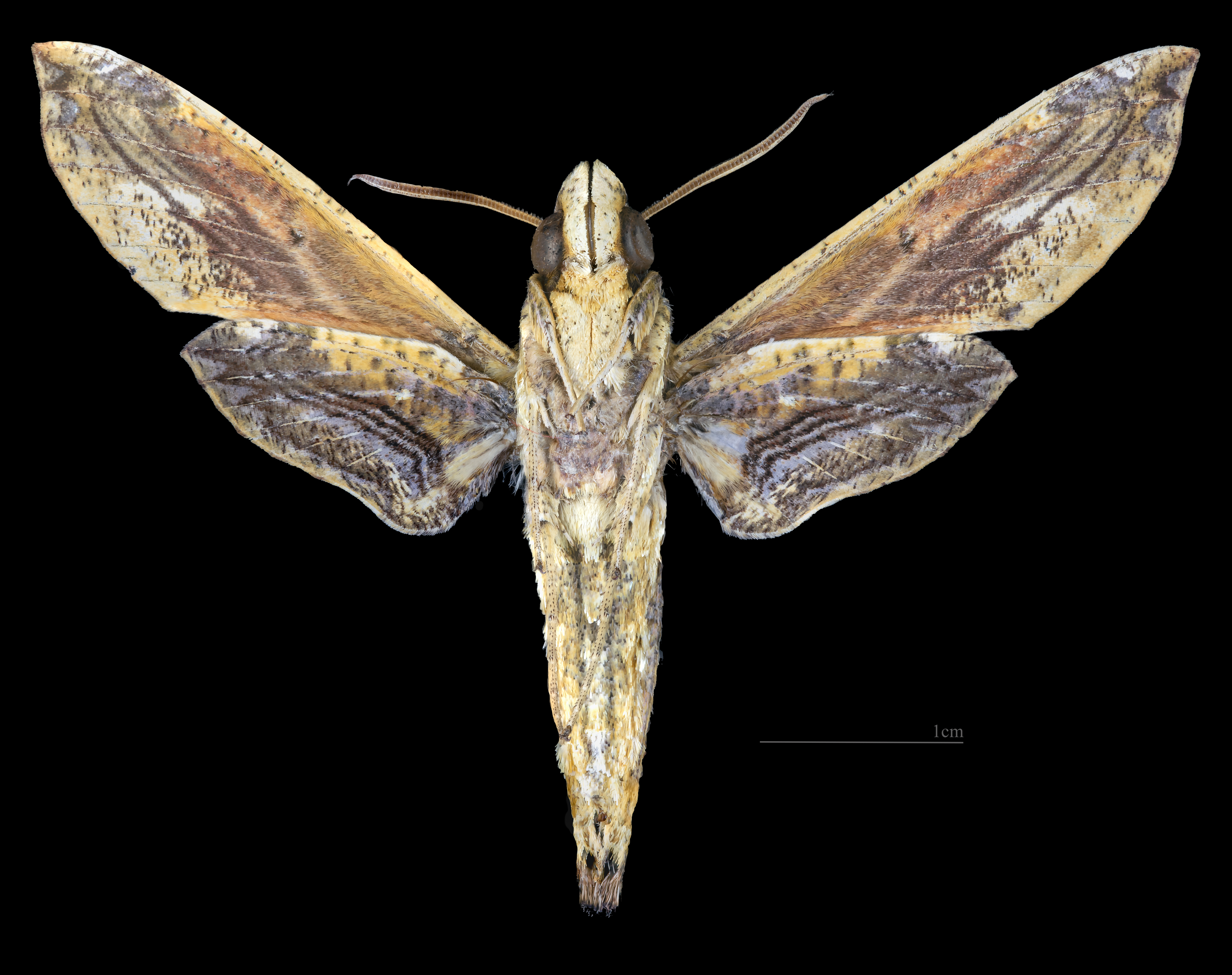
Male ventral

== Biology ==
The larvae feed on satin pothos and golden pothos in Thailand.
