= Philodendron atabapoense =

Scientific classification
- Kingdom: Plantae
- Clade: Tracheophytes
- Clade: Angiosperms
- Clade: Monocots
- Order: Alismatales
- Family: Araceae
- Genus: Philodendron
- Species: P. atabapoense

Binomial name
- Philodendron atabapoense G.S.Bunting

Species of plant

Philodendron atabapoense is a species of flowering plant in the family Araceae. It is native to Amazonas state of Venezuela. A climber in wet tropical forests, it is a common ornamental plant in Nigeria.
