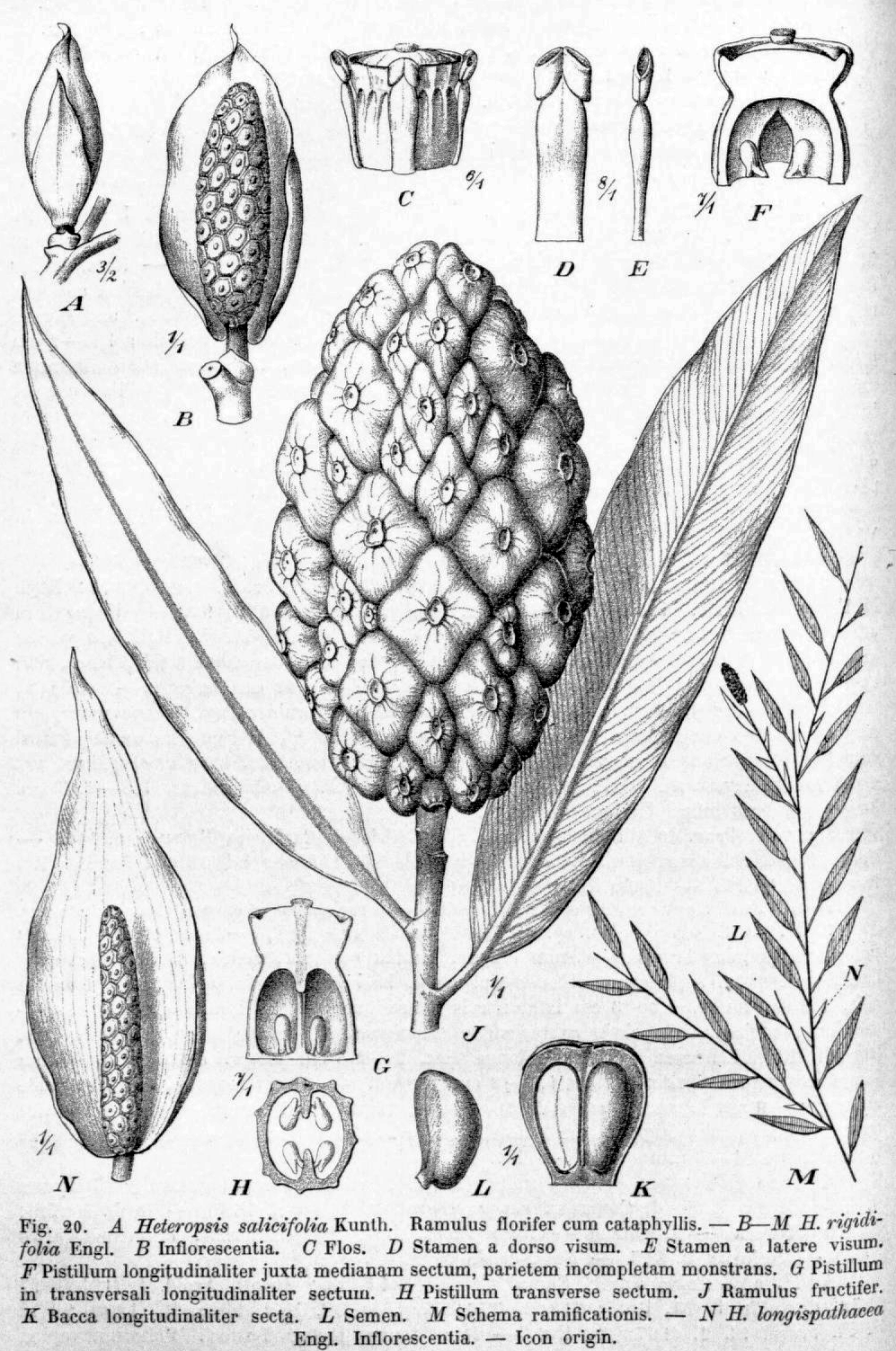
- Heteropsis salicifolia 1905 illustration

Scientific classification
- Kingdom: Plantae
- Clade: Tracheophytes
- Clade: Angiosperms
- Clade: Monocots
- Order: Alismatales
- Family: Araceae
- Subfamily: Monsteroideae
- Tribe: Heteropsideae
- Genus: Heteropsis; Kunth 1841

= Heteropsis (plant) =

Genus of flowering plants

Heteropsis is a genus of plants in the family Araceae, native to Central and South America.

== Species ==
- Heteropsis boliviana Rusby - Bolivia
- Heteropsis croatii M.L.Soares - Peru, northwestern Brazil
- Heteropsis duckeana M.L.Soares - northwestern Brazil
- Heteropsis ecuadorensis Sodiro - Ecuador
- Heteropsis flexuosa (Kunth) G.S.Bunting - Colombia, Venezuela, the Guianas, Ecuador, Peru, Bolivia, northwestern Brazil
- Heteropsis linearis A.C.Sm. - Peru, northwestern Brazil
- Heteropsis longispathacea Engl. - northwestern Brazil
- Heteropsis macrophylla A.C.Sm. - Amazonas State of northwestern Brazil
- Heteropsis melinonii (Engl.) A.M.E.Jonker & Jonker - Venezuela, the Guianas
- Heteropsis oblongifolia Kunth - Central America, Colombia, Peru, Bolivia, Brazil
- Heteropsis peruviana K.Krause - Ecuador, Peru, Bolivia, northwestern Brazil
- Heteropsis rigidifolia Engl. - southeastern Brazil
- Heteropsis robusta (G.S.Bunting) M.L.Soares - Colombia, Venezuela, Peru, Ecuador, northwestern Brazil
- Heteropsis salicifolia Kunth - eastern Brazil
- Heteropsis spruceana Schott - Colombia, Venezuela, the Guianas, Ecuador, northwestern Brazil
- Heteropsis steyermarkii G.S.Bunting - Colombia, Venezuela, French Guinea, Peru, northwestern Brazil
- Heteropsis tenuispadix G.S.Bunting - Colombia, Venezuela, the Guianas, Peru, Bolivia, northwestern Brazil
