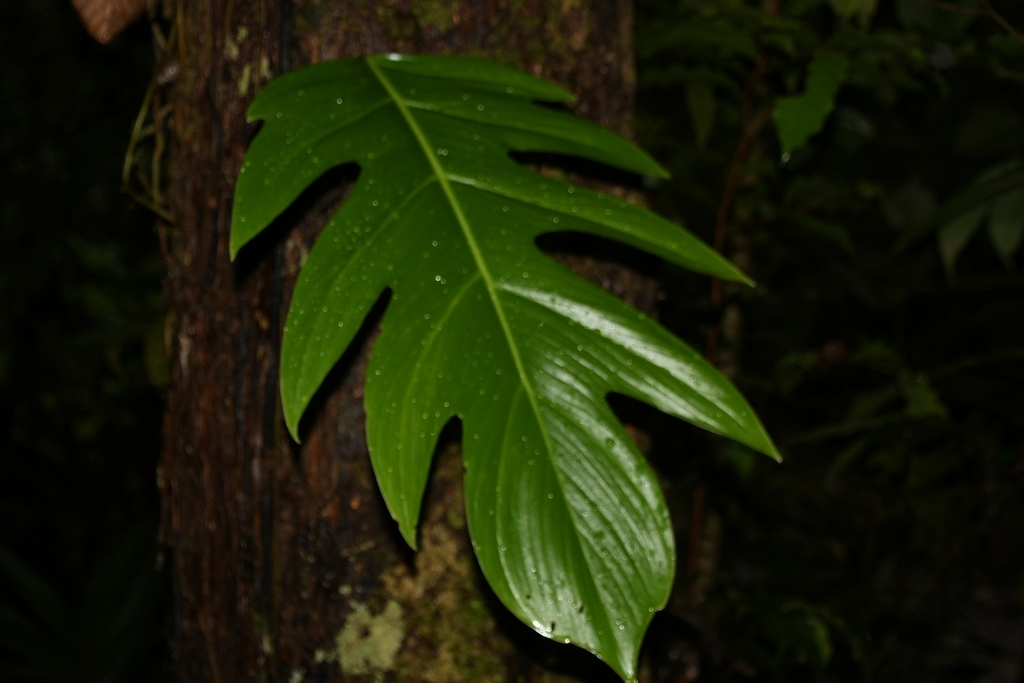
- Alloschemone occidentallis

Scientific classification
- Kingdom: Plantae
- Clade: Embryophytes
- Clade: Tracheophytes
- Clade: Spermatophytes
- Clade: Angiosperms
- Clade: Monocots
- Order: Alismatales
- Family: Araceae
- Subfamily: Monsteroideae
- Tribe: Monstereae
- Genus: Alloschemone; Schott

= Alloschemone =

Genus of flowering plants

Alloschemone is a genus of evergreen root climbing plants in the family Araceae that is native to the Amazon region of Bolivia and Brazil. There are only two species in the genus and both are extremely rare. These two species are Alloschemone occidentalis and Alloschemone inopinata. At one point in history, the genus Alloschemone was dissolved and added to Scindapsus, but it has since been reinstated after further observations of the plants.

== Species ==
1. Alloschemone inopinata Bogner & P.C.Boyce - Amazonas State of western Brazil
2. Alloschemone occidentalis (Poepp.) Engl. & K.Krause - Brazil and Bolivia
