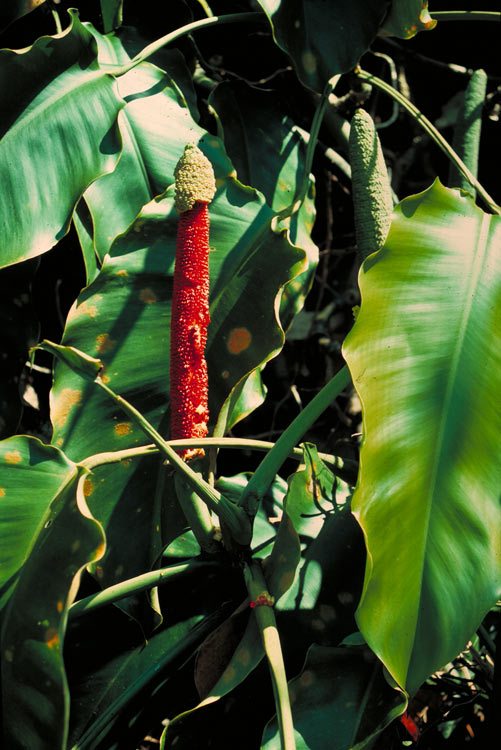
- Fruit

Conservation status
- Least Concern (NCA)

Scientific classification
- Kingdom: Plantae
- Clade: Tracheophytes
- Clade: Angiosperms
- Clade: Monocots
- Order: Alismatales
- Family: Araceae
- Genus: Scindapsus
- Species: S. altissimus

Binomial name
- Scindapsus altissimus Alderw.

= Scindapsus altissimus =

Species of flowering plant

Scindapsus altissimus is a species of plant in the arum family Araceae. It is a climber native to New Guinea, the Solomon Islands and northeast Queensland, Australia. It was first described in 1922 by Dutch botanist Cornelius R.W.K. van Alderwerelt van Rosenburgh.
