= Amydrium hainanense =

Conservation status
- Least Concern (IUCN 3.1)

Scientific classification
- Kingdom: Plantae
- Clade: Tracheophytes
- Clade: Angiosperms
- Clade: Monocots
- Order: Alismatales
- Family: Araceae
- Genus: Amydrium
- Species: A. hainanense

Binomial name
- Amydrium hainanense (H.Li, Y.Shiao & S.L.Tseng) H.Li

Species of flowering plant

Amydrium hainanense is a species of flowering plant in genus Amydrium and arum family, Araceae.

== Distribution ==
The native range is South China to North Vietnam.
