= Scindapsus treubii =

Scientific classification
- Kingdom: Plantae
- Clade: Tracheophytes
- Clade: Angiosperms
- Clade: Monocots
- Order: Alismatales
- Family: Araceae
- Genus: Scindapsus
- Species: S. treubii

Binomial name
- Scindapsus treubii Engl.

Synonyms
- Pothos enderianus N.E.Br.

Species of plant

Scindapsus treubii is a species of flowering plant in the family Araceae. It is native to Peninsular Malaysia, northwestern Borneo, and Java. A climber, it is typically found in tropical rainforests. As a houseplant it is valued for its patterned leaves, and there are two cultivars; 'Dark Form' with nearly black older leaves, and 'Moonlight' with a silvery gloss.
