= Amydrium sinense =

Conservation status
- Least Concern (IUCN 3.1)

Scientific classification
- Kingdom: Plantae
- Clade: Tracheophytes
- Clade: Angiosperms
- Clade: Monocots
- Order: Alismatales
- Family: Araceae
- Genus: Amydrium
- Species: A. sinense

Binomial name
- Amydrium sinense (Engl.) H.Li

Synonyms
- Epipremnopsis sinensis (Engl.) H.Li; Scindapsus sinensis Engl.; Rhaphidophora dunniana H.Lév.

Species of plant

Amydrium sinense is a flowering plant in genus Amydrium of the arum family Araceae.

== Distribution ==
Its native range is South China to North Vietnam.
