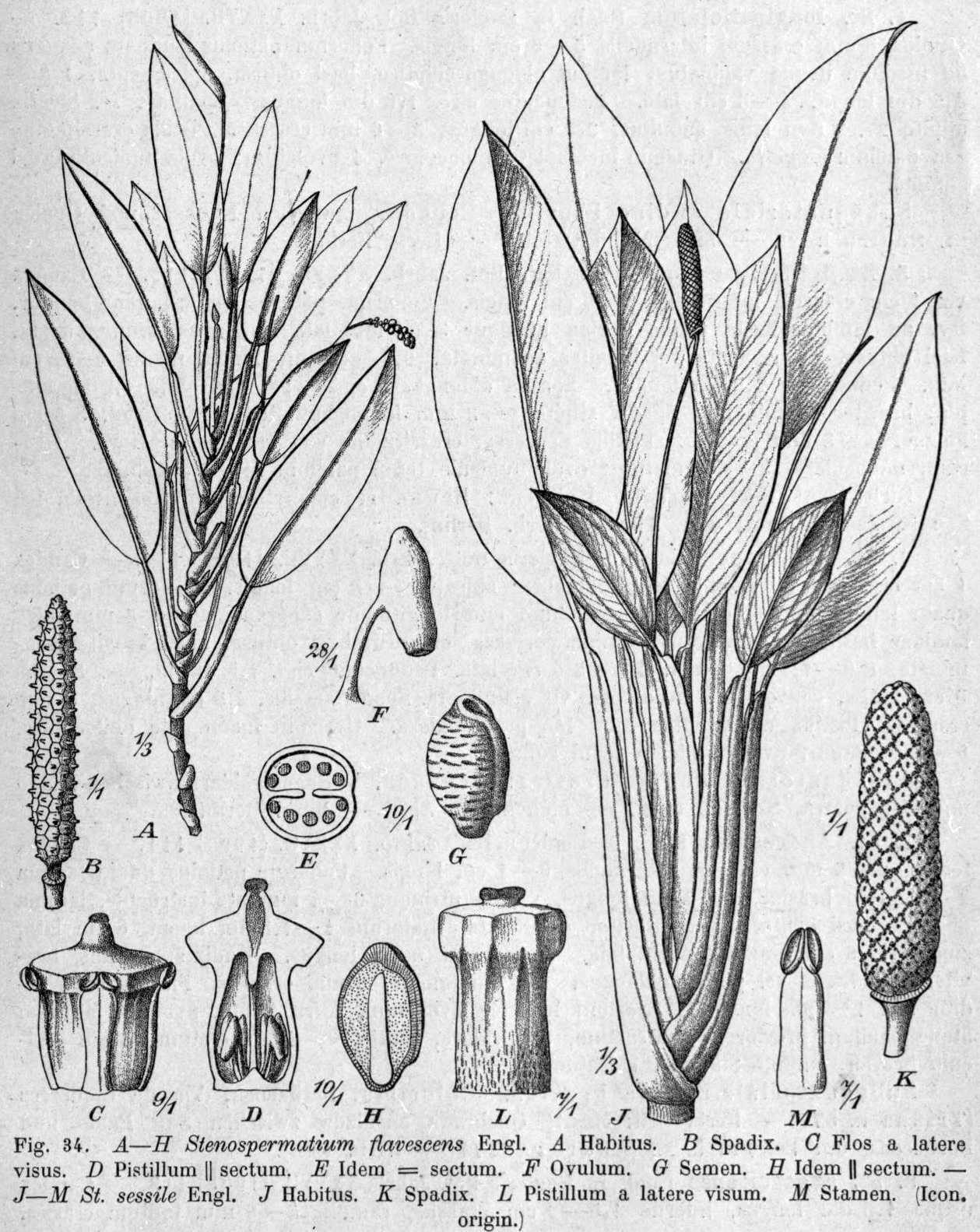
- Stenospermation flavescens 1908 illustration

Scientific classification
- Kingdom: Plantae
- Clade: Tracheophytes
- Clade: Angiosperms
- Clade: Monocots
- Order: Alismatales
- Family: Araceae
- Tribe: Monstereae
- Genus: Stenospermation; Schott

= Stenospermation =

Genus of plants

Stenospermation is a genus of plant in family Araceae native to South America and Central America.

== Species ==
Some species classified under the genus are the following:

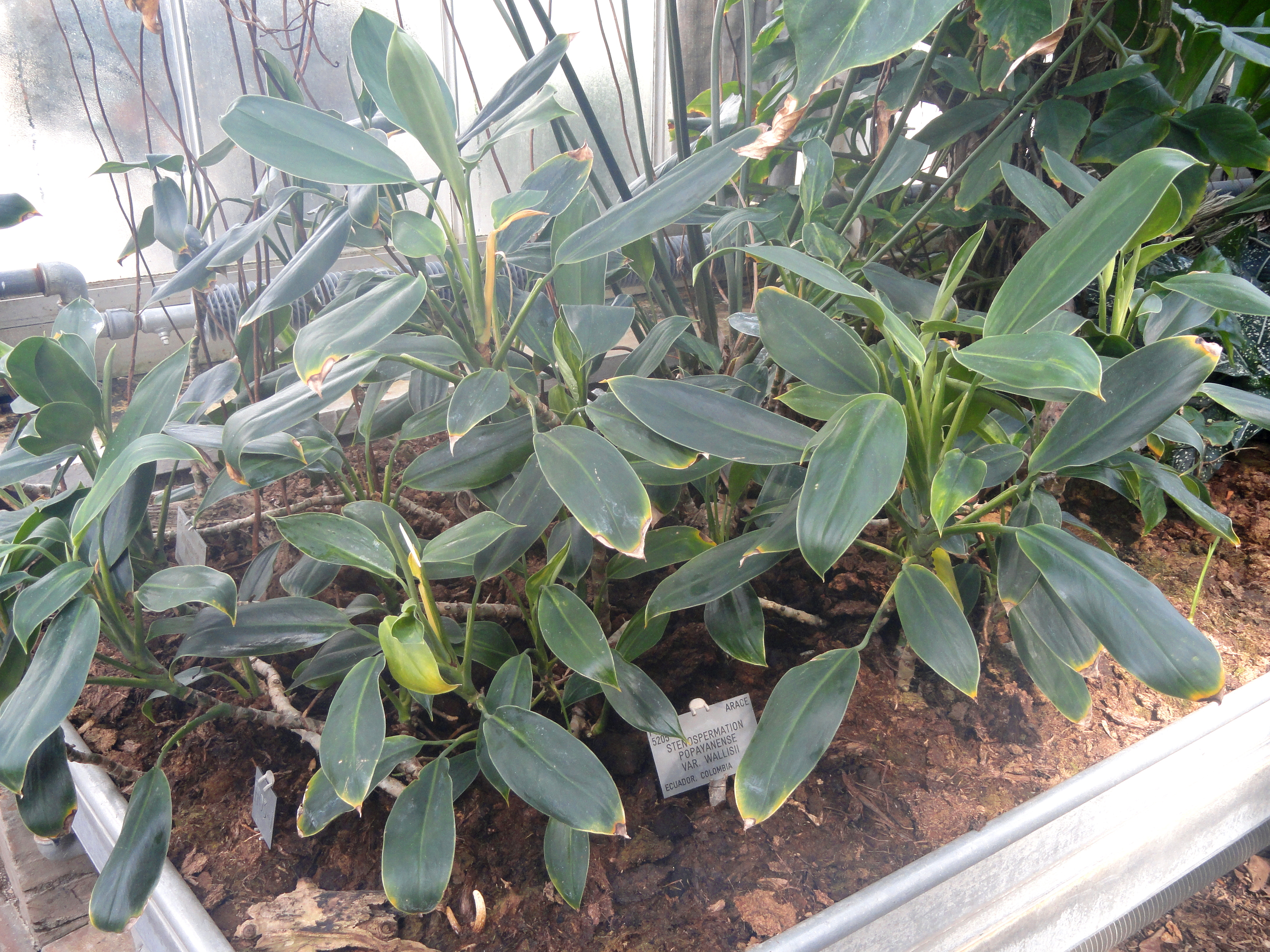
Stenospermation popayanense var. wallisii

- Stenospermation adsimile Sodiro - Ecuador, Peru, Bolivia
- Stenospermation ammiticum G.S.Bunting - Venezuela, Guyana
- Stenospermation amomifolium (Poepp.) Schott - Venezuela, Colombia, Ecuador, Peru
- Stenospermation ancuashii Croat - Peru
- Stenospermation andreanum Engl. - Panama, Colombia, Ecuador
- Stenospermation angosturense Engl. - Colombia, Ecuador
- Stenospermation angustifolium Hemsl. - Costa Rica, Nicaragua, Honduras, Panama, Colombia, Ecuador, Peru
- Stenospermation arborescens Madison - Ecuador
- Stenospermation archeri K.Krause - Colombia
- Stenospermation benavidesae Croat - Colombia
- Stenospermation brachypodum Sodiro - Ecuador
- Stenospermation crassifolium Engl. - Peru
- Stenospermation densiovulatum Engl. - Ecuador
- Stenospermation dictyoneurum Croat & Acebey - Bolivia
- Stenospermation ellipticum Croat & D.C.Bay - Valle del Cauca in Colombia
- Stenospermation escobariae Croat & D.C.Bay - Valle del Cauca in Colombia
- Stenospermation flavescens Engl. - Ecuador
- Stenospermation flavum Croat & D.C.Bay - Valle del Cauca in Colombia
- Stenospermation gentryi Croat - Colombia
- Stenospermation glaucophyllum Croat & D.C.Bay - Valle del Cauca in Colombia
- Stenospermation gracile Sodiro - Ecuador, Peru
- Stenospermation hilligii Sodiro - Ecuador
- Stenospermation interruptum Sodiro - Ecuador
- Stenospermation laevis Croat - Colombia
- Stenospermation latifolium Engl. - Ecuador
- Stenospermation longifolium Engl. - Ecuador, Colombia
- Stenospermation longipetiolatum Engl. - Ecuador
- Stenospermation longispadix Croat - Colombia
- Stenospermation maguirei A.M.E.Jonker & Jonker - Guyana, Suriname
- Stenospermation majus Grayum - Costa Rica
- Stenospermation marantifolium Hemsl. - Costa Rica, Nicaragua, Panama
- Stenospermation mathewsii Schott - Ecuador, Peru, Bolivia
- Stenospermation monsalvae Croat & D.C.Bay - Valle del Cauca in Colombia
- Stenospermation multiovulatum (Engl.) N.E.Br. - Guatemala, Ecuador, Colombia, Venezuela, Peru, the Guianas, northwestern Brazil
- Stenospermation nebulense G.S.Bunting - Amazonas State in southern Venezuela
- Stenospermation olgae Croat- Colombia
- Stenospermation parvum Croat & A.Gomez - Ecuador
- Stenospermation peripense Sodiro - Ecuador
- Stenospermation pittieri Steyerm - Táchira State in western Venezuela
- Stenospermation popayanense Schott - Ecuador, Colombia
- Stenospermation pteropus Grayum - Costa Rica
- Stenospermation robustum Engl. - Costa Rica, Panama, Colombia, Peru
- Stenospermation rusbyi N.E.Br. - Ecuador, Bolivia
- Stenospermation sessile Engl. - Costa Rica, Panama
- Stenospermation spruceanum Schott - Guatemala, Costa Rica, Panama, Colombia, Venezuela, Peru, the Guianas, northwestern Brazil
- Stenospermation subellipticum Sodiro - Ecuador
- Stenospermation ulei K.Krause - Venezuela, Guyana, northwestern Brazil
- Stenospermation velutinum Croat & D.C.Bay - Valle del Cauca in Colombia
- Stenospermation wallisii Mast. - Ecuador, Colombia, Peru
- Stenospermation zeacarpium Madison - Ecuador, Huánuco region of Peru
