= Rhodospatha densinervia =

Scientific classification
- Kingdom: Plantae
- Clade: Tracheophytes
- Clade: Angiosperms
- Clade: Monocots
- Order: Alismatales
- Family: Araceae
- Genus: Rhodospatha
- Species: R. densinervia

Binomial name
- Rhodospatha densinervia Engl. & K.Krause

Synonyms
- Rhodospatha dammeri Sodiro; Rhodospatha macrophylla Sodiro

Species of flowering plant

Rhodospatha densinervia is a species of flowering plant in the family Araceae. It is native to Colombia and Ecuador.
