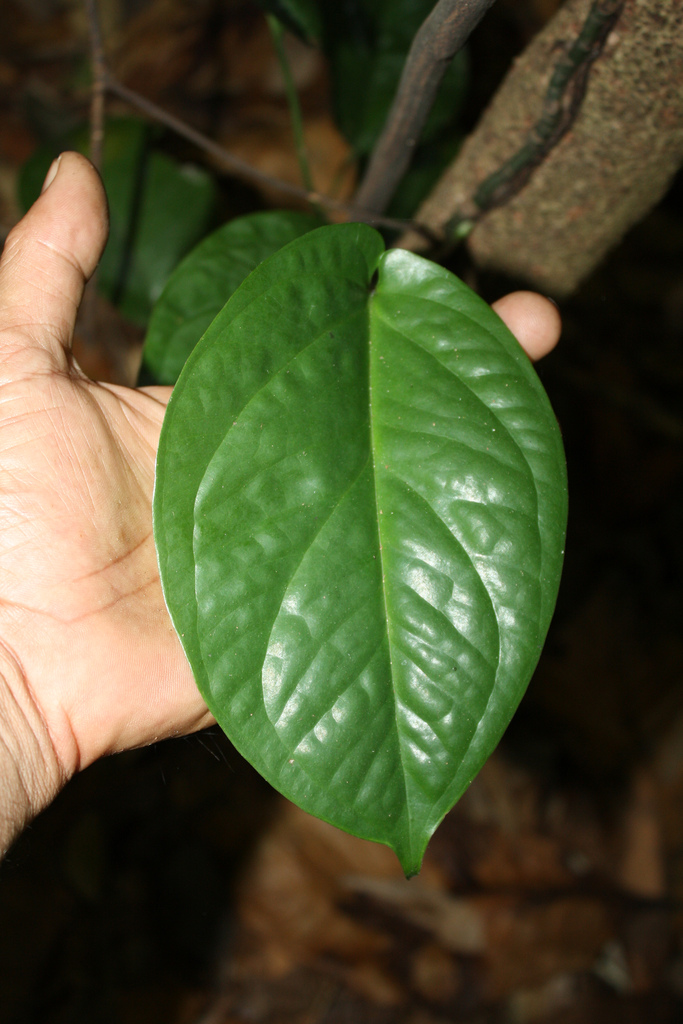
- Amydrium medium

Scientific classification
- Kingdom: Plantae
- Clade: Tracheophytes
- Clade: Angiosperms
- Clade: Monocots
- Order: Alismatales
- Family: Araceae
- Subfamily: Monsteroideae
- Tribe: Monstereae
- Genus: Amydrium; Schott

Synonyms
- Epipremnopsis Engl.

= Amydrium =

Genus of flowering plants

Amydrium is a genus of primarily epiphytic, climbing plants in the arum and aroid family Araceae, that is native to Southeast Asia, South China and New Guinea.

Amydrium is distinguished from other members of the tribe Monstereae by having two ovules in each ovary. The seeds tend to be heart shaped. Similar to other aroid genera, the leaves of Amydrium often have perforated leaves.

- Amydrium hainanense (H.Li, Y.Shiao & S.L.Tseng) H.Li - Guangdong, Guangxi, Hainan, Hunan, Yunnan and Vietnam.
- Amydrium humile Schott - Peninsular Malaysia and Sumatra.
- Amydrium medium (Zoll. & Moritzi) Nicolson - Borneo, Java, Maluku, Myanmar, Peninsular Malaysia, Philippines, Sumatra and Thailand.
- Amydrium sinense (Engl.) H.Li - Guangxi, Guizhou, Hubei, Hunan, Sichuan, Yunnan, and Vietnam.
- Amydrium zippelianum (Schott) Nicolson - Maluku, New Guinea, Philippines and Sulawesi.
