= Amydrium zippelianum =

Scientific classification
- Kingdom: Plantae
- Clade: Tracheophytes
- Clade: Angiosperms
- Clade: Monocots
- Order: Alismatales
- Family: Araceae
- Genus: Amydrium
- Species: A. zippelianum

Binomial name
- Amydrium zippelianum (Schott) Nicolson

Synonyms
- Synonymy: Amydrium magnificum (Engl.) Nicolson; Epipremnopsis magnifica (Engl.) Alderw.; Epipremnopsis zippeliana (Schott) Alderw.; Epipremnum asperatum Engl.; Epipremnum elmerianum Engl.; Epipremnum luzonense K.Krause; Epipremnum magnificum Engl.; Epipremnum mampuanum Alderw.; Epipremnum miniatum Elmer; Epipremnum philippinense Engl. & K.Krause; Epipremnum sorsogonense Elmer ex Merr., pro syn.; Epipremnum zippelianum (Schott) Engl.; Pothos miniatus Zipp. ex Schott, nom. illeg. homonym. post.; Rhaphidophora warburgii Engl.; Rhaphidophora zippeliana Schott

Species of plant

Amydrium zippelianum is a flowering plant in genus Amydrium of the arum family, Araceae. Its pattern is distinctive and it is sometimes cultivated as an ornamental plant. It is a climber native to central and eastern Malesia and New Guinea.

== Distribution ==
It is native to the Philippines, Sulawesi, Halmahera, Talaud Islands, and New Guinea (Irian Jaya and Papua New Guinea).

== Habitat ==
Primary lowland to lower montane rainforest, occasionally in regrowth or as a weed in plantations.

== Medical uses ==
Its leaves can be used as traditional medicine for sore ribs.
