= Amydrium humile =

Scientific classification
- Kingdom: Plantae
- Clade: Tracheophytes
- Clade: Angiosperms
- Clade: Monocots
- Order: Alismatales
- Family: Araceae
- Genus: Amydrium
- Species: A. humile

Binomial name
- Amydrium humile Schott

Species of plant

Amydrium humile is a flowering plant in genus Amydrium of the arum family Araceae.

== Distribution ==
The native range is Peninsula Malaysia to Sumatra.
