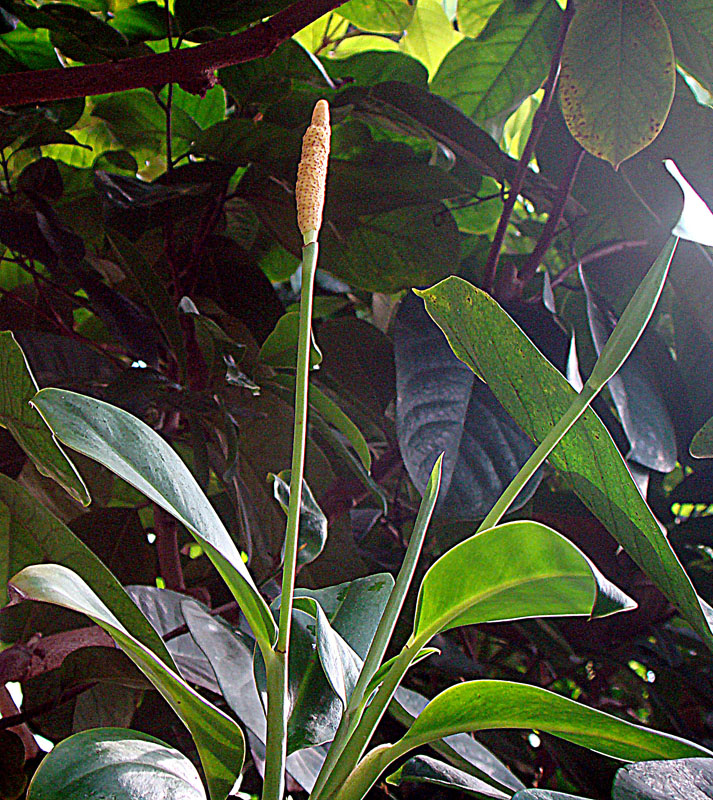

Scientific classification
- Kingdom: Plantae
- Clade: Tracheophytes
- Clade: Angiosperms
- Clade: Monocots
- Order: Alismatales
- Family: Araceae
- Genus: Stenospermation
- Species: S. ulei

Binomial name
- Stenospermation ulei K.Krause

= Stenospermation ulei =

Species of plant

Stenospermation ulei is a species of epiphitic plant in the family Araceae. It is indigenous to North Brazil, Guyana, and Venezuela.

== Description ==
The plant's stem height is about 2 m (6 ft 7 in), while its leaf blade length is 1.3 to 1.5 cm (0.51 to 0.59 in). Additionally it grows primarily in the wet tropical biome.
