= Heteropsis spruceana =

Scientific classification
- Kingdom: Plantae
- Clade: Tracheophytes
- Clade: Angiosperms
- Clade: Monocots
- Order: Alismatales
- Family: Araceae
- Genus: Heteropsis
- Species: H. spruceana

Binomial name
- Heteropsis spruceana Schott

Species of plant

Heteropsis spruceana is an epiphytic herb of the rainforests of northern South America. It belongs to the Calla Lily Family (Araceae). According to Dr. Michael Madison, its aerial roots are as strong as the nylon cordage used in parachutes.

It is endemic to Brazil, Colombia, Ecuador, French Guiana, Guyana and Venezuela.
