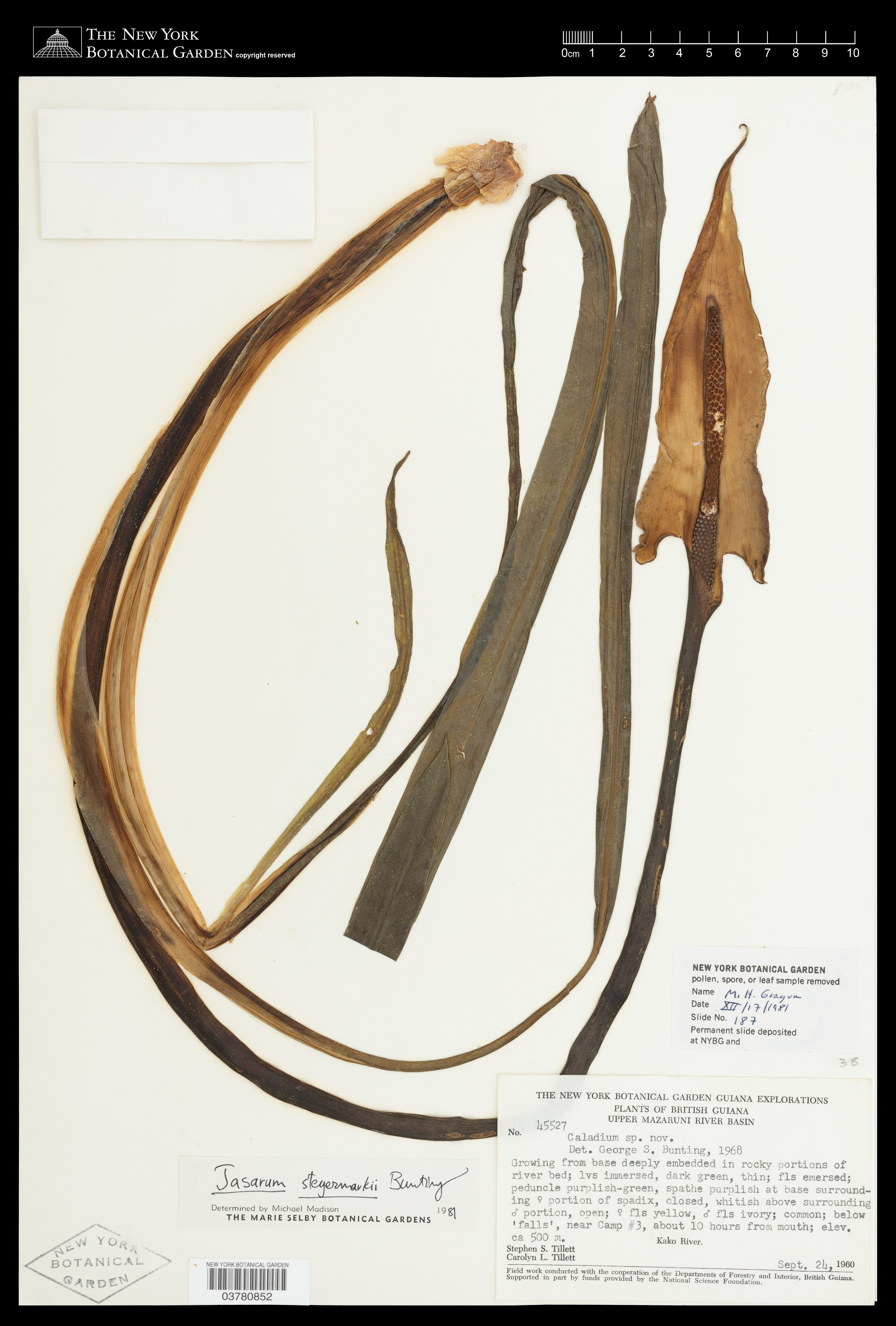

Scientific classification
- Kingdom: Plantae
- Clade: Tracheophytes
- Clade: Angiosperms
- Clade: Monocots
- Order: Alismatales
- Family: Araceae
- Subfamily: Aroideae
- Tribe: Caladieae
- Genus: Jasarum; G.S.Bunting
- Species: J. steyermarkii

Binomial name
- Jasarum steyermarkii G.S.Bunting

= Jasarum =

Genus of flowering plants

Jasarum is a monotypic genus of flowering plants in the family Araceae. The single species that makes up the genus is Jasarum steyermarkii. It was discovered in 1960, but wasn't described until 1977 due to classification difficulties with regards to understanding this species. Jasarum is now believed to be closely related to Caladium and it may have evolved from Caladiums that once grew in seasonal swamps. Jasarum steyermarkii is an aquatic species that is native to two river systems in Venezuela and Guyana. It is found growing in acidic blackwater and is unique in that it is the only submerged aquatic species in Araceae endemic to South America. Jasarum steyermarkii has thin ribbon-like leaves that can grow to lengths as long as 30 cm. Running down the length of the leaf is a clear midrib that has veins moving at right angles to the edge of the leaf. The spathes produced open above the surface of the water and are about 15 cm long.
