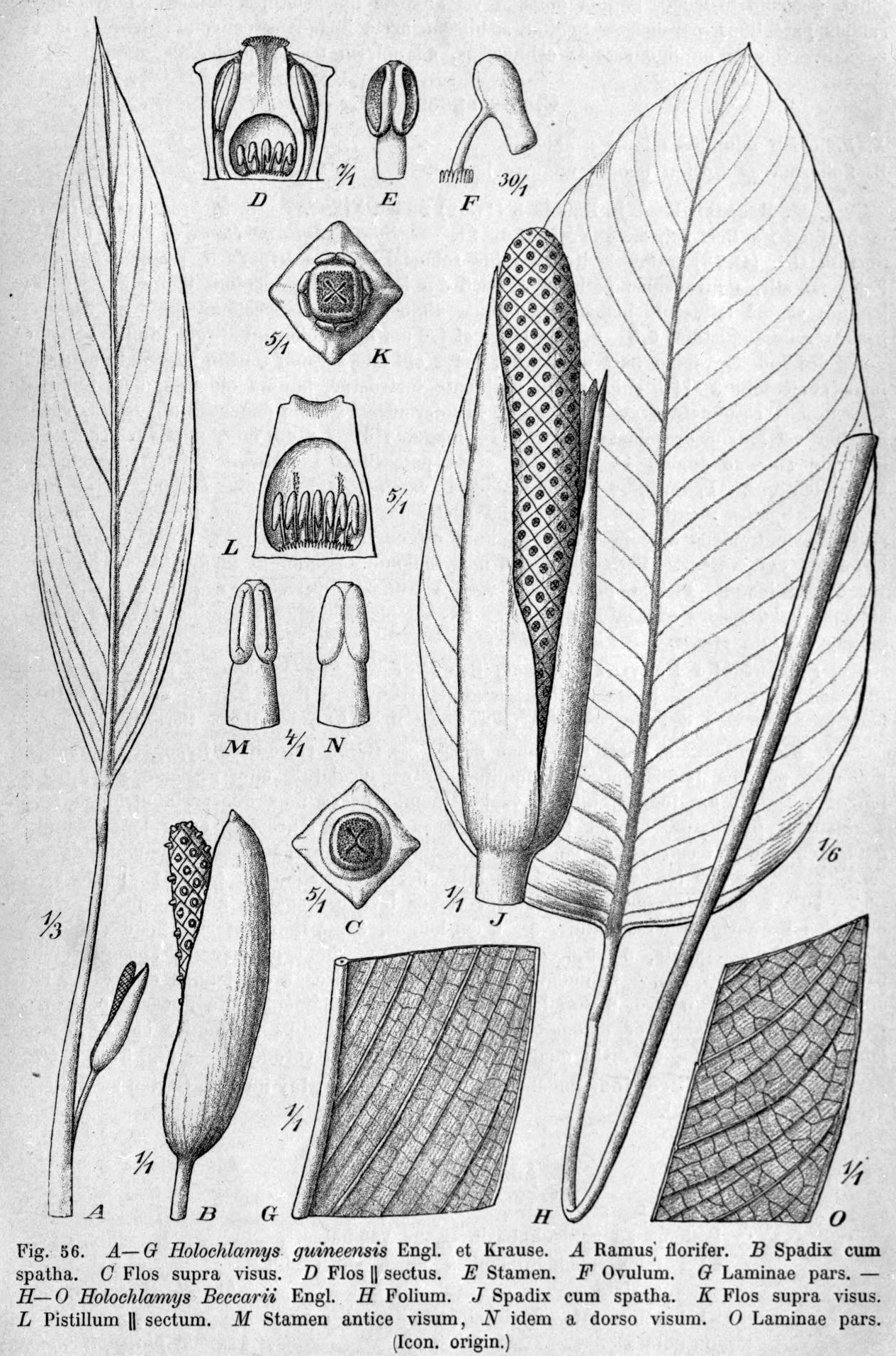
- Holochlamys beccarii 1908 illustration

Scientific classification
- Kingdom: Plantae
- Clade: Tracheophytes
- Clade: Angiosperms
- Clade: Monocots
- Order: Alismatales
- Family: Araceae
- Subfamily: Monsteroideae
- Tribe: Spathiphylleae
- Genus: Holochlamys; Engl.
- Species: H. beccarii

Binomial name
- Holochlamys beccarii (Engl.) Engl.

Synonyms
- Spathiphyllum beccarii Engl.; Holochlamys guineensis Engl. & K.Krause; Holochlamys elliptica Alderw.; Holochlamys ornata Alderw.; Holochlamys montana Gilli

= Holochlamys =

Genus of flowering plants

Holochlamys is a monotypic genus of flowering plants in the family Araceae. Holochlamys beccarii is the only species in the genus Holochlamys. It is native to New Guinea and the Bismarck Archipelago and is found growing in mud near lowland streams or rocky streambeds at high elevations.

The species is primarily rheophytic and closely related to the genus Spathiphyllum. Holochlamys closely resemble Spathiphyllum except that in Holochamys the spathe clasps the spadix. Also, the inflorescence rots quickly after flowering which doesn't occur in Spathiphyllum. The inflorescence emerges below the foliage and has a white spathe and spadix. The spadix tends to be about the same length as the spathe and produces a leathery fruit. Contained within the fruit are very small seeds. The leaves can vary greatly in size, but they tend to be either oval or lanceolate.
