= Stenospermation arborescens =

Conservation status
- Endangered (IUCN 3.1)

Scientific classification
- Kingdom: Plantae
- Clade: Tracheophytes
- Clade: Angiosperms
- Clade: Monocots
- Order: Alismatales
- Family: Araceae
- Genus: Stenospermation
- Species: S. arborescens

Binomial name
- Stenospermation arborescens Madison

Species of flowering plant

Stenospermation arborescens is a species of plant in the family Araceae. It is endemic to Ecuador. Its natural habitat is subtropical or tropical moist montane forests. It is threatened by habitat loss.
