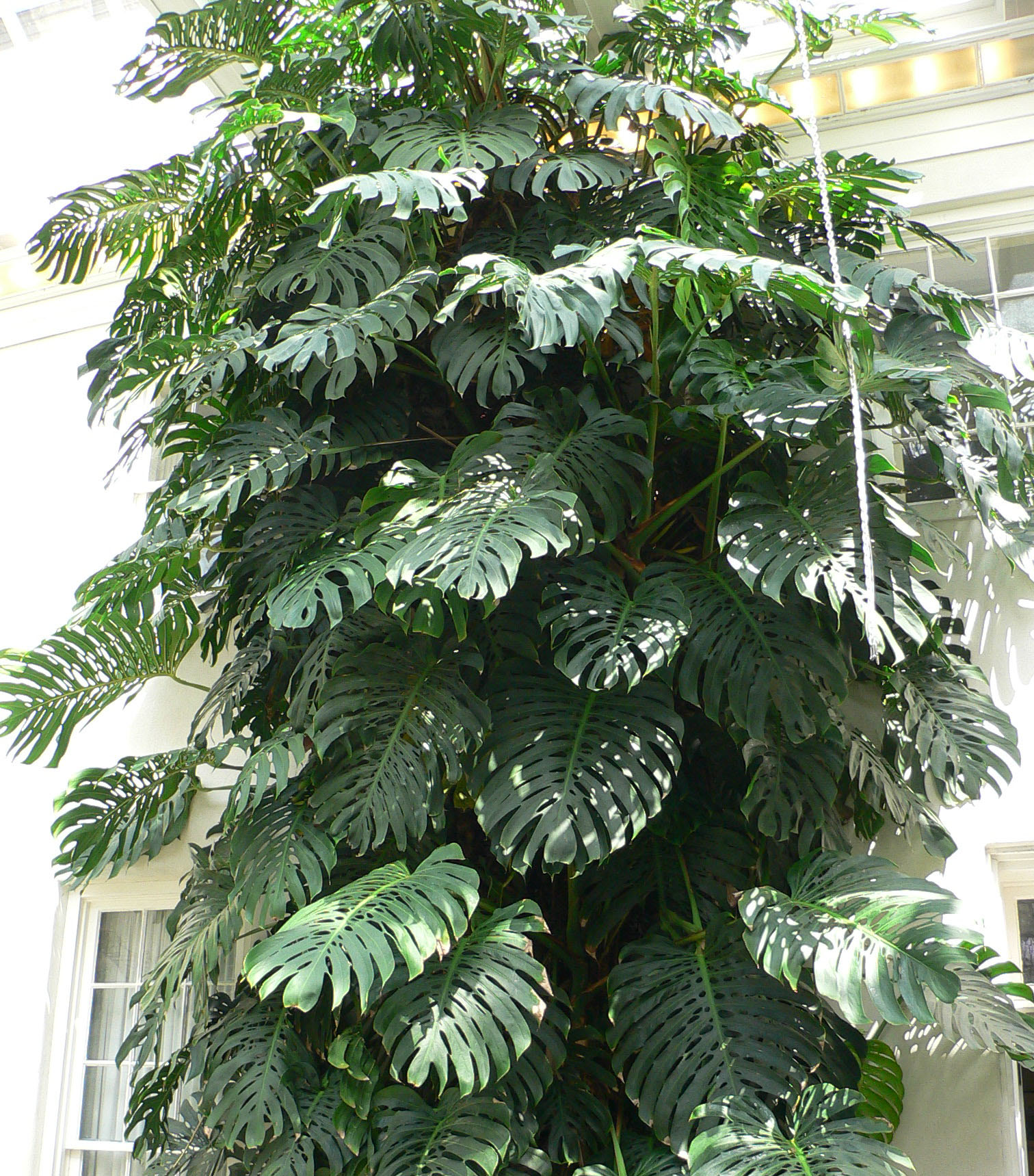
- Monstera deliciosa

Scientific classification
- Kingdom: Plantae
- Clade: Tracheophytes
- Clade: Angiosperms
- Clade: Monocots
- Order: Alismatales
- Family: Araceae
- Subfamily: Monsteroideae

= Monsteroideae =

Subfamily of flowering plants

Monsteroideae is a subfamily of flowering plants in the family Araceae.

This subfamily is notable for having many trichosclereids in the vegetative and floral parts of the plants, but rarely in the roots.

== Tribes and genera ==
=== Monotypic tribes ===
- Anadendreae: genus Anadendrum - SE Asia
- Heteropsideae: genus Heteropsis - S America

=== Monstereae ===
- Alloschemone - Amazon region (Bolivia, Brazil)
- Amydrium - SE Asia
- Epipremnum - Himalayas, SE Asia to Australia
- Monstera – tropical Americas and common houseplants
- Rhaphidophora - tropical Africa, Asia to W. Pacific.
- Rhodospatha – tropical Americas
- Scindapsus - SE Asia, New Guinea, Queensland, W Pacific Islands
- Stenospermation - central and South America

=== Spathiphylleae ===
- Holochlamys - New Guinea, Bismarck Archipelago
- Spathiphyllum - tropical Americas, SE Asia including the Philippines and east of the Wallace line
