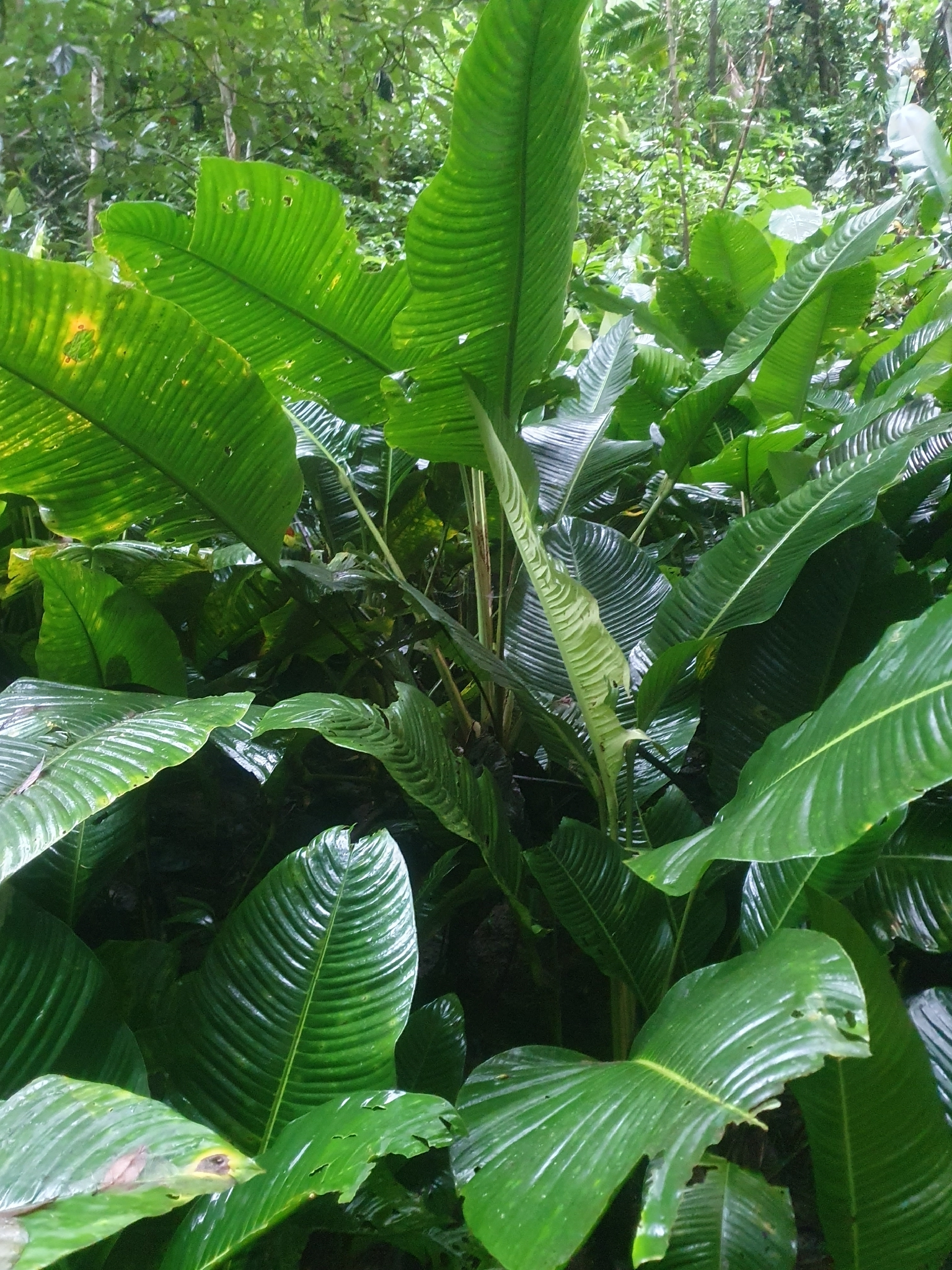
- Rhodospatha moritziana

Scientific classification
- Kingdom: Plantae
- Clade: Tracheophytes
- Clade: Angiosperms
- Clade: Monocots
- Order: Alismatales
- Family: Araceae
- Subfamily: Monsteroideae
- Tribe: Monstereae
- Genus: Rhodospatha; Poepp.

Synonyms
- Anepsias Schott; Atimeta Schott

= Rhodospatha =

Genus of plants

Rhodospatha is a genus of plants in family Araceae. It is native to South America, Central America, and southern Mexico.

== Species ==
- Rhodospatha acosta-solisii Croat - Peru
- Rhodospatha arborescens Temponi & Croat - Minas Gerais
- Rhodospatha badilloi G.S.Bunting - Venezuela
- Rhodospatha bolivarana G.S.Bunting - Bolívar State of southeastern Venezuela
- Rhodospatha boliviensis Engl. & K.Krause - Bolivia
- Rhodospatha brachypoda G.S.Bunting - Venezuela, Peru, Ecuador, Bolivia, the Guianas
- Rhodospatha brent-berlinii Croat - Peru
- Rhodospatha cardonae G.S.Bunting - Amazonas State of southern Venezuela
- Rhodospatha densinervia Engl. - Colombia, Ecuador
- Rhodospatha dissidens Sodiro - Ecuador
- Rhodospatha falconensis G.S.Bunting - Falcón State of northwestern Venezuela
- Rhodospatha forgetii N.E.Br. - Costa Rica
- Rhodospatha guasareensis G.S.Bunting - Colombia, Zulia State of northwestern Venezuela
- Rhodospatha herrerae Croat & P.Huang - Colombia
- Rhodospatha katipas Croat - Peru
- Rhodospatha kraenzlinii Sodiro - Ecuador
- Rhodospatha latifolia Poepp. - Brazil, Bolivia, Peru, Ecuador, Colombia, Venezuela, Guyana, French Guiana
- Rhodospatha monsalveae Croat & D.C.Bay - Valle del Cauca in Colombia
- Rhodospatha moritziana Schott - Costa Rica, Panama, Peru, Ecuador, Colombia, Venezuela
- Rhodospatha mukuntakia Croat - Bolivia, Peru, Ecuador, Colombia
- Rhodospatha oblongata Poepp. - Brazil, Peru, Colombia, Venezuela, the Guianas
- Rhodospatha pellucida Croat & Grayum - Costa Rica, Panama, Nicaragua, Ecuador, Colombia
- Rhodospatha perezii G.S.Bunting - northwestern Venezuela
- Rhodospatha piushaduka Croat - Peru
- Rhodospatha robusta Sodiro - Ecuador
- Rhodospatha statutii Sodiro - Ecuador
- Rhodospatha steyermarkii G.S.Bunting - Sucre State of northeastern Venezuela
- Rhodospatha venosa Gleason - northwestern Brazil, Peru, Colombia, Venezuela, the Guianas
- Rhodospatha wendlandii Schott - Tabasco, Central America, Peru, Colombia, Venezuela
