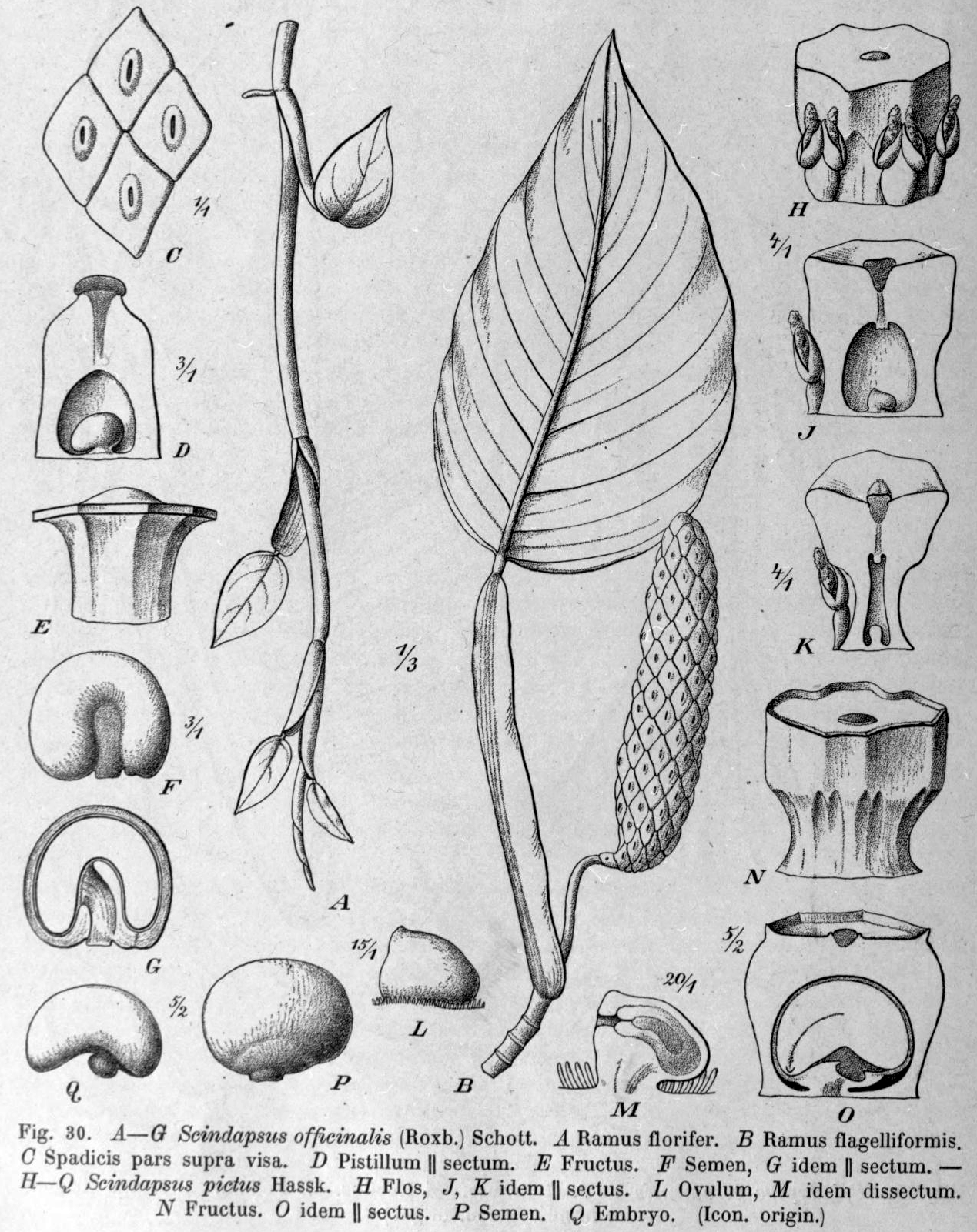

Scientific classification
- Kingdom: Plantae
- Clade: Tracheophytes
- Clade: Angiosperms
- Clade: Monocots
- Order: Alismatales
- Family: Araceae
- Genus: Scindapsus
- Species: S. officinalis

Binomial name
- Scindapsus officinalis (Roxb.) Schott

Synonyms
- Monstera officinalis (Roxb.) Schott; Pothos officinalis Roxb.; Scindapsus annamicus Gagnep.

= Scindapsus officinalis =

Species of flowering plant

Scindapsus officinalis is a species of flowering plants in the Araceae family. The species is native to the Indian subcontinent and Indo-China. The plant has local names such as pipul, gajpipul, and tiakathal.

== Description ==
The species is a large climbing liana with a thick stem and broad, dark green leaves. It is an epiphyte on trees and rocks. It is native to tropical forests of India, Myanmar, China, and Nepal.

== Uses ==
The fruit is used medicinally as a stimulant and treatment for rheumatism. Fruits are cultivated in India and is an important ingredient in Ayurveda.
