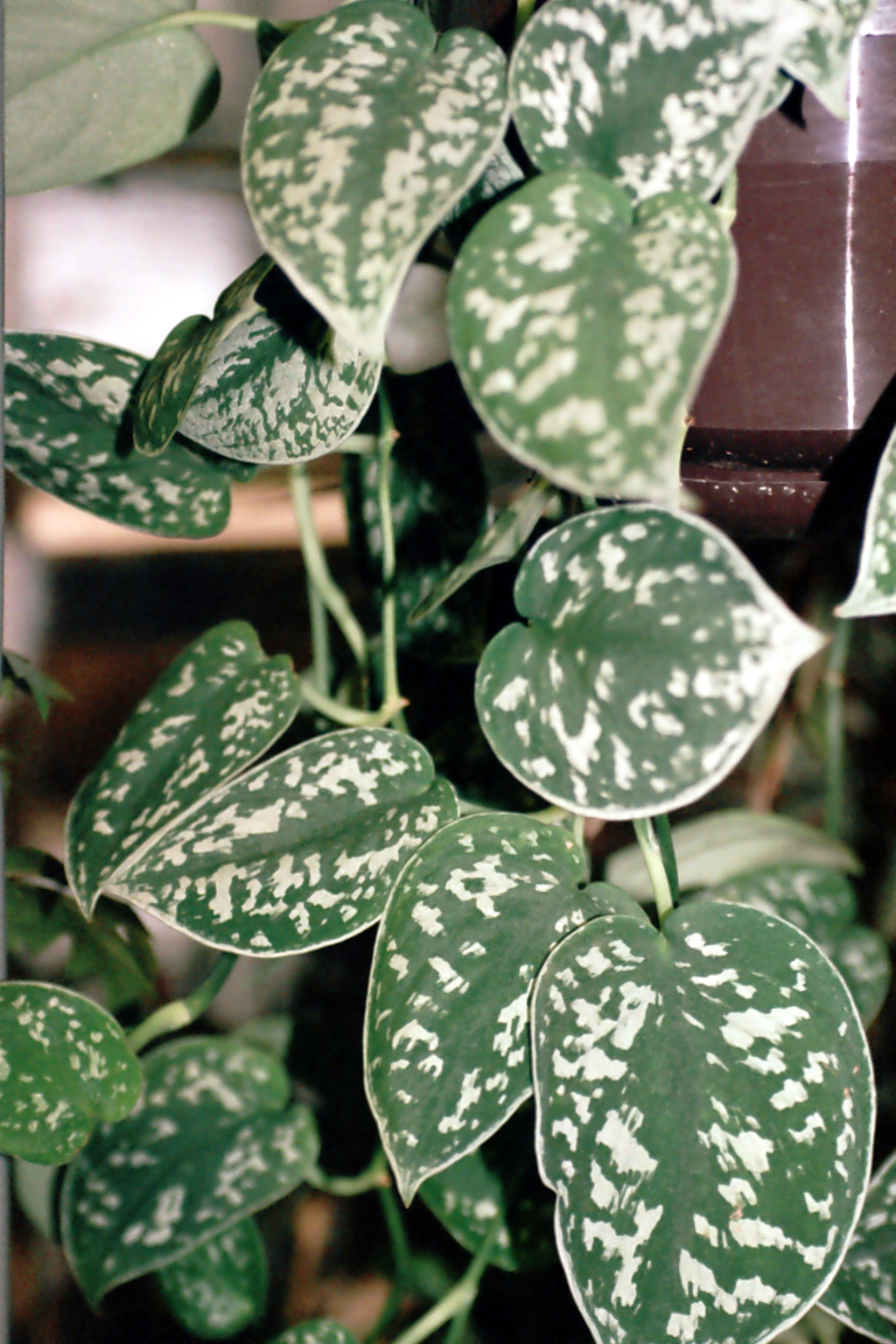
- Scindapsus pictus.
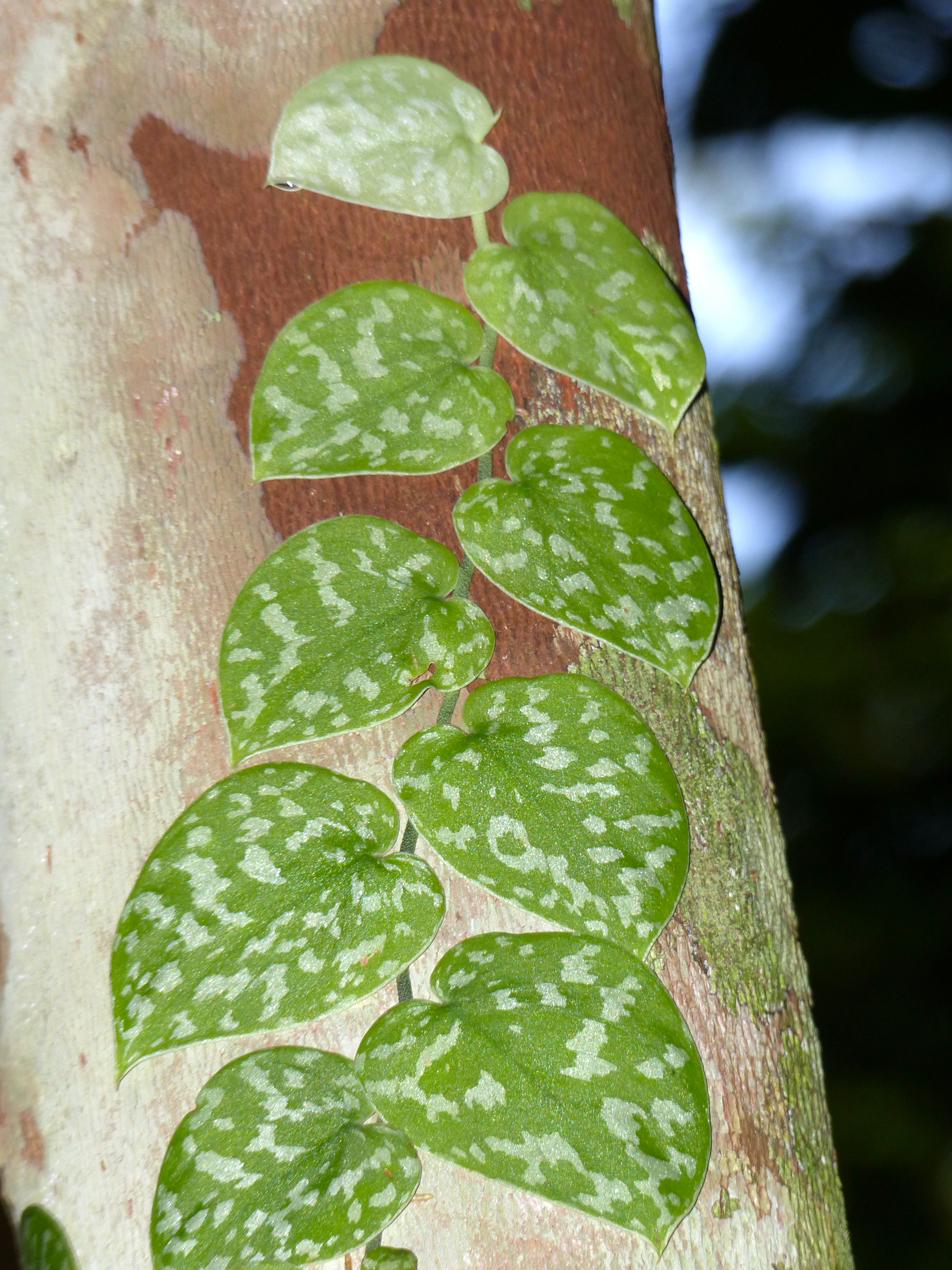
- Example of "shingling" growth habit

Scientific classification
- Kingdom: Plantae
- Clade: Tracheophytes
- Clade: Angiosperms
- Clade: Monocots
- Order: Alismatales
- Family: Araceae
- Genus: Scindapsus
- Species: S. pictus

Binomial name
- Scindapsus pictus Hassk.

Synonyms
- argenteus W.Bull; argyraea J.J.Veitch; argyraeus Engl. nom. inval.; Scindapsus argyraeus (J.J.Veitch) Engl.; Scindapsus Schott nom. illeg.

= Scindapsus pictus =

Species of flowering plant

Scindapsus pictus, commonly called satin pothos, silver pothos, or silver vine, is a species of flowering plant in the aroid or arum family, Araceae, native to Bangladesh, Borneo, India, Java, Peninsular Malaysia, the Philippines, Sulawesi, Sumatra, Taiwan and Thailand. The Latin specific epithet pictus means "painted", referring to the variegation on the leaves.

== Growth characteristics ==
Capable of growing to around 3 m (10 ft) tall, S. pictus is an evergreen climber (liana), growing upwards and out from roots and ending in the newest leaf. Along the underside of the vine (which is the plant's stem) are nodes, generally appearing every few centimeters, which produce anchoring roots that enable the plant to grow taller and find more light. The roots are sticky to the touch and will adhere to any firm surface, including rocks, cement, brick, logs and trees. Adjacent to each root node is usually a leaf node, sprouting from the opposite (top) side of the vine. Unlike other related genera, the leaves are a matte, seafoam-pine green hue, often covered in silver blotches of variegation. Similar to other aroid genera (such as Epipremnum or Syngonium), the insignificant flowers of S. pictus are rarely seen in cultivation, as vegetative reproduction (i.e., taking cuttings or root division) is the most common method of propagation.

With a minimum outdoor temperature requirement of 15 °C (59 °F), this plant is widely cultivated as a houseplant in temperate regions around the world, and outdoors in appropriate climes. It typically grows, somewhat slowly, to around 90 cm (35 in). However, if provided with an adequate support structure, such as the side of a building or a wall, or a tree or a wide pole, S. pictus vines often grow faster and higher towards sunlight, with the leaves eventually "shingling" (growing in a flattened position) against the support, in an effort to achieve maximum photosynthetic benefit beneath the forest canopy.

== Varieties ==
Several hybrids, varietals and cultivars of Scindapsus pictus have been developed, each one differentiated by varying amounts of silvery-gray markings, set against a backdrop of teal to pastel-green foliage.

- 'Argyraeus': The most commonly sold cultivar, 'Argyraeus' features smallish, pine-green leaves with minimal silver spotting. It has gained the Royal Horticultural Society's Award of Garden Merit.
- 'Exotica': Possibly the second-most popular variety, 'Exotica' features leaves that, if given proper support or climbing opportunity, may grow to be plate-sized. In addition to being the largest-leaved form, 'Exotica' is distinguished by have silvery foliage covered in teal and greenish blotches.
- 'Silvery Ann': Similar pine-teal foliage to the aforementioned 'Argyraeus', but with much more pronounced silver/gray-tipped leaves and leaf edges. Typically, over half of each individual leaf will be white or silver in color, with the outer fin of each the same white color.
- 'Silver Lady': With slightly larger leaves than 'Silvery Ann', 'Silver Lady' has almost a reverse color scheme, with green spotting against a primarily silver-gray background.
- 'Silver Satin': similar leaf shape as 'Argyraeus' or 'Silvery Ann' but with the majority of the foliage being a bright, silvery-white.
- 'Silver Splash': somewhat larger foliage, more akin to the 'Exotica', featuring a similar color scheme, albeit more "green" markings ser against a silvery backdrop. Each leaf has a pronounced dark green vertical midsection.
- 'Jade Satin': Sometimes (incorrectly) called 'Jade Pothos' by some sources, this variety features semi-matte, pastel green leaves with virtually no variegation or markings. Under certain lighting, the leaves may appear subtly shiny. The all-green variety is sometimes called 'Jade Satin Green Form'; a yellow-marbled variegate form, 'Jade Satin Aurea', exists, as well as a white-marbled variegate, 'Jade Satin Marble'.
