= George Sydney Bunting =

American botanist (1927-2015)

- Born: 1927
- Died: 2015 (aged 87–88)
- Scientific career
- Author abbrev. (botany): G.S.Bunting

George Sydney Bunting (1927-2015) was an American botanist best known for his work describing the flora of Venezuela, Mexico, and aroids in particular. Throughout his career he scientifically described at least 195 new species, including the monotypic genus Jasarum and many species of Anthurium, Philodendron, and Spathiphyllum, a revision of which was the subject of his PhD thesis. Some of his early work described plants in cultivation, and later work collecting and describing species in habitat was done through the Missouri Botanical Garden, the Bailey Hortorium at Cornell University, and at Jardin Botanico de Maracaibo.

== Select publications ==
- 1951 A classification and description of some commercial foliage plants Michigan State College of Agriculture. 492 pp.
- 1958 A revision of the genus Spathiphyllum (Araceae). Columbia University. 316 pp.
- 1960 A revision of Spathiphyllum (Araceae) New York Botanical Garden. ISBN 0893270377
- 1979 Sinopsis de las Araceae de Venezuela A comprehensive Spanish-language review of Venezuelan aroids

== Taxa named in his honor ==
- (Aristolochiaceae) Aristolochia buntingii Pfeifer
- (Asclepiadaceae) Ditassa buntingii (Morillo) Liede
- (Fabaceae) Albizia buntingii Barneby & J.W.Grimes
- (Fabaceae) Swartzia buntingii R.S.Cowan
- (Malpighiaceae) Hiraea buntingii W.R.Anderson
- (Rubiaceae) Psychotria buntingii Steyerm.
