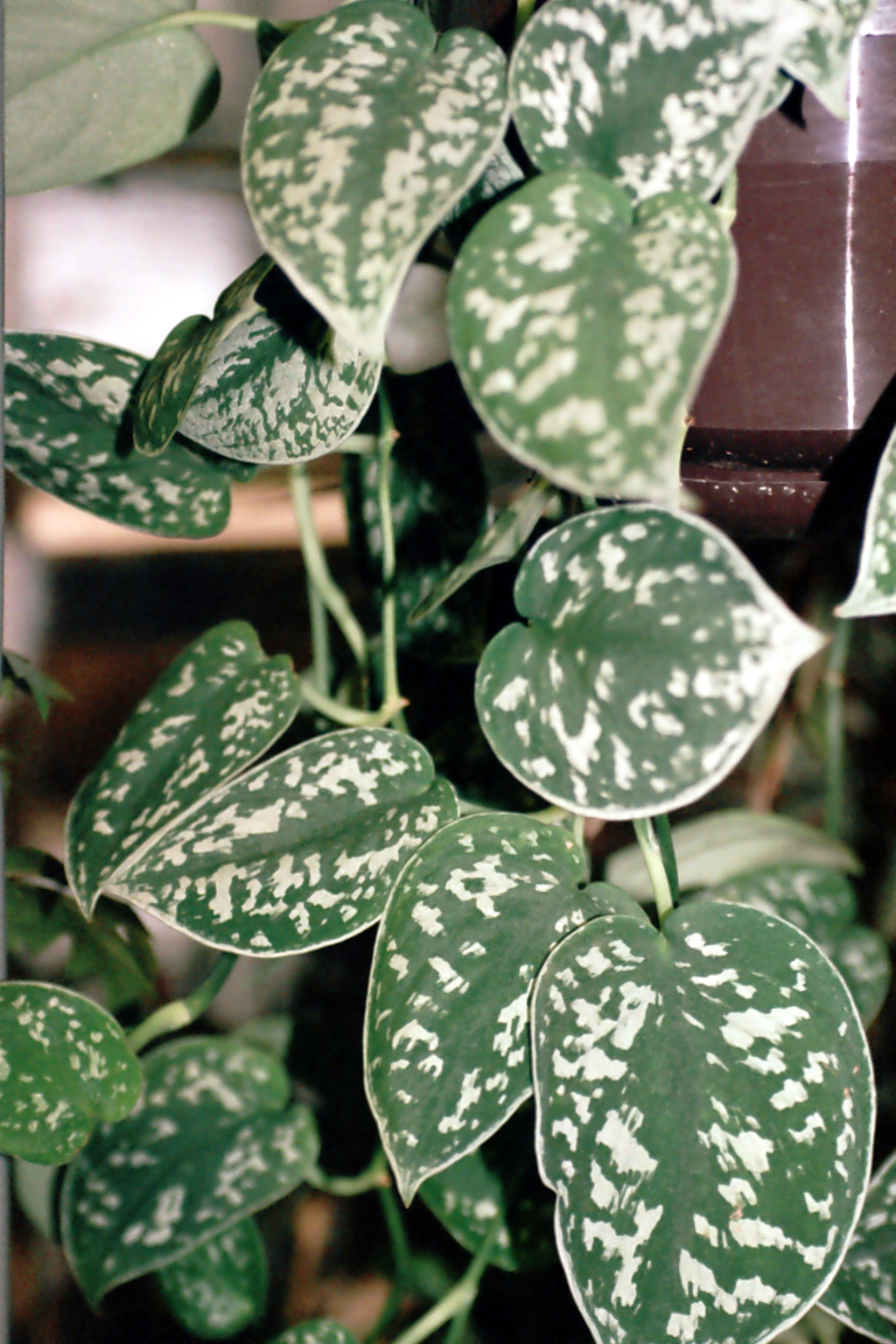
- Scindapsus pictus var. argyreus

Scientific classification
- Kingdom: Plantae
- Clade: Tracheophytes
- Clade: Angiosperms
- Clade: Monocots
- Order: Alismatales
- Family: Araceae
- Subfamily: Monsteroideae
- Tribe: Monstereae
- Genus: Scindapsus; Schott

Synonyms
- Cuscuaria Schott

= Scindapsus =

Genus of flowering plants

Scindapsus is a genus of flowering plants in the family Araceae. It is native to Southeast Asia, New Guinea, Queensland, and a few western Pacific islands. The species Scindapsus pictus is common in cultivation.

Scindapsus is not easily distinguishable from Epipremnum. The main difference between the two genera is in the number of seeds they produce. Scindapsus species have one ovule in each ovary whereas Epipremnum species have a few. The seeds of Scindapsus are rounded to slightly kidney-shaped. The plants are primarily root climbing vines.

== History of the name ==
Claudius Aelianus (Aelian, 2-3 cc., De Natura Animalium XII.44-46, XVII.18), uses the word in relation to an Indian musical instrument used for taming the wild elephants.

== Species ==
- Scindapsus alpinus Alderw. - Sumatra
- Scindapsus altissimus Alderw. - Queensland, New Guinea, Solomon Islands
- Scindapsus beccarii Engl. - Sumatra, Borneo, Peninsular Malaysia
- Scindapsus carolinensis Hosok. - Chuuk Islands in Micronesia
- Scindapsus coriaceus Engl. - Borneo
- Scindapsus crassipes Engl. - Borneo
- Scindapsus curranii Engl. & K.Krause - Sabah, Philippines
- Scindapsus cuscuaria (Aubl.) C.Presl - Nicobar Islands, Philippines, Maluku, Java
- Scindapsus cuscuarioides Engl. & K.Krause - New Guinea
- Scindapsus falcifolius Engl. - Sulawesi
- Scindapsus geniculatus Engl. - Sarawak
- Scindapsus glaucescens (Engl. & K.Krause) Alderw. - Borneo
- Scindapsus grandifolius Engl. - described 1898 from material cultivated at botanical garden in Bogor; probably now extinct
- Scindapsus hederaceus Miq. - Indochina, Borneo, Java, Sumatra, Philippines
- Scindapsus javanicus Alderw. - Java
- Scindapsus latifolius M.Hotta - Borneo
- Scindapsus longipes Engl. - Brunei, Sarawak
- Scindapsus longistipitatus Merr. - Borneo
- Scindapsus lucens Bogner & P.C.Boyce - Sumatra, Peninsular Malaysia
- Scindapsus maclurei (Merr.) Merr. & F.P.Metcalf - Hainan, Vietnam, Laos, Thailand
- Scindapsus mamilliferus Alderw. - Borneo
- Scindapsus marantifolius Miq. - Java
- Scindapsus officinalis (Roxb.) Schott - India, Bangladesh, Bhutan, Assam, Nepal, Andaman Islands, Myanmar, Thailand, Laos, Cambodia, Vietnam
- Scindapsus perakensis Hook.f. - Bangladesh, Thailand, Peninsular Malaysia, Borneo, Java, Sumatra
- Scindapsus pictus Hassk. - Bangladesh, Thailand, Peninsular Malaysia, Borneo, Java, Sumatra, Sulawesi, Philippines
- Scindapsus roseus Alderw. - Sumatra
- Scindapsus rupestris Ridl. - Thailand, Peninsular Malaysia, Borneo, Sumatra
- Scindapsus salomoniensis Engl. & K.Krause - Solomon Islands
- Scindapsus schlechteri K.Krause - Papua New Guinea
- Scindapsus scortechinii Hook.f. - Bangladesh, Thailand, Peninsular Malaysia
- Scindapsus splendidus Alderw. - Sumatra
- Scindapsus subcordatus Engl. & K.Krause - Papua New Guinea
- Scindapsus suffruticosus Alderw. - Sumatra
- Scindapsus sumatranus (Schott) P.C.Boyce & A.Hay - Sumatra
- Scindapsus treubii Engl. - Peninsular Malaysia, Borneo, Java

=== Formerly classified ===
Scindapsus aureus - Now classified as Epipremnum aureum
