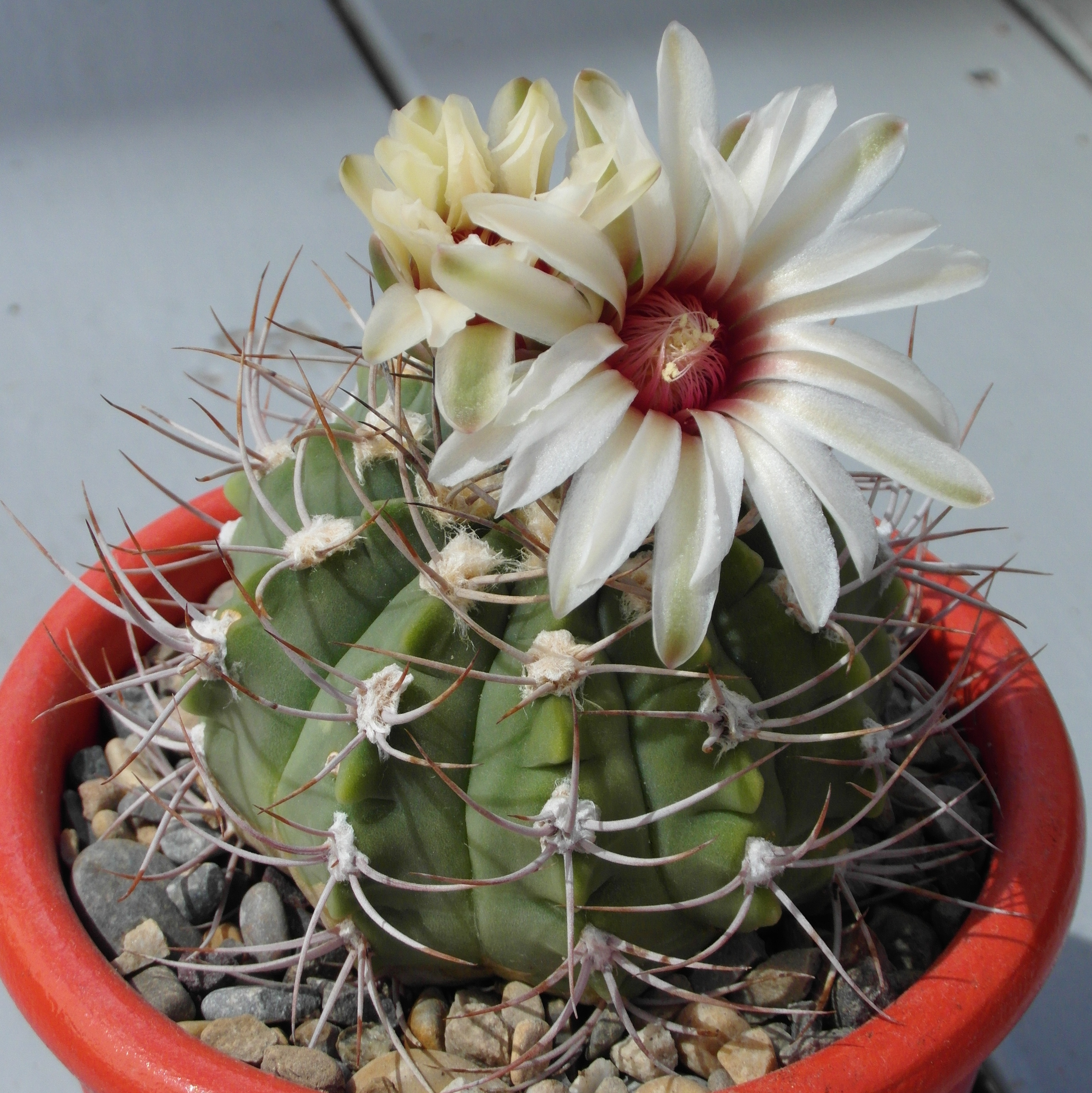

Conservation status
- Least Concern (IUCN 3.1)

Scientific classification
- Kingdom: Plantae
- Clade: Tracheophytes
- Clade: Angiosperms
- Clade: Eudicots
- Order: Caryophyllales
- Family: Cactaceae
- Subfamily: Cactoideae
- Genus: Gymnocalycium
- Species: G. nigriareolatum

Binomial name
- Gymnocalycium nigriareolatum Backeb. 1934

Synonyms
- Gymnocalycium catamarcense H.Till & W.Till 1995; Gymnocalycium catamarcense subsp. acinacispinum H.Till & W.Till i1995; Gymnocalycium catamarcense f. belense H.Till & W.Till 1995; Gymnocalycium catamarcense f. ensispinum H.Till & W.Till 1995; Gymnocalycium catamarcense f. montanum H.Till & W.Till 1995; Gymnocalycium catamarcense subsp. schmidianum H.Till & W.Till 1995; Gymnocalycium nigriareolatum f. carmineum H.Till 1998; Gymnocalycium nigriareolatum var. densispinum Backeb. ex H.Till 1998; Gymnocalycium nigriareolatum var. simoi H.Till 1998; Gymnocalycium pugionacanthum Backeb. ex H.Till 1987; Gymnocalycium pugionacanthum var. stejskalii Milt 2017; Gymnocalycium schmidianum (H.Till & W.Till) Mereg. & Kulhánek 2015

= Gymnocalycium nigriareolatum =

Species of cactus

Gymnocalycium nigriareolatum is a species of Gymnocalycium from Argentina.

== Description ==
Gymnocalycium nigriareolatum is a cactus that grows either as a solitary plant or in clusters. It has dull, light to dark gray-green, rounded stems that are 4–6 cm tall and 5–8 cm wide (occasionally up to 12 cm). The plant typically has 10 sharp-edged ribs with shallow, transverse notches. It lacks central spines but has about 7 slightly curved, light gray-brown radial spines with darker tips. These spines are 1–3 cm long, with the 3 lowest being the longest.

The flowers are funnel-shaped, either white with a pinkish throat or carmine red. They measure 4–4.6 cm in length and up to 4 cm in diameter. The spherical fruits are small, about 1–1.2 cm in diameter.

== Distribution ==
This species is native to the Sierra de Graciana and Cuesta de Los Angeles in the Catamarca province of Argentina, where it grows on rocky terrain at altitudes of 500 to 1500 meters.

== Taxonomy ==
It was first described in 1934 by Curt Backeberg.
