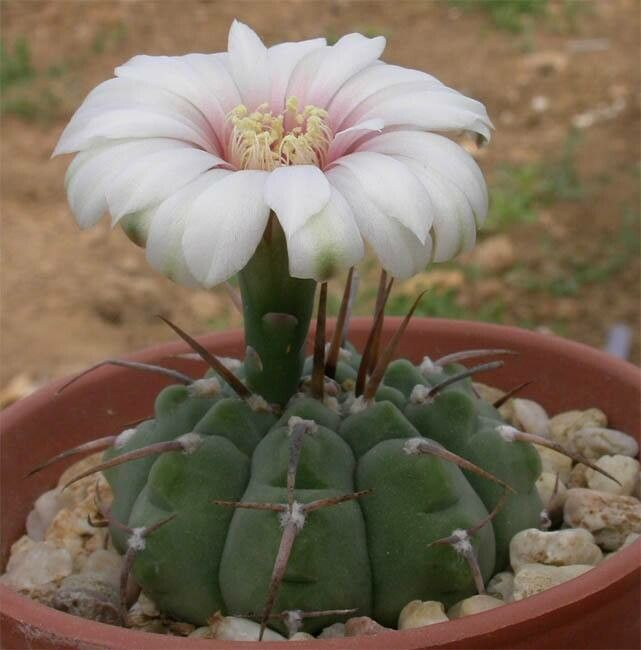

Conservation status
- Least Concern (IUCN 3.1)

Scientific classification
- Kingdom: Plantae
- Clade: Tracheophytes
- Clade: Angiosperms
- Clade: Eudicots
- Order: Caryophyllales
- Family: Cactaceae
- Subfamily: Cactoideae
- Genus: Gymnocalycium
- Species: G. ochoterenae

Binomial name
- Gymnocalycium ochoterenae Backeb. 1935

Synonyms
- Gymnocalycium bodenbenderianum subsp. intertextum (Backeb. ex H.Till) H.Till 1993; Gymnocalycium intertextum Backeb. ex H.Till 1987; Gymnocalycium ochoterenae var. altautinense Papsch 1993; Gymnocalycium ochoterenae var. cinereum Backeb. 1936; Gymnocalycium ochoterenae subsp. herbsthoferianum H.Till & Neuhuber 1992; Gymnocalycium ochoterenae var. polygonum Backeb. 1966; Gymnocalycium ochoterenae var. scoparium H.Till & Neuhuber 1992; Gymnocalycium ochoterenae var. tenuispinum Backeb. 1966; Gymnocalycium ochoterenae var. variispinum Backeb. 1966; Gymnocalycium ochoterenae subsp. vatteri (Buining) Papsch 1993; Gymnocalycium vatteri Buining 1950; Gymnocalycium vatteri var. altautinense (Papsch) V.Gapon 2006 publ. 2007

= Gymnocalycium ochoterenae =

Species of cactus

Gymnocalycium ochoterenae is a species of Gymnocalycium from Argentina.

== Description ==
Gymnocalycium ochoterenae grows individually with olive green to brownish, flattened spherical to hemispherical shoots and reaches heights of 3 to 4.5 centimeters with diameters of up to 8 centimeters. A stubby, branched taproot is formed. The 9 to 16 wide and flat ribs are rarely slightly humped. There is a central spine, which is often missing. The 3 to 5 (rarely 1 to 7) brownish-yellow to whitish-yellow marginal thorns that are curved back towards the plant body or radiate in a comb-like manner have a darker tip and are 1 to 1.5 centimeters (rarely up to 2.2 centimeters) long.

The funnel-shaped, white flowers have a light pink throat. They reach a length of 3.5 to 5.5 centimeters (rarely up to 6.5 centimeters) and have a diameter of 3.5 to 5.5 centimeters. The green to dull red fruits are barrel-shaped and 1.5 to 2 centimeters long.

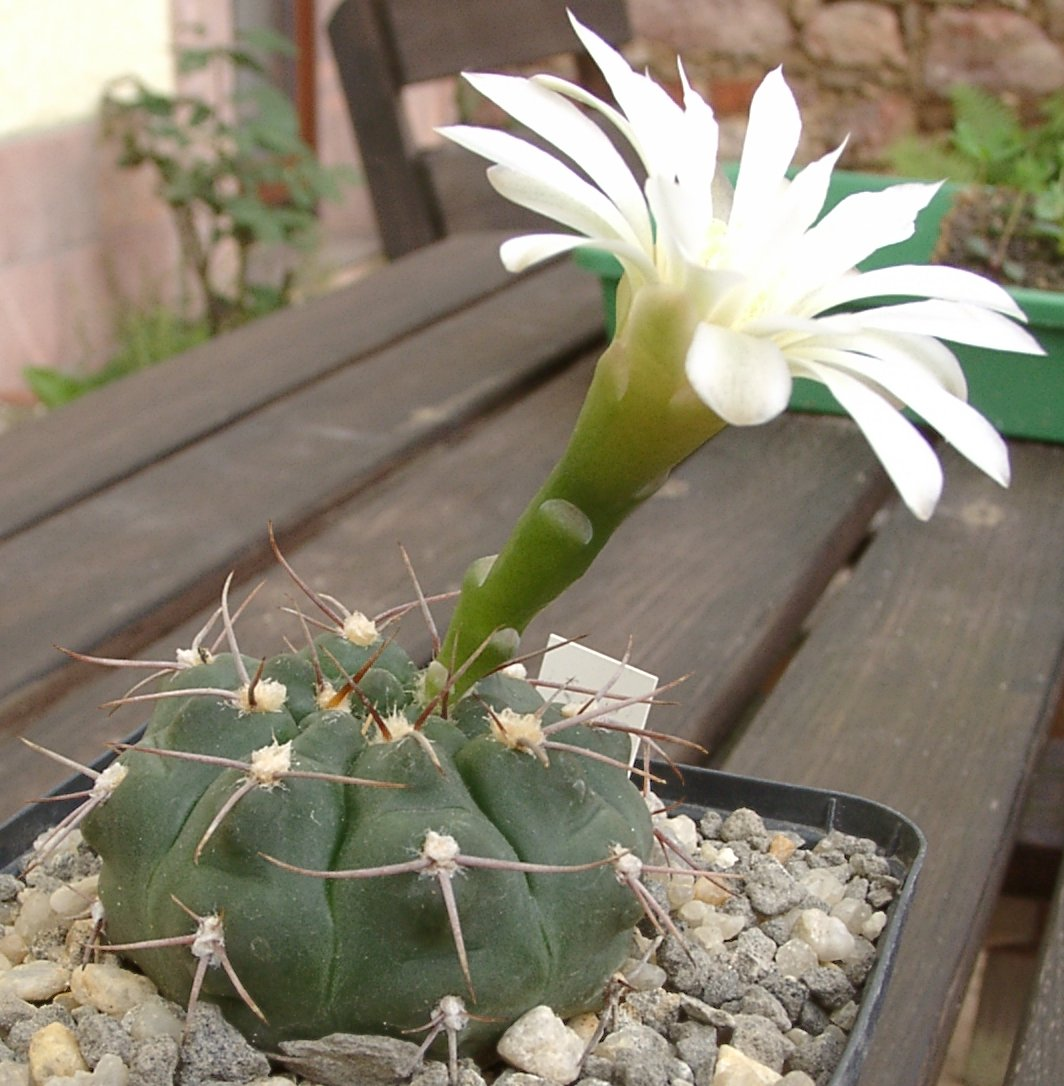

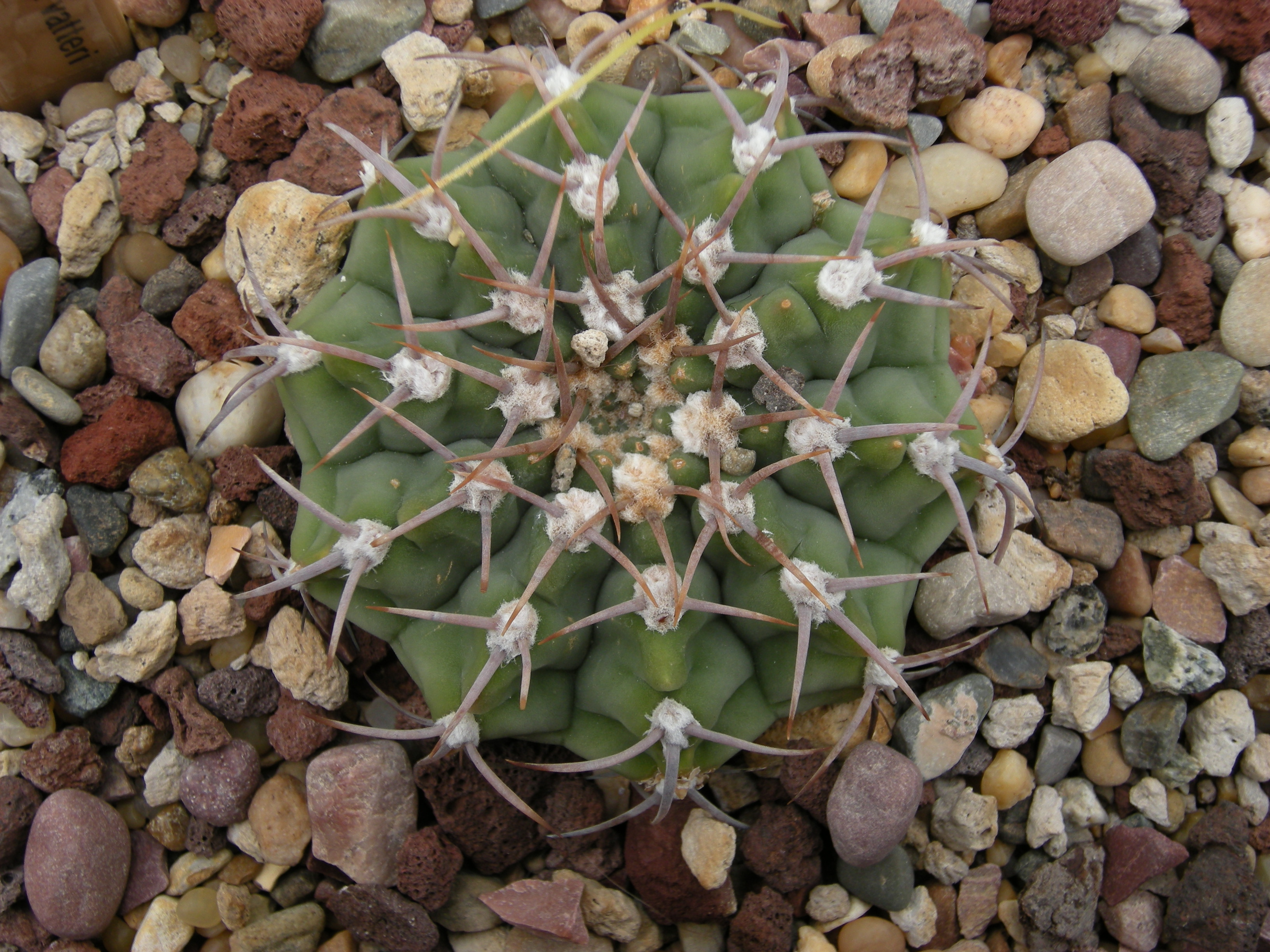

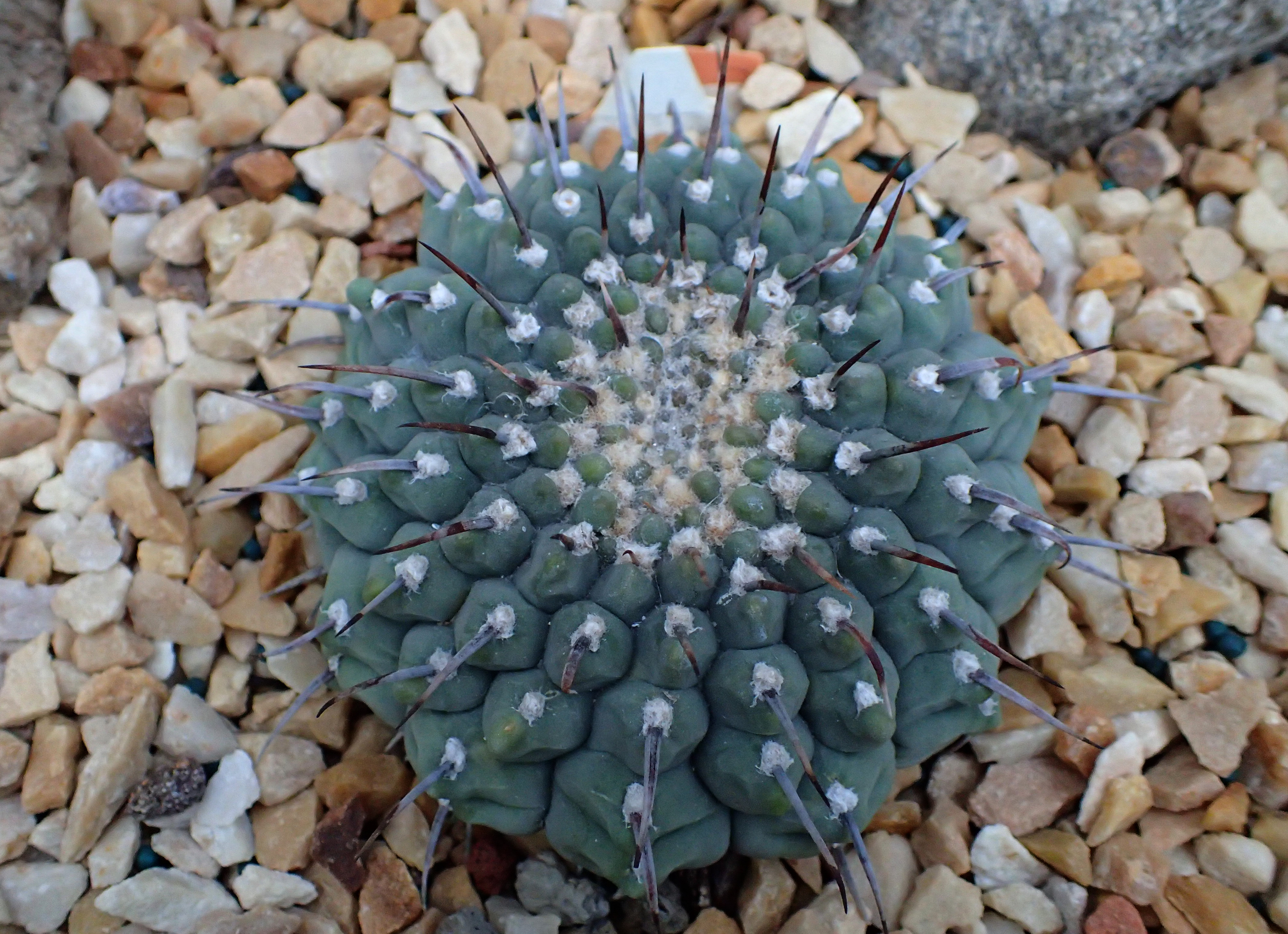

== Distribution ==
Gymnocalycium ochoterenae is widespread in the Argentine provinces of Córdoba and San Luis at altitudes of 500 to 1500 meters.

== Taxonomy ==
The first description was made in 1936 by Curt Backeberg. The specific epithet ochoterenae honors the Mexican botanist Isaac Ochoterena (1885–1950).
