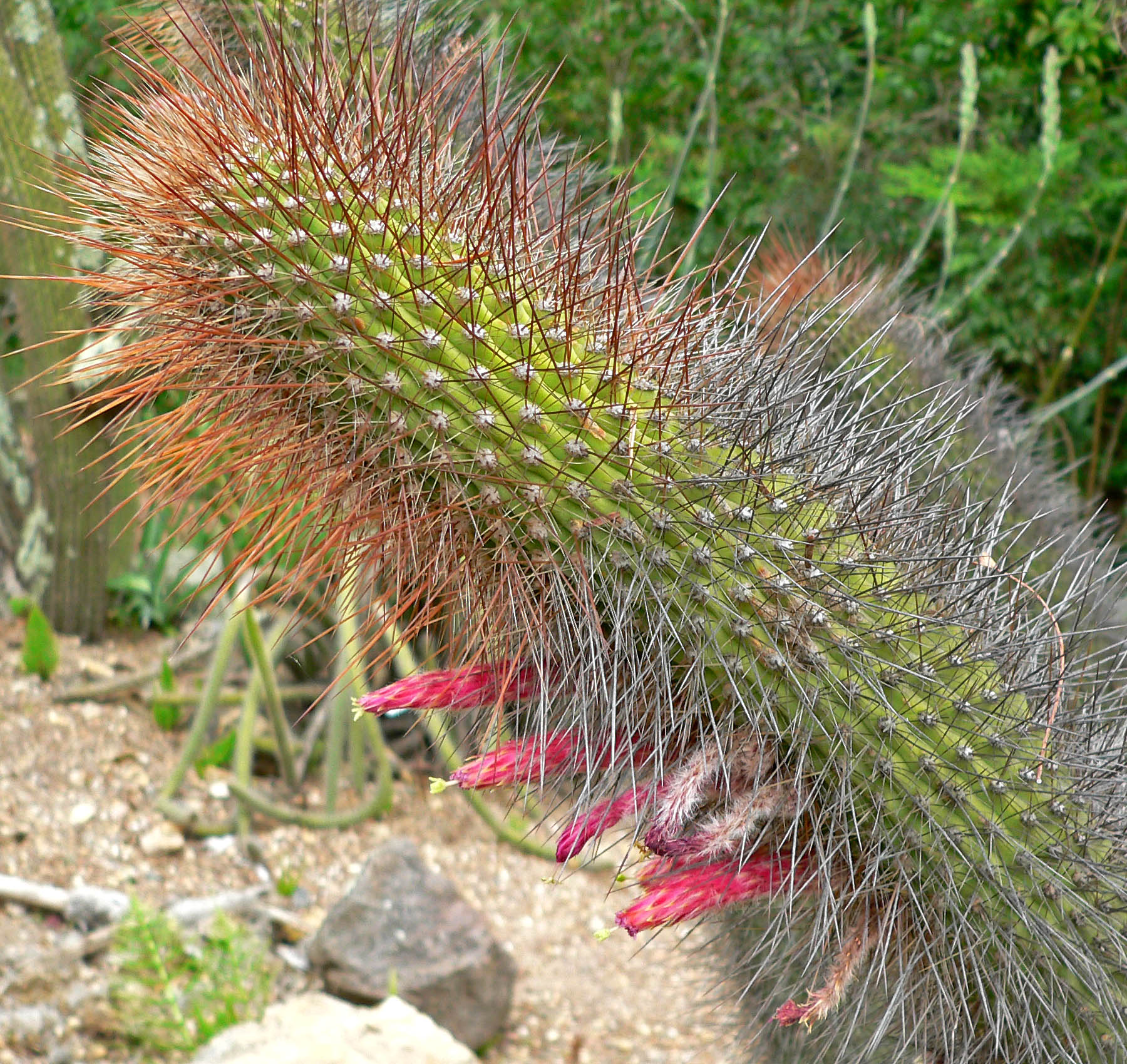

Conservation status
- Least Concern (IUCN 3.1)

Scientific classification
- Kingdom: Plantae
- Clade: Tracheophytes
- Clade: Angiosperms
- Clade: Eudicots
- Order: Caryophyllales
- Family: Cactaceae
- Subfamily: Cactoideae
- Genus: Cleistocactus
- Species: C. buchtienii

Binomial name
- Cleistocactus buchtienii Backeb.

Synonyms
- Echinopsis buchtienii (Backeb.) Anceschi & Magli 2013; Cleistocactus angosturensis Cárdenas 1956; Cleistocactus buchtienii var. flavispinus Cárdenas 1952; Cleistocactus reae Cárdenas 1957; Cleistocactus ressinianus Cárdenas 1956; Cleistocactus sucrensis Cárdenas 1952; Cleistocactus tupizensis var. sucrensis (Cárdenas) Backeb. 1959

= Cleistocactus buchtienii =

Species of cactus

Cleistocactus buchtienii is a species of columnar cacti in the genus Cleistocactus.

== Description ==
Cleistocactus buchtienii grows as a shrub with branched, rigid shoots at the base and reaches heights of growth of up to 1.5 meters (rarely up to 3 meters) with a diameter of up to 5 cm (2.0 in). There are about 16 to 19 (rarely up to 22) low ribs present, which are conspicuously notched. The needle-like, reddish-brown to straw-yellow spines are difficult to distinguish between central and radial spines. The 4 central spines are spread out and up to 3.5 cm (1.4 in) long. The radial spines, which are 8 to 15 to 2 cm (5.91 to 0.79 in) long, are slender and spread out.

The wine-red to bluish pink flowers are 5 to 8 cm (2.0 to 3.1 in) long and 9 mm (0.35 in) wide. The tips of the bracts are burgundy or greenish to dark green. The flowers are straight or very slightly curved, pointing slightly upwards, and are covered with short, dense hairs arising from the scale axils. The stamens do not protrude or hardly protrude, the style protrudes slightly to clearly from the flower. The spherical fruits tearing open at the base reach a diameter of 2 to 3 cm (0.79 to 1.18 in). They are yellowish green at the base and light purple above. Seeds are black and 1.2 mm (0.047 in).

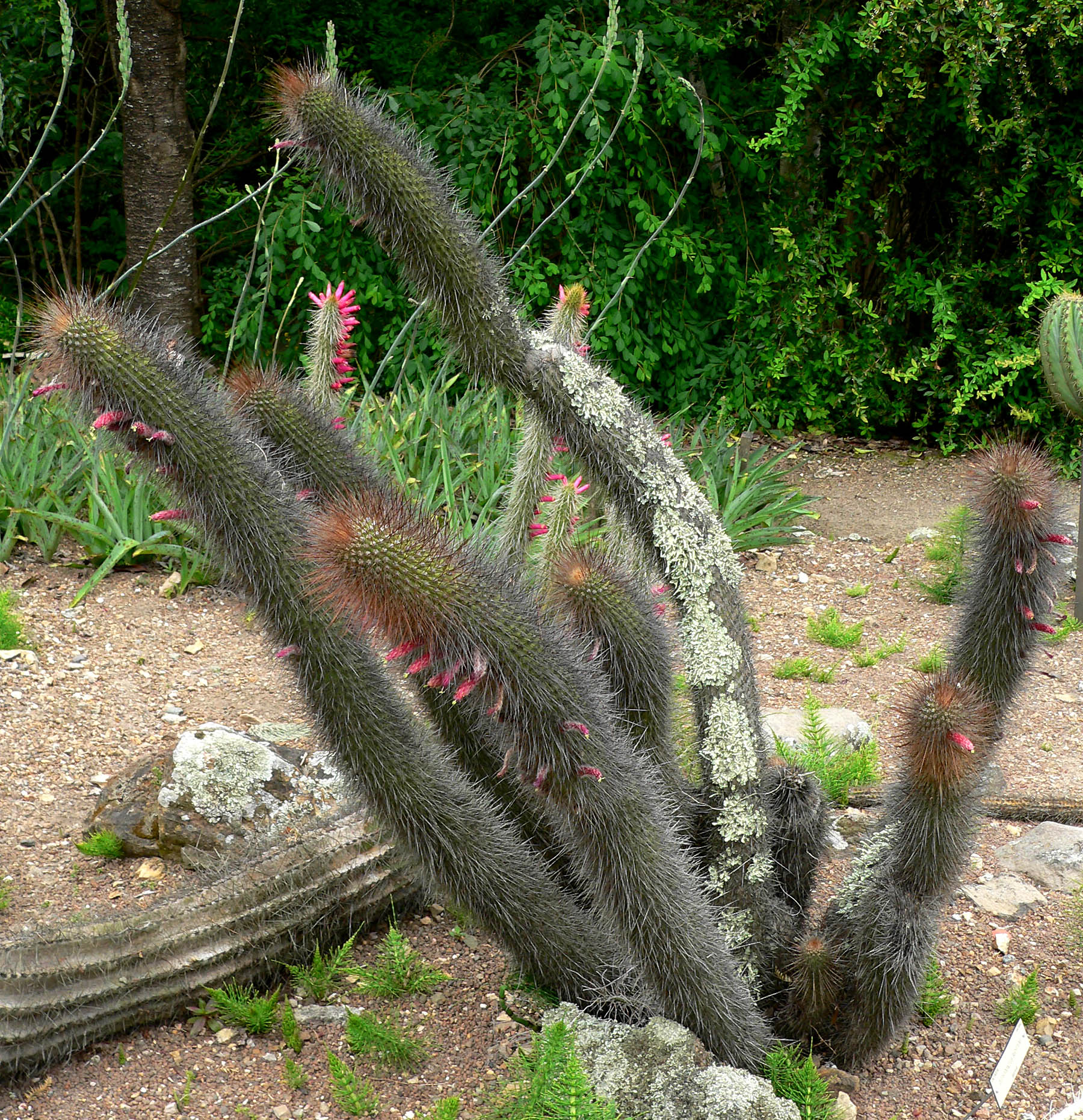
Plant

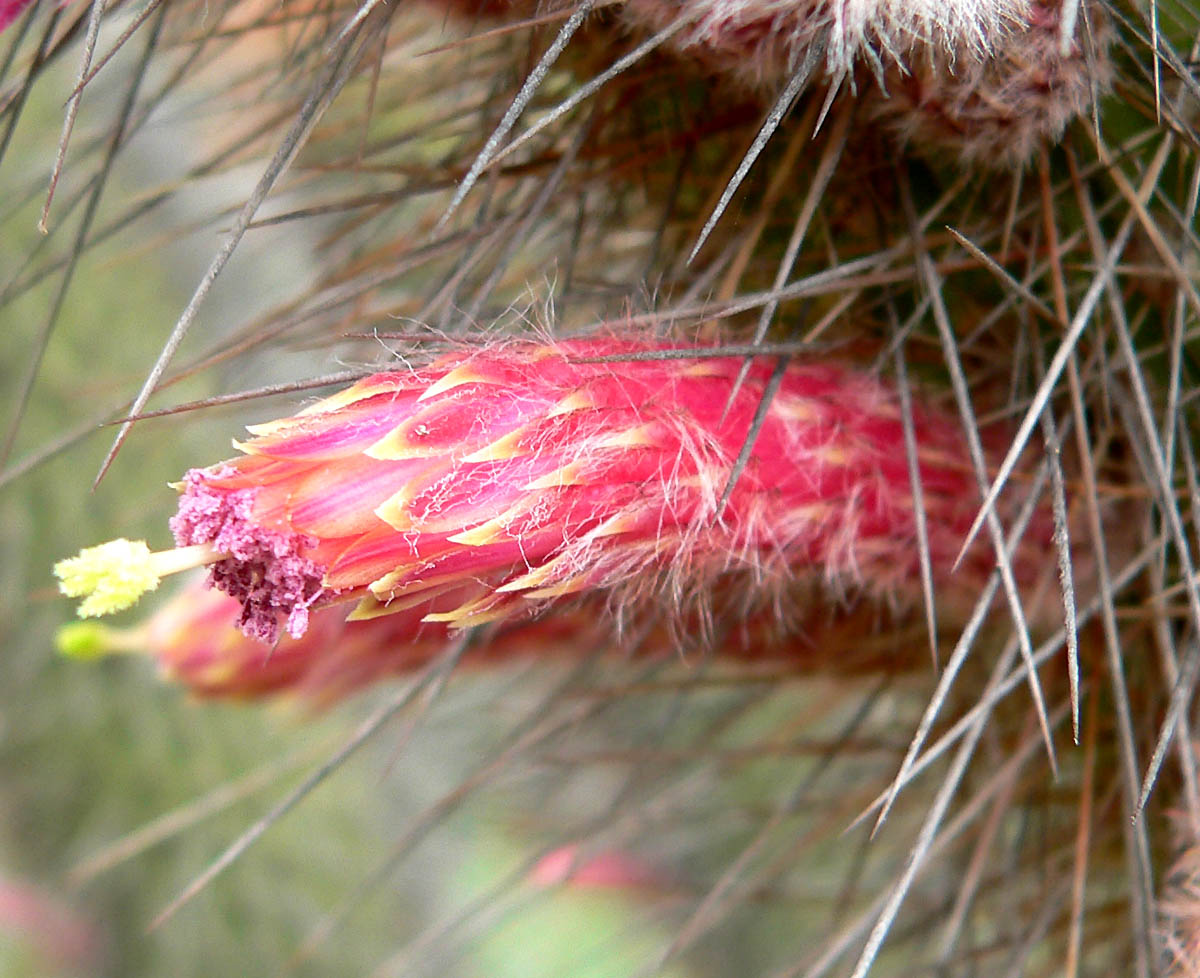
Flower

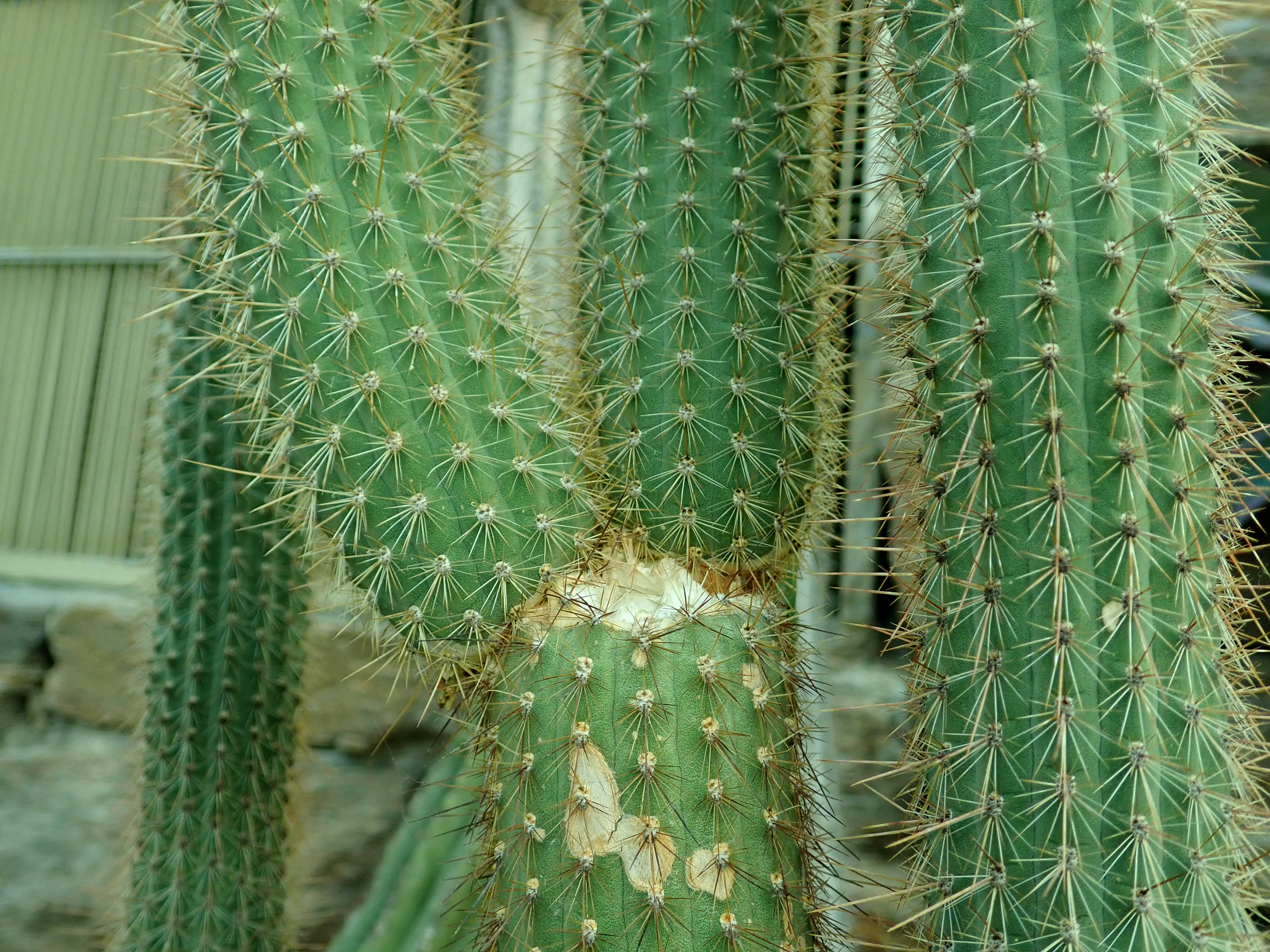
Spines

== Distribution ==
Cleistocactus buchtienii is found growing on wooded slopes and plains in the dry forest of the Bolivian departments of Cochabamba, Chuquisaca and Santa Cruz at altitudes of 2500 to 2750 meters (rarely up to 3100 meters).

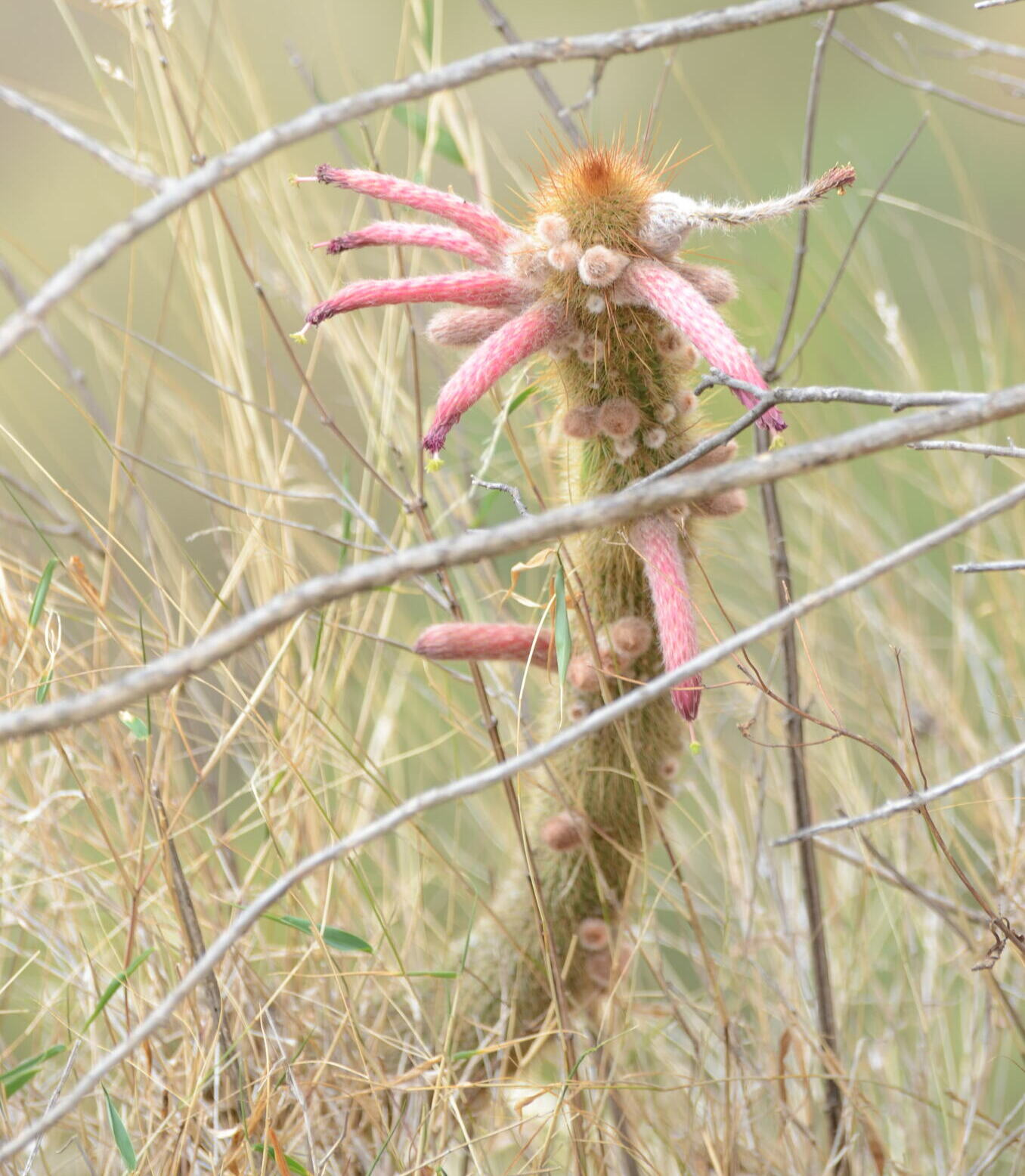
Plant blooming in habitat in Sehuenca, Bolivia

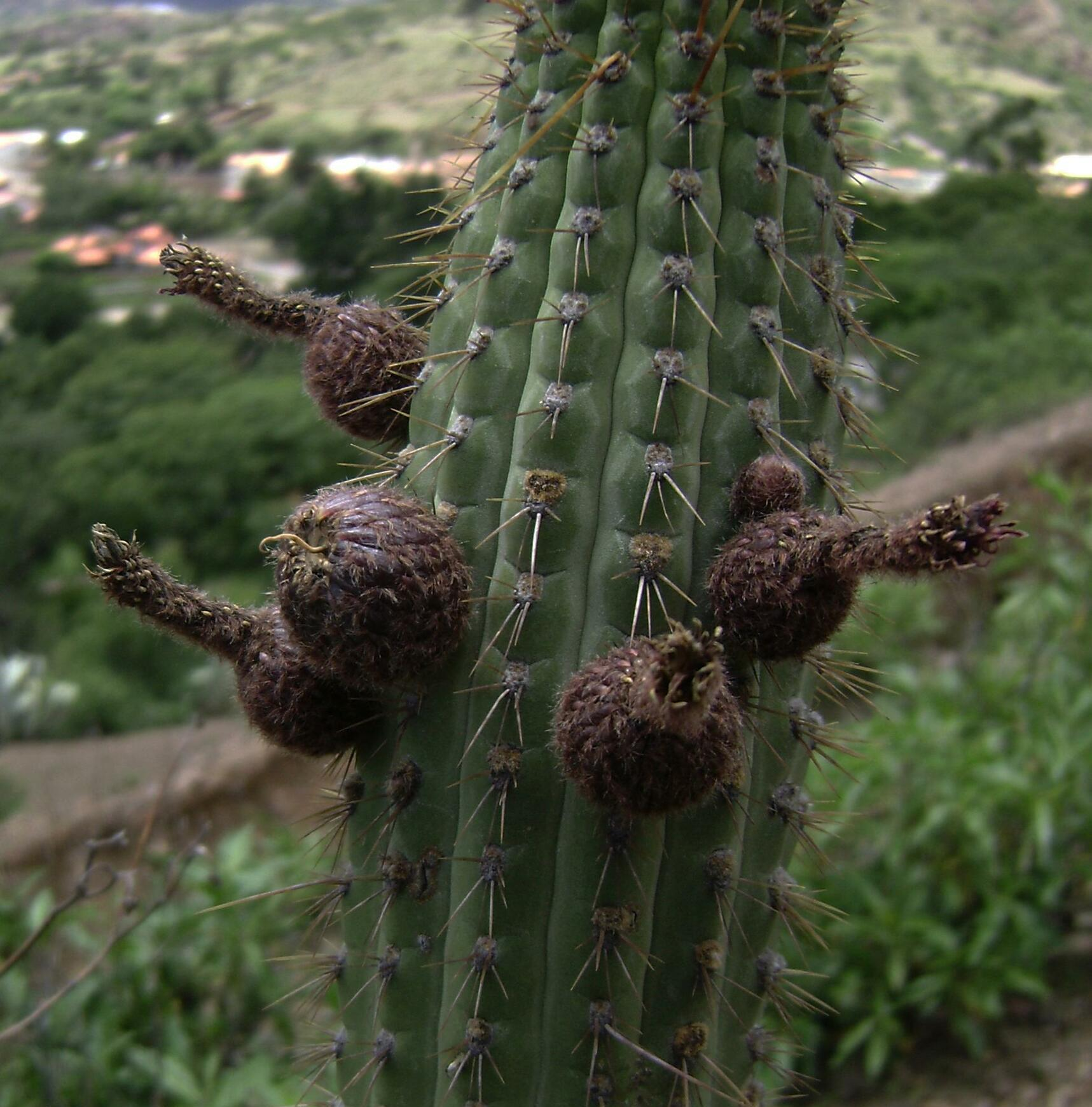
Plant fruiting in habitat in Villa de Yotala, Bolivia

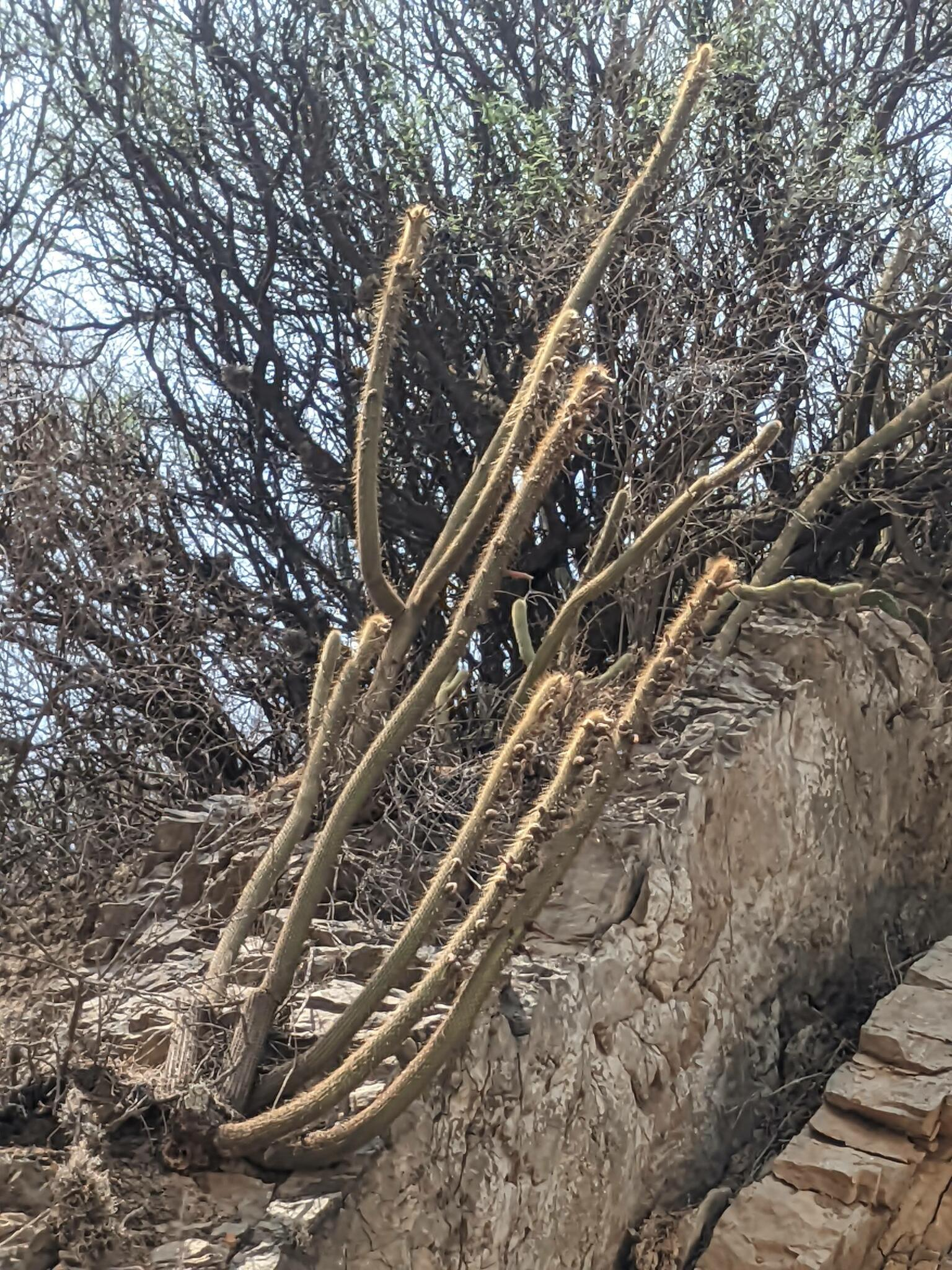
Habitat in Sucre, Bolivia

== Taxonomy ==
The first description was in 1936 by Curt Backeberg who named the plant in honor of cactus collector Otto Buchtien. A nomenclature synonym is Echinopsis buchtienii (Backeb.) Anceschi & Magli (2013).
