= List of Quercus species =

Oaks and related plants

The genus Quercus contains about 500 known species, plus about 180 hybrids between them. The genus, as is the case with many large genera, is divided into subgenera and sections. Traditionally, the genus Quercus was divided into the two subgenera Cyclobalanopsis, the ring-cupped oaks, and Quercus, which included all the other sections. However, a comprehensive revision in 2017 identified different relationships. Now the genus is commonly divided into a subgenus Quercus and a subgenus Cerris, with Cyclobalanopsis included in the latter. The sections of subgenus Quercus are mostly native to the New World, with the notable exception of the white oaks of sect. Quercus and the endemic Quercus pontica. In contrast, the sections of the subgenus Cerris are exclusively native to the Old World.

Unless otherwise indicated, the lists which follow contain all the species accepted by Plants of the World Online as of February 2023, plus selected hybrids that are also accepted, with placement into sections based on a list produced by Denk et al. for their 2017 classification of the genus.

== Legend ==
Species with evergreen foliage ("live oaks") are tagged '#'. Species in the genus have been recategorized between deciduous and evergreen on numerous occasions, although this does not necessarily mean that species in the two groups are closely related.

== Subgenus Quercus ==
=== Section Quercus ===
Section Mesobalanus was included in section Quercus in the 2017 classification used here. Other synonyms include Q. sect. Albae and Q. sect. Macrocarpae. The section comprises the white oaks from Europe, Asia, north Africa, Central and North America. Styles short; acorns mature in 6 months, sweet or slightly bitter, inside of acorn shell hairless.

- Quercus aculcingensis Trel. – Mexico
- Quercus ajoensis C.H.Mull. – Ajo Mountain shrub oak, Blue shrub oak – Arizona, New Mexico, Baja California
- Quercus alba L. – white oak – eastern and central North America
- Quercus aliena Blume – Oriental white oak – eastern Asia
- Quercus alpescens Trel. – Mexico
- Quercus ariifolia Trel. – Mexico (Sierra Madre Oriental)
- Quercus arizonica Sarg. – Arizona white oak – # southwestern U.S., northwestern Mexico
- Quercus aurea Wierzb. – southeastern and south-central Europe
- Quercus austrina Small – bluff oak – southeastern North America
- Quercus barrancana Spellenb. – Mexico (Chihuahua)
- Quercus × basaseachicensis C.H.Mull. – Mexico (Chihuahua, Durango)
- Quercus × bebbiana C.K.Schneid. — Bebb's oak — northeastern North America
- Quercus berberidifolia Liebm. – California scrub oak – # California
- Quercus bicolor Willd. – swamp white oak – eastern and midwestern North America
- Quercus × bimundorum E.J.Palmer - two worlds oak - U.S.
- Quercus boyntonii Beadle – Boynton's post oak – south central North America
- Quercus canariensis Willd. – Mirbeck's oak or Algerian oak – # North Africa & Spain
- Quercus carmenensis C.H.Mull. – Carmen oak – Coahuila and Texas
- Quercus centenaria L.M.González – southwestern Mexico (Jalisco and Nayarit)
- Quercus × cerrioides Willk. & Costa – east Spain
- Quercus chapmanii Sarg. – Chapman oak – # southeastern U.S.
- Quercus chartacea Trel. – Southern Mexico
- Quercus chihuahuensis Trel. – Chihuahua oak – northern Mexico and Texas
- Quercus congesta C.Presl – Italy
- Quercus convallata Trel. – Mexico
- Quercus copeyensis C.H.Mull. – # Costa Rica, Panama
- Quercus cornelius-mulleri Nixon & K.P.Steele – Muller oak – # southwestern North America
- Quercus corrugata Hook. – Mexico, Central America
- Quercus dalechampii Ten. – southeastern Europe
- Quercus deliquescens C.H.Mull. – Mexico
- Quercus dentata Thunb. – daimyo oak – eastern Asia
- Quercus depressipes Trel. – Davis Mountain oak – northern Mexico and Texas
- Quercus deserticola Trel. – # Mexico
- Quercus diversifolia Née – Mexico
- Quercus douglasii Hook. & Arn. – blue oak – California
- Quercus dumosa Nutt. – coastal scrub oak – # southern California, Baja California, Arizona
- Quercus durata Jeps. – leather oak – # California
- Quercus edwardsiae C.H.Mull. – Mexico
- Quercus engelmannii Greene – Engelmann oak – # southern California, Baja California
- Quercus estremadurensis O.Schwarz – Portugal, Spain, Morocco
- Quercus fabri Hance – Faber's oak – central to southern China
- Quercus faginea Lam. – Portuguese oak – # southwestern Europe
- Quercus frainetto Ten. — Hungarian oak — southeastern Europe
- Quercus frutex Trel. – Mexico
- †Quercus furuhjelmi — Eocene to Miocene - Alaska, Kazakhstan
- Quercus gambelii Nutt. – Gambel oak – southwestern North America
- Quercus garryana Douglas ex Hook. – Oregon white oak or Garry oak – western North America
- Quercus germana Schltdl. & Cham. – Mexico
- Quercus glabrescens Benth. – Mexico
- Quercus glaucescens Bonpl. – encino blanco – Mexico
- Quercus glaucoides M.Martens & Galeotti – # Mexico
- Quercus greggii (A.DC.) Trel. – # Mexico
- Quercus griffithii Hook.f. & Thomson ex Miq. – southeast Asia
- Quercus grisea Liebm. – gray oak – # southwestern North America
- Quercus hartwissiana Steven – Strandzha oak – southeastern Bulgaria, northern Turkey, western Georgia, southwestern Russia
- Quercus havardii Rydb. – Havard oak, shinnery oak, shin oak – south central North America
- †Quercus hiholensis — Miocene — # Washington State
- Quercus hinckleyi C.H.Mull. – Hinckley oak – # Texas, northwestern Mexico
- Quercus ichnusae Mossa, Bacch. & Brullo – Sardinia
- Quercus infectoria G.Olivier – Aleppo oak, Cyprus oak – southern Europe, southwestern Asia
- Quercus insignis M.Martens & Galeotti – Mexico, Belize, Costa Rica, Guatemala, Panama
- Quercus intricata Trel. – Coahuila scrub oak – # two isolated localities in west Texas, northern Mexico
- Quercus invaginata Trel. – Mexico
- Quercus john-tuckeri Nixon & C.H.Mull. – Tucker's oak – California
- Quercus juergensenii Liebm. – Mexico
- Quercus kotschyana O.Schwarz – Lebanon
- Quercus laceyi Small – lacey oak – Edwards Plateau of Texas, northern Mexico
- Quercus laeta Liebm. – Mexico
- Quercus lancifolia Schltdl. & Cham. – southwestern North America, Mexico, South America
- Quercus liebmannii Oerst. ex Trel. — Mexico
- Quercus lobata Née – valley oak or California white oak – California
- Quercus lusitanica Lam. – gall oak or Lusitanian oak – Iberia, North Africa
- Quercus lyrata Walter – overcup oak – eastern North America
- Quercus × macdonaldii Greene & Kellogg – California
- Quercus macdougallii Martínez – Mexico
- Quercus macranthera Fisch. & C.A.Mey. ex Hohen. – Caucasian oak or Persian oak – western Asia
- Quercus macrocarpa Michx. – bur oak – eastern and central North America
- Quercus magnoliifolia Née – Mexico
- Quercus manzanillana Trel. – Mexico
- Quercus margarettae (also Q. margaretiae and Q. margarettiae) — sand post oak — southeastern North America
- Quercus martinezii C.H.Mull. – # Mexico
- Quercus melissae Nixon & Barrie – Mexico (Chiapas) and Guatemala
- Quercus michauxii Nutt. – swamp chestnut oak – eastern North America
- Quercus microphylla Née – Mexico
- Quercus mohriana Buckley ex Rydb. – Mohr oak – # southwestern North America
- Quercus mongolica Fisch. ex Ledeb. – Mongolian oak – eastern Asia
- Quercus monnula Y.C.Hsu & H.Wei Jen – south-central China
- Quercus montana Willd. – chestnut oak – eastern North America (= Quercus prinus)
- Quercus muehlenbergii Engelm. – Chinkapin oak – eastern, central, and southwestern US (West Texas and New Mexico), northern Mexico
- Quercus neoplatyphylla A.Camus – central and southwestern Mexico
- Quercus ningqiangensis S.Z.Qu & W.H.Zhang – southeastern China
- Quercus oblongifolia Torr. – Arizona blue oak, Southwestern blue oak, or Mexican blue oak – # southwestern U.S., northwestern Mexico
- Quercus obtusata Bonpl. – Mexico
- Quercus oglethorpensis W.H.Duncan – Oglethorpe oak – southeastern North America
- Quercus oocarpa Liebm. – Mexico
- Quercus opaca Trel. – Mexico
- Quercus pacifica Nixon & C.H.Mull. – # Channel Islands, California
- Quercus pauciradiata Penas, Llamas, Pérez Morales & Acedo – Spain
- Quercus peduncularis Née – # Central America
- Quercus perpallida Trel. – Mexico
- Quercus petraea (Matt.) Liebl. – sessile oak, durmast oak – Europe, Anatolia
  - Quercus petraea subsp. polycarpa (Schur) Soó - Georgian oak - Austria to Iran and the Caucasus
  - Quercus petraea subsp. pinnatiloba (K.Koch) Menitsky - Lebanon-Syria, Turkey, South Caucasus
- Quercus polymorpha Schltdl. & Cham. – Monterrey oak, Mexican white oak – # Mexico and extreme S. Texas
- Quercus porphyrogenita Trel. – Mexico
- Quercus potosina Trel. – Mexico
- Quercus praeco Trel. – Mexico
- Quercus pringlei Seemen ex Loes. – Mexico
- Quercus prinoides Willd. – dwarf chinkapin oak – eastern North America
- Quercus pubescens Willd. – downy oak or Italian oak – Europe, Anatolia
- Quercus pungens Liebm. – sandpaper oak or pungens oak – southwestern U.S., Mexico
- Quercus purhepecha De Luna-Bon., S.Valencia & Coombes – Mexico (Michoacán)
- Quercus purulhana Trel. – Mexico, Central America
- Quercus pyrenaica Willd. – Pyrenean oak – southwestern Europe
- Quercus rekonis Trel. – Mexico
- Quercus repanda Bonpl. – Mexico
- Quercus resinosa Liebm. – Mexico
- Quercus robur L. – pedunculate oak, English oak or French oak – Europe, West Asia
- Quercus rugosa Née – netleaf oak or Rugosa oak – # southwestern U.S., northwestern Mexico
- Quercus sanchez-colinii Martínez – Mexico
- Quercus × schuettei Trel. — Schuette's oak — US, Canada
- Quercus sebifera Trel. – # Mexico
- Quercus segoviensis Liebm. – Mexico and northern Central America
- Quercus serrata Murray – bao li – # China, Taiwan, Japan, Korea
- Quercus shennongii C.C.Huang & S.H.Fu – southeastern China
- Quercus shingjenensis Y.T.Chang – China (Guizhou)
- Quercus similis Ashe – swamp post oak – southeastern North America
- Quercus sinuata Walter – bastard oak – southern US (formerly identified as Quercus durandii)
- Quercus sororia Liebm. – Mexico
- Quercus stellata Wangenh. – post oak – eastern North America
- Quercus striatula Trel. – Mexico (Sierra Madre Occidental and Mexican Plateau ranges)
- Quercus subspathulata Trel. – Mexico
- Quercus supranitida C.H.Mull. – Mexico
- Quercus tinkhamii C.H.Mull. — Mexico
- Quercus toumeyi Sarg. — Toumey oak — # southwest New Mexico, southeastern Arizona, northern Mexico
- Quercus toxicodendrifolia Trel. – eastern and southeastern Mexico
- Quercus tsinglingensis S.L.Liou ex S.Z.Qu & W.H.Zhang – southeastern China
- Quercus tuberculata Liebm. — Mexico
- Quercus turbinella Greene — turbinella oak, Arizona Blue Shrub oak, Shrub live oak or scrub live oak — # southwestern North America
- Quercus vallicola Trel. – central Mexico
- Quercus vaseyana Buckley — Vasey oak — # southwestern North America
- Quercus verde C.H.Mull. — Mexico
- Quercus vicentensis Trel. — El Salvador, Guatemala, and southern Mexico
- Quercus vulcanica Boiss. & Heldr. ex Kotschy — Kasnak oak — southwestern Asia
- Quercus welshii R.A.Denham — havard oak, Utah sand oak, wavy leaf oak — # southwestern North America
- Quercus wutaishanica Mayr — Liaoning oak — China, Mongolia
- Quercus xylina Scheidw. — Mexico

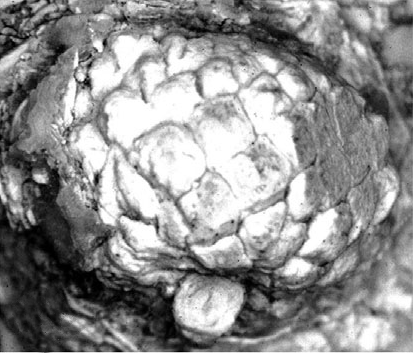
†Quercus hiholensis acorn in matrix

=== Section Ponticae ===
Species are native to Western Asia and Western North America. They produce catkins up to 10cm long; the acorns mature annually.

- Quercus pontica — Pontine oak — western Asia
- Quercus sadleriana — deer oak — # southwestern Oregon, northern California

=== Section Protobalanus ===
The intermediate oaks. Southwest USA and northwest Mexico. Styles short, acorns mature in 18 months, very bitter, inside of acorn shell woolly.

- Quercus cedrosensis — Cedros Island oak — # California, Baja California
- Quercus chrysolepis — canyon live oak — # southwestern North America
- Quercus palmeri — Palmer oak — # California, western Arizona
- Quercus tomentella — island oak — # Channel Islands of California, Baja California (Guadalupe Island)
- Quercus vacciniifolia — huckleberry oak — # southwestern North America

=== Section Lobatae ===
The red oaks (synonym sect. Erythrobalanus), native to North, Central and South America. Styles long, acorns mature in 18 months (in most species), very bitter, inside of acorn shell woolly.

- Quercus acatenangensis Trel. – Mexico, Guatemala, El Salvador
- Quercus acerifolia (E.J.Palmer) Stoynoff & W.J.Hess ex R.J.Jensen – maple-leaved oak or mapleleaf oak – Arkansas
- Quercus acherdophylla Trel. – # Mexico
- Quercus acutangula Trel. – Mexico
- Quercus acutifolia, syn. Quercus conspersa — Mexico
- Quercus aerea Trel. — Mexico
- Quercus affinis Scheidw. – # Mexico
- Quercus agrifolia Née – coast live oak – # California, northern Baja California
- Quercus albocincta Trel. – Mexico (Sierra Madre Occidental)
- Quercus aristata Hook. & Arn. – Mexico
- Quercus arkansana Sarg. – Arkansas oak – southeastern North America
- Quercus benthamii A.DC. – # southern Mexico and Central America
- Quercus breedloveana Nixon & Barrie – Mexico (Chiapas and Guerrero)
- Quercus brenesii Trel. – Costa Rica, Mexico
- Quercus buckleyi Nixon & Dorr – Texas red oak – south central North America
- Quercus calophylla Schltdl. & Cham. — Mexico
- Quercus canbyi Trel. – Canby oak or Mexican red oak – # northeastern Mexico
- Quercus castanea Née – # Mexico
- Quercus charcasana Trel. ex A.Camus – Mexico
- Quercus chimaltenangana Trel. – Guatemala
- Quercus citrifolia Liebm. – Costa Rica, Guatemala, and Panama
- Quercus coahuilensis Nixon & C.H.Mull. – Mexico
- Quercus coccinea Münchh. – scarlet oak – eastern North America
- Quercus coffeicolor Trel. – Mexico
- Quercus confertifolia Bonpl. (syn. Quercus gentryi) — Mexico
- Quercus conzattii Trel. – Mexico
- Quercus cortesii Liebm. – # southern Mexico and Central America
- Quercus costaricensis Liebm. – # Costa Rica, Panama
- Quercus crassifolia Bonpl. – Mexico
- Quercus crassipes Bonpl. – Mexico
- Quercus crispifolia Trel. — Mexico
- Quercus crispipilis Trel. – Mexico, Guatemala
- Quercus cualensis L.M.González – # Mexico (Sierra Madre del Sur)
- Quercus delgadoana S.Valencia, Nixon & L.M.Kelly – Mexico
- Quercus depressa Bonpl. – Mexico
- Quercus devia Goldman – Mexico (Baja California Peninsula)
- Quercus durifolia Seemen ex Loes. – Mexico (Sierra Madre Occidental)
- Quercus × dysophylla — Mexico
- Quercus eduardi Trel. — Mexico
- Quercus ellipsoidalis E.J.Hill – northern pin oak – eastern North America
- Quercus elliptica Née – Mexico
- Quercus emoryi Torr. – Emory oak – # southwestern U.S., northern Mexico
- Quercus eugeniifolia Liebm. – Costa Rica
- Quercus falcata Michx. – southern red oak or Spanish oak – southeastern North America
- Quercus floccosa Liebm. – Mexico
- Quercus flocculenta C.H.Mull. — Mexico
- Quercus fulva Liebm. – Mexico
- Quercus furfuracea Liebm. – Mexico
- Quercus galeanensis C.H.Mull. – Mexico
- Quercus georgiana M.A.Curtis – Georgia oak – southeastern North America
- Quercus ghiesbreghtii M.Martens & Galeotti – Mexico (Veracruz)
- Quercus graciliformis C.H.Mull. – Texas
- Quercus gracilior C.H.Mull. – Honduras
- Quercus grahamii Benth. – Mexico
- Quercus gravesii Sudw. – Chisos red oak or Graves oak – Mexico, southwestern North America (Texas)
- Quercus gulielmi-treleasei C.H.Mull. – Costa Rica to western Panama
- Quercus hemisphaerica W.Bartram ex Willd. – laurel oak or Darlington oak – # southeastern North America
- Quercus hintonii E.F.Warb. – Mexico
- Quercus hintoniorum Nixon & C.H.Mull. – # Mexico
- Quercus hirtifolia M.L.Vázquez, S.Valencia & Nixon – # Mexico
- Quercus huicholensis R.A.McCauley – Mexico
- Quercus humboldtii Bonpl. – Andean oak – # northern South America (Colombia & Panama)
- Quercus hypoleucoides A.Camus – silverleaf oak – # southwestern North America
- Quercus hypoxantha Trel. – # Mexico
- Quercus ignaciensis C.H.Mull. – Sonora
- Quercus ilicifolia Wangenh. – bear oak – eastern North America
- Quercus iltisii L.M.González – western Mexico
- Quercus imbricaria Michx. – shingle oak – eastern North America
- Quercus incana W.Bartram – bluejack oak – southeastern North America
- Quercus inopina Ashe – sandhill oak – Florida
- Quercus jonesii Trel. – northern Mexico
- Quercus kelloggii Newb. – California black oak – California, southwestern Oregon
- Quercus laevis Walter – turkey oak – southeastern North America
- Quercus laurifolia Michx. – laurel oak – # southeastern North America
- Quercus laurina Bonpl. – # Mexico
- Quercus marilandica (L.) Münchh. – blackjack oak – eastern North America
- Quercus mcvaughii Spellenb. (orth. var. Q. macvaughii) — Mexico (northern and central Sierra Madre Occidental)
- Quercus meavei S.Valencia, Sabas & O.J.Soto – eastern and central Mexico
- Quercus mexiae L.M.González – Mexico (Jalisco)
- Quercus mexicana Bonpl. – Mexico
- Quercus miquihuanensis Nixon & C.H.Mull. – Mexico (Sierra Madre Oriental)
- Quercus mulleri Martínez – Mexico
- Quercus myrtifolia Willd. – myrtle oak – # southeastern North America
- Quercus nigra L. – water oak – # eastern North America
- Quercus nixoniana S.Valencia & Lozada-Pérez – Mexico
- Quercus obtusanthera Trel. – Mexico (Guerrero)
- Quercus pagoda Raf. – cherrybark oak – southeastern North America
- Quercus palustris Münchh. – pin oak – eastern North America
- Quercus panamandinaea C.H.Mull. – Panama
- Quercus parvula Greene – Shreve oak, Santa Cruz Island oak – # coastal California
- Quercus paxtalensis C.H.Mull. – Mexico
- Quercus peninsularis Trel. – Mexico (Baja California)
- Quercus pennivenia Trel. – Mexico
- Quercus phellos L. – willow oak – eastern North America
- Quercus pinnativenulosa C.H.Mull. – Mexico
- Quercus planipocula Trel. – western Mexico
- Quercus pumila Walter – runner oak – # southeastern North America
- Quercus radiata Trel. – Mexico (southern Sierra Madre Occidental)
- Quercus robusta C.H.Mull. – Chisos Mountains of Texas
- Quercus rubra L. – northern red oak – eastern North America
- Quercus rubramenta Trel. – Mexico
- Quercus runcinatifolia Trel. & C.H.Mull. – Mexico
- Quercus rysophylla Weath. – loquat-leaf oak – # Mexico
- Quercus salasiae S.Valencia & O.J.Soto – southern Mexico
- Quercus salicifolia Née – # Mexico
- Quercus saltillensis Trel. — Mexico
- Quercus sapotifolia Liebm. – # southern Mexico, Central America
- Quercus sarahmariae Nixon & Barrie – Costa Rica and Panama
- Quercus sartorii Liebm. – Mexico
- Quercus scytophylla Liebm. — Mexico
- Quercus seemannii Liebm. – southeastern Mexico and Central America
- Quercus shumardii Buckley – Shumard oak – eastern North America
- Quercus sideroxyla Bonpl. – Mexico
- Quercus skinneri Benth. – Mexico (Chiapas, Oaxaca, Tamaulipas, Veracruz) Guatemala, El Salvador, Honduras
- Quercus tarahumara Spellenb., J.D.Bacon & Breedlove – Mexico
- Quercus tardifolia C.H.Mull. – lateleaf oak – # two small clumps in Chisos Mountains of Texas
- Quercus texana Buckley – Nuttall's oak – south central North America (Lower Mississippi River Valley)
- Quercus tonduzii Seemen – Costa Rica
- Quercus tuitensis L.M.González — Mexico
- Quercus urbani Trel. – Mexico
- Quercus uxoris McVaugh – Mexico
- Quercus velutina Lam. – black oak or eastern black oak or dyer's oak – eastern North America
- Quercus viminea Trel. – # Mexico
- Quercus wislizeni A.DC. – interior live oak – # California
- Quercus xalapensis Bonpl. – Mexico, Central America

=== Section Virentes ===
Section Virentes has also been treated at lower ranks. Species are native south-eastern Northern America, Mexico, the West Indies (Cuba), and Central America. A 2017 classification included seven species:

- Quercus brandegeei Goldman – Brandegee oak- Baja California Sur
- Quercus fusiformis Small – Texas live oak or plateau live oak – # south central North America
- Quercus geminata Small – sand live oak – # southeastern United States
- Quercus minima (Sarg.) Small – dwarf live oak – # southeastern North America
- Quercus oleoides Schltdl. & Cham. – # from Costa Rica into Mexico
- Quercus sagraeana (also spelt Q. sagrana) – Cuban oak – # western Cuba
- Quercus virginiana Mill. – southern live oak – # southeastern North America

== Subgenus Cerris ==
=== Section Cerris ===
Species are native to Europe, north Africa and Asia. Styles long; acorns mature in 18 months, very bitter, inside of acorn shell hairless or slightly hairy.

- Quercus acutissima Carruth. – sawtooth oak – # China (including Tibet), Korea, Japan, Indochina, the Himalayas (Nepal, Bhutan, northeastern India).
- Quercus afares Pomel – African oak – North Africa
- Quercus brantii Lindl. – Persian oak – southwestern Asia
- Quercus castaneifolia C.A.Mey. – chestnut-leaved oak – Caucasus, Iran (Persia)
- Quercus cerris L. – Turkey oak – southern Europe, southwestern Asia
- Quercus chenii Nakai – SE China
- Quercus × crenata Lam. – Spanish oak – France, mainland Italy, Sicily, former Yugoslavia
- Quercus gussonei (Borzì) Brullo – northern Sicily
- Quercus apiculata Djav.-Khoie – northwestern Iran
- Quercus carduchorum Koch – northwestern Iran
- Quercus ithaburensis Decne. – southeastern Europe, southwestern Asia
  - Quercus ithaburensis subsp. ithaburensis — Mount Tabor's oak — Levant and southeast Anatolia
  - Quercus ithaburensis subsp. macrolepis, syn. Quercus macrolepis — Vallonea oak — # southeastern Europe, Anatolia
- Quercus libani G.Olivier – Lebanon oak – southwestern Asia
- Quercus look Kotschy – Levant
- Quercus magnosquamata Djav.-Khoie – northwestern Iran
- Quercus ophiosquamata Djav.-Khoie – northwestern Iran
- Quercus persica Jaub. & Spach – western Iran
- Quercus saei Djav.-Khoie – southwestern Iran
- Quercus suber L. – cork oak – # southwestern Europe, northwestern Africa
- Quercus trojana Webb – Macedonian oak – # southeastern Europe
- Quercus ungeri Kotschy – northwestern Iran
- Quercus variabilis Blume – Chinese cork oak – eastern Asia

=== Section Ilex ===
Species in section Ilex are native to Eurasia and northern Africa. Styles medium-long; acorns mature in 12–24 months, appearing hairy on the inside. Evergreen leaves, with bristle-like extensions on the teeth. (Sister group to sect. Cerris and sometimes included in it.)

- Quercus acrodonta Seemen — # China
- Quercus airensis Franco & Vasc. – Portugal
- Quercus alnifolia Poech — golden oak — # Cyprus
- Quercus aquifolioides Rehder & E.H.Wilson — # China (including Tibet)
- Quercus aucheri Jaub. & Spach – eastern Aegean Islands and southwestern Turkey
- Quercus baloot Griff. – Afghanistan to western Himalayas
- Quercus baronii Skan – China
- Quercus bawanglingensis C.C.Huang, Ze X.Li & F.W.Xing – # Hainan
- Quercus coccifera L., syn. Quercus calliprinos Webb – kermes oak – # southern Europe
- Quercus cocciferoides Hand.-Mazz. – south-central China
- Quercus dolicholepis A.Camus – China
- Quercus engleriana Seemen – Tibet and southern China
- Quercus fimbriata Y.C.Hsu & H.Wei Jen – south-central China
- Quercus floribunda Lindl. ex A.Camus – Moru oak – # Himalayas
- Quercus franchetii Skan – China, eastern Asia
- Quercus gilliana Rehder & E.H.Wilson – Tibet and China (Sichuan, Yunnan, and Gansu)
- Quercus guyavifolia H.Lév. – China
- Quercus handeliana A.Camus – China (Yunnan)
- Quercus ilex L. – holly oak or holm oak – # southern Europe
- Quercus kingiana Craib – south-Central China, Myanmar, and Thailand
- Quercus kongshanensis Y.C.Hsu & H.Wei Jen – China (Sichuan)
- Quercus lanata Sm. – woolly-leaved oak – # Himalayas, southeast Asia
- Quercus leucotrichophora A.Camus – Banj oak, blackjack oak, grey oak – # Himalayas
- Quercus lodicosa O.E.Warb. & E.F.Warb. – Assam, southeastern Tibet, northern Myanmar
- Quercus longispica (Hand.-Mazz.) A.Camus – China (Yunnan and Sichuan)
- Quercus marlipoensis Hu & W.C.Cheng – China (Yunnan)
- Quercus monimotricha (Hand.-Mazz.) Hand.-Mazz. – south-central China and northern Myanmar
- Quercus oxyphylla (E.H.Wilson) Hand.-Mazz. – China
- Quercus pannosa Hand.-Mazz. # – China
- Quercus phillyreoides A.Gray – Southern China, Ryukyu Islands, Japan
- Quercus pseudococcifera Desf. – Iberia, Morocco, Algeria, Tunisia, Sardinia, Sicily
- Quercus pseudosetulosa Q.S.Li & T.Y.Tu – China (Guangdong)
- Quercus rehderiana Hand.-Mazz. – Tibet to China (Yunnan, Sichuan, Guizhou)
- Quercus rotundifolia Lam. – ballota oak or holm oak – # Iberian peninsula, northwestern Africa
- Quercus semecarpifolia Sm. – brown oak or Kharshu oak – # Himalayas
- Quercus senescens Hand.-Mazz. – Eastern Himalayas, Tibet, south-central China
- Quercus setulosa Hickel & A.Camus – # Laos, Vietnam
- Quercus shangxiensis Z.K.Zhou – China (Shanxi)
- Quercus spinosa David – China, Myanmar
- Quercus tarokoensis Hayata – eastern Taiwan
- Quercus tatakaensis Tomiya – Taiwan
- Quercus trungkhanhensis H.T.Binh & Ngoc – Vietnam
- Quercus tungmaiensis Y.T.Chang – Arunachal Pradesh and southeastern Tibet
- Quercus utilis Hu & W.C.Cheng – China (Yunnan, Guizhou, and Guangxi)
- Quercus yiwuensis Y.C.Hsu & H.Wei Jen – China (Yunnan)
- Quercus zhekunii M.Deng & J.Huang – China (Guangxi)

=== Section Cyclobalanopsis ===
The ring-cupped oaks (synonym genus Cyclobalanopsis), native to eastern and southeastern tropical Asia. They have corns with distinctive cups bearing concrescent rings of scales. They commonly also have densely clustered acorns, though this does not apply to all of the species. About 90 species.

Species

- Quercus acuta Thunb. – Japanese evergreen oak. # Japan, Korea
- Quercus albicaulis Chun & W.C.Ko – # China
- Quercus annulata Sm. – # The Himalayas to Vietnam
- Quercus arbutifolia Hickel & A.Camus – # Vietnam (endemic)
- Quercus argentata Korth. – # Malaysia, Indonesia
- Quercus argyrotricha A.Camus – # Guizhou (China)
- Quercus asymmetrica Hickel & A.Camus – # China, northern Vietnam
- Quercus augustinei Skan (spelling corrected from augustinii) – # China, Vietnam
- Quercus auricoma A.Camus – northern Vietnam
- Quercus austrocochinchinensis Hickel & A.Camus – # Yunnan (China), Thailand, Vietnam
- Quercus bambusifolia Hance – China (Guangdong, Guangxi), northern Vietnam
- Quercus baniensis A.Camus – central Vietnam
- Quercus baolamensis H.T.Binh & Ngoc – Vietnam
- Quercus bella Chun & Tsiang – # China
- Quercus bidoupensis H.T.Binh & Ngoc – Vietnam
- Quercus blakei Skan (syn. Q. chrysocalyx) — # China, Laos, Vietnam
- Quercus blaoensis A.Camus – southeastern Vietnam
- Quercus braianensis A.Camus – # Vietnam (endemic)
- Quercus brandisiana Kurz – upland Indochina, Bangladesh
- Quercus brevicalyx A.Camus — # China, Laos
- Quercus breviradiata (W.C.Cheng) C.C.Huang – central and south-central China
- Quercus cambodiensis Hickel & A.Camus – Cambodia
- Quercus championii Benth. – # China, Taiwan
- Quercus chevalieri Hickel & A.Camus – # China, Vietnam
- Quercus chrysocalyx Hickel & A.Camus – # Vietnam
- Quercus chrysotricha A.Camus – Borneo (Sarawak)
- Quercus chungii F.P.Metcalf – # China
- Quercus ciliaris C.C.Huang & Y.T.Chang – China (Hubei, Sichuan, Zhejiang, Anhui)
- Quercus conduplicans Chun – China (Guangdong)
- Quercus daimingshanensis (S.K.Lee) C.C.Huang – # China
- Quercus dankiaensis A.Camus — # Vietnam (endemic)
- Quercus delavayi Franch. – # China
- Quercus delicatula Chun & Tsiang – # China
- Quercus dilacerata Hickel & A.Camus – northern Vietnam
- Quercus dinghuensis C.C.Huang – # China
- Quercus disciformis Chun & Tsiang – # China
- Quercus dongfangensis C.C.Huang, F.W.Xing & Ze X.Li – Hainan
- Quercus donnaiensis A.Camus – southeastern Vietnam
- Quercus edithiae Skan – # China, Vietnam
- Quercus elevaticostata (Q.F.Zheng) C.C.Huang – # Fujian (China)
- Quercus elmeri Merr. – Sumatra, Borneo, Peninsular Malaysia
- Quercus eumorpha Kurz – southern Myanmar
- Quercus fuliginosa Chun & W.C.Ko – Hainan
- Quercus gaharuensis Soepadmo – western Borneo, eastern Sumatra, Peninsular Malaysia
- Quercus gambleana A.Camus – # China, India
- Quercus gemelliflora Blume – # Malaysia, Indonesia, Vietnam
- Quercus gilva Blume – # Japan, Taiwan, China
- Quercus glauca Thunb. – ring-cupped oak – # from Afghanistan to Japan and Vietnam
- Quercus globosa (T.P.Lin & T.S.Liu) J.C.Liao – Taiwan
- Quercus gomeziana A.Camus – # Vietnam
- Quercus gracilenta Chun – China (Guangdong)
- Quercus hainanica C.C.Huang & Y.T.Chang – Hainan (China)
- Quercus helferiana A.DC. – # China, India, Burma/Myanmar, Thailand, Laos, Vietnam
- Quercus honbaensis H.T.Binh, Tagane & Yahara – Vietnam
- Quercus hondae Makino – # Kyūshū (Japan)
- Quercus hui Chun – China
- Quercus hypargyrea (Seemen ex Diels) C.C.Huang & Y.T.Chang (as Q. multinervis) — # China
- Quercus hypophaea Hayata – # Taiwan
- Quercus jenseniana Hand.-Mazz. – # China
- Quercus jinpinensis (Y.C.Hsu & H.Wei Jen) C.C.Huang – # China
- Quercus kerangasensis Soepadmo – Borneo
- Quercus kerrii Craib – Kerr's oak – # Vietnam, Thailand, possibly China
- Quercus kinabaluensis Soepadmo – Borneo
- Quercus kiukiangensis (Y.T.Chang) Y.T.Chang – # China
- Quercus kouangsiensis A.Camus – # China
- Quercus lamellosa Sm. – # Himalayas
- Quercus langbianensis Hickel & A.Camus (syn. Q. camusiae) – # Cambodia, China, Vietnam
- Quercus lenticellata Barnett – northern Thailand
- Quercus liaoi C.F.Shen – Taiwan
- Quercus liboensis Z.K.Zhou – Guizhou (China)
- Quercus lineata Blume – # Assam, Bangladesh, Indochina, Hainan, Malaysia, western Indonesia
- Quercus litseoides Dunn – # China
- Quercus lobbii Hook.f. & Thomson ex Ettingsh. – # China, India
- Quercus longinux Hayata – # Taiwan
- Quercus lowii King – # Borneo
- Quercus lungmaiensis (Hu) C.C.Huang & Y.T.Chang – # Yunnan (China)
- Quercus macrocalyx Hickel & A.Camus – # Vietnam
- Quercus mangdenensis H.T.Binh & Ngoc – # Vietnam
- Quercus meihuashanensis (Q.F.Zheng) C.C.Huang – China (Fujian)
- Quercus merrillii Seemen – # Sabah and Sarawak (Malaysia), Palawan (Philippines)
- Quercus mespilifolia Wall. ex A.DC. – # Vietnam
- Quercus miyagii (orth. var. Q. miyagei) — Ryukyu Islands
- Quercus morii Hayata – # Taiwan
- Quercus motuoensis C.C.Huang – # China
- Quercus myrsinifolia Blume (syn. Q. neglecta) – bamboo-leaf oak – # China, Japan, Korea, Laos, Thailand, Vietnam
- Quercus ningangensis (orth. var. Q. ninggangensis) — # China
- Quercus nivea King – Malaysia (Peninsular Malaysia, Sarawak)
- Quercus ngochoaensis H.T.Binh & T.S.Hoang – Vietnam
- Quercus oidocarpa Korth. – Myanmar, Thailand, Vietnam, Malaysia, Indonesia (Kalimantan, Sumatra, Bangka)
- Quercus oxyodon Miq. (syn. Q. songtavanensis) – # Assam, Myanmar, China, Bhutan, Nepal, northern Vietnam
- Quercus pachyloma Seemen – # China, Taiwan
- Quercus pentacycla Y.T.Chang – # China
- Quercus percoriacea Soepadmo – Borneo
- Quercus petelotii A.Camus – # Vietnam (endemic)
- Quercus phanera Chun – # China
- Quercus pinbianensis (Y.C.Hsu & H.Wei Jen) C.C.Huang & Y.T.Chang – China (Yunnan)
- Quercus platycalyx Hickel & A.Camus – Vietnam
- Quercus poilanei (orth. var. Q. poilanii) — # China, Thailand, Vietnam
- Quercus pseudoverticillata Soepadmo – Borneo
- Quercus quangtriensis Hickel & A.Camus – # Vietnam
- Quercus ramsbottomii A.Camus – Myanmar, Thailand
- Quercus repandifolia J.C.Liao – Taiwan
- Quercus rex Hemsl. – # China, India, Laos, Myanmar, Vietnam
- Quercus rupestris Hickel & A.Camus – # Vietnam (endemic)
- Quercus salicina Blume – # Japan, South Korea
- Quercus saravanensis A.Camus – # China, Laos, Vietnam
- Quercus schottkyana Rehder & E.H.Wilson – # China
- Quercus semiserrata Roxb. – # China, Bangladesh, India, Myanmar, Thailand
- Quercus semiserratoides (Y.C.Hsu & H.Wei Jen) C.C.Huang & Y.T.Chang – China (southeastern Yunnan)
- Quercus sessilifolia Blume – # Japan, Taiwan, China
- Quercus sichourensis (Y.C.Hsu) C.C.Huang & Y.T.Chang – # Yunnan (China)
- Quercus sontraensis Ngoc, H.T.Binh & Son – Vietnam
- Quercus steenisii Soepadmo – northern Sumatra
- Quercus stenophylloides Hayata – # Taiwan
- Quercus stewardiana A.Camus – # China
- Quercus subsericea A.Camus – # Sumatra, Borneo, western Java, Malay Peninsula, Palawan
- Quercus sumatrana Soepadmo – # Sumatra and Borneo
- Quercus thomsoniana A.DC. – Sikkim, Bhutan, northern Bangladesh
- Quercus thorelii Hickel & A.Camus – # China, Laos, Vietnam
- Quercus tiaoloshanica Chun & W.C.Ko – Hainan
- Quercus tomentosinervis (Y.C.Hsu & H.Wei Jen) C.C.Huang – # China
- Quercus treubiana Seemen – # Sumatra, Borneo
- Quercus valdinervosa Soepadmo – Borneo
- Quercus vestita Griff. – Assam
- Quercus xanthoclada Drake – Myanmar, Laos, Vietnam
- Quercus xanthotricha A.Camus – # China, Laos, Vietnam
- Quercus xuanlienensis H.T.Binh, Ngoc & T.N.Bo – Vietnam
- Quercus yonganensis L.K.Ling & C.C.Huang – # China
- Quercus yongchuniana Z.K.Zhou

== Section uncertain ==
- Quercus changhualingensis (G.A.Fu & X.J.Hong) N.H.Xia & Y.H.Tong – Hainan
- Quercus schultzei Trel. – Mexico (Guerrero)
- Quercus yanqianii (G.A.Fu) N.H.Xia & Y.H.Tong – Hainan

== Intersectional hybrids ==
- Quercus × turneri = Quercus ilex × Quercus robur — sect. Ilex × sect. Quercus – Turner's oak — Spain

== Intersubgeneric hybrids ==
- Quercus × kewensis = Quercus wislizeni × Quercus cerris — subg. Quercus × subg. Cerris – Kew oak
