= Quercus ningqiangensis =

Conservation status
- Data Deficient (IUCN 3.1)

Scientific classification
- Kingdom: Plantae
- Clade: Embryophytes
- Clade: Tracheophytes
- Clade: Spermatophytes
- Clade: Angiosperms
- Clade: Eudicots
- Clade: Rosids
- Order: Fagales
- Family: Fagaceae
- Genus: Quercus
- Subgenus: Quercus subg. Quercus
- Section: Quercus sect. Quercus
- Species: Q. ningqiangensis

Binomial name
- Quercus ningqiangensis S.Z.Qu & W.H.Zhang

Species of flowering plant

Quercus ningqiangensis is a species of oak. It is a tree endemic to southeastern China. Little is known about the species' habitat and population, and the IUCN Red List assesses the species as Data Deficient.

The species was described by Shi Zeng Qu and Weng Hui Zhang in 1986.
