= Quercus ciliaris =

Conservation status
- Least Concern (IUCN 3.1)

Scientific classification
- Kingdom: Plantae
- Clade: Embryophytes
- Clade: Tracheophytes
- Clade: Spermatophytes
- Clade: Angiosperms
- Clade: Eudicots
- Clade: Rosids
- Order: Fagales
- Family: Fagaceae
- Genus: Quercus
- Subgenus: Quercus subg. Cerris
- Section: Quercus sect. Cyclobalanopsis
- Species: Q. ciliaris

Binomial name
- Quercus ciliaris C.C.Huang & Y.T.Chang

Synonyms
- Cyclobalanopsis glauca var. gracilis (Rehder & E.H.Wilson) Y.T.Chang; Cyclobalanopsis gracilis (Rehder & E.H.Wilson) W.C.Cheng & T.Hong (1963), non Menzel (1921), fossil name.; Quercus glauca f. gracilis Rehder & E.H.Wilson; Quercus glauca var. gracilis (Rehder & E.H.Wilson) A.Camus; Quercus gracilis (Rehder & E.H.Wilson) Wuzhi

Species of flowering plant

Quercus ciliaris is a species of oak native to China in the provinces of Anhui, Fujian, Gansu, Guangdong, Guangxi, Guizhou, Hubei, Hunan, Jiangsu, Jiangxi, Shaanxi, Sichuan, Zhejiang.
