= Quercus gracilenta =

Conservation status
- Data Deficient (IUCN 3.1)

Scientific classification
- Kingdom: Plantae
- Clade: Embryophytes
- Clade: Tracheophytes
- Clade: Spermatophytes
- Clade: Angiosperms
- Clade: Eudicots
- Clade: Rosids
- Order: Fagales
- Family: Fagaceae
- Genus: Quercus
- Subgenus: Quercus subg. Cerris
- Section: Quercus sect. Cyclobalanopsis
- Species: Q. gracilenta

Binomial name
- Quercus gracilenta Chun

Species of flowering plant

Quercus gracilenta is a species of oak. It is a tree endemic to Guangdong Province in southern China. Little is known about the species' population and habitat, and the IUCN Red List assesses the species as Data Deficient.

The species was described by Woon Young Chun in 1947.
