= Quercus praeco =

Conservation status
- Least Concern (IUCN 3.1)

Scientific classification
- Kingdom: Plantae
- Clade: Tracheophytes
- Clade: Angiosperms
- Clade: Eudicots
- Clade: Rosids
- Order: Fagales
- Family: Fagaceae
- Genus: Quercus
- Subgenus: Quercus subg. Quercus
- Section: Quercus sect. Quercus
- Species: Q. praeco

Binomial name
- Quercus praeco Trel.

Species of oak tree

Quercus praeco is a Mexican species of trees in the beech family. It is native to the States of Jalisco and Nayarit in western Mexico and Nuevo León in northeastern Mexico.

Quercus praeco is a deciduous tree up to 7 metres (23 feet) tall with a trunk as much as 50 centimetres (20 inches) in diameter. The leaves are up to 14 cm (5 1/2 in) long, broadly egg-shaped, with shallow lobes or teeth along the edges. The upper side of the leaves is green, the underside yellowish because of many hairs.
