= Quercus yonganensis =

Conservation status
- Data Deficient (IUCN 3.1)

Scientific classification
- Kingdom: Plantae
- Clade: Embryophytes
- Clade: Tracheophytes
- Clade: Spermatophytes
- Clade: Angiosperms
- Clade: Eudicots
- Clade: Rosids
- Order: Fagales
- Family: Fagaceae
- Genus: Quercus
- Subgenus: Quercus subg. Cerris
- Section: Quercus sect. Cyclobalanopsis
- Species: Q. yonganensis

Binomial name
- Quercus yonganensis L.K.Ling & C.C.Huang

Synonyms
- Cyclobalanopsis yonganensis (L.K.Ling & C.C.Huang) Y.C.Hsu & H.Wei Jen

Species of flowering plant

Quercus yonganensis is a species of oak tree native to southeast China. It is placed in subgenus Cerris, section Cyclobalanopsis, the ring-cupped oaks.
