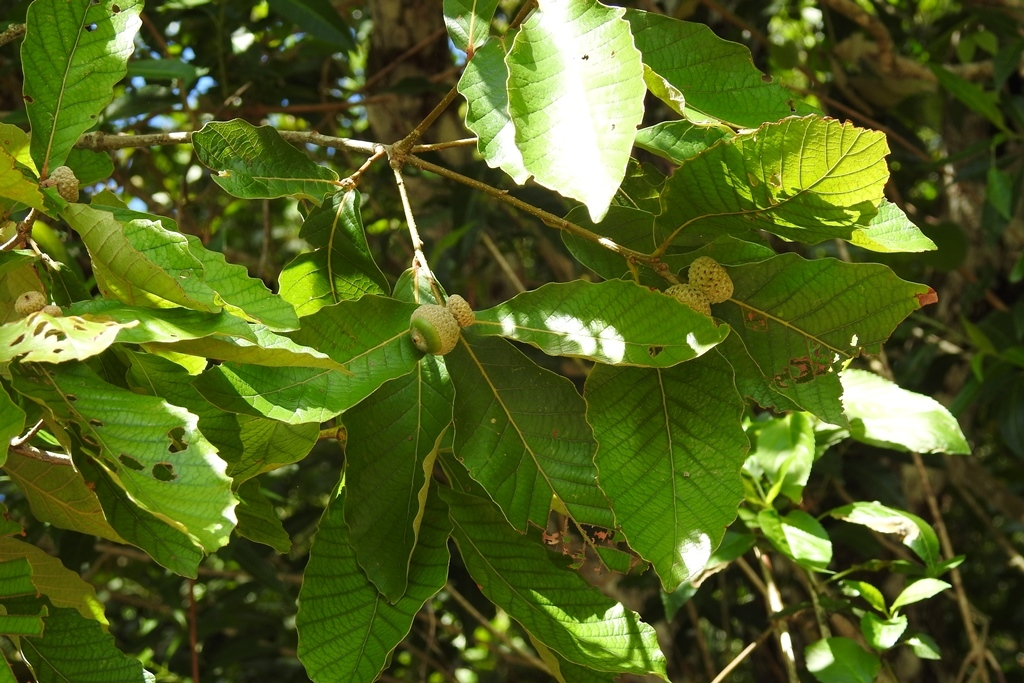

Conservation status
- Near Threatened (IUCN 3.1)

Scientific classification
- Kingdom: Plantae
- Clade: Embryophytes
- Clade: Tracheophytes
- Clade: Spermatophytes
- Clade: Angiosperms
- Clade: Eudicots
- Clade: Rosids
- Order: Fagales
- Family: Fagaceae
- Genus: Quercus
- Subgenus: Quercus subg. Quercus
- Section: Quercus sect. Quercus
- Species: Q. purulhana

Binomial name
- Quercus purulhana Trel.

= Quercus purulhana =

Species of oak tree

Quercus purulhana is a species of oak native to Mexico and Central America. It is found in Belize, Guatemala, Honduras, Nicaragua, and the southern Mexican state of Chiapas. It is a montane forest species. It is an IUCN Red List near-threatened species, threatened by habitat loss. It is placed in section Quercus.
