= Quercus ningangensis =

Conservation status
- Data Deficient (IUCN 3.1)

Scientific classification
- Kingdom: Plantae
- Clade: Embryophytes
- Clade: Tracheophytes
- Clade: Spermatophytes
- Clade: Angiosperms
- Clade: Eudicots
- Clade: Rosids
- Order: Fagales
- Family: Fagaceae
- Genus: Quercus
- Subgenus: Quercus subg. Cerris
- Section: Quercus sect. Cyclobalanopsis
- Species: Q. ningangensis

Binomial name
- Quercus ningangensis (W.C.Cheng & Y.C.Hsu) C.C.Huang (1992)

Synonyms
- Cyclobalanopsis ningangensis W.C.Cheng & Y.C.Hsu (1979)

Species of tree

Quercus ningangensis is an Asian species of trees in the beech family Fagaceae. It is native to southern China (Guangxi, Hunan, Jiangxi). It is placed in subgenus Cerris, section Cyclobalanopsis.

Quercus ningangensis is a large tree up to 30 meters tall. Leaves can be as much as 18 cm long.
