= Quercus neoplatyphylla =

Scientific classification
- Kingdom: Plantae
- Clade: Embryophytes
- Clade: Tracheophytes
- Clade: Spermatophytes
- Clade: Angiosperms
- Clade: Eudicots
- Clade: Rosids
- Order: Fagales
- Family: Fagaceae
- Genus: Quercus
- Subgenus: Quercus subg. Quercus
- Section: Quercus sect. Quercus
- Species: Q. neoplatyphylla

Binomial name
- Quercus neoplatyphylla A.Camus

Synonyms
- Quercus nanchititlensis B.M.Barthol. & Almeda; Quercus platyphylla E.F.Warb.

Species of flowering plant

Quercus neoplatyphylla is a species of oak. It is a tree native to central and southwestern Mexico.

The species was described by Aimée Antoinette Camus in 1942. Some authorities consider it a synonym of Quercus magnoliifolia.
