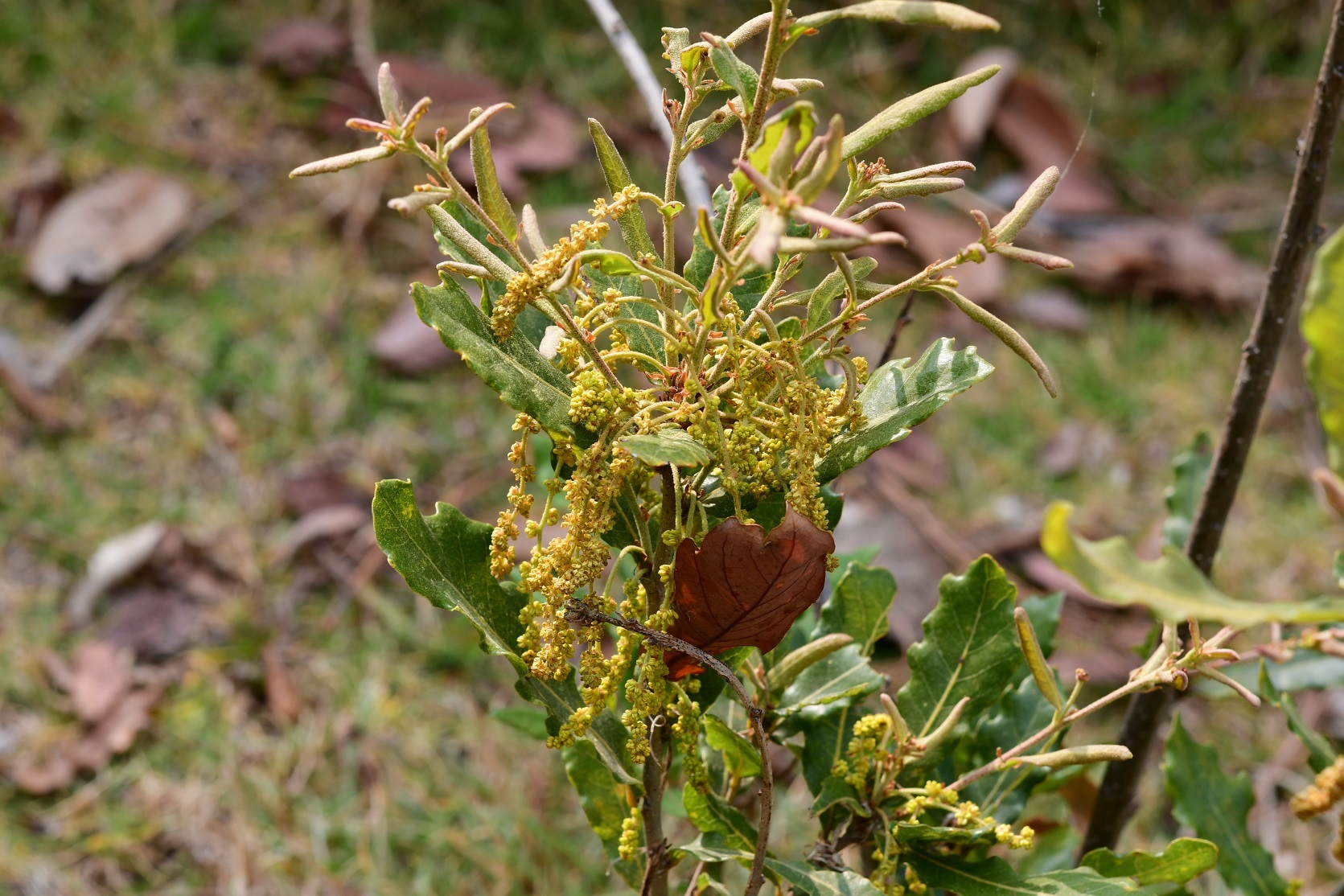

Conservation status
- Least Concern (IUCN 3.1)

Scientific classification
- Kingdom: Plantae
- Clade: Tracheophytes
- Clade: Angiosperms
- Clade: Eudicots
- Clade: Rosids
- Order: Fagales
- Family: Fagaceae
- Genus: Quercus
- Subgenus: Quercus subg. Quercus
- Section: Quercus sect. Quercus
- Species: Q. sebifera

Binomial name
- Quercus sebifera Trel.

Synonyms
- Quercus ceripes Trel.; Quercus schenckiana Trel.; Quercus sebifera f. comitanensis Trel.; Quercus trinidadensis C.H.Mull.

= Quercus sebifera =

Species of oak tree

Quercus sebifera is a species of oak. It is native to eastern and southern Mexico, where it occurs in Chiapas, Oaxaca, Puebla, Hidalgo, Querétaro, Tamaulipas, and Nuevo León.
