= Quercus cualensis =

Conservation status
- Endangered (IUCN 3.1)

Scientific classification
- Kingdom: Plantae
- Clade: Embryophytes
- Clade: Tracheophytes
- Clade: Spermatophytes
- Clade: Angiosperms
- Clade: Eudicots
- Clade: Rosids
- Order: Fagales
- Family: Fagaceae
- Genus: Quercus
- Subgenus: Quercus subg. Quercus
- Section: Quercus sect. Lobatae
- Species: Q. cualensis

Binomial name
- Quercus cualensis L.M.González

Species of oak tree

Quercus cualensis is a rare species of oak. It has been found only in a small region in the State of Jalisco in western Mexico, in the Sierra el Cuale mountains south of Puerto Vallarta.

== Description ==
Quercus cualensis is an evergreen tree up to 15 metres (49 feet) tall, with a trunk as much as 30 centimetres (12 inches) in diameter. The leaves are thin, flat, and hairless, narrowly lance-shaped, up to 15 cm long.
