= Quercus shennongii =

Conservation status
- Data Deficient (IUCN 3.1)

Scientific classification
- Kingdom: Plantae
- Clade: Embryophytes
- Clade: Tracheophytes
- Clade: Spermatophytes
- Clade: Angiosperms
- Clade: Eudicots
- Clade: Rosids
- Order: Fagales
- Family: Fagaceae
- Genus: Quercus
- Subgenus: Quercus subg. Quercus
- Section: Quercus sect. Quercus
- Species: Q. shennongii

Binomial name
- Quercus shennongii C.C.Huang & S.H.Fu

Synonyms
- Cyclobalanopsis shennongii (C.C.Huang & S.H.Fu) Y.C.Hsu & H.Wei Jen

Species of oak tree

Quercus shennongii is a species of oak in the section Quercus sect. Quercus. It is a native to southeastern China. There is very little information about Quercus shennongii's population, habitat, or threats, which lead the IUCN to list it as Data Deficient. It is usually a tree or shrub.
