= Quercus hintonii =

Conservation status
- Endangered (IUCN 3.1)

Scientific classification
- Kingdom: Plantae
- Clade: Tracheophytes
- Clade: Angiosperms
- Clade: Eudicots
- Clade: Rosids
- Order: Fagales
- Family: Fagaceae
- Genus: Quercus
- Subgenus: Quercus subg. Quercus
- Section: Quercus sect. Lobatae
- Species: Q. hintonii

Binomial name
- Quercus hintonii E.F.Warb.

Synonyms
- Quercus apiophylla E.F.Warb.; Quercus ochroesthes E.F.Warb.; Quercus sagata E.F.Warb.

Species of oak tree

Quercus hintonii is a rare species of oak. It is endemic to the central Mexican State of Mexico.

It is a deciduous tree growing up to 15 metres (49 feet) tall with a trunk as much as 50 centimetres (20 inches) in diameter. The leaves are thick and leathery, up to 21 cm long, elliptical or egg-shaped, very often with no teeth or lobes but sometimes with a few pointed teeth.

The species is threatened by habitat loss.
