= Quercus mexiae =

Conservation status
- Data Deficient (IUCN 3.1)

Scientific classification
- Kingdom: Plantae
- Clade: Embryophytes
- Clade: Tracheophytes
- Clade: Spermatophytes
- Clade: Angiosperms
- Clade: Eudicots
- Clade: Rosids
- Order: Fagales
- Family: Fagaceae
- Genus: Quercus
- Subgenus: Quercus subg. Quercus
- Section: Quercus sect. Lobatae
- Species: Q. mexiae

Binomial name
- Quercus mexiae L.M.González

Species of flowering plant

Quercus mexiae is a species of oak. It is a tree endemic to the state of Jalisco in western Mexico. It grows in montane pine–oak forests.

The species was described by Luz Maria González Villarreal in 2018.
