= Quercus tiaoloshanica =

Conservation status
- Endangered (IUCN 3.1)

Scientific classification
- Kingdom: Plantae
- Clade: Embryophytes
- Clade: Tracheophytes
- Clade: Spermatophytes
- Clade: Angiosperms
- Clade: Eudicots
- Clade: Rosids
- Order: Fagales
- Family: Fagaceae
- Genus: Quercus
- Subgenus: Quercus subg. Cerris
- Section: Quercus sect. Cyclobalanopsis
- Species: Q. tiaoloshanica

Binomial name
- Quercus tiaoloshanica Chun & W.C.Ko (1958)

Synonyms
- Cyclobalanopsis tiaoloshanica (Chun & W.C.Ko) Y.C.Hsu & H.Wei Jen (1979)

Species of oak tree

Quercus tiaoloshanica is a species of oak. It is a tree endemic to the island of Hainan. It is native montane forests between 900 and 1,400 metres (3,000 and 4,600 ft) elevation. It is recorded from only three locations, but its population, habitat, and ecology are not well understood.
