= Quercus yongchuniana =

Scientific classification
- Kingdom: Plantae
- Clade: Embryophytes
- Clade: Tracheophytes
- Clade: Angiosperms
- Clade: Eudicots
- Clade: Rosids
- Order: Fagales
- Family: Fagaceae
- Genus: Quercus
- Subgenus: Quercus subg. Cerris
- Section: Quercus sect. Cyclobalanopsis
- Species: Q. yongchuniana

Binomial name
- Quercus yongchuniana Z.K.Zhou

Synonyms
- Cyclobalanopsis longifolia Y.C.Hsu & Q.Z.Dong

Species of flowering plant

Quercus yongchuniana is a species of oak. It is a tree endemic to Yunnan Province in south-central China.

The species was described by Zhe Kun Zhou in 1998. Some authorities consider it a synonym of Quercus lungmaiensis.
