= Quercus hondae =

Conservation status
- Vulnerable (IUCN 3.1)

Scientific classification
- Kingdom: Plantae
- Clade: Tracheophytes
- Clade: Angiosperms
- Clade: Eudicots
- Clade: Rosids
- Order: Fagales
- Family: Fagaceae
- Genus: Quercus
- Subgenus: Quercus subg. Cerris
- Section: Quercus sect. Cyclobalanopsis
- Species: Q. hondae

Binomial name
- Quercus hondae Makino

Synonyms
- Cyclobalanopsis hondae (Makino) Schottky

Species of oak tree

Quercus hondae is a species of tree in the beech family Fagaceae. It has been found on Kyushu Island in southern Japan. It is placed in subgenus Cerris, section Cyclobalanopsis.

Quercus hondae is an evergreen tree with dark gray bark. Twigs are dark brown and hairless. Leaves can be as much as 14 cm long, thick and leathery.
