= Quercus apiculata =

Scientific classification
- Kingdom: Plantae
- Clade: Embryophytes
- Clade: Tracheophytes
- Clade: Spermatophytes
- Clade: Angiosperms
- Clade: Eudicots
- Clade: Rosids
- Order: Fagales
- Family: Fagaceae
- Genus: Quercus
- Subgenus: Quercus subg. Cerris
- Section: Quercus sect. Cerris
- Species: Q. apiculata

Binomial name
- Quercus apiculata Djav.-Khoie

Species of flowering plant

Quercus apiculata is a species of oak. It is a tree endemic to northwestern Iran. It grows in the northern Zagros Mountains of Kurdistan Province, in forest at 1280 metres elevation.

The species was described by Karim Djavanchir-Khoie in a 1967 thesis, which was deemed not effectively published per Article 30.9 of the International Code of Nomenclature for algae, fungi, and plants. It was validated by publication in the Turkish Journal of Botany in 2018.
