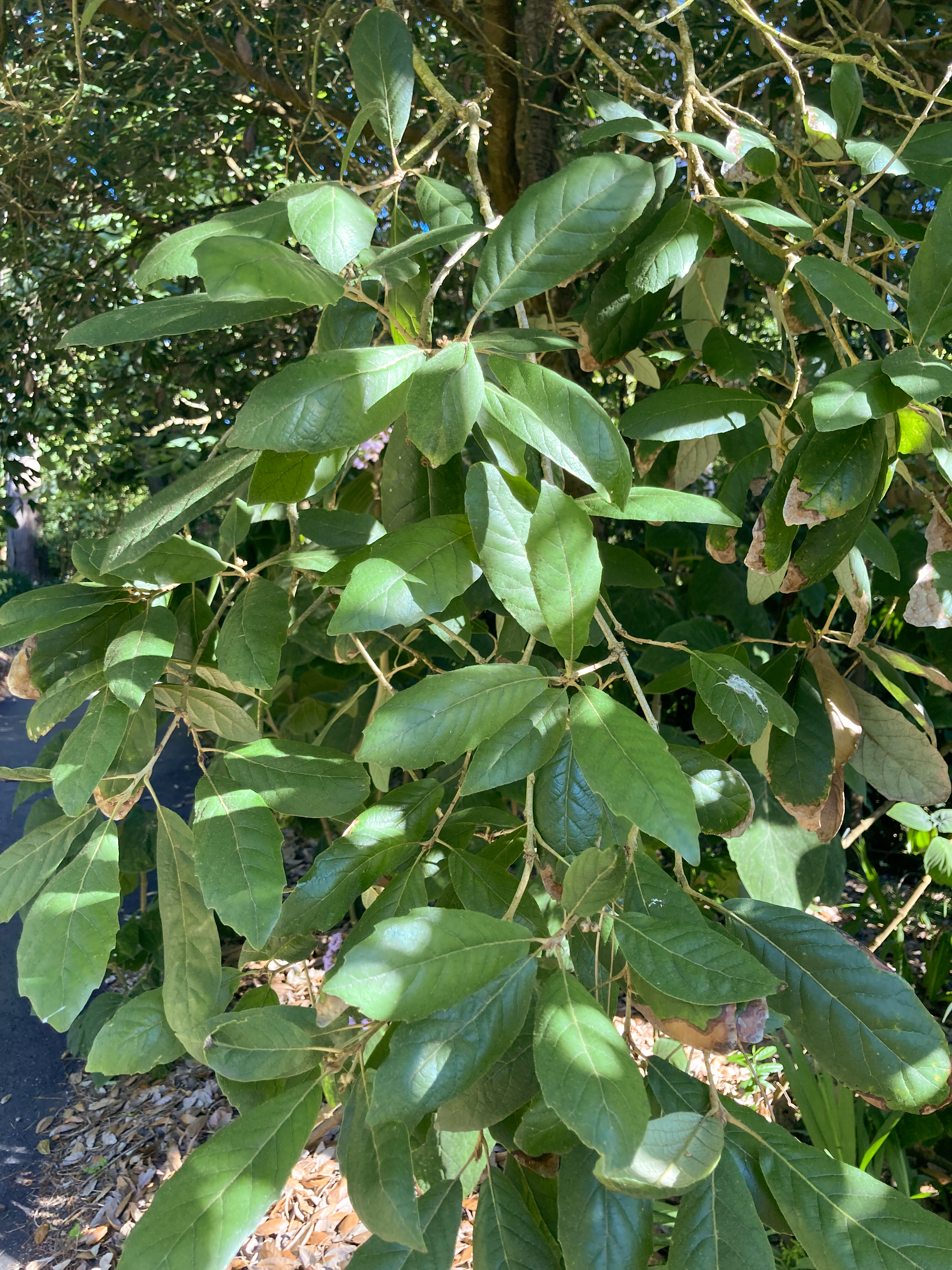

Conservation status
- Vulnerable (IUCN 3.1)

Scientific classification
- Kingdom: Plantae
- Clade: Embryophytes
- Clade: Tracheophytes
- Clade: Spermatophytes
- Clade: Angiosperms
- Clade: Eudicots
- Clade: Rosids
- Order: Fagales
- Family: Fagaceae
- Genus: Quercus
- Subgenus: Quercus subg. Quercus
- Section: Quercus sect. Quercus
- Species: Q. vicentensis

Binomial name
- Quercus vicentensis Trel.

Synonyms
- Quercus comasaguana Trel.; Quercus siltepecana Matuda

= Quercus vicentensis =

Species of plant

Quercus vicentensis is a species of oak tree in the family Fagaceae, native to southern Mexico and northern Central America. It is placed in section Quercus.

== Distribution and habitat ==
Quercus vicentensis is endemic to forest habitats in southern Mexico (Chiapas, Jalisco, Guerrero, Michoacán, and Oaxaca states), El Salvador, Guatemala and Honduras.

It grows in humid montane forests between 1,200–1,900 metres (3,900–6,200 ft) elevation.

== Conservation ==
Quercus vicentensis is threatened with habitat loss from extensive deforestation throughout its range.

== Gallery ==
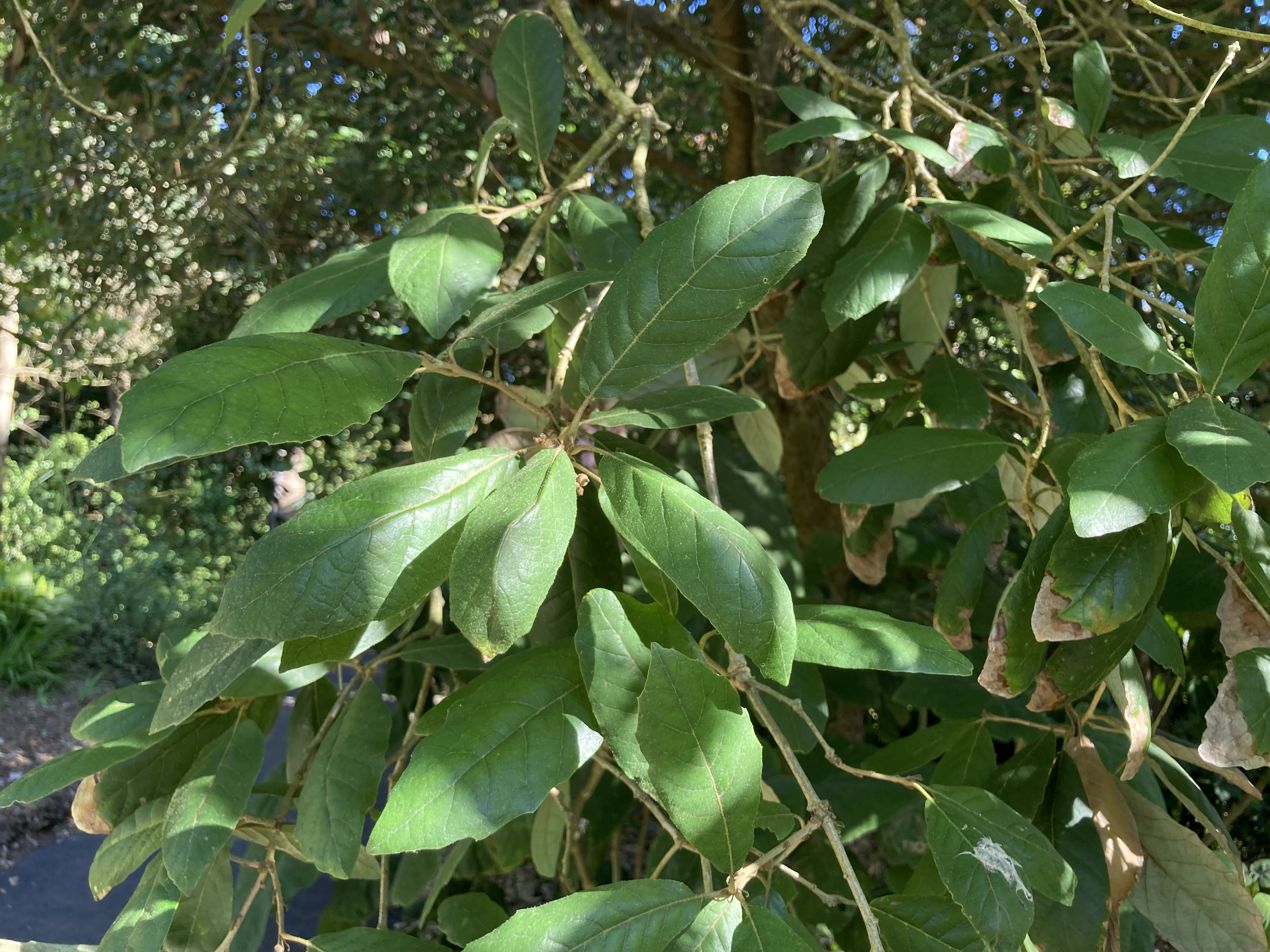
The leaves

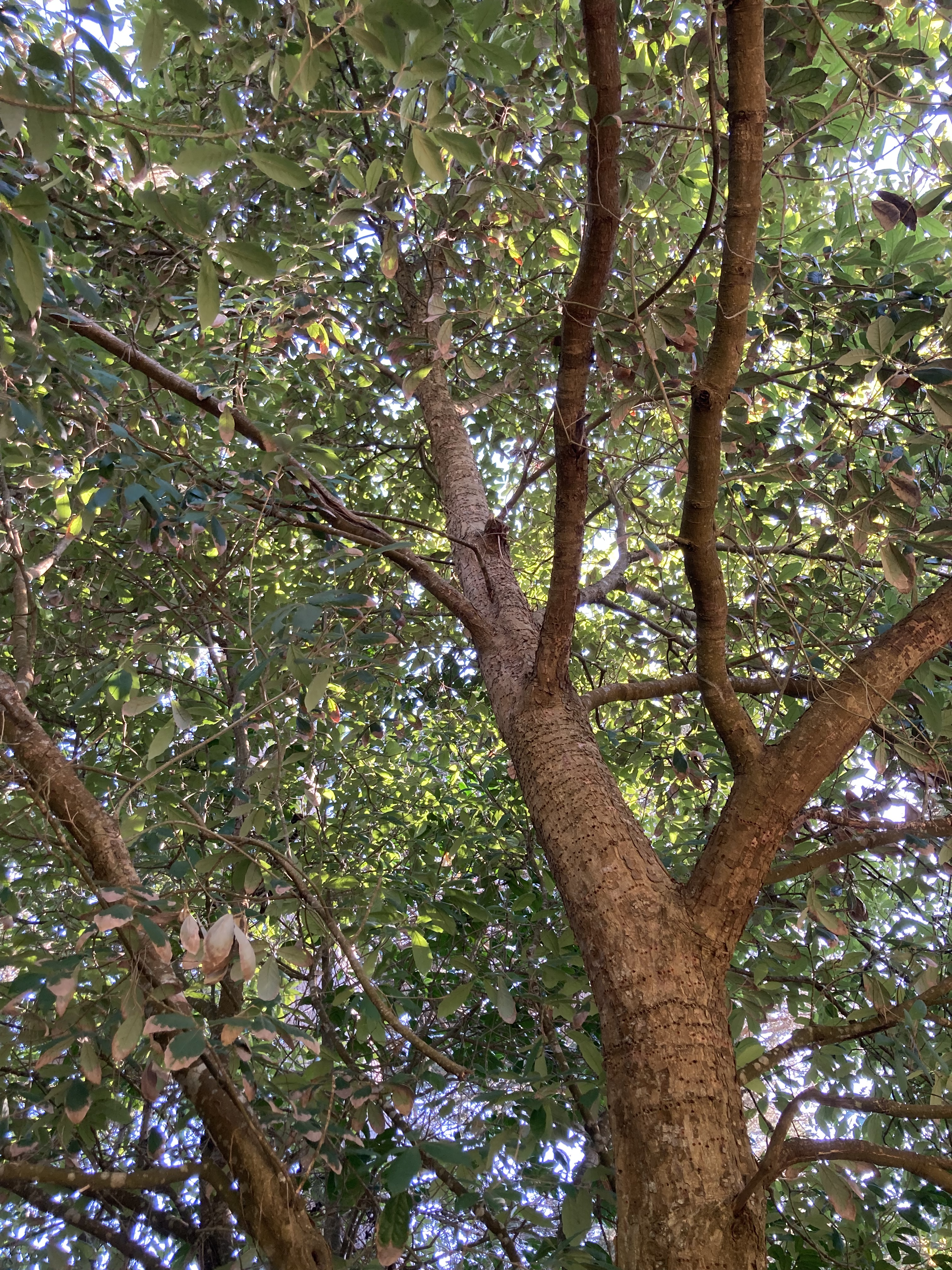
Looking up through the branches

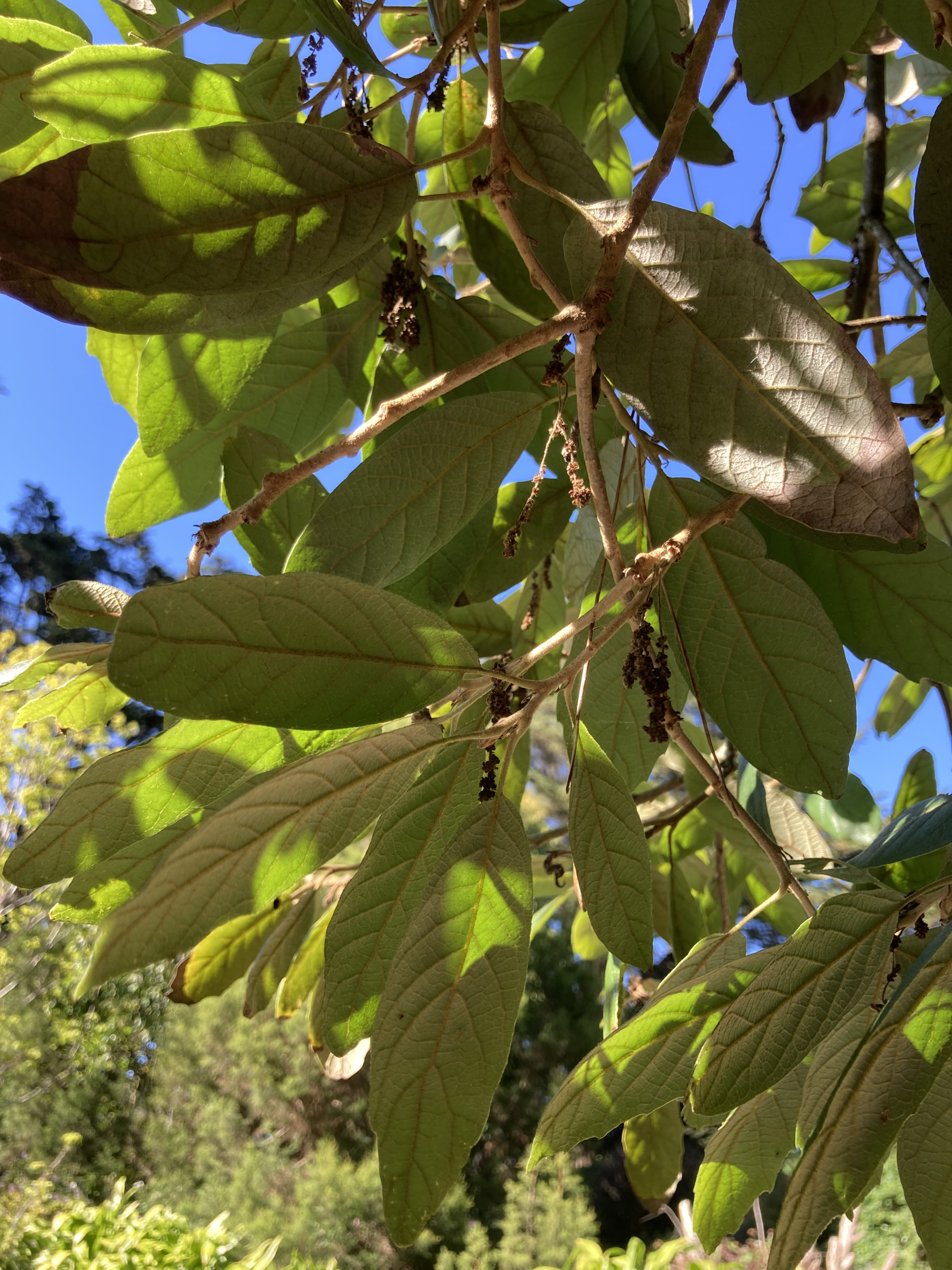
The back of the leaves

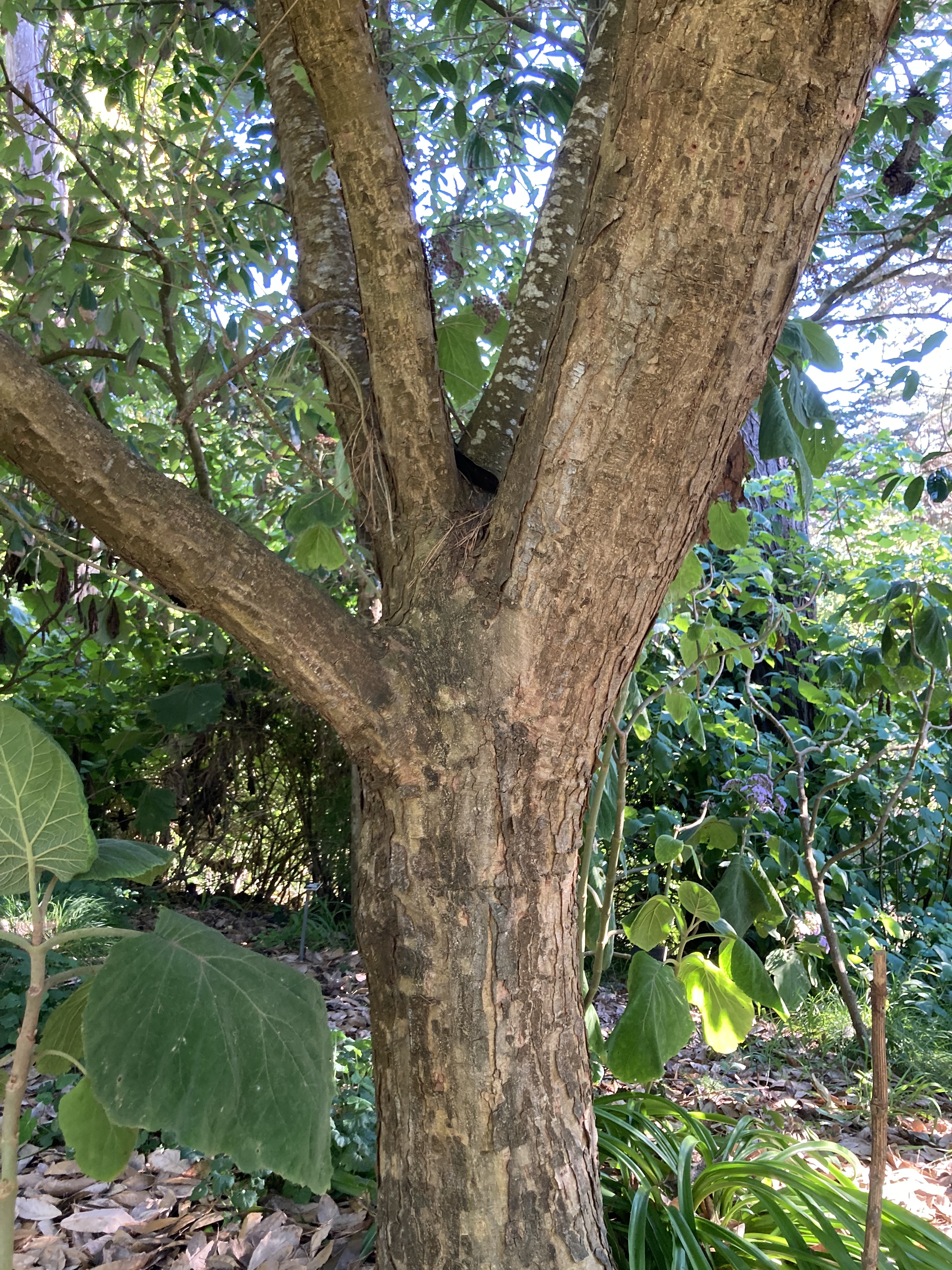
The bark
