= Quercus barrancana =

Conservation status
- Data Deficient (IUCN 3.1)

Scientific classification
- Kingdom: Plantae
- Clade: Embryophytes
- Clade: Tracheophytes
- Clade: Spermatophytes
- Clade: Angiosperms
- Clade: Eudicots
- Clade: Rosids
- Order: Fagales
- Family: Fagaceae
- Genus: Quercus
- Subgenus: Quercus subg. Quercus
- Section: Quercus sect. Quercus
- Species: Q. barrancana

Binomial name
- Quercus barrancana Spellenb.

Species of flowering plant

Quercus barrancana is a species of oak. It is a shrub or small tree native to the state of Chihuahua in northern Mexico. It typically grows as a shrub, and occasionally a small tree with one or several trunks, from one to five meters tall. It is native to dry, rocky slopes in steep-walled rocky canyons (barrancas) on the western slope of the Sierra Madre Occidental from 1,300 to 2,115 meters elevation.

The species was first described by Richard William Spellenberg in 2014.
