= Quercus daimingshanensis =

Conservation status
- Endangered (IUCN 3.1)

Scientific classification
- Kingdom: Plantae
- Clade: Embryophytes
- Clade: Tracheophytes
- Clade: Spermatophytes
- Clade: Angiosperms
- Clade: Eudicots
- Clade: Rosids
- Order: Fagales
- Family: Fagaceae
- Genus: Quercus
- Subgenus: Quercus subg. Cerris
- Section: Quercus sect. Cyclobalanopsis
- Species: Q. daimingshanensis

Binomial name
- Quercus daimingshanensis (S.K.Lee) C.C.Huang

Synonyms
- Cyclobalanopsis daimingshanensis S.K.Lee

Species of tree

Quercus daimingshanensis is a rare Asian species of trees in the beech family. It has been found only in a small region of southern China, in the Daming Shan region of the Province of Guangxi. It is placed in subgenus Cerris, section Cyclobalanopsis.

Quercus daimingshanensis is a tree up to 15 meters tall with hairless twigs and leaves as much as 7 cm long.
