= Quercus shingjenensis =

Conservation status
- Data Deficient (IUCN 3.1)

Scientific classification
- Kingdom: Plantae
- Clade: Embryophytes
- Clade: Tracheophytes
- Clade: Spermatophytes
- Clade: Angiosperms
- Clade: Eudicots
- Clade: Rosids
- Order: Fagales
- Family: Fagaceae
- Genus: Quercus
- Subgenus: Quercus subg. Quercus
- Section: Quercus sect. Quercus
- Species: Q. shingjenensis

Binomial name
- Quercus shingjenensis Y.T.Chang

Species of flowering plant

Quercus shingjenensis is a species of oak. It is a tree native to Guizhou Province in south-central China. Little is known about the species' distribution, population, or habitat, and the IUCN Red List assesses the species as Data Deficient.

The species was described by Yong Tian Chang in 1966.
