= Quercus floccosa =

Scientific classification
- Kingdom: Plantae
- Clade: Embryophytes
- Clade: Tracheophytes
- Clade: Angiosperms
- Clade: Eudicots
- Clade: Rosids
- Order: Fagales
- Family: Fagaceae
- Genus: Quercus
- Subgenus: Quercus subg. Quercus
- Section: Quercus sect. Lobatae
- Species: Q. floccosa

Binomial name
- Quercus floccosa Liebm.

Species of flowering plant

Quercus floccosa is a species of oak. It is a tree endemic to the state of Veracruz in eastern Mexico. It is known from Pico de Orizaba where it grows from 2600 to 3300 meters elevation.

The species was described by Frederik Liebmann in 1854.
