= Quercus elevaticostata =

Conservation status
- Data Deficient (IUCN 3.1)

Scientific classification
- Kingdom: Plantae
- Clade: Embryophytes
- Clade: Tracheophytes
- Clade: Spermatophytes
- Clade: Angiosperms
- Clade: Eudicots
- Clade: Rosids
- Order: Fagales
- Family: Fagaceae
- Genus: Quercus
- Subgenus: Quercus subg. Cerris
- Section: Quercus sect. Cyclobalanopsis
- Species: Q. elevaticostata

Binomial name
- Quercus elevaticostata (Q.F.Zheng) C.C.Huang 1992

Synonyms
- Cyclobalanopsis elevaticostata Q.F.Zheng (1979)

Species of tree

Quercus elevaticostata is an uncommon species of tree in the beech family. It has been found only in southern China, in the province of Fujian. It is placed in subgenus Cerris, section Cyclobalanopsis.

Quercus elevaticostata is a tree up to 20 meters tall with purple-brown twigs plus leaves as much as 15 cm long.
