= Quercus hainanica =

Conservation status
- Endangered (IUCN 3.1)

Scientific classification
- Kingdom: Plantae
- Clade: Embryophytes
- Clade: Tracheophytes
- Clade: Angiosperms
- Clade: Eudicots
- Clade: Rosids
- Order: Fagales
- Family: Fagaceae
- Genus: Quercus
- Subgenus: Quercus subg. Cerris
- Section: Quercus sect. Cyclobalanopsis
- Species: Q. hainanica

Binomial name
- Quercus hainanica C.C.Huang & Y.T.Chang

Synonyms
- Cyclobalanopsis litoralis Chun & P.C.Tam ex Y.C.Hsu & H.Wei Jen; Cyclobalanopsis macrocalyx var. litoralis (Chun & P.C.Tam ex Y.C.Hsu & H.Wei Jen) M.Deng & Z.K.Zhou; Quercus obconica Z.K.Zhou, nom. illeg. superfl.

Species of flowering plant

Quercus hainanica is a species of oak. It is a tree endemic to the island province of Hainan in southern China. It grows in lower montane forest from 700 to 900 metres elevation.
