= Quercus dinghuensis =

Conservation status
- Critically Endangered (IUCN 3.1)

Scientific classification
- Kingdom: Plantae
- Clade: Embryophytes
- Clade: Tracheophytes
- Clade: Spermatophytes
- Clade: Angiosperms
- Clade: Eudicots
- Clade: Rosids
- Order: Fagales
- Family: Fagaceae
- Genus: Quercus
- Subgenus: Quercus subg. Cerris
- Section: Quercus sect. Cyclobalanopsis
- Species: Q. dinghuensis

Binomial name
- Quercus dinghuensis C.C.Huang

Synonyms
- Cyclobalanopsis dinghuensis (C.C.Huang) Y.C.Hsu & H.Wei Jen

Species of tree

Quercus dinghuensis is a rare species of tree in the beech family. It has been found only in a small region in southern China, in the Dinghu Shan area in the province of Guangdong. It is placed in subgenus Cerris, section Cyclobalanopsis.

Quercus dinghuensis is a small tree up to 8 meters tall with woolly, grayish-brown twigs, and leaves as much as 9 cm long.
