= Quercus shangxiensis =

Conservation status
- Data Deficient (IUCN 3.1)

Scientific classification
- Kingdom: Plantae
- Clade: Embryophytes
- Clade: Tracheophytes
- Clade: Spermatophytes
- Clade: Angiosperms
- Clade: Eudicots
- Clade: Rosids
- Order: Fagales
- Family: Fagaceae
- Genus: Quercus
- Subgenus: Quercus subg. Cerris
- Section: Quercus sect. Ilex
- Species: Q. shangxiensis

Binomial name
- Quercus shangxiensis Z.K.Zhou

Synonyms
- Quercus lanceolata S.Z.Qu & W.H.Zhang, nom. illeg. homonym. post.

Species of flowering plant

Quercus shangxiensis is a species of oak. It is a tree native to Shanxi Province in central China. Little is known about the distribution, population, or habitat of the species, and the IUCN Red List assesses the species as Data Deficient.

The species was described by Zhe Kun Zhou in 1998.
