= Quercus albicaulis =

Conservation status
- Critically endangered, possibly extinct in the wild (IUCN 3.1)

Scientific classification
- Kingdom: Plantae
- Clade: Embryophytes
- Clade: Tracheophytes
- Clade: Spermatophytes
- Clade: Angiosperms
- Clade: Eudicots
- Clade: Rosids
- Order: Fagales
- Family: Fagaceae
- Genus: Quercus
- Subgenus: Quercus subg. Cerris
- Section: Quercus sect. Cyclobalanopsis
- Species: Q. albicaulis

Binomial name
- Quercus albicaulis Chun & W.C.Ko

Synonyms
- Cyclobalanopsis albicaulis (Chun & W.C.Ko) Y.C.Hsu & H.Wei Jen

Species of oak tree

Quercus albicaulis is a rare Chinese species of oak. It is a tree found only on the island of Hainan in southern China.

Quercus albicaulis is a large tree up to 30 m tall with white twigs and leaves as much as 18 cm long.

It is placed in subgenus Cerris, section Cyclobalanopsis.
