= Quercus fuliginosa =

Conservation status
- Data Deficient (IUCN 3.1)

Scientific classification
- Kingdom: Plantae
- Clade: Embryophytes
- Clade: Tracheophytes
- Clade: Spermatophytes
- Clade: Angiosperms
- Clade: Eudicots
- Clade: Rosids
- Order: Fagales
- Family: Fagaceae
- Genus: Quercus
- Subgenus: Quercus subg. Cerris
- Section: Quercus sect. Cyclobalanopsis
- Species: Q. fuliginosa

Binomial name
- Quercus fuliginosa Chun & W.C.Ko (1958)

Synonyms
- Cyclobalanopsis fuliginosa (Chun & W.C.Ko) Y.Y.Luo & R.J.Wang (2007)

Species of oak

Quercus fuliginosa is a species of oak. It is a tree endemic to the island of Hainan in southern China. Little is known about the species' population, habitat, or ecology.
