= Quercus fimbriata =

Conservation status
- Critically Endangered (IUCN 3.1)

Scientific classification
- Kingdom: Plantae
- Clade: Embryophytes
- Clade: Tracheophytes
- Clade: Spermatophytes
- Clade: Angiosperms
- Clade: Eudicots
- Clade: Rosids
- Order: Fagales
- Family: Fagaceae
- Genus: Quercus
- Subgenus: Quercus subg. Cerris
- Section: Quercus sect. Ilex
- Species: Q. fimbriata

Binomial name
- Quercus fimbriata Y.C.Hsu & H.W.Jen

Species of flowering plant

Quercus fimbriata is a species of oak. It is a tree native to western Sichuan and northwestern Yunnan provinces in south-central China. It grows in subtropical broadleaf evergreen forests on semi-shady slopes from 500 to 2,800 metres elevation. Many locations are known only herbarium collections, some of which are over 100 years old and have undergone significant urbanization or land conversion since. The current population is estimated at fewer than 50 individuals, and the IUCN Red List assesses the species as Critically Endangered.

The species was described by Yung Chun Hsu and Hsien Wei Jen in 1976.
