= Quercus tungmaiensis =

Conservation status
- Endangered (IUCN 3.1)

Scientific classification
- Kingdom: Plantae
- Clade: Embryophytes
- Clade: Tracheophytes
- Clade: Spermatophytes
- Clade: Angiosperms
- Clade: Eudicots
- Clade: Rosids
- Order: Fagales
- Family: Fagaceae
- Genus: Quercus
- Subgenus: Quercus subg. Cerris
- Section: Quercus sect. Ilex
- Species: Q. tungmaiensis

Binomial name
- Quercus tungmaiensis Y.T.Chang

Species of flowering plant

Quercus tungmaiensis is a species of oak. It is a tree native to Arunachal Pradesh in northeastern India and southeastern Tibet. It grows in subtropical montane moist forests from 1,900 to 2,600 metres elevation.

The species was described by Yong Tian Chang in 1966.
