= Quercus meihuashanensis =

Scientific classification
- Kingdom: Plantae
- Clade: Embryophytes
- Clade: Tracheophytes
- Clade: Angiosperms
- Clade: Eudicots
- Clade: Rosids
- Order: Fagales
- Family: Fagaceae
- Genus: Quercus
- Subgenus: Quercus subg. Cerris
- Section: Quercus sect. Cyclobalanopsis
- Species: Q. meihuashanensis

Binomial name
- Quercus meihuashanensis (Q.F.Zheng) C.C.Huang

Synonyms
- Cyclobalanopsis meihuashanensis Q.F.Zheng

Species of flowering plant

Quercus meihuashanensis is a species of oak. It is a tree endemic to Fujian Province in southeastern China.

The species was first described as Cyclobalanopsis meihuashanensis by Qing Fang Zheng in 1979. In 1992 Cheng Chiu Huang placed the species in genus Quercus as Q. meihuashanensis. Some authorities consider it a synonym of Quercus arbutifolia.
