= Quercus schultzei =

Scientific classification
- Kingdom: Plantae
- Clade: Embryophytes
- Clade: Tracheophytes
- Clade: Angiosperms
- Clade: Eudicots
- Clade: Rosids
- Order: Fagales
- Family: Fagaceae
- Genus: Quercus
- Species: Q. schultzei

Binomial name
- Quercus schultzei Trel.

Species of flowering plant

Quercus schultzei is a species of oak. It is a tree native to Guerrero state in southwestern Mexico, where it grows in deserts and dry shrublands.

The species was described by William Trelease in 1934.
