= Quercus toxicodendrifolia =

Conservation status
- Data Deficient (IUCN 3.1)

Scientific classification
- Kingdom: Plantae
- Clade: Embryophytes
- Clade: Tracheophytes
- Clade: Spermatophytes
- Clade: Angiosperms
- Clade: Eudicots
- Clade: Rosids
- Order: Fagales
- Family: Fagaceae
- Genus: Quercus
- Subgenus: Quercus subg. Quercus
- Section: Quercus sect. Quercus
- Species: Q. toxicodendrifolia

Binomial name
- Quercus toxicodendrifolia Trel.

Species of flowering plant

Quercus toxicodendrifolia is a species of oak. It is a tree native to eastern, central, and southern Mexico, ranging from Hidalgo to Chiapas. In Hidalgo it grows in montane forests in the Sierra Madre Oriental. Its elevational range, habitat, population, and distribution are poorly understood, and the IUCN Red List assesses the species as Data Deficient.

The species was described by William Trelease in 1924.
