= Quercus honbaensis =

Conservation status
- Critically Endangered (IUCN 3.1)

Scientific classification
- Kingdom: Plantae
- Clade: Embryophytes
- Clade: Tracheophytes
- Clade: Spermatophytes
- Clade: Angiosperms
- Clade: Eudicots
- Clade: Rosids
- Order: Fagales
- Family: Fagaceae
- Genus: Quercus
- Subgenus: Quercus subg. Cerris
- Section: Quercus sect. Cyclobalanopsis
- Species: Q. honbaensis

Binomial name
- Quercus honbaensis H.T.Binh, Tagane & Yahara

Species of flowering plant

Quercus honbaensis is a species of oak. It is a tree endemic to Vietnam. It is known from a single location in Khánh Hòa province, where it grows in tropical evergreen moist forest at 225 metres elevation.
