= Quercus liboensis =

Conservation status
- Endangered (IUCN 3.1)

Scientific classification
- Kingdom: Plantae
- Clade: Embryophytes
- Clade: Tracheophytes
- Clade: Spermatophytes
- Clade: Angiosperms
- Clade: Eudicots
- Clade: Rosids
- Order: Fagales
- Family: Fagaceae
- Genus: Quercus
- Subgenus: Quercus subg. Cerris
- Section: Quercus sect. Cyclobalanopsis
- Species: Q. liboensis

Binomial name
- Quercus liboensis Z.K.Zhou

Synonyms
- Cyclobalanopsis pseudoglauca Y.K.Li & X.M.Wang

Species of flowering plant

Quercus liboensis is a species of oak. It is a tree endemic to Guizhou Province in south-central China. It is known from four widely scattered sites, where it grows in mixed montane forests.
