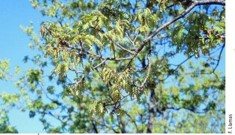

Conservation status
- Data Deficient (IUCN 3.1)

Scientific classification
- Kingdom: Plantae
- Clade: Embryophytes
- Clade: Tracheophytes
- Clade: Spermatophytes
- Clade: Angiosperms
- Clade: Eudicots
- Clade: Rosids
- Order: Fagales
- Family: Fagaceae
- Genus: Quercus
- Subgenus: Quercus subg. Quercus
- Section: Quercus sect. Quercus
- Species: Q. pauciradiata

Binomial name
- Quercus pauciradiata Penas, Llamas, Pérez Morales & Acedo

= Quercus pauciradiata =

Species of flowering plant

Quercus pauciradiata is a species of oak. It is a shrub or tree native to northeastern León in northern Spain. It is known from three populations, where it grows mainly in mountain forests with other oak species, and occasionally in birch forest or riparian forest, from 920 to 1,320 metres elevation.

The species was described by Angel Penas, Felix Llamas, Carmen Pérez Morales, and Carmen Acedo Casado in 1997.
