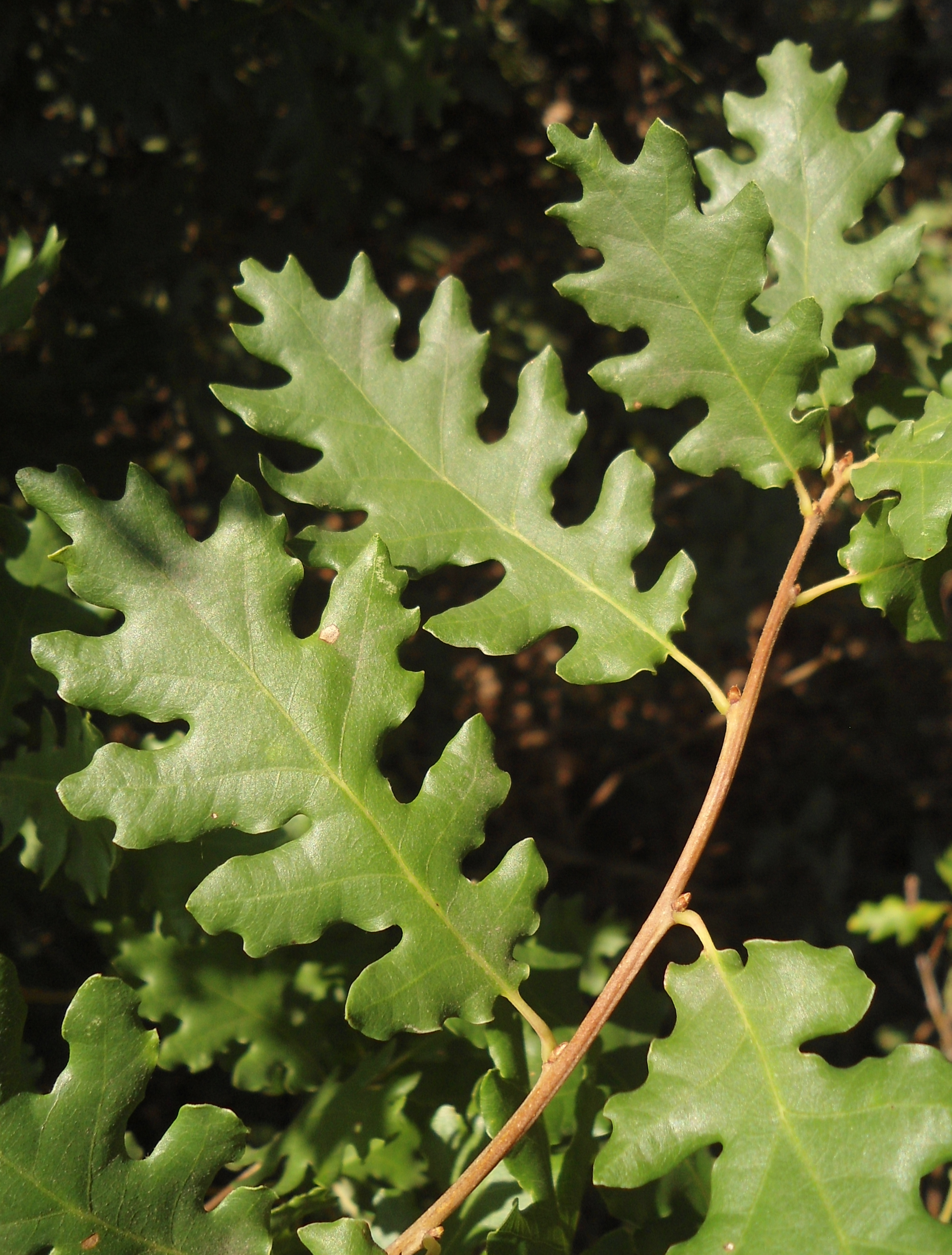

Scientific classification
- Kingdom: Plantae
- Clade: Embryophytes
- Clade: Tracheophytes
- Clade: Spermatophytes
- Clade: Angiosperms
- Clade: Eudicots
- Clade: Rosids
- Order: Fagales
- Family: Fagaceae
- Genus: Quercus
- Species: Q. aurea

Binomial name
- Quercus aurea Wierzb.

Synonyms
- Synonymy: Quercus banatus P.Kučera (2018), nom. illeg. superfl.; Quercus dalechampii subf. acutilobata Mátyás; Quercus dalechampii var. angulata Lojac.; Quercus dalechampii f. apatini (Erdesi) Erdesi; Quercus dalechampii var. aurea (Wierzb.) Mátyás; Quercus dalechampii subf. aureoacutilobata Mátyás; Quercus dalechampii var. breviloba Lojac.; Quercus dalechampii var. cochleata Lojac.; Quercus dalechampii subf. crispatolobata Mátyás; Quercus dalechampii var. grandifolia Lojac.; Quercus dalechampii f. lancifolia Mátyás; Quercus dalechampii subf. lobulata Mátyás; Quercus dalechampii subf. lobulosa Mátyás; Quercus dalechampii subf. lobulosissima Mátyás; Quercus dalechampii f. macroloba (Borbás) Mátyás; Quercus dalechampii var. microbalana Lojac.; Quercus dalechampii var. pallida Lojac.; Quercus dalechampii f. piersii Mátyás; Quercus dalechampii var. pulchella Lojac.; Quercus dalechampii f. rubens Mátyás; Quercus dalechampii subf. semiaurea Mátyás; Quercus frainetto var. aurea (Wierzb.) Nyman; Quercus × kanitziana f. apatini Erdesi; Quercus robur var. aurea (Wierzb.) Rochel; Quercus robur var. cuneata A.DC.; Quercus sessiliflora var. aurea (Wierzb.) A.DC.; Quercus sessiliflora var. macroloba Borbás; Quercus sessilis var. aurea (Wierzb.) Schur; Quercus sessilis var. macroloba (Borbás) Borbás; Quercus strigosa Wierzb. ex Rochel; Quercus toza var. aurea (Wierzb.) Nyman

= Quercus aurea =

Species of flowering plant

Quercus aurea is a species of oak. It is a tree native to southeastern and south-central Europe, ranging from Italy, including Sardinia and Sicily, through the Balkan Peninsula to Greece and Romania, and north to Austria, Hungary, and Slovakia.

The species includes populations formerly grouped under Quercus dalechampii. In 2012 Di Pietro et al. concluded that the name Q. dalechampii had been inconsistently applied, and designated a new lectotype. Q. dalechampii as circumscribed by Di Pietro et al. is endemic to southern Italy, and excludes the populations in southeastern Europe. The name Quercus aurea, first published by Piotr Pawlus Wierzbicki in 1835, was revived for the populations excluded from di Pietro's recircumscription. Peter Kučera considered Q. aurea an invalid name, and in 2018 proposed the new name Q. banatus for the species. As of July 2026 Plants of the World Online accepts Q. aurea as the valid name.
