= Quercus globosa =

Scientific classification
- Kingdom: Plantae
- Clade: Embryophytes
- Clade: Tracheophytes
- Clade: Spermatophytes
- Clade: Angiosperms
- Clade: Eudicots
- Clade: Rosids
- Order: Fagales
- Family: Fagaceae
- Genus: Quercus
- Subgenus: Quercus subg. Cerris
- Section: Quercus sect. Cyclobalanopsis
- Species: Q. globosa

Binomial name
- Quercus globosa (T.P.Lin & T.S.Liu) J.C.Liao

Synonyms
- Cyclobalanopsis globosa T.P.Lin & T.S.Liu; Cyclobalanopsis globosa f. chiapautaiensis (J.C.Liao) J.C.Liao; Quercus globosa f. chiapautaiensis J.C.Liao

Species of flowering plant

Quercus globosa is a species of oak. It is a tree endemic to Taiwan.
