= Quercus acutangula =

Scientific classification
- Kingdom: Plantae
- Clade: Tracheophytes
- Clade: Angiosperms
- Clade: Eudicots
- Clade: Rosids
- Order: Fagales
- Family: Fagaceae
- Genus: Quercus
- Subgenus: Quercus subg. Quercus
- Section: Quercus sect. Lobatae
- Species: Q. acutangula

Binomial name
- Quercus acutangula Trel.

Species of oak tree

Quercus acutangula is a species of oak native to Guerrero, Mexico. It usually grows in either the desert or the dry shrubland biome. It was first published in Repert. Spec. Nov. Regni Veg. 33: 318 in 1934 by William Trelease.

== Description ==
Quercus acutangula a tree or a shrub, typically exceeding 3 meters in height. Further information regarding its morphology, habitat preferences, and uses is currently unavailable.

== Validity ==
There is some debate among Mexican authors regarding the validity of Quercus acutangula as described by Trelease. According to a work published by Susana Valencia-A. in 2004, this species should not be currently recognized as valid. It is suggested that it could potentially be a hybrid or a morphological variety.
