= Quercus tsinglingensis =

Conservation status
- Data Deficient (IUCN 3.1)

Scientific classification
- Kingdom: Plantae
- Clade: Embryophytes
- Clade: Tracheophytes
- Clade: Spermatophytes
- Clade: Angiosperms
- Clade: Eudicots
- Clade: Rosids
- Order: Fagales
- Family: Fagaceae
- Genus: Quercus
- Subgenus: Quercus subg. Quercus
- Section: Quercus sect. Quercus
- Species: Q. tsinglingensis

Binomial name
- Quercus tsinglingensis S.L.Liou ex S.Z.Qu & W.H.Zhang

Species of flowering plant

Quercus tsinglingensis is a species of oak. It is a tree native to southeastern China. The species' distribution, population, and habitat are poorly understood, and the IUCN Red List assesses it as Data Deficient.
