= Quercus chartacea =

Scientific classification
- Kingdom: Plantae
- Clade: Embryophytes
- Clade: Tracheophytes
- Clade: Spermatophytes
- Clade: Angiosperms
- Clade: Eudicots
- Clade: Rosids
- Order: Fagales
- Family: Fagaceae
- Genus: Quercus
- Subgenus: Quercus subg. Quercus
- Section: Quercus sect. Quercus
- Species: Q. chartacea

Binomial name
- Quercus chartacea Trel.
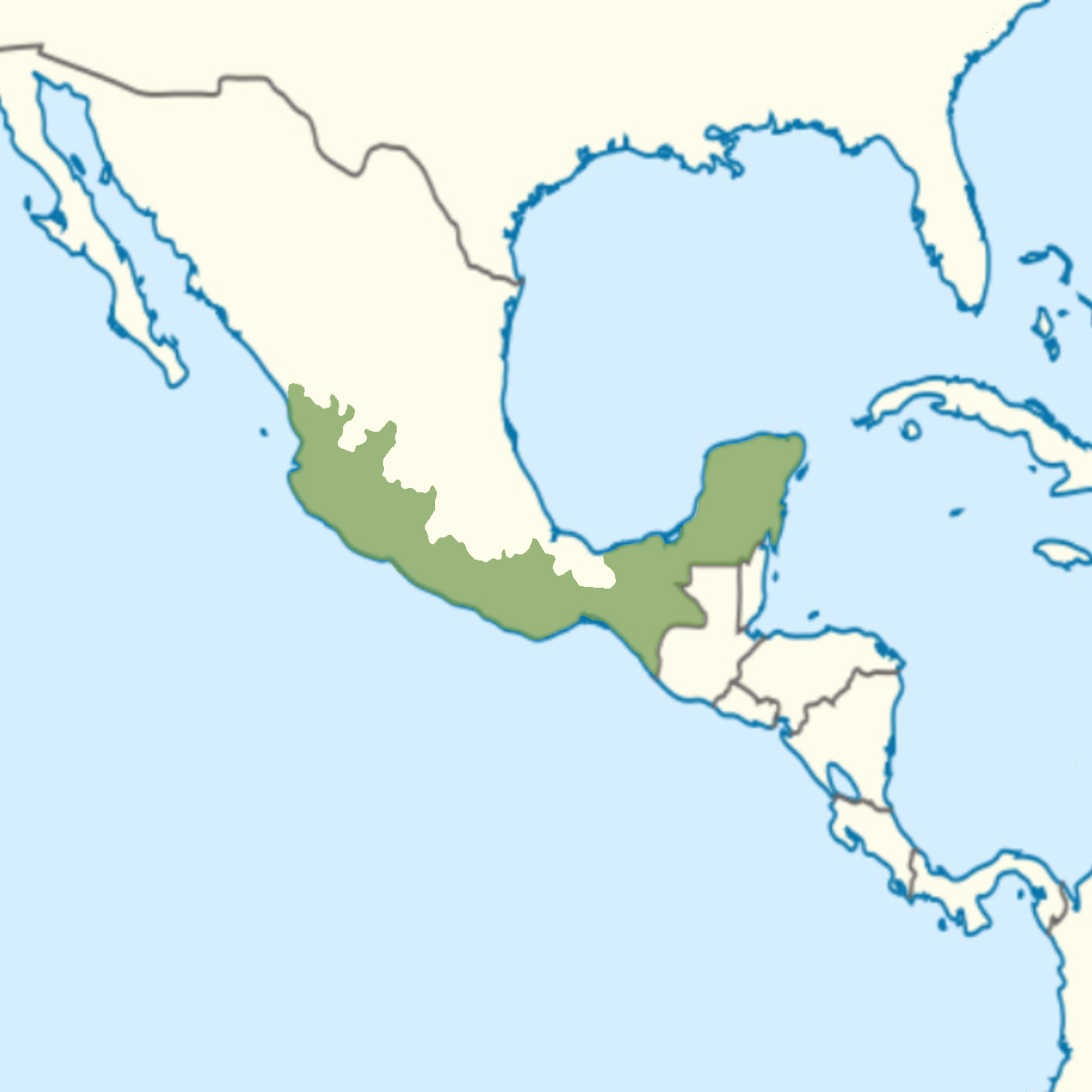
- Range of Q. chartacea across Mexico

Species of plant

Quercus chartacea is a species of white oak trees native to southern Mexico.

== Distribution and habitat ==
Quercus chartacea has been found in the Oaxaca and Chiapas states of Mexico, growing primarily in seasonally-dry tropical forests.
