= Quercus changhualingensis =

Scientific classification
- Kingdom: Plantae
- Clade: Tracheophytes
- Clade: Angiosperms
- Clade: Eudicots
- Clade: Rosids
- Order: Fagales
- Family: Fagaceae
- Genus: Quercus
- Species: Q. changhualingensis

Binomial name
- Quercus changhualingensis (G.A.Fu & X.J.Hong) N.H.Xia & Y.H.Tong (2016)

Synonyms
- Cyclobalanopsis changhuaglingensis G.A.Fu & X.J.Hong (2007)

Species of oak

Quercus changhualingensis is a species of oak. It is a tree endemic to the island of Hainan in southern China.
