= Quercus hui =

Scientific classification
- Kingdom: Plantae
- Clade: Tracheophytes
- Clade: Angiosperms
- Clade: Eudicots
- Clade: Rosids
- Order: Fagales
- Family: Fagaceae
- Genus: Quercus
- Subgenus: Quercus subg. Cerris
- Section: Quercus sect. Cyclobalanopsis
- Species: Q. hui

Binomial name
- Quercus hui Chun

Synonyms
- Cyclobalanopsis hui (Chun) Y.C.Hsu & H.Wei Jen

Species of plant

Quercus hui is a species of flowering plant in the family Fagaceae, native to south-east China and Hainan. It was first described in 1928. It is placed in subgenus Cerris, section Cyclobalanopsis.
