= Quercus gulielmi-treleasei =

Conservation status
- Vulnerable (IUCN 3.1)

Scientific classification
- Kingdom: Plantae
- Clade: Embryophytes
- Clade: Tracheophytes
- Clade: Spermatophytes
- Clade: Angiosperms
- Clade: Eudicots
- Clade: Rosids
- Order: Fagales
- Family: Fagaceae
- Genus: Quercus
- Subgenus: Quercus subg. Quercus
- Section: Quercus sect. Lobatae
- Species: Q. gulielmi-treleasei

Binomial name
- Quercus gulielmi-treleasei C.H.Mull.

Synonyms
- Quercus gulielmitreleasei C.H.Mull., orth. var.; Quercus seemannii subsp. gulielmi-treleasei (C.H.Mull.) A.E.Murray; Quercus seemannii var. gulielmi-treleasei (C.H.Mull.) A.E.Murray

Species of plant

Quercus gulielmi-treleasei is a species of flowering plant in the family Fagaceae. It is a tree native to Costa Rica and western Panama. It is placed in section Lobatae.
