= Quercus pseudosetulosa =

Conservation status
- Critically Endangered (IUCN 3.1)

Scientific classification
- Kingdom: Plantae
- Clade: Embryophytes
- Clade: Tracheophytes
- Clade: Spermatophytes
- Clade: Angiosperms
- Clade: Eudicots
- Clade: Rosids
- Order: Fagales
- Family: Fagaceae
- Genus: Quercus
- Subgenus: Quercus subg. Cerris
- Section: Quercus sect. Ilex
- Species: Q. pseudosetulosa

Binomial name
- Quercus pseudosetulosa Q.S.Li & T.Y.Tu

Species of flowering plant

Quercus pseudosetulosa is a species of oak. It is a tree endemic to Dawanshan Island in Guangdong Province of southeastern China. It grows on open rocky slopes near a stream on the island's highest peak.
