= Quercus elmeri =

Conservation status
- Near Threatened (IUCN 3.1)

Scientific classification
- Kingdom: Plantae
- Clade: Embryophytes
- Clade: Tracheophytes
- Clade: Spermatophytes
- Clade: Angiosperms
- Clade: Eudicots
- Clade: Rosids
- Order: Fagales
- Family: Fagaceae
- Genus: Quercus
- Subgenus: Quercus subg. Cerris
- Section: Quercus sect. Cyclobalanopsis
- Species: Q. elmeri

Binomial name
- Quercus elmeri Merr.

Species of plant

Quercus elmeri is a species of oak native to Borneo, Sumatra, and Peninsular Malaysia. It is placed in Quercus subgenus Cerris, section Cyclobalanopsis.

== Description ==
Quercus elmeri is a large tree, growing up to 50 meters high.

== Range and habitat ==
Quercus elmeri grows in lowland mixed dipterocarp rain forests and in submontane and lower montane forests on Sumatra, Borneo, and Peninsular Malaysia, from 150 to 1,800 metres elevation. It typically grows on basic and ultrabasic soils and on poor sandy soils on hillsides and ridges. It is an emergent tree in undisturbed forests, growing above the main canopy.
