= Quercus zhekunii =

Scientific classification
- Kingdom: Plantae
- Clade: Embryophytes
- Clade: Tracheophytes
- Clade: Angiosperms
- Clade: Eudicots
- Clade: Rosids
- Order: Fagales
- Family: Fagaceae
- Genus: Quercus
- Subgenus: Quercus subg. Cerris
- Section: Quercus sect. Ilex
- Species: Q. zhekunii

Binomial name
- Quercus zhekunii M.Deng & J.Huang

Species of flowering plant

Quercus zhekunii is a species of oak endemic to Guangxi Province in south-central China. It is a small sclerophyllous shrub or small tree, 2 to 4 metres tall. It grows in subtropical rocky limestone hills from 450 to 830 metres elevation, and has strong tolerance for heat and drought stress.

The species was described by Min Deng and Jian Huang in 2024.
