= Quercus tomentosinervis =

Conservation status
- Critically Endangered (IUCN 3.1)

Scientific classification
- Kingdom: Plantae
- Clade: Embryophytes
- Clade: Tracheophytes
- Clade: Spermatophytes
- Clade: Angiosperms
- Clade: Eudicots
- Clade: Rosids
- Order: Fagales
- Family: Fagaceae
- Genus: Quercus
- Subgenus: Quercus subg. Cerris
- Section: Quercus sect. Cyclobalanopsis
- Species: Q. tomentosinervis

Binomial name
- Quercus tomentosinervis (Y.C.Hsu & H.Wei Jen) C.C.Huang

Synonyms
- Cyclobalanopsis tomentosinervis Y.C.Hsu & H.Wei Jen

Species of oak tree

Quercus tomentosinervis is an Asian species of tree in the beech family Fagaceae. It is native to Guizhou and Yunnan provinces of southern China. It is placed in subgenus Cerris, section Cyclobalanopsis.

Quercus tomentosinervis is a tree up to 20 meters tall. Leaves can be as much as 15 cm long, thick and leather, green and hairless on top but covered with brown woolly hairs on the underside.
