= Quercus semiserratoides =

Conservation status
- Critically Endangered (IUCN 3.1)

Scientific classification
- Kingdom: Plantae
- Clade: Embryophytes
- Clade: Tracheophytes
- Clade: Spermatophytes
- Clade: Angiosperms
- Clade: Eudicots
- Clade: Rosids
- Order: Fagales
- Family: Fagaceae
- Genus: Quercus
- Subgenus: Quercus subg. Cerris
- Section: Quercus sect. Cyclobalanopsis
- Species: Q. semiserratoides

Binomial name
- Quercus semiserratoides (Y.C.Hsu & H.Wei Jen) C.C.Huang & Y.T.Chang

Synonyms
- Cyclobalanopsis semiserratoides Y.C.Hsu & H.W.Jen

Species of flowering plant

Quercus semiserratoides is a species of oak. It is a tree endemic to southeastern Yunnan in south-central China. It is recorded from only two locations near the Vietnam border, and not confirmed since 1992. The area has been extensively deforested, and the species may be extinct in the wild.

The species was first described as Cyclobalanopsis semiserratoides by Yung Chun Hsu and Hsien Wei Jen in 1976. In 1992 Cheng Chiu Huang and Yong Tian Chang placed the species in genus Quercus as Q. semiserratoides.
