= Quercus breviradiata =

Scientific classification
- Kingdom: Plantae
- Clade: Embryophytes
- Clade: Tracheophytes
- Clade: Spermatophytes
- Clade: Angiosperms
- Clade: Eudicots
- Clade: Rosids
- Order: Fagales
- Family: Fagaceae
- Genus: Quercus
- Subgenus: Quercus subg. Cerris
- Section: Quercus sect. Cyclobalanopsis
- Species: Q. breviradiata

Binomial name
- Quercus breviradiata (W.C.Cheng) C.C.Huang

Synonyms
- Cyclobalanopsis breviradiata W.C.Cheng

Species of flowering plant

Quercus breviradiata is a species of oak. It is a tree native to central and south-central China.

The species was first described as Cyclobalanopsis breviradiata by Wan Chun Cheng in 1979. In 1992 Cheng Chiu Huang placed the species in genus Quercus as Q. breviradiata.
