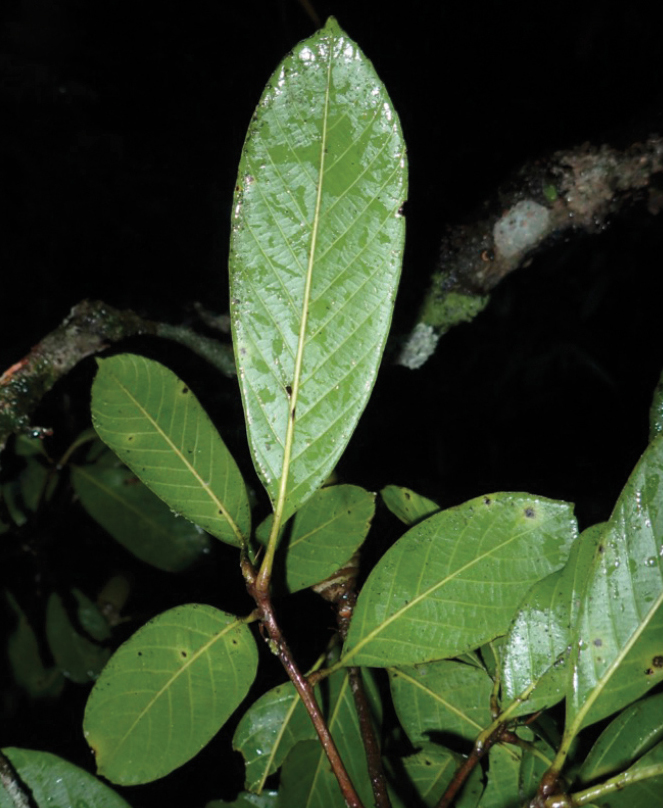

Conservation status
- Critically Endangered (IUCN 3.1)

Scientific classification
- Kingdom: Plantae
- Clade: Embryophytes
- Clade: Tracheophytes
- Clade: Spermatophytes
- Clade: Angiosperms
- Clade: Eudicots
- Clade: Rosids
- Order: Fagales
- Family: Fagaceae
- Genus: Quercus
- Subgenus: Quercus subg. Cerris
- Section: Quercus sect. Cyclobalanopsis
- Species: Q. xuanlienensis

Binomial name
- Quercus xuanlienensis H.T.Binh, Ngoc & T.N.Bon

= Quercus xuanlienensis =

Species of flowering plant

Quercus xuanlienensis is a species of oak. It is a tree endemic to Vietnam. It is known from a single individual from Xuan Lien Nature Reserve in Thanh Hóa Province, where it grows in montane evergreen moist forest at 810 metres elevation.

The species was described by Hoang Thi Binh, Nguyen Van Ngoc, and Trinh Ngoc Bon in 2018.
