= Quercus airensis =

Scientific classification
- Kingdom: Plantae
- Clade: Embryophytes
- Clade: Tracheophytes
- Clade: Spermatophytes
- Clade: Angiosperms
- Clade: Eudicots
- Clade: Rosids
- Order: Fagales
- Family: Fagaceae
- Genus: Quercus
- Subgenus: Quercus subg. Cerris
- Section: Quercus sect. Ilex
- Species: Q. airensis

Binomial name
- Quercus airensis Franco & Vasc.

Synonyms
- Quercus coccifera f. tomentosa (A.DC.) Cout.; Quercus coccifera var. tomentosa A.DC.; Quercus webbei Amo

Species of flowering plant

Quercus airensis is a species of oak. It is a shrub or tree endemic to Portugal.
