= Quercus dongfangensis =

Conservation status
- Data Deficient (IUCN 3.1)

Scientific classification
- Kingdom: Plantae
- Clade: Embryophytes
- Clade: Tracheophytes
- Clade: Spermatophytes
- Clade: Angiosperms
- Clade: Eudicots
- Clade: Rosids
- Order: Fagales
- Family: Fagaceae
- Genus: Quercus
- Subgenus: Quercus subg. Cerris
- Section: Quercus sect. Cyclobalanopsis
- Species: Q. dongfangensis

Binomial name
- Quercus dongfangensis C.C.Huang, F.W.Xing & Ze X.Li (1996)

Synonyms
- Cyclobalanopsis dongfangensis (C.C.Huang, F.W.Xing & Ze X.Li) Y.Y.Luo & R.J.Wang; Cyclobalanopsis dongfangensis (C.C.Huang, F.W.Xing & Ze X.Li) Y.T.Chang

Species of oak

Quercus dongfangensis is a species of oak. It is a tree endemic to the island of Hainan in southern China. It grows in montane forests up to 1,500 meters elevation. Little is known about the population, habitat, or ecology of the species.
