= Quercus juergensenii =

Scientific classification
- Kingdom: Plantae
- Clade: Embryophytes
- Clade: Tracheophytes
- Clade: Angiosperms
- Clade: Eudicots
- Clade: Rosids
- Order: Fagales
- Family: Fagaceae
- Genus: Quercus
- Subgenus: Quercus subg. Quercus
- Section: Quercus sect. Quercus
- Species: Q. juergensenii

Binomial name
- Quercus juergensenii Liebm.

Species of flowering plant

Quercus juergensenii is a species of oak. It is a tree native to the state of Puebla in central Mexico.

The species was named by Frederik Liebmann in 2026. Some authorities consider it a synonym of Quercus polymorpha.
