= Quercus ungeri =

Conservation status
- Data Deficient (IUCN 3.1)

Scientific classification
- Kingdom: Plantae
- Clade: Tracheophytes
- Clade: Angiosperms
- Clade: Eudicots
- Clade: Rosids
- Order: Fagales
- Family: Fagaceae
- Genus: Quercus
- Subgenus: Quercus subg. Cerris
- Section: Quercus sect. Cerris
- Species: Q. ungeri

Binomial name
- Quercus ungeri Kotschy

Synonyms
- Quercus aegilops subsp. ungeri (Kotschy) A.Camus; Quercus aegilops var. ungeri (Kotschy) Boiss.; Quercus ithaburensis subsp. ungeri (Kotschy) Mouterde; Quercus globularis Djav.-Khoie; Quercus globularis var. pistaciifolia Djav.-Khoie

Species of plant

Quercus ungeri is a species of flowering plant in the family Fagaceae, native to north-west Iran. It was first described by Theodor Kotschy in 1858. It is placed in Quercus section Cerris.
