= Quercus coahuilensis =

Conservation status
- Data Deficient (IUCN 3.1)

Scientific classification
- Kingdom: Plantae
- Clade: Embryophytes
- Clade: Tracheophytes
- Clade: Spermatophytes
- Clade: Angiosperms
- Clade: Eudicots
- Clade: Rosids
- Order: Fagales
- Family: Fagaceae
- Genus: Quercus
- Subgenus: Quercus subg. Quercus
- Section: Quercus sect. Lobatae
- Species: Q. coahuilensis

Binomial name
- Quercus coahuilensis Nixon & C.H.Mull.

Species of oak tree

Quercus coahuilensis is a species of plant in the family Fagaceae. It is endemic to the Mexican state of Coahuila. It is placed in section Lobatae.
