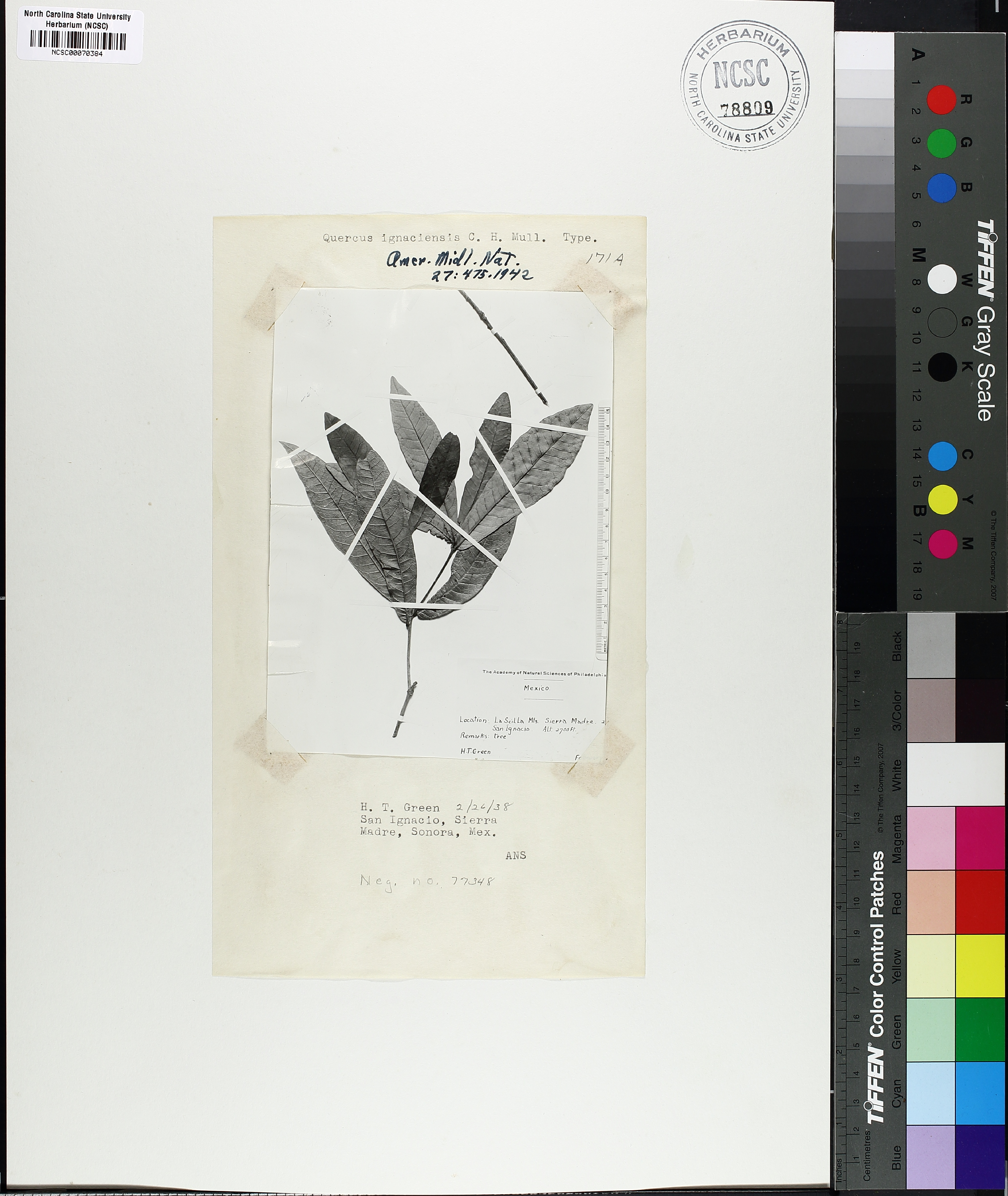

Conservation status
- Data Deficient (IUCN 3.1)

Scientific classification
- Kingdom: Plantae
- Clade: Embryophytes
- Clade: Tracheophytes
- Clade: Spermatophytes
- Clade: Angiosperms
- Clade: Eudicots
- Clade: Rosids
- Order: Fagales
- Family: Fagaceae
- Genus: Quercus
- Subgenus: Quercus subg. Quercus
- Section: Quercus sect. Lobatae
- Species: Q. ignaciensis

Binomial name
- Quercus ignaciensis C.H.Mull.
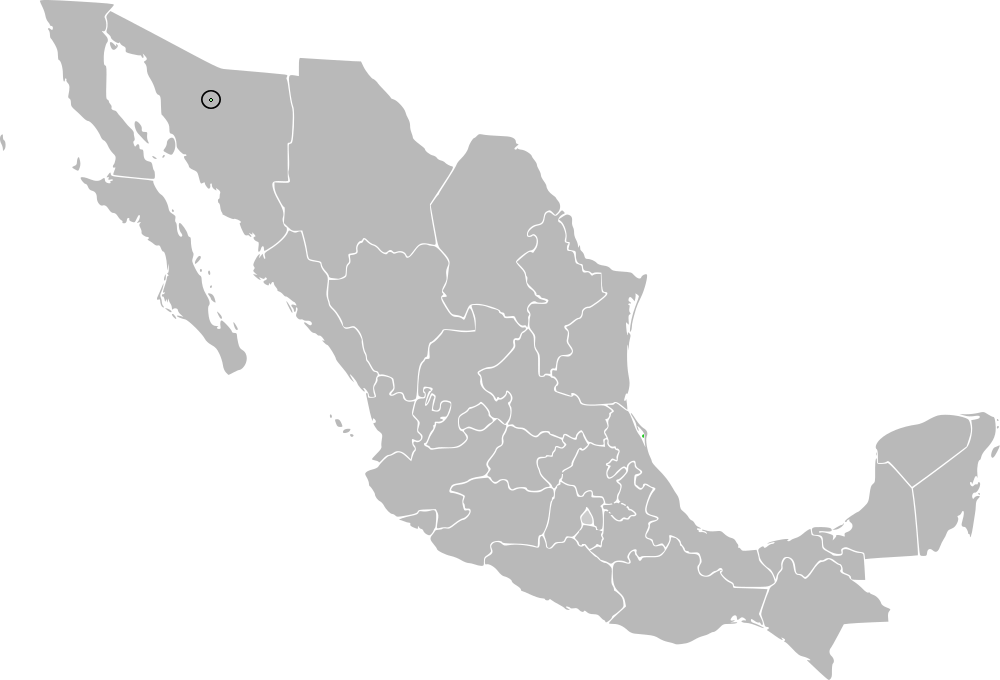

= Quercus ignaciensis =

Species of oak tree

Quercus ignaciensis is a tree in the genus Quercus. It is found only in an isolated area of the Mexican state of Sonora. It grows only in a subtropical biome. It usually grows over three metres (9.8 ft) in height. Quercus ignaciensis was described in 1942.
