= Quercus yanqianii =

Scientific classification
- Kingdom: Plantae
- Clade: Tracheophytes
- Clade: Angiosperms
- Clade: Eudicots
- Clade: Rosids
- Order: Fagales
- Family: Fagaceae
- Genus: Quercus
- Species: Q. yanqianii

Binomial name
- Quercus yanqianii (G.A.Fu) N.H.Xia & Y.H.Tong (2016)

Synonyms
- Cyclobalanopsis yanqianii G.A.Fu (2007)

Species of oak tree

Quercus yanquianii is a species of oak tree. It is endemic to the island of Hainan in southern China.
