= Quercus planipocula =

Conservation status
- Least Concern (IUCN 3.1)

Scientific classification
- Kingdom: Plantae
- Clade: Tracheophytes
- Clade: Angiosperms
- Clade: Eudicots
- Clade: Rosids
- Order: Fagales
- Family: Fagaceae
- Genus: Quercus
- Subgenus: Quercus subg. Quercus
- Section: Quercus sect. Lobatae
- Species: Q. planipocula

Binomial name
- Quercus planipocula Trel.

Species of oak tree

Quercus planipocula is a species of oak. It is native to western Mexico in Sinaloa, Nayarit, and Guerrero.

It is a large forest tree up to 20 metres (66 feet) tall with a trunk often more than 60 centimetres (24 inches) in diameter. The leaves are as much as 27 cm (11 in) long.
