= Quercus motuoensis =

Conservation status
- Critically Endangered (IUCN 3.1)

Scientific classification
- Kingdom: Plantae
- Clade: Embryophytes
- Clade: Tracheophytes
- Clade: Spermatophytes
- Clade: Angiosperms
- Clade: Eudicots
- Clade: Rosids
- Order: Fagales
- Family: Fagaceae
- Genus: Quercus
- Subgenus: Quercus subg. Cerris
- Section: Quercus sect. Cyclobalanopsis
- Species: Q. motuoensis

Binomial name
- Quercus motuoensis C.C.Huang 1992

Synonyms
- Cyclobalanopsis motuoensis (C.C.Huang) Y.C.Hsu & H.Wei Jen

Species of tree

Quercus motuoensis is an uncommon Asian species of trees in the beech family Fagaceae. It has been found only in Tibet, but may be extinct. It is placed in subgenus Cerris, section Cyclobalanopsis.

Quercus motuoensis is a large tree up to 30 meters tall. Leaves can be as much as 10 cm long.
