= Quercus huicholensis =

Scientific classification
- Kingdom: Plantae
- Clade: Embryophytes
- Clade: Tracheophytes
- Clade: Angiosperms
- Clade: Eudicots
- Clade: Rosids
- Order: Fagales
- Family: Fagaceae
- Genus: Quercus
- Subgenus: Quercus subg. Quercus
- Section: Quercus sect. Lobatae
- Species: Q. huicholensis

Binomial name
- Quercus huicholensis R.A.McCauley

Species of flowering plant

Quercus huicholensis is a species of oak. It is a tree native to southern Durango, Zacatecas, and northern Jalisco states in the southern Sierra Madre Occidental of Mexico, including the Sierra de los Huicholes. It grows up to 13 meters tall, typically on rocky slopes and canyon sides, from 1,650 to 2,820 meters elevation.

The species was described by Ross A. McCauley in 2020.
