= Quercus xylina =

Conservation status
- Near Threatened (IUCN 3.1)

Scientific classification
- Kingdom: Plantae
- Clade: Embryophytes
- Clade: Tracheophytes
- Clade: Spermatophytes
- Clade: Angiosperms
- Clade: Eudicots
- Clade: Rosids
- Order: Fagales
- Family: Fagaceae
- Genus: Quercus
- Subgenus: Quercus subg. Quercus
- Section: Quercus sect. Quercus
- Species: Q. xylina

Binomial name
- Quercus xylina Scheidw.

Synonyms
- Quercus callosa M.Martens ex A.DC.; Quercus laxa Liebm.; Quercus reticulata var. laxa (Liebm.) Wenz.

Species of plant

Quercus xylina is a species of oak in the family Fagaceae, native to western Mexico. It was first described by Michael J. F. Scheidweiler in 1837. It is classified in Quercus sect. Quercus.
