= Quercus jinpinensis =

Conservation status
- Data Deficient (IUCN 3.1)

Scientific classification
- Kingdom: Plantae
- Clade: Embryophytes
- Clade: Tracheophytes
- Clade: Spermatophytes
- Clade: Angiosperms
- Clade: Eudicots
- Clade: Rosids
- Order: Fagales
- Family: Fagaceae
- Genus: Quercus
- Subgenus: Quercus subg. Cerris
- Section: Quercus sect. Cyclobalanopsis
- Species: Q. jinpinensis

Binomial name
- Quercus jinpinensis (Y.C.Hsu & Jen) C.C.Huang 1992

Synonyms
- Cyclobalanopsis jinpinensis Y.C.Hsu & H.Wei Jen 1976

Species of oak tree

Quercus jinpinensis is an uncommon Asian species of tree in the beech family Fagaceae. It is native to southern China, found only in the Province of Yunnan. It is placed in subgenus Cerris, section Cyclobalanopsis.

Quercus jinpinensis is a tree. The leaves can be as much as 11 cm long.
