= Quercus breedloveana =

Conservation status
- Data Deficient (IUCN 3.1)

Scientific classification
- Kingdom: Plantae
- Clade: Embryophytes
- Clade: Tracheophytes
- Clade: Spermatophytes
- Clade: Angiosperms
- Clade: Eudicots
- Clade: Rosids
- Order: Fagales
- Family: Fagaceae
- Genus: Quercus
- Subgenus: Quercus subg. Quercus
- Section: Quercus sect. Lobatae
- Species: Q. breedloveana

Binomial name
- Quercus breedloveana Nixon & Barrie

Species of flowering plant

Quercus breedloveana is a species of oak. It is a tree native to the states of Chiapas and Guerrero in southern Mexico. It grows in montane cloud forest from 1,100 to 1,800 meters elevation.

The species was described by Kevin C. Nixon and Fred Rogers Barrie in 2017.
