= Quercus kongshanensis =

Scientific classification
- Kingdom: Plantae
- Clade: Embryophytes
- Clade: Tracheophytes
- Clade: Angiosperms
- Clade: Eudicots
- Clade: Rosids
- Order: Fagales
- Family: Fagaceae
- Genus: Quercus
- Subgenus: Quercus subg. Cerris
- Section: Quercus sect. Ilex
- Species: Q. kongshanensis

Binomial name
- Quercus kongshanensis Y.C.Hsu & H.W.Jen

Species of flowering plant

Quercus kongshanensis is a species of oak. It is a tree endemic to Sichuan Province of south-central China.

The species was described by Yung Chun Hsu and Hsien Wei Jen in 1976. Some authorities consider it a synonym of Quercus engleriana.
