= Quercus manzanillana =

Scientific classification
- Kingdom: Plantae
- Clade: Embryophytes
- Clade: Tracheophytes
- Clade: Spermatophytes
- Clade: Angiosperms
- Clade: Eudicots
- Clade: Rosids
- Order: Fagales
- Family: Fagaceae
- Genus: Quercus
- Subgenus: Quercus subg. Quercus
- Section: Quercus sect. Quercus
- Species: Q. manzanillana

Binomial name
- Quercus manzanillana Trel.

Species of oak tree

Quercus manzanillana is a shrub in the genus Quercus indigenous to Mexico. It was described in 1924 by William Trelease. It is found in the Mexican state of Puebla.

== Description ==
The twigs of Quercus manzanillana measure about 2-3 mm in diameter. They are fluted and initially covered in a grayish, tomentulose coating. The buds are light brown, glabrous and glossy, ovoid in shape, and approximately 2 x 3 mm in size.

The leaves of this oak species are deciduous and elliptical in shape. They are obtuse and exhibit a more or less cordate base. The leaf margins are typically entire or very obscurely repand towards the upper part. The leaves measure 2.5-3.5 cm in width and 5-8 cm in length. The upper leaf surface is essentially glabrous and somewhat glossy, while the lower surface is densely covered in a persistent rusty-tomentose pubescence. The leaves have approximately 10 pairs of looped veins, and the petiole is tomentulose and measures around 5 mm in length.

== Validity ==
According to Susana Valencia-A. in 2004, this species described by Trelease is not valid. They claim that Quercus manzanillana represents a hybrid between different oak species or a morphological variety of an existing species. In 2003, Zavala-Chavez proposed an alternative classification for Quercus manzanillana. According to Zavala-Chavez's research, this oak species could be considered a variety of Quercus deserticola. However, these proposals are not universally accepted, and the taxonomic relationship between Quercus manzanillana and other oak species requires additional investigation.
