= Quercus kiukiangensis =

Conservation status
- Endangered (IUCN 3.1)

Scientific classification
- Kingdom: Plantae
- Clade: Embryophytes
- Clade: Tracheophytes
- Clade: Spermatophytes
- Clade: Angiosperms
- Clade: Eudicots
- Clade: Rosids
- Order: Fagales
- Family: Fagaceae
- Genus: Quercus
- Subgenus: Quercus subg. Cerris
- Section: Quercus sect. Cyclobalanopsis
- Species: Q. kiukiangensis

Binomial name
- Quercus kiukiangensis (Y.T.Chang) Y.T.Chang 1982

Synonyms
- Cyclobalanopsis kiukiangensis Y.T.Chang 1976; Cyclobalanopsis xiangxiensis C.J.Qi & Q.Z.Lin; Cyclobalanopsis xizangensis Y.C.Hsu & H.Wei Jen; Quercus xizangensis (Y.C.Hsu & H.Wei Jen) C.C.Huang & Y.T.Chang

Species of oak tree

Quercus kiukiangensis is an uncommon Asian species of trees in the beech family Fagaceae. It has only been found in Tibet and Yunnan. It is placed in subgenus Cerris, section Cyclobalanopsis.

Quercus kiukiangensis is a large tree up to 30 meters tall. Leaves can be as much as 18 cm long.
