= Quercus monnula =

Conservation status
- Critically Endangered (IUCN 3.1)

Scientific classification
- Kingdom: Plantae
- Clade: Embryophytes
- Clade: Tracheophytes
- Clade: Spermatophytes
- Clade: Angiosperms
- Clade: Eudicots
- Clade: Rosids
- Order: Fagales
- Family: Fagaceae
- Genus: Quercus
- Subgenus: Quercus subg. Quercus
- Section: Quercus sect. Quercus
- Species: Q. monnula

Binomial name
- Quercus monnula Y.C.Hsu & H.W.Jen

Species of flowering plant

Quercus monnula is a species of oak. It is a tree native to Sichuan and Yunnan provinces of south-central China. The species is known from only two sites near roads, where it grows in subtropical forest from 100 to 2,000 metres elevation. The IUCN Red List assesses the species as Critically Endangered.

The species was described by Yung Chun Hsu and Hsien Wei Jen in 1979.
