= Quercus pentacycla =

Conservation status
- Least Concern (IUCN 3.1)

Scientific classification
- Kingdom: Plantae
- Clade: Embryophytes
- Clade: Tracheophytes
- Clade: Spermatophytes
- Clade: Angiosperms
- Clade: Eudicots
- Clade: Rosids
- Order: Fagales
- Family: Fagaceae
- Genus: Quercus
- Subgenus: Quercus subg. Cerris
- Section: Quercus sect. Cyclobalanopsis
- Species: Q. pentacycla

Binomial name
- Quercus pentacycla Y.T.Chang

Synonyms
- Cyclobalanopsis pentacycla (Y.T.Chang) Y.T.Chang ex Y.C.Hsu & H.Wei Jen

Species of oak tree

Quercus pentacycla is an uncommon Asian species of tree in the beech family Fagaceae. It has been found only in the Province of Yunnan in southwestern China. It is placed in subgenus Cerris, section Cyclobalanopsis.

Quercus pentacycla is a tree up to 15 meters tall. Twigs are grayish brown. Leaves can be as much as 14 cm long.
