= Quercus pinbianensis =

Conservation status
- Critically Endangered (IUCN 3.1)

Scientific classification
- Kingdom: Plantae
- Clade: Embryophytes
- Clade: Tracheophytes
- Clade: Spermatophytes
- Clade: Angiosperms
- Clade: Eudicots
- Clade: Rosids
- Order: Fagales
- Family: Fagaceae
- Genus: Quercus
- Subgenus: Quercus subg. Cerris
- Section: Quercus sect. Cyclobalanopsis
- Species: Q. pinbianensis

Binomial name
- Quercus pinbianensis (Y.C.Hsu & H.W.Jen) C.C.Huang & Y.T.Chang

Synonyms
- Cyclobalanopsis pinbianensis Y.C.Hsu & H.W.Jen

Species of flowering plant

Quercus pinbianensis is a species of oak. It is a tree endemic to Yunnan Province in south-central China. It grows in subtropical moist submontane and montane forests from 300 to 1,700 metres elevation.
