= Quercus sarahmariae =

Conservation status
- Data Deficient (IUCN 3.1)

Scientific classification
- Kingdom: Plantae
- Clade: Embryophytes
- Clade: Tracheophytes
- Clade: Spermatophytes
- Clade: Angiosperms
- Clade: Eudicots
- Clade: Rosids
- Order: Fagales
- Family: Fagaceae
- Genus: Quercus
- Subgenus: Quercus subg. Quercus
- Section: Quercus sect. Lobatae
- Species: Q. sarahmariae

Binomial name
- Quercus sarahmariae Nixon & Barrie

Species of flowering plant

Quercus sarahmariae is a species of oak. It is a tree native to Costa Rica and Panama. It grows in wet premontane or cloud forests from 700 to 1,900 metres elevation.

The species was described by Kevin C. Nixon and Fred Barrie in 2017.
