= Quercus chimaltenangana =

Scientific classification
- Kingdom: Plantae
- Clade: Embryophytes
- Clade: Tracheophytes
- Clade: Angiosperms
- Clade: Eudicots
- Clade: Rosids
- Order: Fagales
- Family: Fagaceae
- Genus: Quercus
- Subgenus: Quercus subg. Quercus
- Section: Quercus sect. Lobatae
- Species: Q. chimaltenangana

Binomial name
- Quercus chimaltenangana Trel.

Species of flowering plant

Quercus chimaltenangana is a species of oak. It is a tree endemic to Guatemala.

The species was described by William Trelease in 1933. Some authorities consider it a synonym of Quercus crispipilis.
