= Quercus vallicola =

Scientific classification
- Kingdom: Plantae
- Clade: Embryophytes
- Clade: Tracheophytes
- Clade: Angiosperms
- Clade: Eudicots
- Clade: Rosids
- Order: Fagales
- Family: Fagaceae
- Genus: Quercus
- Subgenus: Quercus subg. Quercus
- Section: Quercus sect. Quercus
- Species: Q. vallicola

Binomial name
- Quercus vallicola Trel.

Species of flowering plant

Quercus vallicola is a species of oak. It is a tree native to central Mexico, where it grows in deserts and dry shrublands.

The species was described by William Trelease in 1924. Some authorities consider it a synonym of Quercus deserticola.
