= Quercus chungii =

Conservation status
- Least Concern (IUCN 3.1)

Scientific classification
- Kingdom: Plantae
- Clade: Embryophytes
- Clade: Tracheophytes
- Clade: Spermatophytes
- Clade: Angiosperms
- Clade: Eudicots
- Clade: Rosids
- Order: Fagales
- Family: Fagaceae
- Genus: Quercus
- Subgenus: Quercus subg. Cerris
- Section: Quercus sect. Cyclobalanopsis
- Species: Q. chungii

Binomial name
- Quercus chungii F.P.Metcalf

Synonyms
- Cyclobalanopsis chungii (F.P. Metcalf) Y.C. Hsu & H.Wei Jen

Species of tree

Quercus chungii is an uncommon species of tree in the beech family. It is native to the provinces of Guangxi and Guizhou in southern China. It is placed in subgenus Cerris, section Cyclobalanopsis.

Quercus chungii is a tree up to 15 meters tall with brown hairy twigs and leaves as much as 12 cm long.
