= Quercus melissae =

Conservation status
- Data Deficient (IUCN 3.1)

Scientific classification
- Kingdom: Plantae
- Clade: Embryophytes
- Clade: Tracheophytes
- Clade: Spermatophytes
- Clade: Angiosperms
- Clade: Eudicots
- Clade: Rosids
- Order: Fagales
- Family: Fagaceae
- Genus: Quercus
- Subgenus: Quercus subg. Quercus
- Section: Quercus sect. Quercus
- Species: Q. melissae

Binomial name
- Quercus melissae Nixon & Barrie

Species of flowering plant

Quercus melissae is a species of oak. It is a tree endemic to Guatemala and the state of Chiapas in southern Mexico. It grows in dry montane oak and pine–oak forests from 700 to 2,300 meters elevation.

The species was described by Kevin C. Nixon and Fred Barrie in 2017.
