= Quercus gracilior =

Conservation status
- Data Deficient (IUCN 3.1)

Scientific classification
- Kingdom: Plantae
- Clade: Embryophytes
- Clade: Tracheophytes
- Clade: Spermatophytes
- Clade: Angiosperms
- Clade: Eudicots
- Clade: Rosids
- Order: Fagales
- Family: Fagaceae
- Genus: Quercus
- Subgenus: Quercus subg. Quercus
- Section: Quercus sect. Lobatae
- Species: Q. gracilior

Binomial name
- Quercus gracilior C.H.Mull.

Species of flowering plant

Quercus gracilior is a species of oak. It is a tree endemic to Honduras. It grows in moist tropical montane forest. Little is known about the species' distribution, population, and habitat, and the IUCN Red List assesses the species as Data Deficient.

The species was described by Cornelius Herman Muller in 1942.
