= Quercus kouangsiensis =

Conservation status
- Endangered (IUCN 3.1)

Scientific classification
- Kingdom: Plantae
- Clade: Embryophytes
- Clade: Tracheophytes
- Clade: Spermatophytes
- Clade: Angiosperms
- Clade: Eudicots
- Clade: Rosids
- Order: Fagales
- Family: Fagaceae
- Genus: Quercus
- Subgenus: Quercus subg. Cerris
- Section: Quercus sect. Cyclobalanopsis
- Species: Q. kouangsiensis

Binomial name
- Quercus kouangsiensis A.Camus 1937

Synonyms
- Cyclobalanopsis kouangsiensis (A.Camus) Y.C.Hsu & H.Wei Jen; Quercus macrocalyx var. tomentosa Metcalf; Quercus nemoralis Chun

Species of tree

Quercus kouangsiensis is an uncommon Asian species of trees in the beech family Fagaceae. It has been found only in southern China, in the provinces of Guangdong, Guangxi, Hunan, Yunnan, and Hainan. It is placed in subgenus Cerris, section Cyclobalanopsis.

Quercus kouangsiensis is a tree up to 15 meters tall. Leaves can be as much as 20 cm long.
