= Quercus gaharuensis =

Conservation status
- Vulnerable (IUCN 3.1)

Scientific classification
- Kingdom: Plantae
- Clade: Embryophytes
- Clade: Tracheophytes
- Clade: Spermatophytes
- Clade: Angiosperms
- Clade: Eudicots
- Clade: Rosids
- Order: Fagales
- Family: Fagaceae
- Genus: Quercus
- Subgenus: Quercus subg. Cerris
- Section: Quercus sect. Cyclobalanopsis
- Species: Q. gaharuensis

Binomial name
- Quercus gaharuensis Soepadmo (1966)

Species of plant

Quercus gaharuensis is a species of oak native to Borneo, Sumatra, and Peninsular Malaysia. It is placed in Quercus subgenus Cerris, section Cyclobalanopsis.

== Range and habitat ==
Quercus gaharuensis is known from widely scattered sites in Sumatra, Peninsular Malaysia, and Borneo (East Kalimantan, Sarawak, and Sabah).

It grows in lowland mixed dipterocarp rain forests and lower montane rain forests up to 1,400 metres elevation.

== Conservation ==
Quercus gaharuensis is threatened with habitat loss from widespread deforestation across its range. The populations in northern Sumatra, comprising 25% of the species' known sites, are in or adjacent to protected areas. The known sites in central Sumatra and on Borneo are unprotected and have been logged or converted to agriculture.
