= Quercus valdinervosa =

Conservation status
- Near Threatened (IUCN 3.1)

Scientific classification
- Kingdom: Plantae
- Clade: Embryophytes
- Clade: Tracheophytes
- Clade: Spermatophytes
- Clade: Angiosperms
- Clade: Eudicots
- Clade: Rosids
- Order: Fagales
- Family: Fagaceae
- Genus: Quercus
- Subgenus: Quercus subg. Cerris
- Section: Quercus sect. Cyclobalanopsis
- Species: Q. valdinervosa

Binomial name
- Quercus valdinervosa Soepadmo (1968)

Synonyms
- Quercus mespilifolia var. borneensis Heine (1951)

Species of plant

Quercus valdinervosa is a species of oak endemic to Borneo. It is placed in Quercus subgenus Cerris, section Cyclobalanopsis.

== Range and habitat ==
Quercus valdinervosa is native to Borneo, where it is known from about ten locations in Brunei, Sarawak, Sabah, and Kalimantan. The species has a large range, but populations are widely scattered and its area of occupancy (AOO) is only 84 km^{2}.

It grows mostly in oak-laurel montane forests, from 480 to 2,300 metres elevation.
