= Quercus chrysocalyx =

Conservation status
- Data Deficient (IUCN 3.1)

Scientific classification
- Kingdom: Plantae
- Clade: Embryophytes
- Clade: Tracheophytes
- Clade: Spermatophytes
- Clade: Angiosperms
- Clade: Eudicots
- Clade: Rosids
- Order: Fagales
- Family: Fagaceae
- Genus: Quercus
- Subgenus: Quercus subg. Cerris
- Section: Quercus sect. Cyclobalanopsis
- Species: Q. chrysocalyx

Binomial name
- Quercus chrysocalyx Hickel & A.Camus

Synonyms
- Cyclobalanopsis chrysocalyx (Hickel & A.Camus) Hjelmq.

Species of oak tree

Quercus chrysocalyx is a tree species in the beech family Fagaceae; there are no known subspecies. It is native to Cambodia, China (Yunnan), Laos, Thailand, and Vietnam. It is placed in subgenus Cerris, section Cyclobalanopsis (the ring-cupped oaks).

This oak tree grows up to 15 m tall, with large acorns – 25–30 mm, and has been recorded from Vietnam, where it may be called sồi quang.

== Taxonomy & naming ==
Quercus chrysocalyx was first described in 1921 by Paul Robert Hickel and Aimée Antoinette Camus. The species epithet, chrysocalyx, is derived from the Greek chrysos ("gold") and kalyx, ("cup" or "calyx"), and describes the plant as having golden calyces.
