= Quercus lowii =

Conservation status
- Near Threatened (IUCN 3.1)

Scientific classification
- Kingdom: Plantae
- Clade: Embryophytes
- Clade: Tracheophytes
- Clade: Spermatophytes
- Clade: Angiosperms
- Clade: Eudicots
- Clade: Rosids
- Order: Fagales
- Family: Fagaceae
- Genus: Quercus
- Subgenus: Quercus subg. Cerris
- Section: Quercus sect. Cyclobalanopsis
- Species: Q. lowii

Binomial name
- Quercus lowii King

Synonyms
- Cyclobalanopsis lowii (King) Schottky

Species of oak tree

Quercus lowii is a species of oak (Quercus) native to the mountains of northern Borneo.

== Range and habitat ==
Quercus lowii is native to Malaysian Borneo. It is mostly found in the vicinity of Mount Kinabalu in Sabah state, along with a single location in Sarawak.

Quercus lowii grows in montane rain forest between 1,500 and 2,500 metres elevation. It is typically found on soils derived from ultrabasic rocks.

== Conservation ==
Quercus lowii is affected by habitat loss from deforestation and replacement of its native forests with tree plantations. Its conservation status is assessed as near threatened.

== Taxonomy ==
Quercus lowii is classed in subgenus Cerris, section Cyclobalanopsis. Its specific name, lowii, was given in honour of Hugh Low (1824-1905), the British naturalist who collected the initial specimen.

Historically, it has also been referred to as Cyclobalanopsis lowii.
