= Quercus rupestris =

Conservation status
- Endangered (IUCN 3.1)

Scientific classification
- Kingdom: Plantae
- Clade: Embryophytes
- Clade: Tracheophytes
- Clade: Spermatophytes
- Clade: Angiosperms
- Clade: Eudicots
- Clade: Rosids
- Order: Fagales
- Family: Fagaceae
- Genus: Quercus
- Subgenus: Quercus subg. Cerris
- Section: Quercus sect. Cyclobalanopsis
- Species: Q. rupestris

Binomial name
- Quercus rupestris Hickel & A.Camus

Species of oak tree

Quercus rupestris is a small tree species in the beech family Fagaceae. It is placed in subgenus Cerris, section Cyclobalanopsis.

This is a small tree species, growing to 5–6 m, which appears to be endemic to Vietnam, where it may be called sồi vùng đá. There are no known sub-species.
