= Quercus thomsoniana =

Conservation status
- Critically Endangered (IUCN 3.1)

Scientific classification
- Kingdom: Plantae
- Clade: Embryophytes
- Clade: Tracheophytes
- Clade: Spermatophytes
- Clade: Angiosperms
- Clade: Eudicots
- Clade: Rosids
- Order: Fagales
- Family: Fagaceae
- Genus: Quercus
- Subgenus: Quercus subg. Cerris
- Section: Quercus sect. Cyclobalanopsis
- Species: Q. thomsoniana

Binomial name
- Quercus thomsoniana A.DC.

Synonyms
- Cyclobalanopsis thomsoniana (A.DC.) Oerst.; Quercus kamroopii var. thomsoniana (A.DC.) V.Singh & P.Singh; Quercus lineata var. thomsoniana (A.DC.) Wenz.

Species of flowering plant

Quercus thomsoniana is a species of oak. It is a tree native to Sikkim and Bhutan in the eastern Himalayas and to northern Bangladesh. It grows in montane subtropical forests from 1,800 to 2,400 metres elevation. The species is known from few sites, and the IUCN Red List assesses it as Critically Endangered.

The species was described by Alphonse Pyramus de Candolle in 1894.
