= Quercus stewardiana =

Conservation status
- Least Concern (IUCN 3.1)

Scientific classification
- Kingdom: Plantae
- Clade: Embryophytes
- Clade: Tracheophytes
- Clade: Spermatophytes
- Clade: Angiosperms
- Clade: Eudicots
- Clade: Rosids
- Order: Fagales
- Family: Fagaceae
- Genus: Quercus
- Subgenus: Quercus subg. Cerris
- Section: Quercus sect. Cyclobalanopsis
- Species: Q. stewardiana

Binomial name
- Quercus stewardiana A.Camus

Synonyms
- Cyclobalanopsis stewardiana (A.Camus) Y.C.Hsu & H.Wei Jen; Cyclobalanopsis stewardiana var. longicaudata Y.C.Hsu, P.I.Mao & W.Z.Li

Species of tree

Quercus stewardiana is a species of tree in the beech family Fagaceae. It is widespread across southern China (Anhui, Guangdong, Guangxi, Guizhou, Hubei, Hunan, Jiangxi, Sichuan, Yunnan, Zhejiang). It is placed in subgenus Cerris, section Cyclobalanopsis.

Quercus stewardiana is a tree up to 12 meters tall. Twigs are hairless. Leaves can be as much as 12 cm long, green on the top but white and waxy on the underside.
