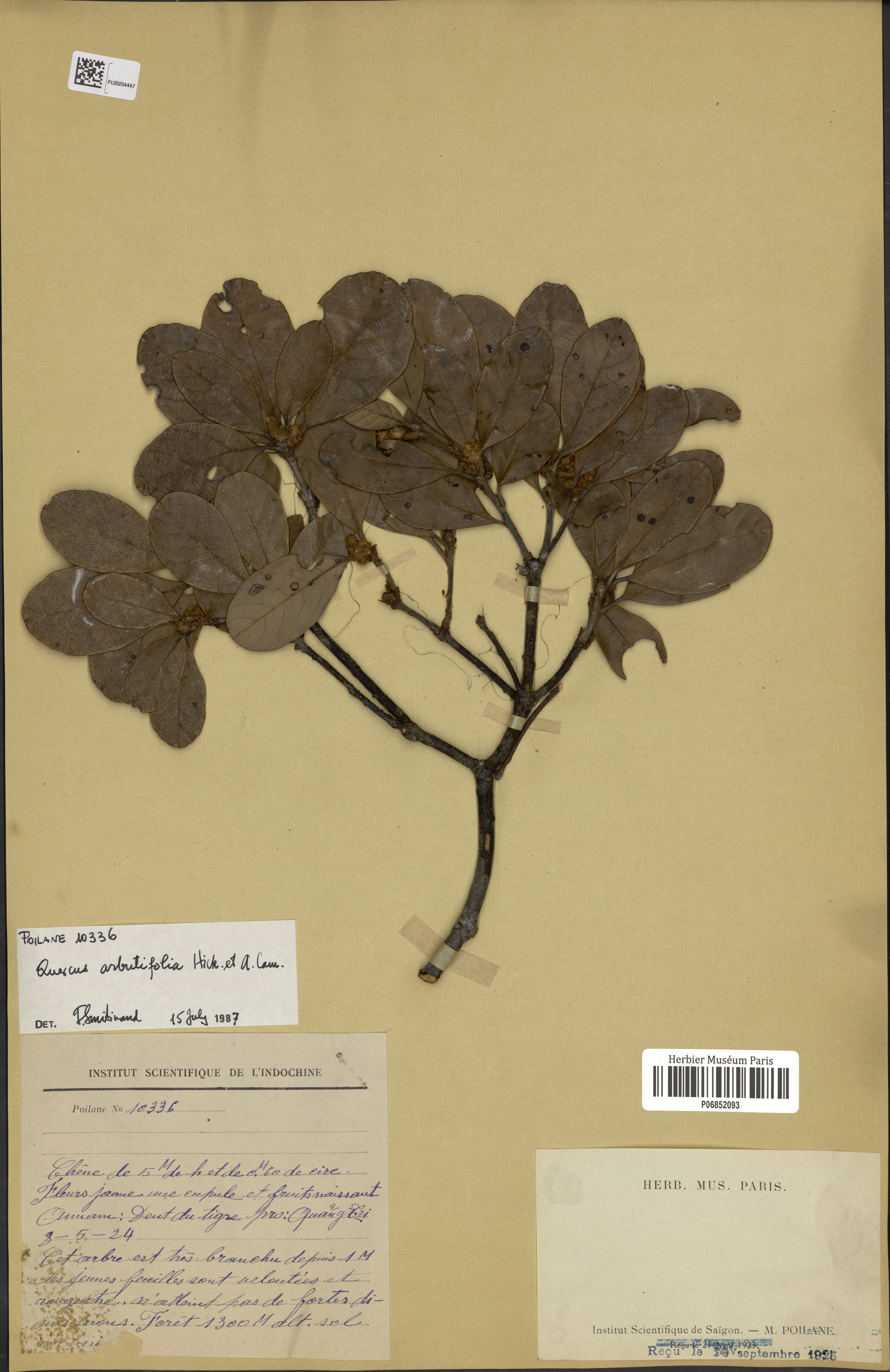

Conservation status
- Endangered (IUCN 3.1)

Scientific classification
- Kingdom: Plantae
- Clade: Embryophytes
- Clade: Tracheophytes
- Clade: Spermatophytes
- Clade: Angiosperms
- Clade: Eudicots
- Clade: Rosids
- Order: Fagales
- Family: Fagaceae
- Genus: Quercus
- Subgenus: Quercus subg. Cerris
- Section: Quercus sect. Cyclobalanopsis
- Species: Q. arbutifolia

Binomial name
- Quercus arbutifolia Hickel & A.Camus

Synonyms
- Cyclobalanopsis obovatifolia (C.C.Huang) Q.F.Zheng; Quercus obovatifolia C.C.Huang

= Quercus arbutifolia =

Species of oak tree

Quercus arbutifolia, synonym Quercus obovatifolia, is a species of oak in the beech family Fagaceae, native to southeast China and Vietnam. It is placed in Quercus sect. Cyclobalanopsis, the ring-cupped oaks. There are no known subspecies.

In Vietnam it may be called sồi lá trôn. It is reported that there are five populations of Quercus arbutifolia in China. But several populations have experienced severe habitat degradation. According to the International Union for Conservation of Nature Red List Categories & Criteria (IUCN 2011), this species qualifies as vulnerable. Both in situ conservation recommendations and ex situ conservation methods are necessary to act as an insurance policy against extinction in the short term, and to aid the recovery and support of self-sustaining wild populations in the long term. Strategies such as controlled breeding, vegetative propagation, plant tissue culture, and micro-cuttings could be implemented as additional complementary techniques to prevent extinction. These strategies may be very effective to overcome the limited fruit production and low germination rate in many Q. arbutifolia populations.
