= Quercus setulosa =

Conservation status
- Least Concern (IUCN 3.1)

Scientific classification
- Kingdom: Plantae
- Clade: Embryophytes
- Clade: Tracheophytes
- Clade: Angiosperms
- Clade: Eudicots
- Clade: Rosids
- Order: Fagales
- Family: Fagaceae
- Genus: Quercus
- Subgenus: Quercus subg. Cerris
- Section: Quercus sect. Ilex
- Species: Q. setulosa

Binomial name
- Quercus setulosa Hickel & A.Camus

Species of oak tree

Quercus setulosa is the accepted name of an oak species in genus Quercus of the family Fagaceae. It is now placed in section Ilex of subgenus Cerris.

== Subspecies and description ==
The Catalogue of Life lists the following:

- Q. setulosa subsp. laotica (A.Camus) Menitsky
- Q. setulosa subsp. setulosa

This oak tree grows up to 30 m tall and has been recorded from Laos and Vietnam (especially the Central Highlands), where it may be called sồi duối.
