= Quercus guyavifolia =

Conservation status
- Least Concern (IUCN 3.1)

Scientific classification
- Kingdom: Plantae
- Clade: Embryophytes
- Clade: Tracheophytes
- Clade: Spermatophytes
- Clade: Angiosperms
- Clade: Eudicots
- Clade: Rosids
- Order: Fagales
- Family: Fagaceae
- Genus: Quercus
- Subgenus: Quercus subg. Cerris
- Section: Quercus sect. Ilex
- Species: Q. guyavifolia

Binomial name
- Quercus guyavifolia H.Lév.

Synonyms
- Quercus aquifolioides var. rufescens (Franch.) Rehder & E.H.Wilson; Quercus ilex var. rufescens Franch.; Quercus pileata Hu & W.C.Cheng; Quercus semecarpifolia var. rufescens (Franch.) Schottky

Species of flowering plant

Quercus guyavifolia is a species of flowering plant in the family Fagaceae, native to south-central China. An evergreen tree reaching 15 m (50 ft), its leaves are golden-brown on their undersides, making it one of the most attractive of the golden oaks. It is placed in section Ilex.
