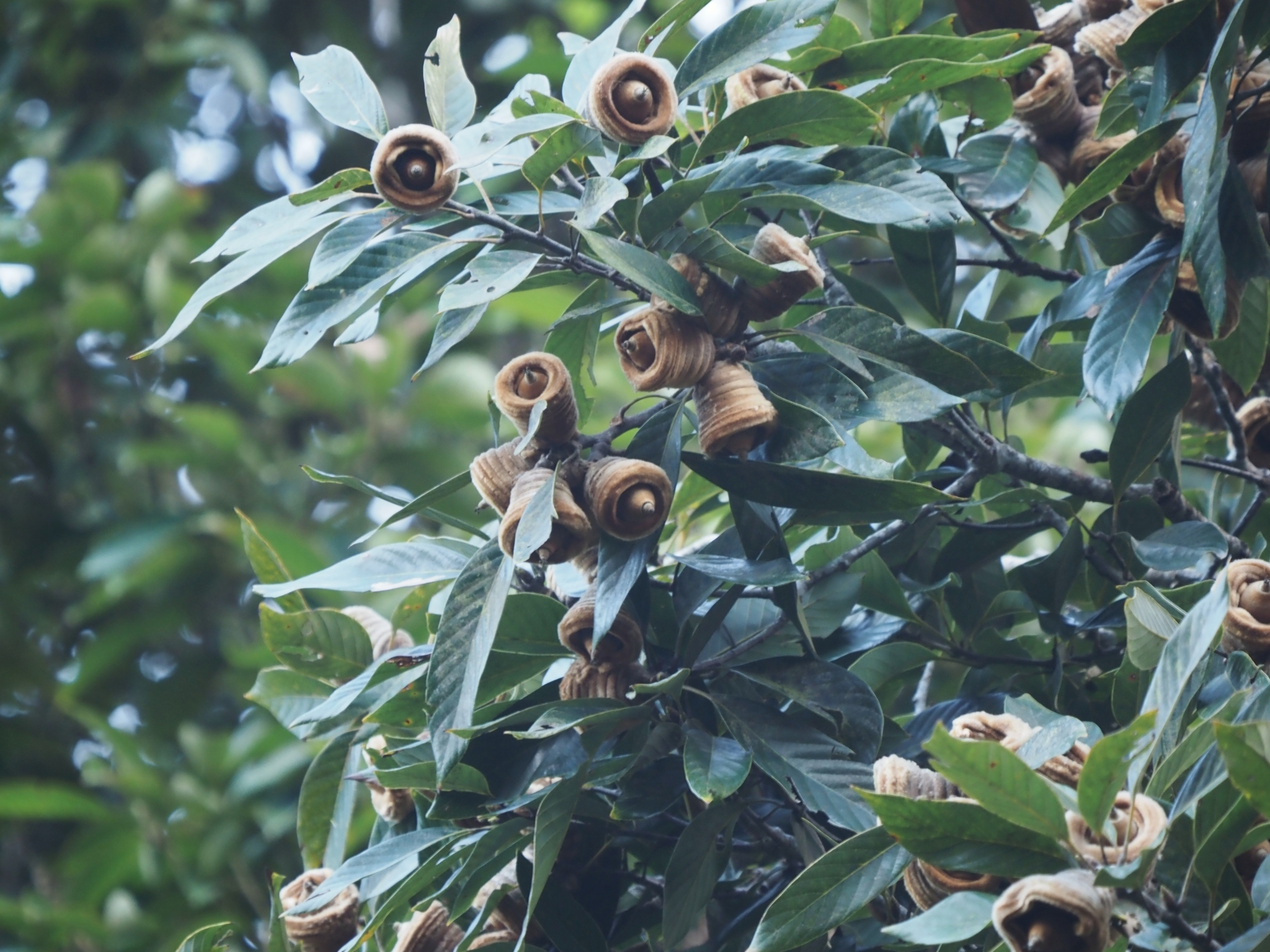

Conservation status
- Least Concern (IUCN 3.1)

Scientific classification
- Kingdom: Plantae
- Clade: Embryophytes
- Clade: Tracheophytes
- Clade: Spermatophytes
- Clade: Angiosperms
- Clade: Eudicots
- Clade: Rosids
- Order: Fagales
- Family: Fagaceae
- Genus: Quercus
- Subgenus: Quercus subg. Cerris
- Section: Quercus sect. Cyclobalanopsis
- Species: Q. macrocalyx

Binomial name
- Quercus macrocalyx Hickel & A.Camus

Synonyms
- Cyclobalanopsis austroyunnanensis Hu; Cyclobalanopsis fleuryi (Hickel & A.Camus) W.T.Chun; Cyclobalanopsis macrocalyx (Hickel & A.Camus) M.Deng & Z.K.Zhou; Cyclobalanopsis nengpulaensis H.Li & Y.C.Hsu; Quercus fleuryi Hickel & A.Camus; Quercus megalocarpa A.Camus; Quercus tsoi Chun ex Menitsky

= Quercus macrocalyx =

Species of oak tree

Quercus macrocalyx is a tree species in the beech family Fagaceae There are no known subspecies. It is placed in subgenus Cerris, section Cyclobalanopsis.

This oak tree grows up to 20 m tall. It is native to northern Indochina (Myanmar, Laos, and Vietnam), Tibet, and southern China including Hainan. In Vietnam it may be called sồi đấu to.
