= Quercus gambleana =

Conservation status
- Least Concern (IUCN 3.1)

Scientific classification
- Kingdom: Plantae
- Clade: Embryophytes
- Clade: Tracheophytes
- Clade: Spermatophytes
- Clade: Angiosperms
- Clade: Eudicots
- Clade: Rosids
- Order: Fagales
- Family: Fagaceae
- Genus: Quercus
- Subgenus: Quercus subg. Cerris
- Section: Quercus sect. Cyclobalanopsis
- Species: Q. gambleana

Binomial name
- Quercus gambleana A.Camus 1933

Synonyms
- Cyclobalanopsis gambleana (A. Camus) Y.C. Hsu & H.Wei Jen; Cyclobalanopsis oxyodon var. tomentosa Hu

Species of tree

Quercus gambleana is a species of tree in the beech family Fagaceae. It has been found in northeastern India and southwestern China (Guizhou, Hubei, Sichuan, Tibet, Yunnan). It is placed in subgenus Cerris, section Cyclobalanopsis.

Quercus gambleana is a tree which grows to 20 meters (66 ft) tall. Leaves can be as much as 20 cm long (7.9 in).
