= Quercus chevalieri =

Conservation status
- Data Deficient (IUCN 3.1)

Scientific classification
- Kingdom: Plantae
- Clade: Embryophytes
- Clade: Tracheophytes
- Clade: Spermatophytes
- Clade: Angiosperms
- Clade: Eudicots
- Clade: Rosids
- Order: Fagales
- Family: Fagaceae
- Genus: Quercus
- Subgenus: Quercus subg. Cerris
- Section: Quercus sect. Cyclobalanopsis
- Species: Q. chevalieri

Binomial name
- Quercus chevalieri Hickel & A.Camus

Synonyms
- Cyclobalanopsis chevalieri (Hickel & A.Camus) Y.C.Hsu & H.Wei Jen

Species of oak tree

Quercus chevalieri is an uncommon species of tree in the beech family Fagaceae. It has been found in Vietnam and also in southern China, in the Provinces of Guangdong, Guangxi, and Yunnan. It is placed in subgenus Cerris, section Cyclobalanopsis.

Quercus chevalieri is a tree up to 20 m. tall with leaves as much as 110 mm long. The acorn is ovoid to oblong-ellipsoid, 10-15 (sometimes 20) × 6-8 (sometimes 15) mm, glabrous; the scar is approx. 5 mm in diameter.

Some authors have misapplied this name to another plant, Cyclobalanopsis augustinii var. nigrinux (H.H. Hu) M. Deng & Z.K. Zhou.
