= Quercus lungmaiensis =

Conservation status
- Critically Endangered (IUCN 3.1)

Scientific classification
- Kingdom: Plantae
- Clade: Embryophytes
- Clade: Tracheophytes
- Clade: Spermatophytes
- Clade: Angiosperms
- Clade: Eudicots
- Clade: Rosids
- Order: Fagales
- Family: Fagaceae
- Genus: Quercus
- Subgenus: Quercus subg. Cerris
- Section: Quercus sect. Cyclobalanopsis
- Species: Q. lungmaiensis

Binomial name
- Quercus lungmaiensis (H.H.Hu) C.C.Huang & Y.T.Chang 1992

Synonyms
- Cyclobalanopsis austroglauca Y.T.Chang; Cyclobalanopsis fulviseriaca Y.C.Hsu & D.M.Wang; Cyclobalanopsis lungmaiensis Hu 1951; Quercus austroglauca (Y.T.Chang) Y.T.Chang; Quercus fulviseriaca (Y.C.Hsu & D.M.Wang) Z.K.Zhou

Species of oak tree

Quercus lungmaiensis is an Asian species of oak. It is a tree native to limestone mountains on the border of Yunnan and Guangxi provinces in southern China, where it grows in subtropical moist forests from 1100 to 1300 metres elevation. It is placed in subgenus Cerris, section Cyclobalanopsis.

Quercus lungmaiensis is a large tree up to 30 meters tall. Leaves can be as much as 11.5 cm long.
