= Quercus austrocochinchinensis =

Conservation status
- Vulnerable (IUCN 3.1)

Scientific classification
- Kingdom: Plantae
- Clade: Embryophytes
- Clade: Tracheophytes
- Clade: Spermatophytes
- Clade: Angiosperms
- Clade: Eudicots
- Clade: Rosids
- Order: Fagales
- Family: Fagaceae
- Genus: Quercus
- Subgenus: Quercus subg. Cerris
- Section: Quercus sect. Cyclobalanopsis
- Species: Q. austrocochinchinensis

Binomial name
- Quercus austrocochinchinensis Hickel & A.Camus

Synonyms
- Cyclobalanopsis austrocochinchinensis (Hickel & A.Camus) Hjelmq.; Cyclobalanopsis austro-cochinchinensis (Hickel & A.Camus) Hjelmq.; Quercus austro-cochinchinensis Hickel & A.Camus

Species of oak tree

Quercus austrocochinchinensis is an uncommon species of tree in the beech family Fagaceae. It has been found in Vietnam and Thailand as well as Yunnan Province in southern China. It is placed in subgenus Cerris, section Cyclobalanopsis.

Quercus austrocochinchinensis is a tree up to 15 m. tall, with brown twigs and leaves as much as 200 mm long. The acorn is oblate, 11-14 × 13-18 mm, angular, yellowish-brown tomentose, with rounded apex; the scar is approx. 12 mm in diameter.
