= Quercus sichourensis =

Conservation status
- Critically Endangered (IUCN 3.1)

Scientific classification
- Kingdom: Plantae
- Clade: Embryophytes
- Clade: Tracheophytes
- Clade: Spermatophytes
- Clade: Angiosperms
- Clade: Eudicots
- Clade: Rosids
- Order: Fagales
- Family: Fagaceae
- Genus: Quercus
- Subgenus: Quercus subg. Cerris
- Section: Quercus sect. Cyclobalanopsis
- Species: Q. sichourensis

Binomial name
- Quercus sichourensis (Hu) C.C.Huang & Y.T.Chang

Synonyms
- Cyclobalanopsis sichourensis Hu

Species of tree

Quercus sichourensis is a species of oak found only in southeastern Yunnan Province in China. It is placed in subgenus Cerris, section Cyclobalanopsis.

Quercus sichourensis is an evergreen trees up to 20 m tall. Leaves are thick and leathery, elliptical or oblong, up to 21 cm long, bright green on the top but whitish on the underside.
