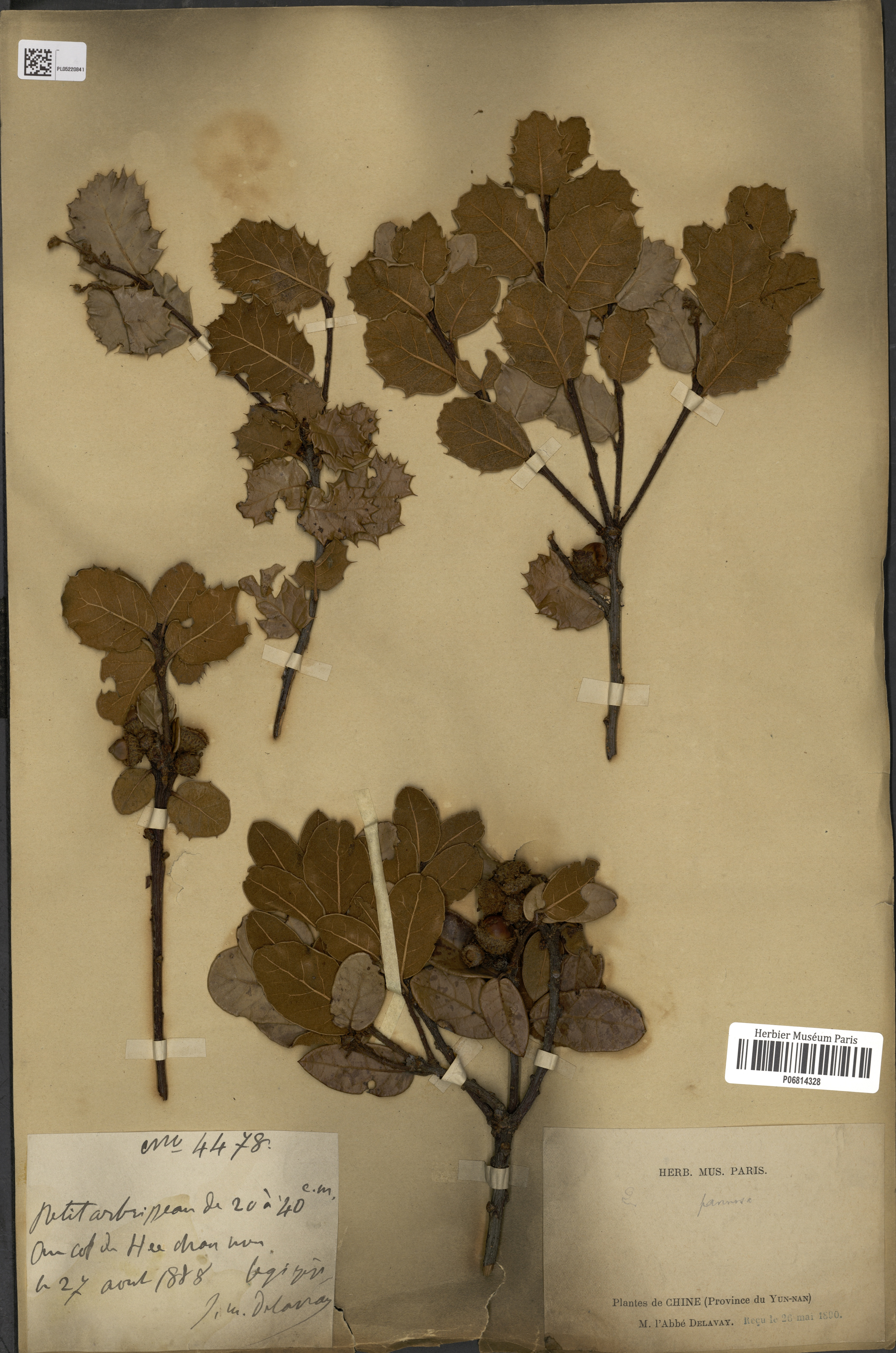

Conservation status
- Least Concern (IUCN 3.1)

Scientific classification
- Kingdom: Plantae
- Clade: Embryophytes
- Clade: Tracheophytes
- Clade: Spermatophytes
- Clade: Angiosperms
- Clade: Eudicots
- Clade: Rosids
- Order: Fagales
- Family: Fagaceae
- Genus: Quercus
- Subgenus: Quercus subg. Cerris
- Section: Quercus sect. Ilex
- Species: Q. pannosa

Binomial name
- Quercus pannosa Hand.-Mazz.

= Quercus pannosa =

Species of plant

Quercus pannosa is a species of oak native to Sichuan and Yunnan provinces of south-central China. An evergreen tree or shrub, it is found at very high elevations, flourishing at up to 4,270 metres (14,010 feet) above sea level. It is classified in subgenus Cerris, section Ilex.
