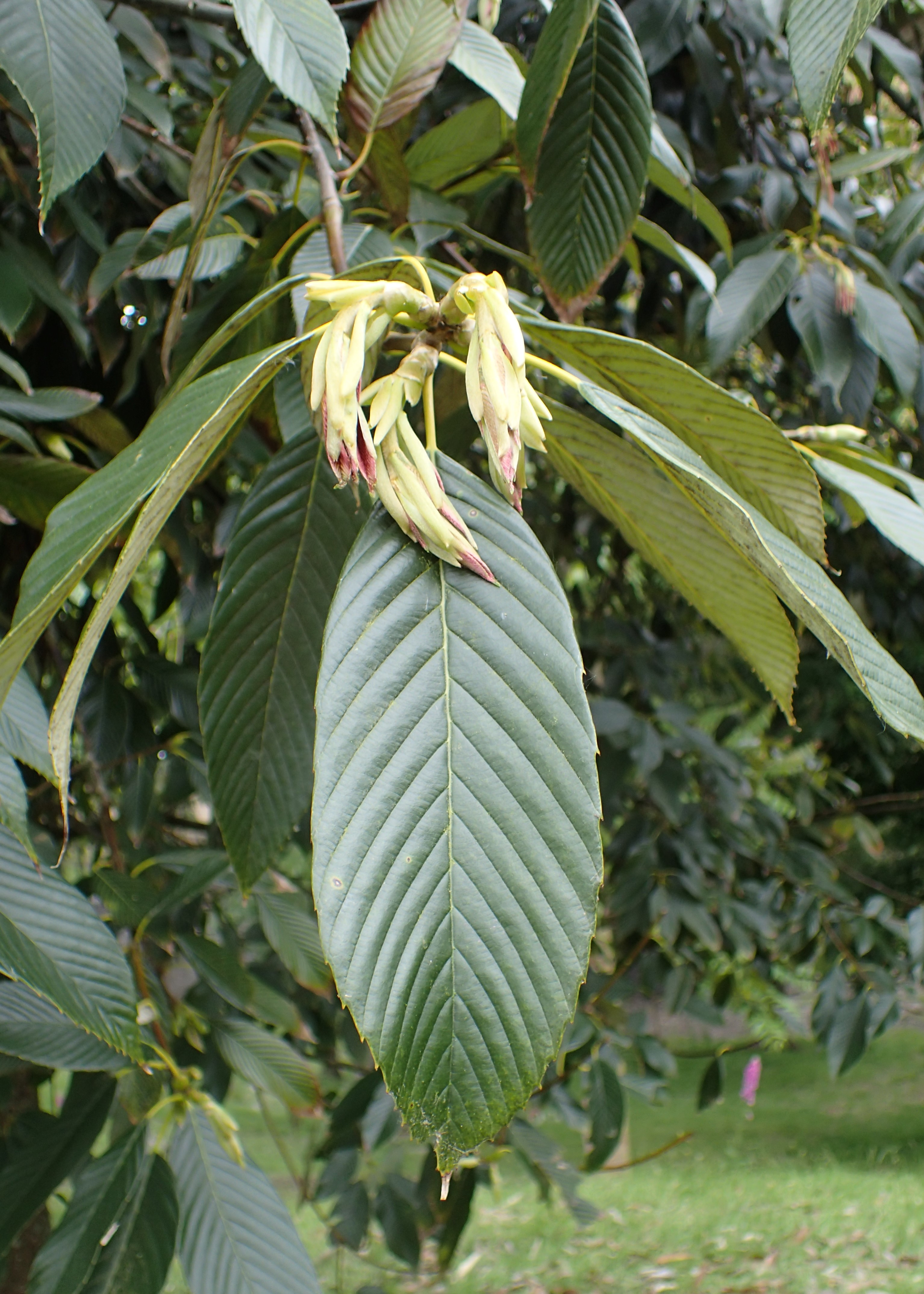

Conservation status
- Least Concern (IUCN 3.1)

Scientific classification
- Kingdom: Plantae
- Clade: Embryophytes
- Clade: Tracheophytes
- Clade: Spermatophytes
- Clade: Angiosperms
- Clade: Eudicots
- Clade: Rosids
- Order: Fagales
- Family: Fagaceae
- Genus: Quercus
- Subgenus: Quercus subg. Cerris
- Section: Quercus sect. Cyclobalanopsis
- Species: Q. rex

Binomial name
- Quercus rex Hemsl.

Synonyms
- Cyclobalanopsis fructiseptata (A.Camus) Hjelmq.; Cyclobalanopsis rex (Hemsl.) Schottky; Quercus dussaudii Hickel & A.Camus; Quercus fructiseptata A.Camus; Quercus subumbilicata A.Camus

= Quercus rex =

Species of oak tree

Quercus rex is an Asian species of tree in the family Fagaceae. It has been found in the seasonal tropical forests of northern Indochina (Laos, Myanmar, Vietnam), northeastern India, and also in the province of Yunnan in southwestern China. It is placed in subgenus Cerris, section Cyclobalanopsis.

Quercus rex is a large tree up to 30 m. tall. Twigs are pale brown with a woolly coating of hairs. Leaves can be as much as 270 mm long. The acorn is oblate, 25-35 × 35–50 mm, pale greyish-orange and tomentose when young; the apex is rounded to impressed; the scar is 20–25 mm in diameter and depressed. In China, flowering is in April–May, acorns are found from October–November.
