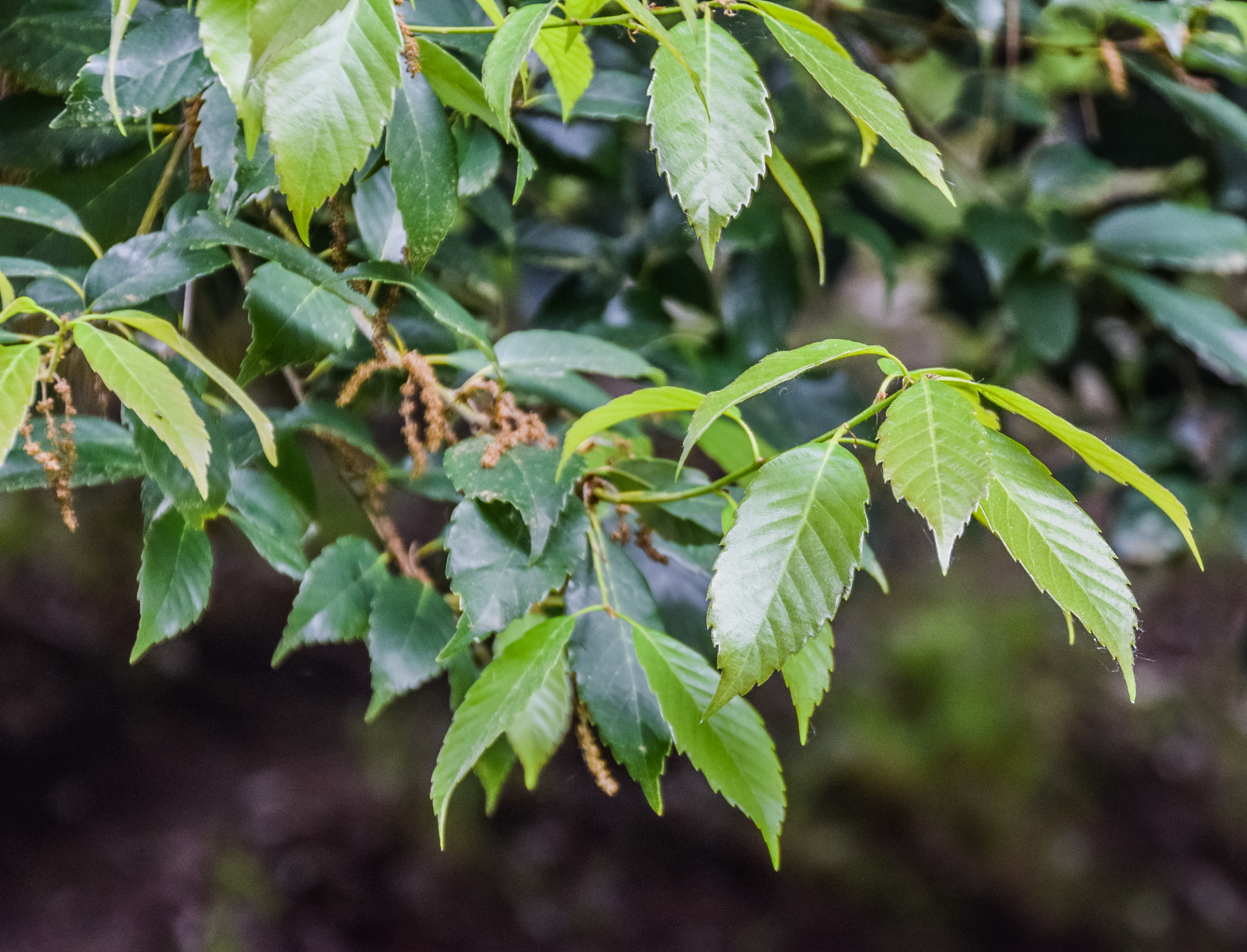

Conservation status
- Least Concern (IUCN 3.1)

Scientific classification
- Kingdom: Plantae
- Clade: Embryophytes
- Clade: Tracheophytes
- Clade: Spermatophytes
- Clade: Angiosperms
- Clade: Eudicots
- Clade: Rosids
- Order: Fagales
- Family: Fagaceae
- Genus: Quercus
- Subgenus: Quercus subg. Cerris
- Section: Quercus sect. Cyclobalanopsis
- Species: Q. annulata

Binomial name
- Quercus annulata Sm.

Synonyms
- Cyclobalanopsis annulata (Sm.) Oerst.; Quercus glauca subsp. annulata (Sm.) A.Camus; Quercus phullata Buch.-Ham. ex D.Don

= Quercus annulata =

Species of oak tree

Quercus annulata is a tree species in the beech family Fagaceae. There are no known subspecies. It is placed in subgenus Cerris, section Cyclobalanopsis.

This oak tree has oblong, caudate leaves, 100–120 mm with glaucous undersides. It has been recorded from the Himalayas to south-central China, Myanmar, and Vietnam: the latter in the Phan Xi Păng area, where it may be called sồi vòng.
