= Quercus quangtriensis =

Conservation status
- Vulnerable (IUCN 3.1)

Scientific classification
- Kingdom: Plantae
- Clade: Embryophytes
- Clade: Tracheophytes
- Clade: Spermatophytes
- Clade: Angiosperms
- Clade: Eudicots
- Clade: Rosids
- Order: Fagales
- Family: Fagaceae
- Genus: Quercus
- Subgenus: Quercus subg. Cerris
- Section: Quercus sect. Cyclobalanopsis
- Species: Q. quangtriensis

Binomial name
- Quercus quangtriensis Hickel & A.Camus

Synonyms
- Quercus longistyla Barnett; Quercus wangsaiensis Barnett

Species of oak tree

Quercus quangtriensis is a tree species in the beech family Fagaceae. It is native to Myanmar, Thailand, and Vietnam. there are no known subspecies. It is placed in subgenus Cerris, section Cyclobalanopsis.

This oak tree grows up to 25 m tall and has been recorded from Vietnam, where it may be called sồi Quảng Trị (after the name of that Province).
