= Quercus platycalyx =

Conservation status
- Data Deficient (IUCN 3.1)

Scientific classification
- Kingdom: Plantae
- Clade: Embryophytes
- Clade: Tracheophytes
- Clade: Spermatophytes
- Clade: Angiosperms
- Clade: Eudicots
- Clade: Rosids
- Order: Fagales
- Family: Fagaceae
- Genus: Quercus
- Subgenus: Quercus subg. Cerris
- Section: Quercus sect. Cyclobalanopsis
- Species: Q. platycalyx

Binomial name
- Quercus platycalyx Hickel & A.Camus

Species of flowering plant

Quercus platycalyx is a species of oak. It is a tree native to Vietnam.

The species was described by Paul Robert Hickel and Aimée Antoinette Camus in 1921.
