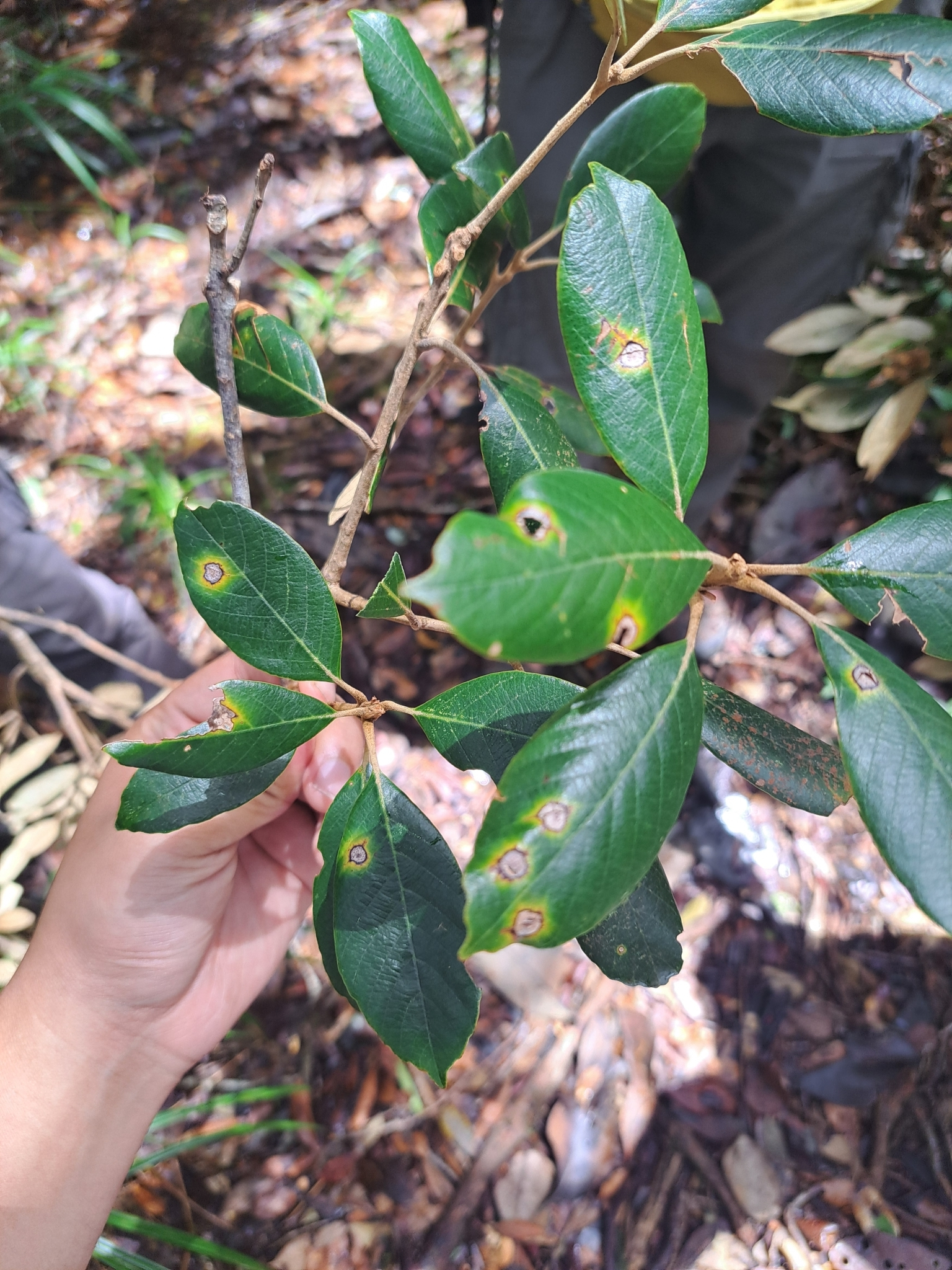
- Quercus poilanei in Lam Dong, Vietnam

Conservation status
- Least Concern (IUCN 3.1)

Scientific classification
- Kingdom: Plantae
- Clade: Embryophytes
- Clade: Tracheophytes
- Clade: Spermatophytes
- Clade: Angiosperms
- Clade: Eudicots
- Clade: Rosids
- Order: Fagales
- Family: Fagaceae
- Genus: Quercus
- Subgenus: Quercus subg. Cerris
- Section: Quercus sect. Cyclobalanopsis
- Species: Q. poilanei

Binomial name
- Quercus poilanei Hickel & A.Camus

Synonyms
- Cyclobalanopsis poilanei (Hickel & A.Camus) Hjelmq.; Quercus flavescens Hickel & A.Camus

= Quercus poilanei =

Species of oak tree

Quercus poilanei is an Asian species of tree in the family Fagaceae. It has been found in northern Indochina (Thailand and Vietnam) and also in the Province of Guangxi in southern China. It is placed in subgenus Cerris, section Cyclobalanopsis.

Quercus poilanei is a tree up to 16 m. tall. Twigs are orange-brown with a felty coating of hairs. Leaves can be as much as 80 mm long. The acorn is ovoid-ellipsoid or globose, 15-20 × 13–15 mm, with a scar 5–7 mm in diameter.
