= Quercus kerangasensis =

Conservation status
- Vulnerable (IUCN 3.1)

Scientific classification
- Kingdom: Plantae
- Clade: Embryophytes
- Clade: Tracheophytes
- Clade: Spermatophytes
- Clade: Angiosperms
- Clade: Eudicots
- Clade: Rosids
- Order: Fagales
- Family: Fagaceae
- Genus: Quercus
- Subgenus: Quercus subg. Cerris
- Section: Quercus sect. Cyclobalanopsis
- Species: Q. kerangasensis

Binomial name
- Quercus kerangasensis Soepadmo (1968)

Species of plant

Quercus kerangasensis is a species of oak native to Borneo. It is placed in Quercus subgenus Cerris, section Cyclobalanopsis.

== Range and habitat ==
Quercus kerangasensis is endemic to the island of Borneo, where it is found in Brunei, the Malaysian state of Sarawak, and central Kalimantan in Indonesian Borneo.

It grows in floodplain primary conifer forests, and in Sarawak it grows in heath forests (also known as kerangas forests), from sea level up to 400 meters elevation.

== Conservation ==
Quercus kerangasensis is threatened with habitat loss from widespread deforestation across its range.
