= Quercus merrillii =

Conservation status
- Vulnerable (IUCN 3.1)

Scientific classification
- Kingdom: Plantae
- Clade: Embryophytes
- Clade: Tracheophytes
- Clade: Spermatophytes
- Clade: Angiosperms
- Clade: Eudicots
- Clade: Rosids
- Order: Fagales
- Family: Fagaceae
- Genus: Quercus
- Subgenus: Quercus subg. Cerris
- Section: Quercus sect. Cyclobalanopsis
- Species: Q. merrillii

Binomial name
- Quercus merrillii Seemen 1908

Synonyms
- Cyclobalanopsis merrillii (Seemen) Schottky

Species of shrub

Quercus merrillii is an Asian species of shrubs in the beech family Fagaceae. It has been found on the Island of Palawan in southwestern Philippines and also in the Malaysian parts of the nearby Island of Borneo (both Sarawak and Sabah). It is placed in subgenus Cerris, section Cyclobalanopsis.

== Description ==
Quercus merrillii is a shrub up to 2 meters tall. Twigs are dark brown. Leaves narrowly egg-shaped, up to 4 cm long and 2 cm wide.

== Range and habitat ==
Quercus merillii is known from only a few locations in Borneo – Sabah and Sarawak states of Malaysia, and Kalimantan in Indonesia – and on Palawan in the Philippines, where it grows in lowland dipterocarp forests.

Its lowland forests habitats are threatened habitat loss from timber harvesting and conversion to agriculture.
