= Quercus pseudoverticillata =

Conservation status
- Critically Endangered (IUCN 3.1)

Scientific classification
- Kingdom: Plantae
- Clade: Embryophytes
- Clade: Tracheophytes
- Clade: Spermatophytes
- Clade: Angiosperms
- Clade: Eudicots
- Clade: Rosids
- Order: Fagales
- Family: Fagaceae
- Genus: Quercus
- Subgenus: Quercus subg. Cerris
- Section: Quercus sect. Cyclobalanopsis
- Species: Q. pseudoverticillata

Binomial name
- Quercus pseudoverticillata Soepadmo (1966)

Rare species of oak

Quercus pseudoverticillata is a rare species of oak in the family Fagaceae. It is endemic to Mount Kinabalu on Borneo.

Quercus pseudoverticillata is known from a single location on Mount Kinabalu, in Malaysia's Sabah state in northeastern Borneo. It lives in montane rain forest between 1,280 and 1,650 metres elevation.

The species' conservation status is assessed as Critically endangered. It is rare within its small range, and may be extinct.
