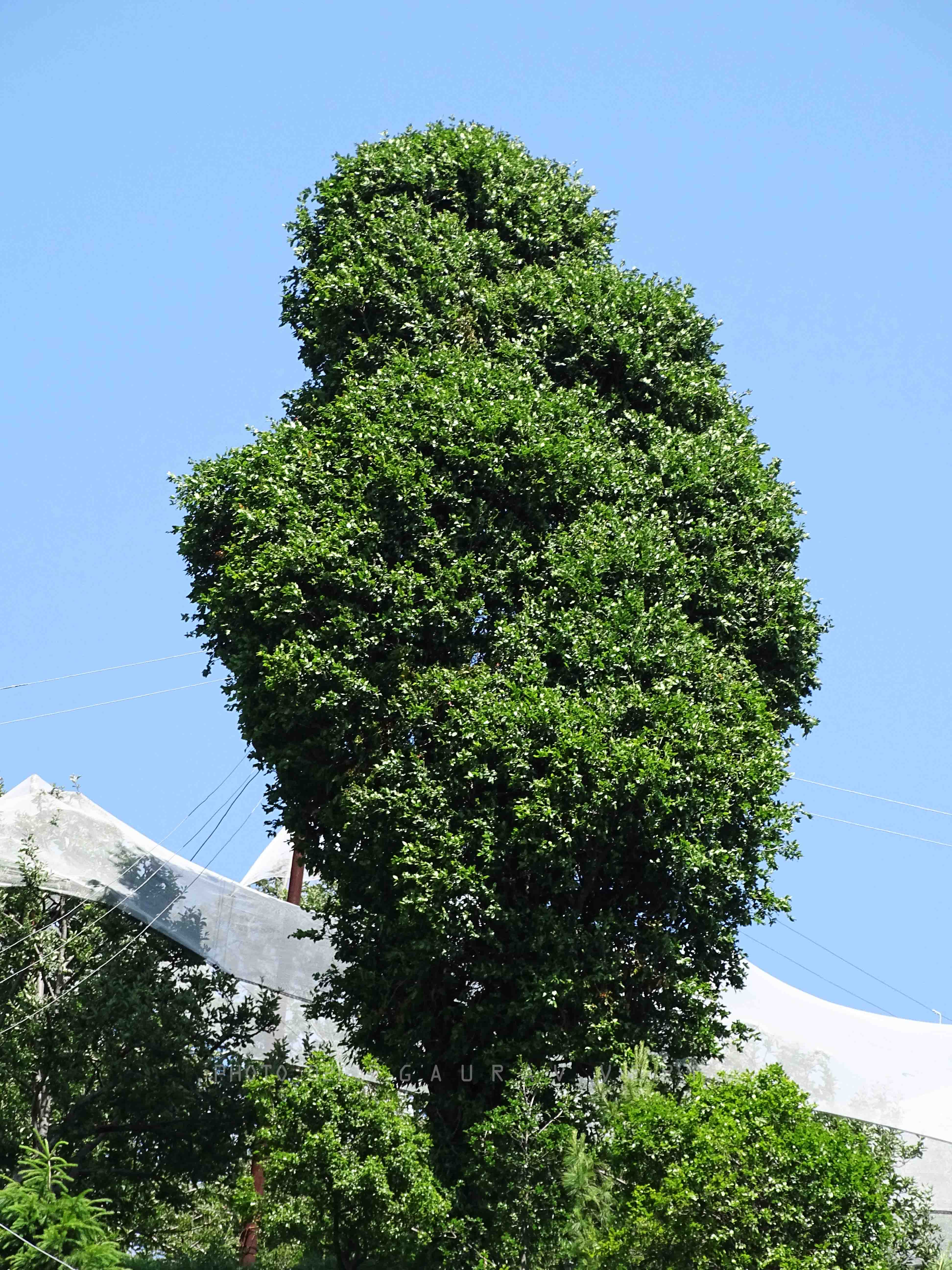
- Quercus floribunda growth form

Conservation status
- Least Concern (IUCN 3.1)

Scientific classification
- Kingdom: Plantae
- Clade: Embryophytes
- Clade: Tracheophytes
- Clade: Spermatophytes
- Clade: Angiosperms
- Clade: Eudicots
- Clade: Rosids
- Order: Fagales
- Family: Fagaceae
- Genus: Quercus
- Subgenus: Quercus subg. Cerris
- Section: Quercus sect. Ilex
- Species: Q. floribunda

Binomial name
- Quercus floribunda Lindl. ex A.Camus

Synonyms
- Quercus dilatata Royle; Quercus himalayana Bahadur

= Quercus floribunda =

Species of flowering plant

Quercus floribunda, called the Moru oak or Mohru oak, Tilonj oak and green oak, is a species of oak native to Afghanistan, Pakistan, India's western Himalaya, and Nepal, typically found from 2,000 to 3,000 metres (6,600 to 9,800 feet) above sea level. It is in the subgenus Cerris, section Ilex. An evergreen tree with a dense crown reaching 30 m (98 ft), it is an important fuelwood and fodder species.

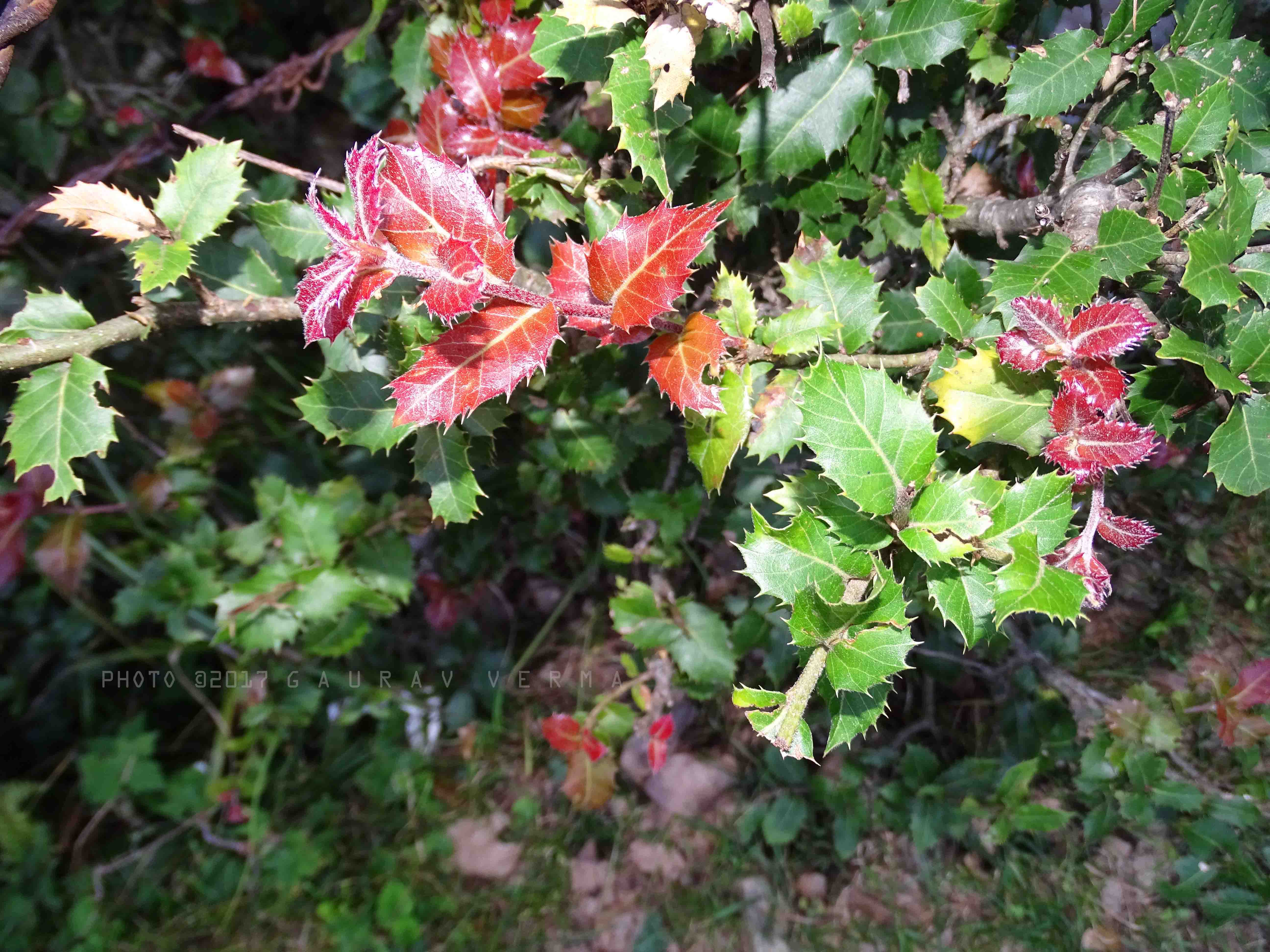
Young leaves are red.

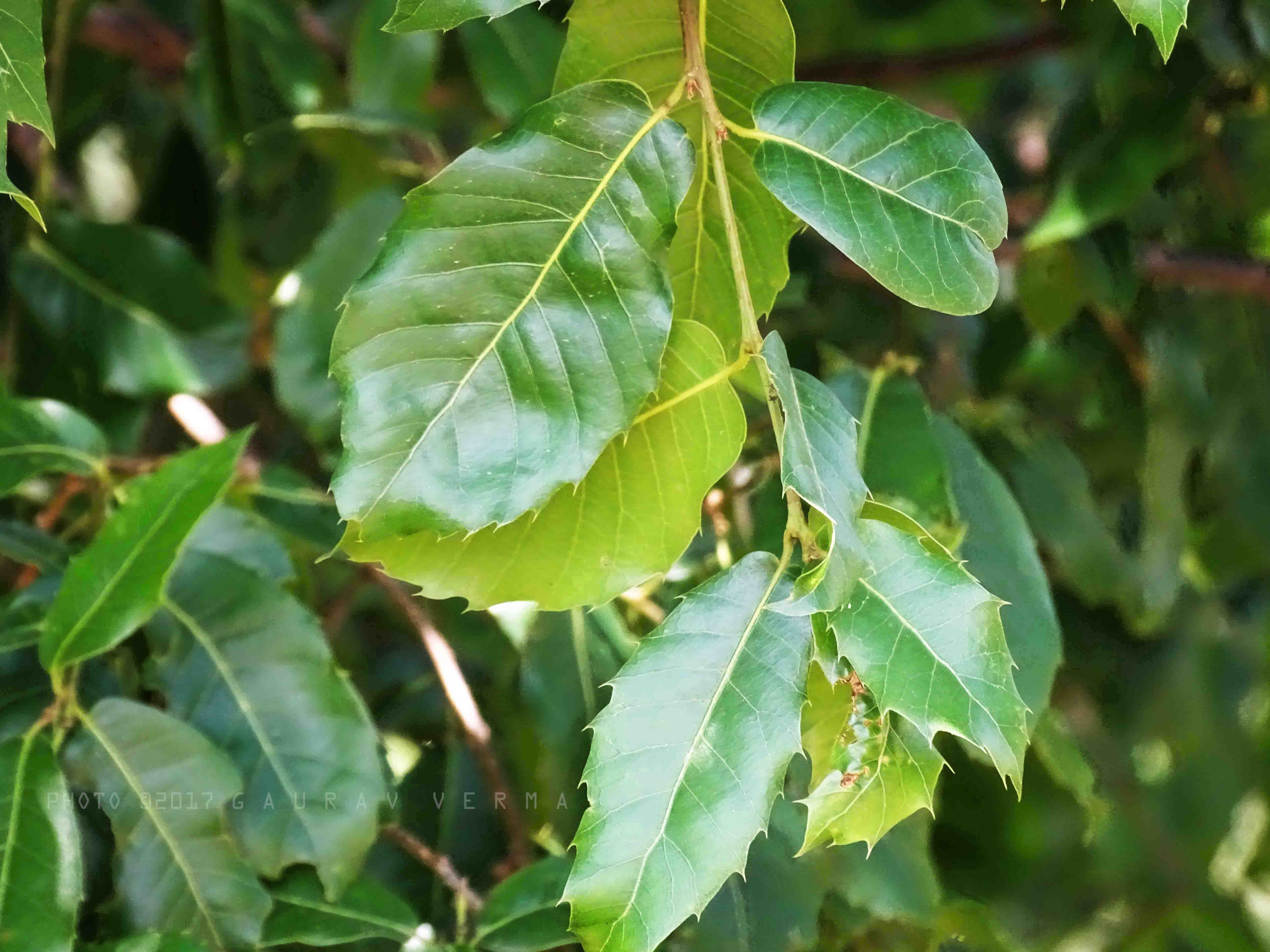
Variety in leaf shape

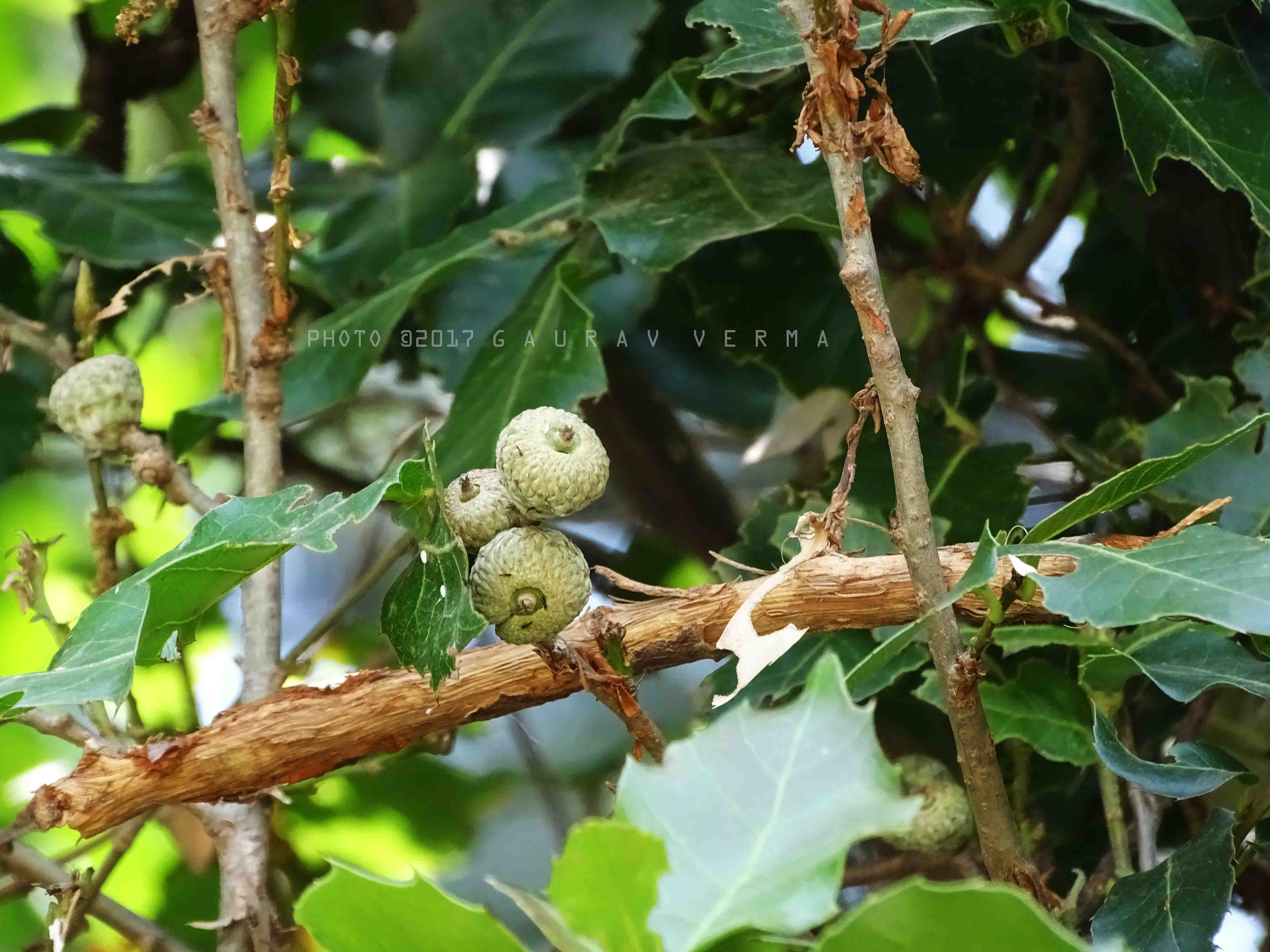
Acorns

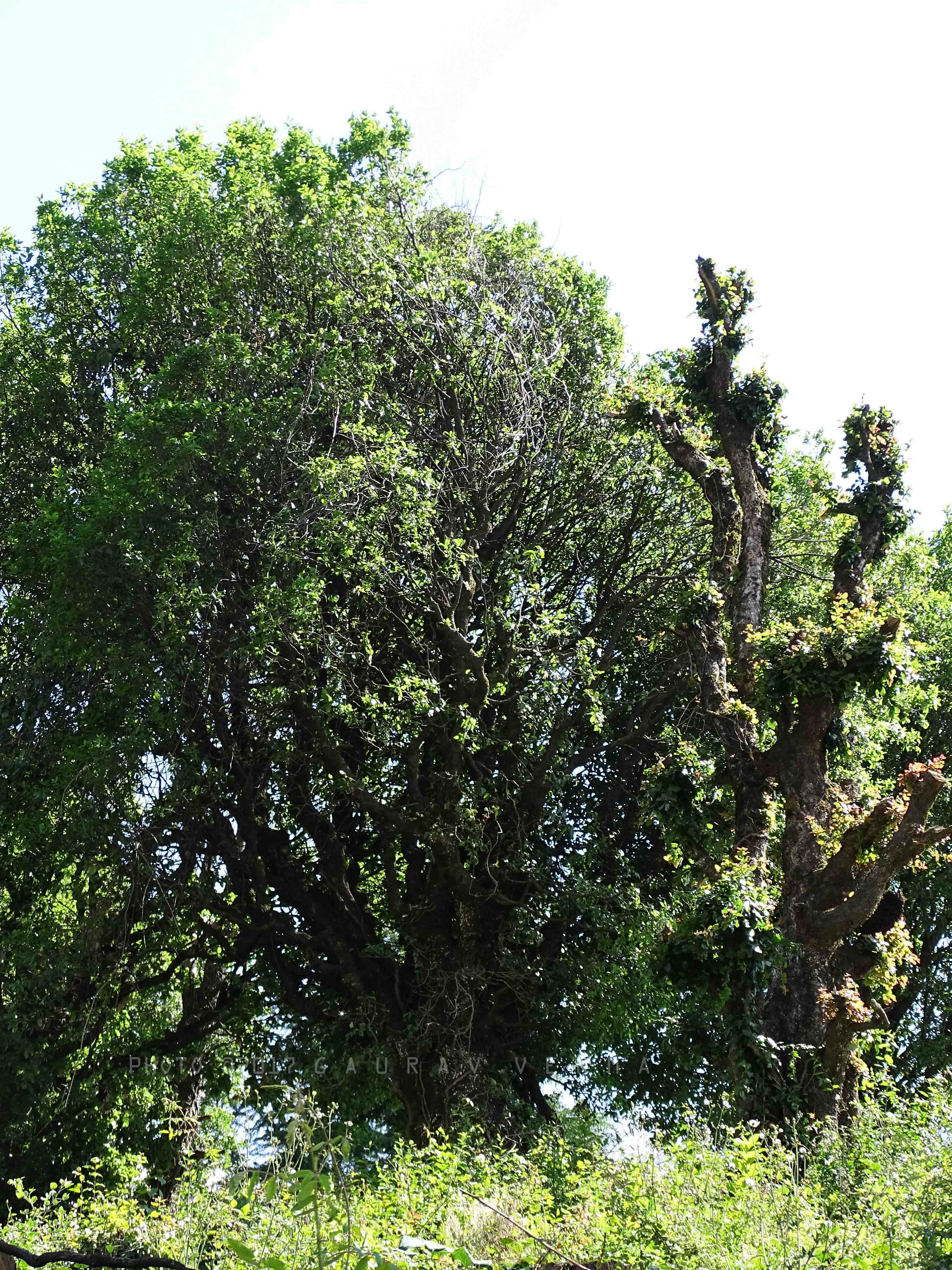
Pollarded for charcoal or fodder production
