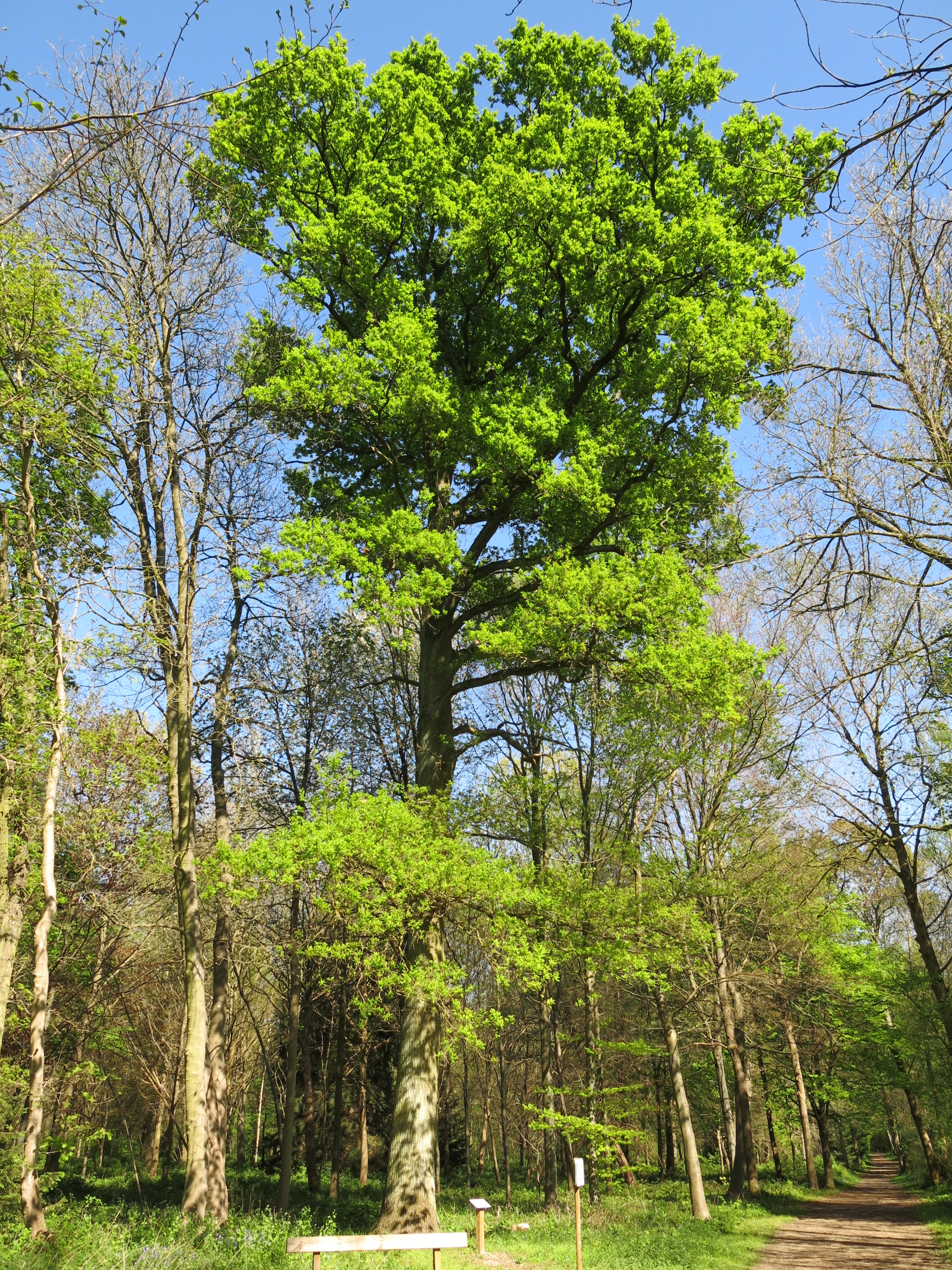

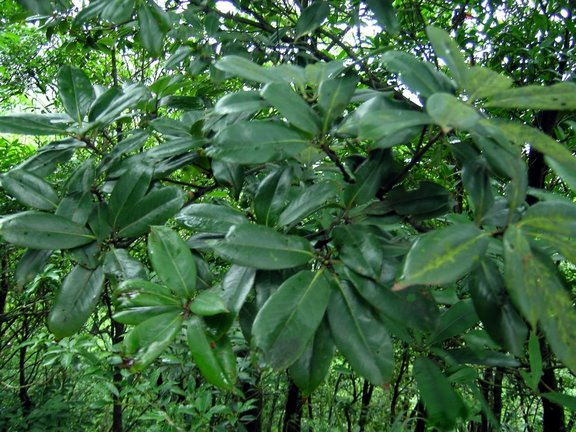

Conservation status
- Least Concern (IUCN 3.1)

Scientific classification
- Kingdom: Plantae
- Clade: Embryophytes
- Clade: Tracheophytes
- Clade: Spermatophytes
- Clade: Angiosperms
- Clade: Eudicots
- Clade: Rosids
- Order: Fagales
- Family: Fagaceae
- Genus: Quercus
- Subgenus: Quercus subg. Cerris
- Section: Quercus sect. Cyclobalanopsis
- Species: Q. sessilifolia

Binomial name
- Quercus sessilifolia Blume

Synonyms
- List: Cyclobalanopsis nubium (Hand.-Mazz.) Chun; Cyclobalanopsis paucidentata Kudô & Masam.; Cyclobalanopsis sessilifolia (Blume) Schottky; Pasania sessilifolia (Blume) Oerst.; Quercus chingii F.P.Metcalf; Quercus nubium Hand.-Mazz.; Quercus paucidentata Franch. ex Nakai

= Quercus sessilifolia =

Species of oak tree

Quercus sessilifolia is an Asian species of trees in the beech family Fagaceae. It is widespread across Japan, Taiwan, much of southern China (Anhui, Fujian, Guangdong, Guangxi, Guizhou, Hubei, Hunan, Jiangsu, Jiangxi, Sichuan, and Zhejiang provinces), and southeastern Thailand. It is placed in subgenus Cerris, section Cyclobalanopsis.

Quercus sessilifolia is a tree up to 25 meters tall. Twigs are waxy. Leaves can be as much as 15 cm long, thick and leathery.
