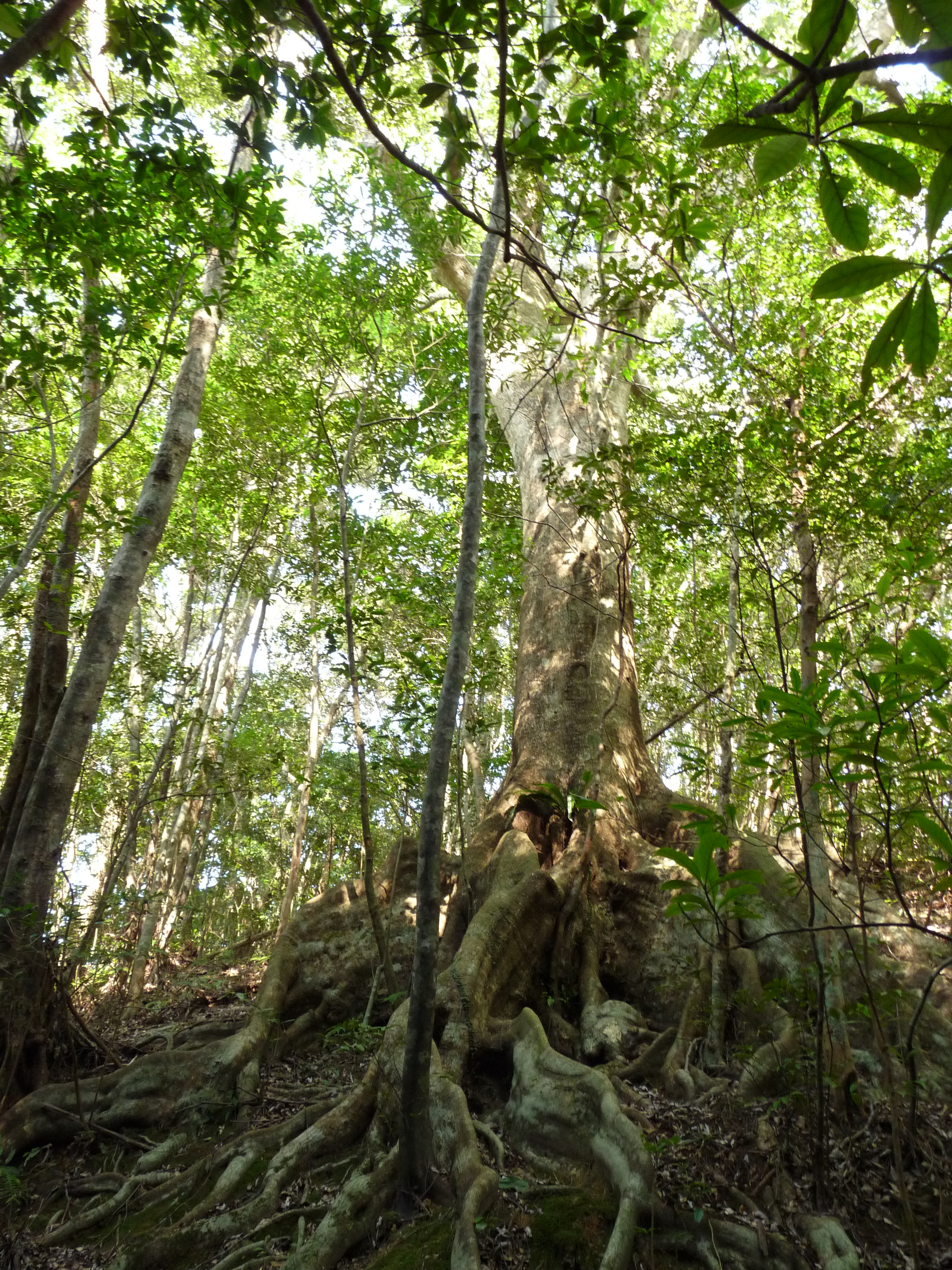

Conservation status
- Least Concern (IUCN 3.1)

Scientific classification
- Kingdom: Plantae
- Clade: Embryophytes
- Clade: Tracheophytes
- Clade: Spermatophytes
- Clade: Angiosperms
- Clade: Eudicots
- Clade: Rosids
- Order: Fagales
- Family: Fagaceae
- Genus: Quercus
- Subgenus: Quercus subg. Cerris
- Section: Quercus sect. Cyclobalanopsis
- Species: Q. miyagii

Binomial name
- Quercus miyagii Koidz.

Synonyms
- Cyclobalanopsis miyagii (Koidz.) Kudô & Masam.; Cyclobalanopsis yayeyamensis (Koidz.) Kudô & Masam.; Quercus yayamensis Koidz.

= Quercus miyagii =

Species of flowering plant

Quercus miyagii is a species of oak native to the Ryukyu Islands. It is placed in subgenus Cerris, section Cyclobalanopsis.

A tree typically 12 metres (39 feet) tall, its acorns are consumed by the freshwater crabs Geothelphusa grandiovata and Candidiopotamon okinawense, which gather them and store them in their burrows.
