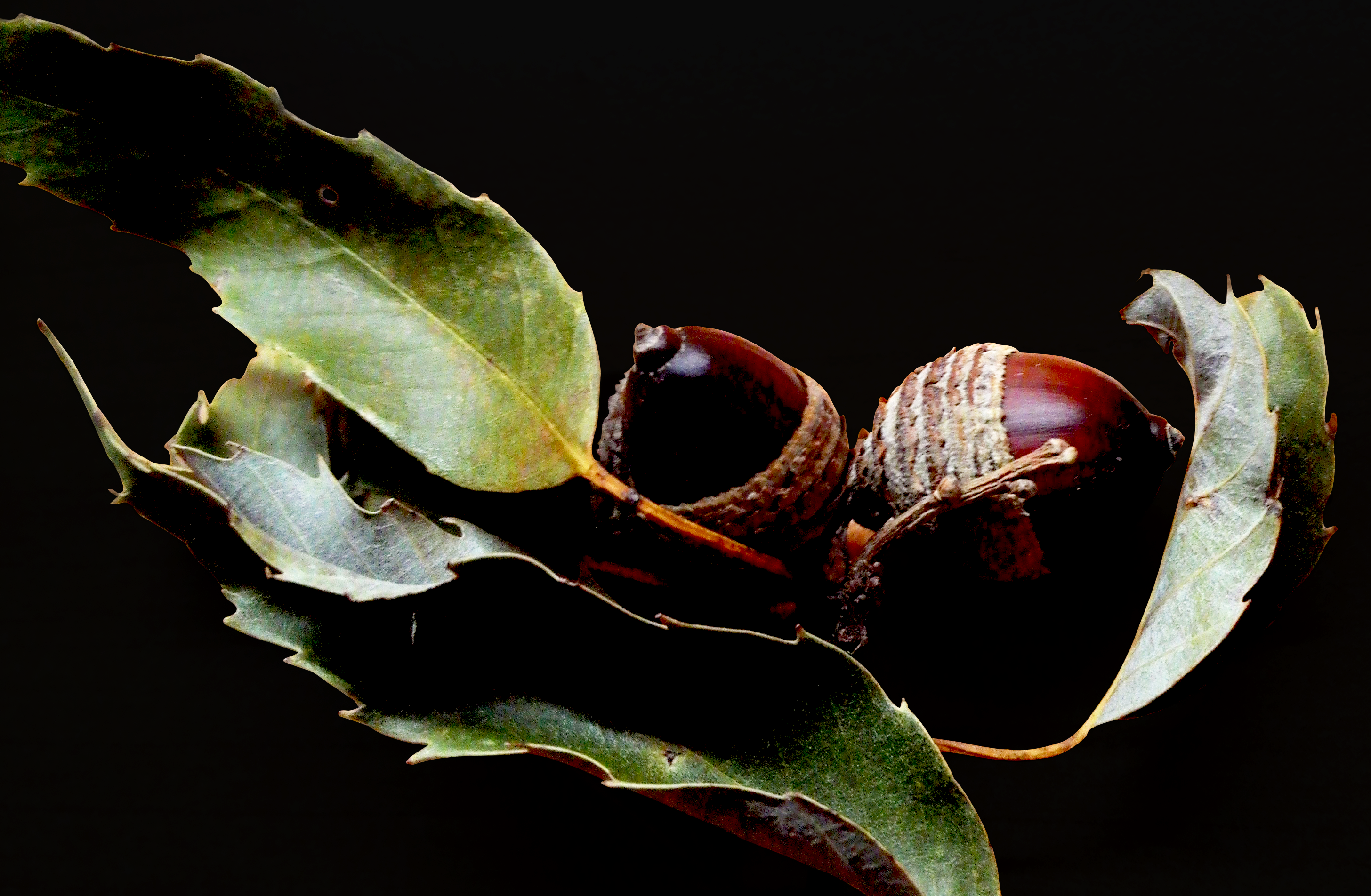
- Acorns and leaves of Arisan oak from Taiwan
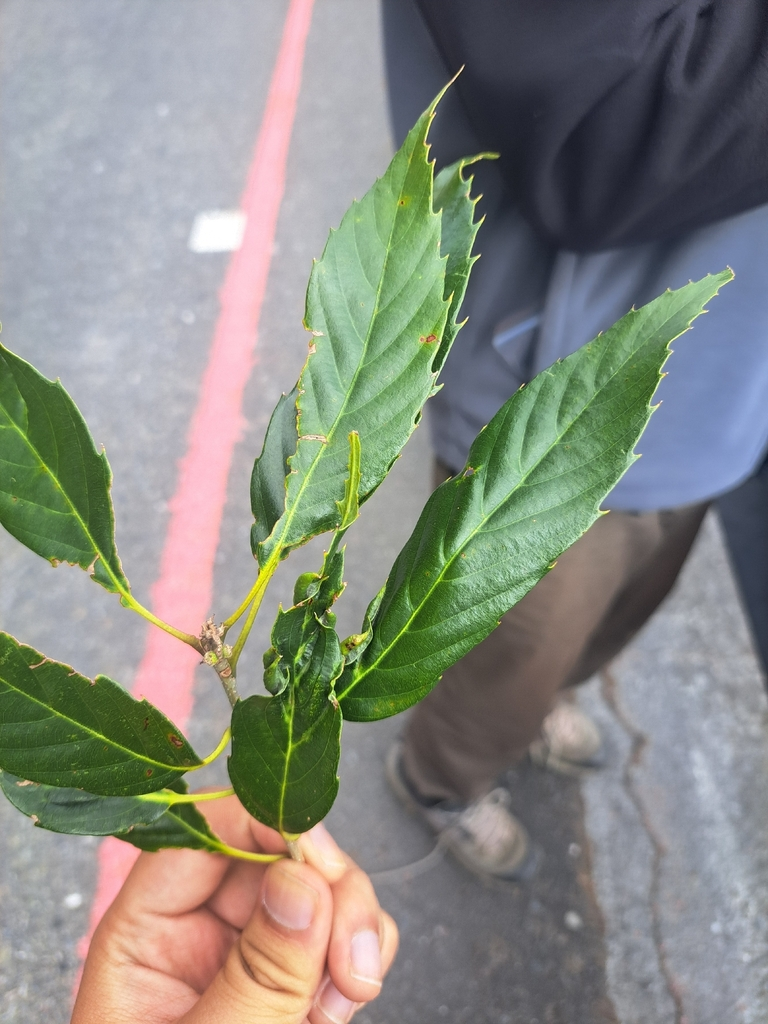
- Leaves of Quercus stenophylloides from Nantou County, Taiwan

Conservation status
- Least Concern (IUCN 3.1)

Scientific classification
- Kingdom: Plantae
- Clade: Tracheophytes
- Clade: Angiosperms
- Clade: Eudicots
- Clade: Rosids
- Order: Fagales
- Family: Fagaceae
- Genus: Quercus
- Subgenus: Quercus subg. Cerris
- Section: Quercus sect. Cyclobalanopsis
- Species: Q. stenophylloides

Binomial name
- Quercus stenophylloides Hayata

Synonyms
- Cyclobalanopsis stenophylloides (Hayata) Kudô & Masam, 1930; Quercus salicina var. stenophylloides (Hayata) S.S. Ying, 1988; Quercus salicina var. asiatica C.F.Shen; Quercus salicina var. stenophylloides (Hayata) S.S.Ying

= Quercus stenophylloides =

Species of plant

Quercus stenophylloides, also called Arisan oak, is a species of evergreen, broad-leaf tree endemic to Taiwan. It is placed in Quercus subgenus Cerris, section Cyclobalanopsis.

== Description ==
Quercus stenophylloides can grow up to 15 m (49 ft) tall, with trunks up to 40 cm (16 in) wide. They have gray branchlets with lenticels.

=== Leaf ===
Leaf shape can range from lanceolate to ovate-oblong, 6–14.5 cm (2.4–5.7 in) long, 1.2–4.2 cm (0.5–1.7 in) wide, acuminate at apex, and acute or obtuse at base.

They are green on the upside, grayish-white, glaucous or green and hairy beneath.

The texture is coriaceous. Echinate-serrate on the edge. Midribs are concave above, elevated beneath. There are 9–17 pairs of lateral veins. Petioles are 1–2.3 cm (0.4–0.9 in) long.

=== Flower ===
Blooming from May to June, the flowers are unisexual and are both small, hairy, growing on the same individual tree.

Both are arranged on a stem, only staminate flowers' are a lot longer. Also, staminate flowers are arranged spirally on a slim drooping stem — this is called catkins.

Staminate catkins are about 5 cm (2 in) long; Staminate flowers are about 3.5 mm (0.14 in) long; 4–6 perianths, lobed, hairy outside, glabrous inside; 4 - 9 stamens, filaments 2.5 mm (0.1 in) long, anthers 1 mm(0.04 in) long.

Pistillate flowers are 2 mm (0.08 in) long, and 3.5 mm (0.14 in) wide; 3–4 perianths, lobed, hairy, 3–4 styles, curved.

=== Fruit ===
Fruits mature from October to November. They are first green, then brown and fall to the ground when mature. The cupules are 0.9–1.2 cm (0.4–0.5 in) long, 1.3–1.5 cm(0.5–0.6 in) across, scales in 8–9 concentric rings, tomentose, margins of rim dentate-serrate; nuts ellipsoid, 1.7–2.1 cm (0.7–0.8 in) long, 1.2–1.6 cm (0.5–0.6 in) across.

== Distribution ==
They are commonly seen in mountains at elevations of 900 – 2600 m throughout the island of Taiwan.
