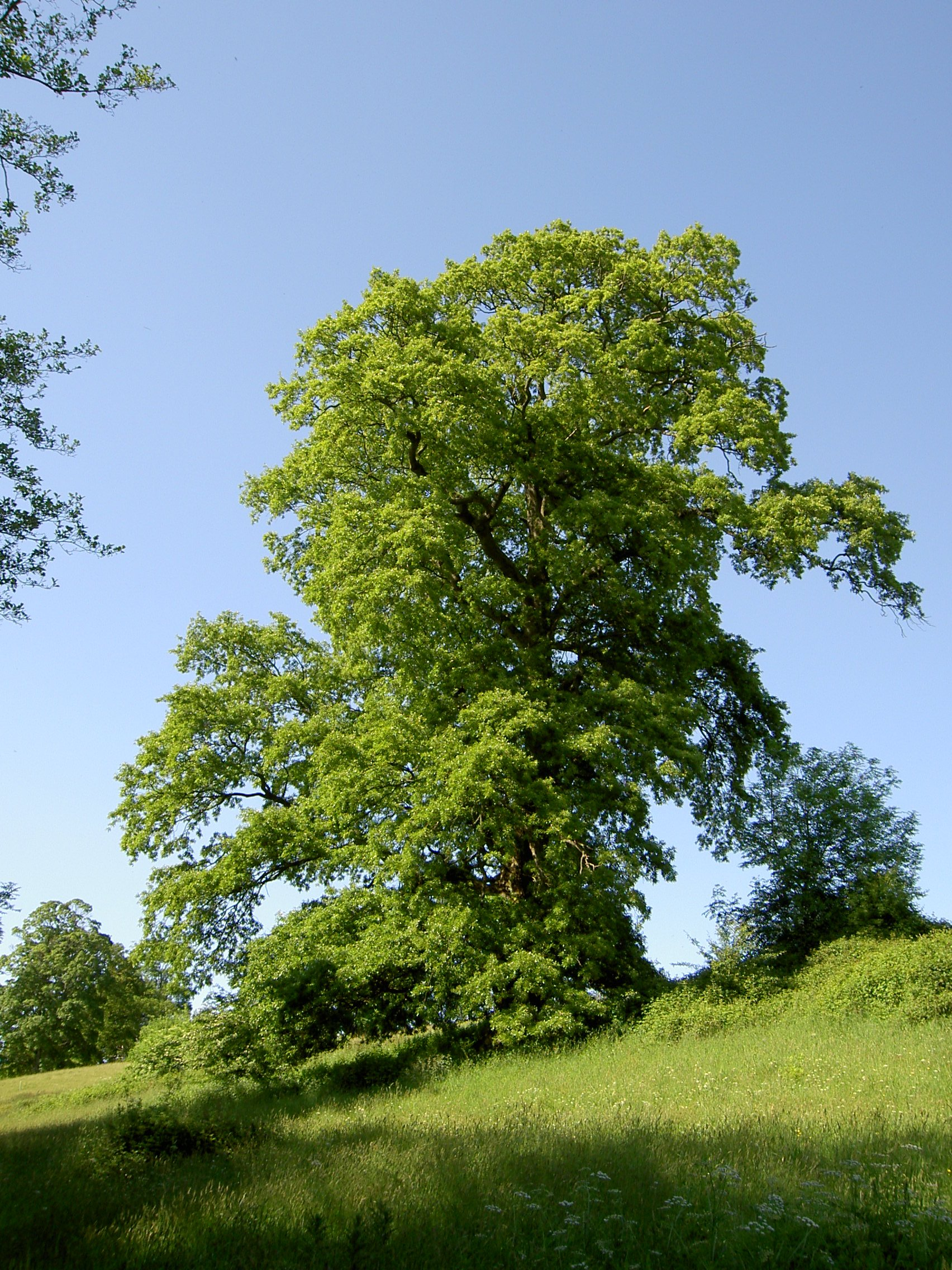
- Quercus cerris (type species)

Scientific classification
- Kingdom: Plantae
- Clade: Tracheophytes
- Clade: Angiosperms
- Clade: Eudicots
- Clade: Rosids
- Order: Fagales
- Family: Fagaceae
- Genus: Quercus
- Subgenus: Quercus subg. Cerris; Oerst.

Sections
- Quercus sect. Cyclobalanopsis Oerst.; Quercus sect. Ilex Loudon; Quercus sect. Cerris Dumort.

= Quercus subg. Cerris =

Subgenus of the genus Quercus

Quercus subgenus Cerris is one of the two subgenera into which the genus Quercus was divided in a 2017 classification (the other being subgenus Quercus). It contains about 140 species divided among three sections. It may be called the Old World clade or the mid-latitude clade; all species are native to Eurasia and North Africa.

== Description ==
Like all species of Quercus, those of subgenus Cerris are trees or shrubs with acorn-like fruit in which a cup covers at least the base of the nut. Members of subgenus Cerris are distinguished from members of subgenus Quercus by few morphological features, their separation being largely determined by molecular phylogenetic evidence. The structure of the mature pollen is one feature that distinguishes the two subgenera: in subgenus Cerris, the small folds or wrinkles (rugulae) are visible or at most weakly obscured, whereas in subgenus Quercus, the rugulae are obscured by sporopollenin.

The two subgenera are also distinguished to some extent by their different distributions. Subgenus Cerris is primarily Eurasian, with a few species in North Africa, and may be called the Old World clade or the mid-latitude clade. Subgenus Quercus occurs mainly in the Americas (although some species are also found in Eurasia and North Africa), and may be called the New World clade or the high-latitude clade.

== Taxonomy ==
Quercus subgenus Cerris was first established by Anders Sandøe Ørsted in 1867. However, his conception and that of later workers, who often reduced it to a section, was closer to the modern section Cerris than the wider circumscription that has resulted from molecular phylogenetic studies, in which the subgenus is one of two divisions of the genus Quercus, and includes three sections.

=== Phylogeny ===
The following cladogram summarizes the relationships that Denk et al. used to draw up their 2017 classification:

- Quercus
  - subg. Quercus
  - - subg. Cerris
      - sect. Cyclobalanopsis
      - - sect. Ilex
        - sect. Cerris

=== Section Cyclobalanopsis ===
Quercus sect. Cyclobalanopsis was first established, as the genus Cyclobalanopsis, by Anders Sandøe Ørsted in 1867. It was first reduced from a genus to a section by George Bentham and William Jackson Hooker in 1880. It has also been treated as a subgenus. Members may be called cycle-cup oaks, or ring-cup oaks.

Like all species of Quercus, those of section Cyclobalanopsis are trees or shrubs with acorn-like fruit. The staminate flowers are arranged in groups of usually one to three, but sometimes up to seven, along the axis of the inflorescence. The ornamentation of the mature pollen is a distinguishing feature of the section: pollen grains have vertical folds (rugulae). The stalk that joins the perianth to the ovary (the perianthopodium) has three to five distinct rings. The 'cup' (cupule) around the base of acorn also has distinct rings formed from thin membranes (lamellae), which also distinguishes the section from other oaks. The leaves are evergreen.

The section contains about 90 species native to tropical and subtropical Asia including the southern Himalayas.

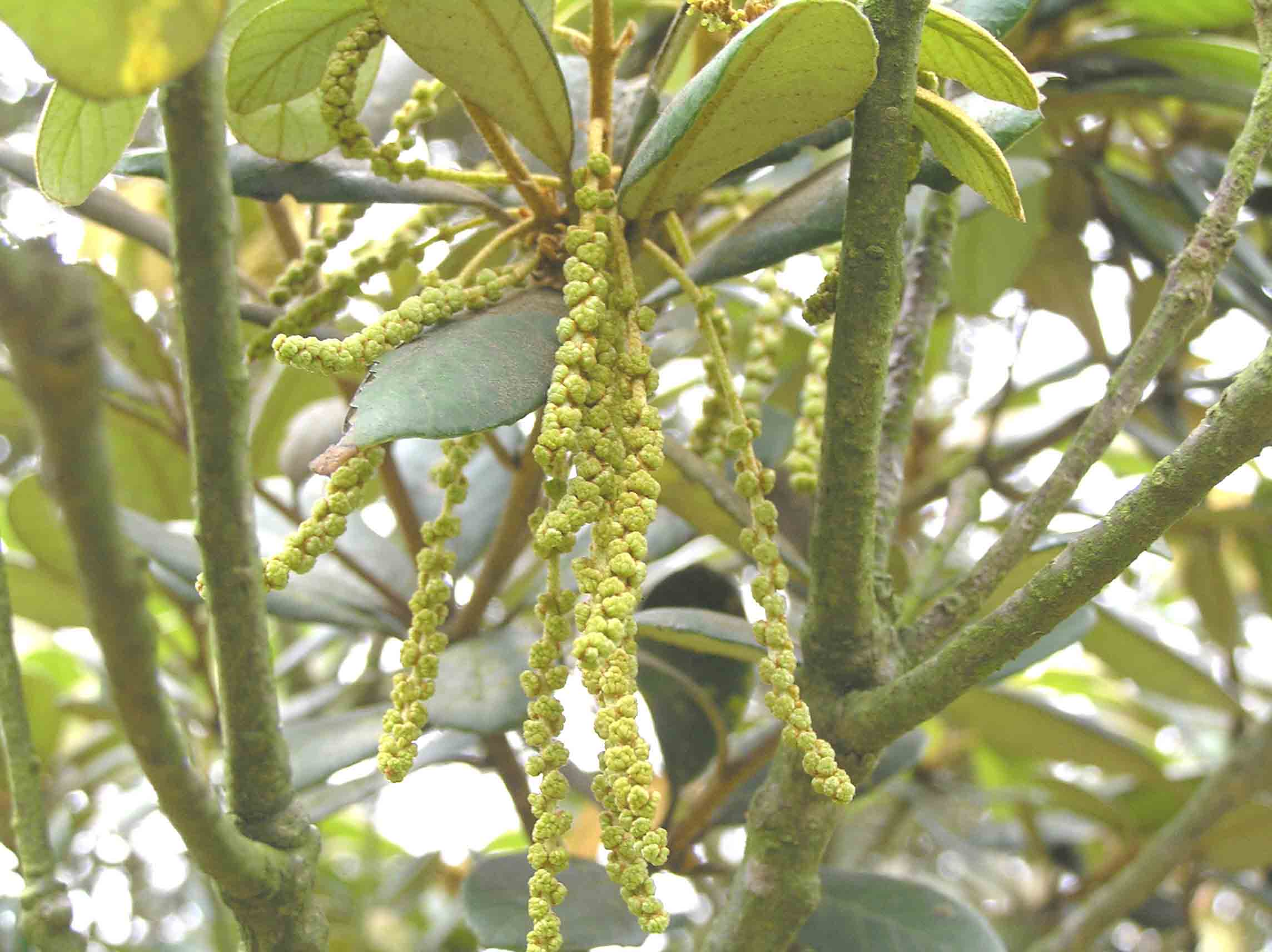
Catkins of Quercus championii in Hong Kong

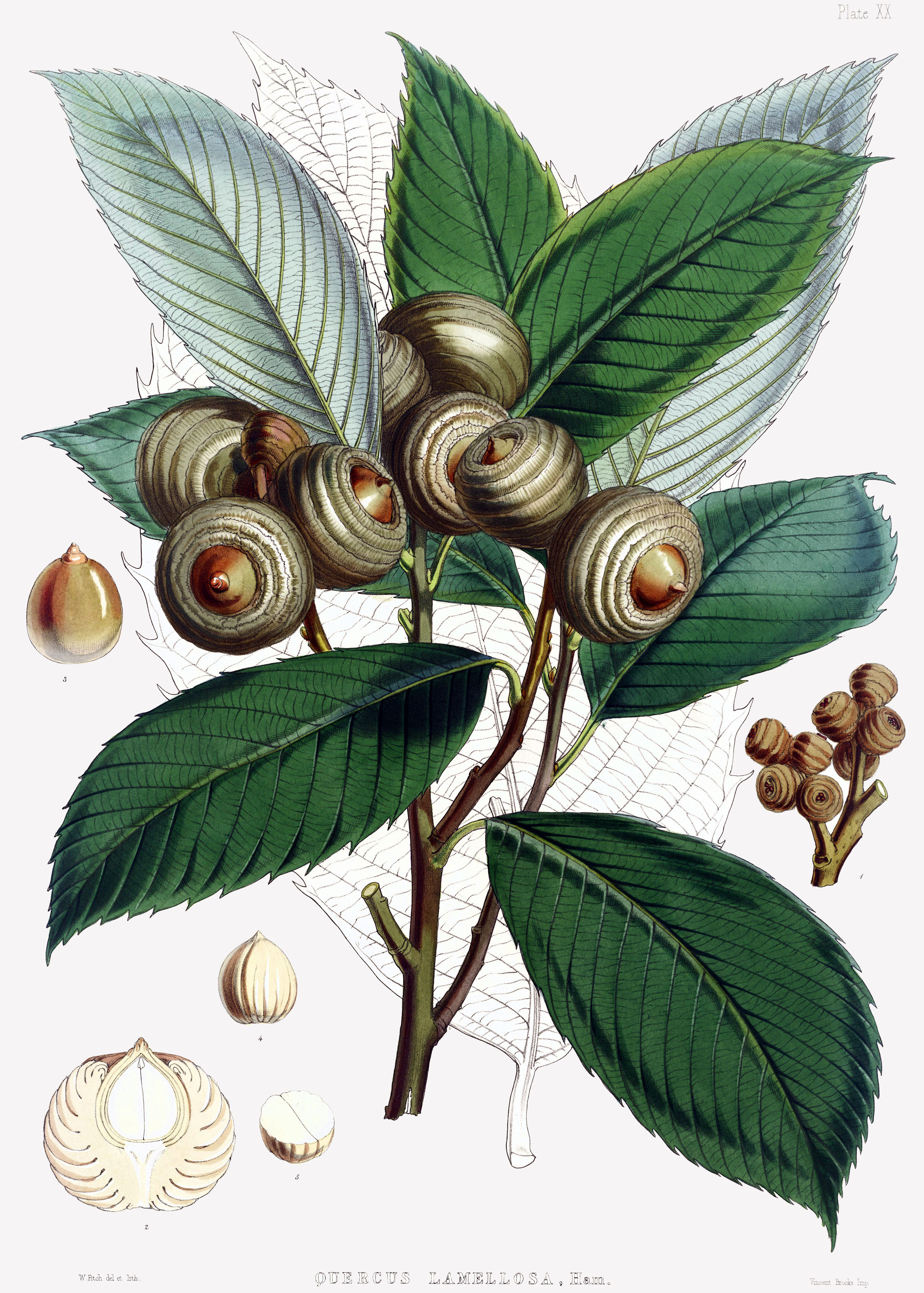
Illustration of Quercus lamellosa with acorns

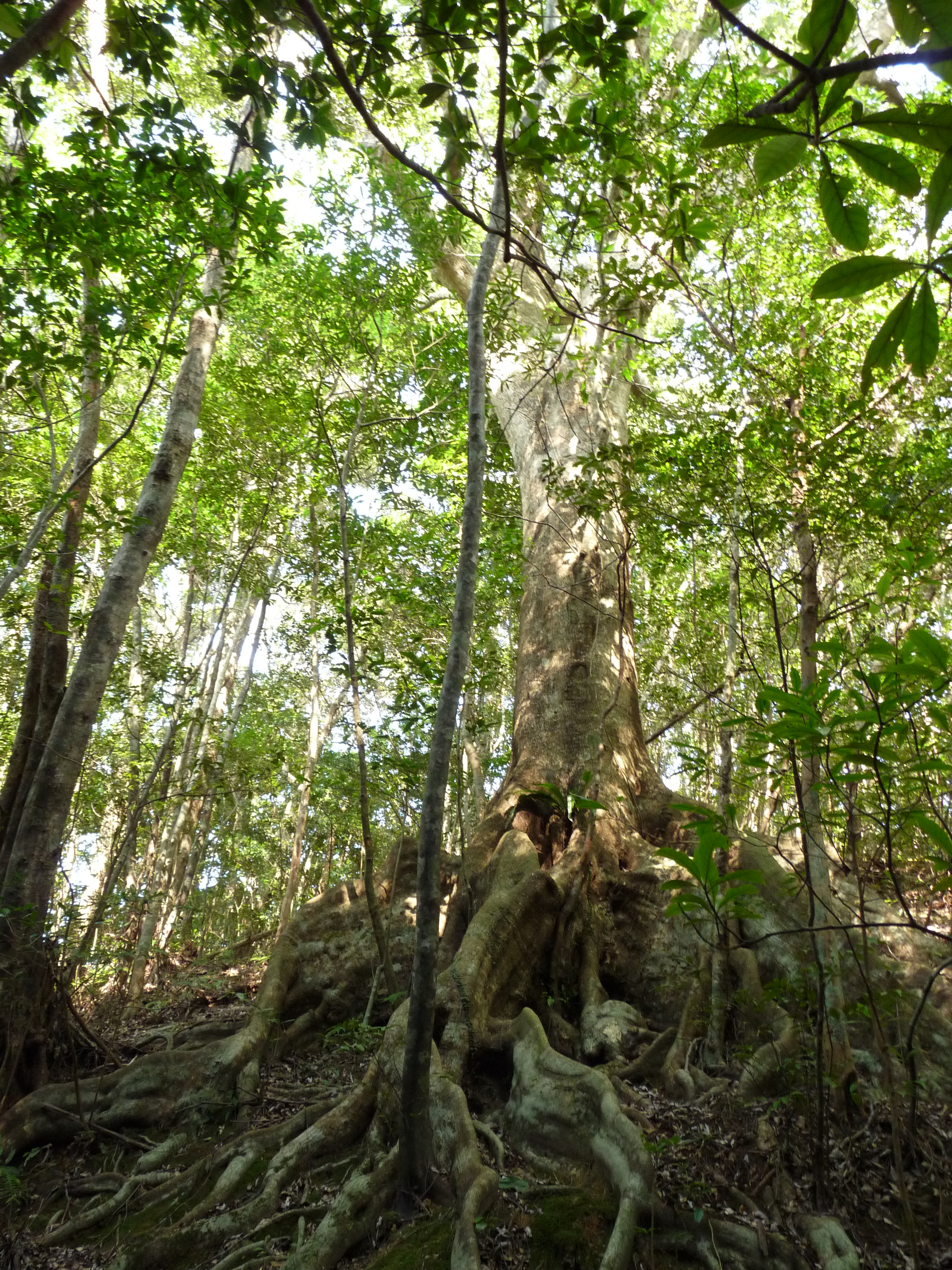
Quercus miyagii in habitat

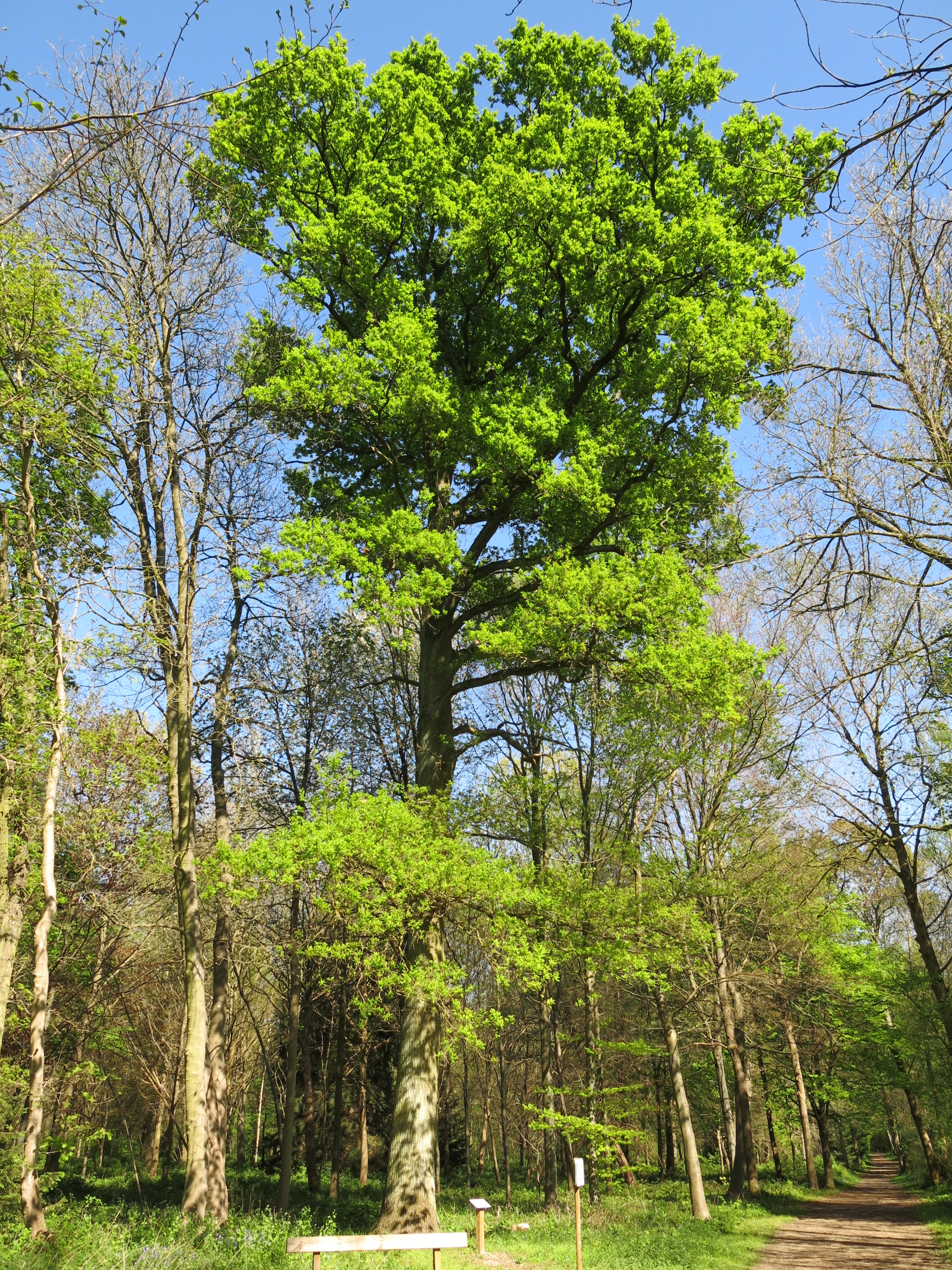
Quercus sessilifolia in cultivation in France

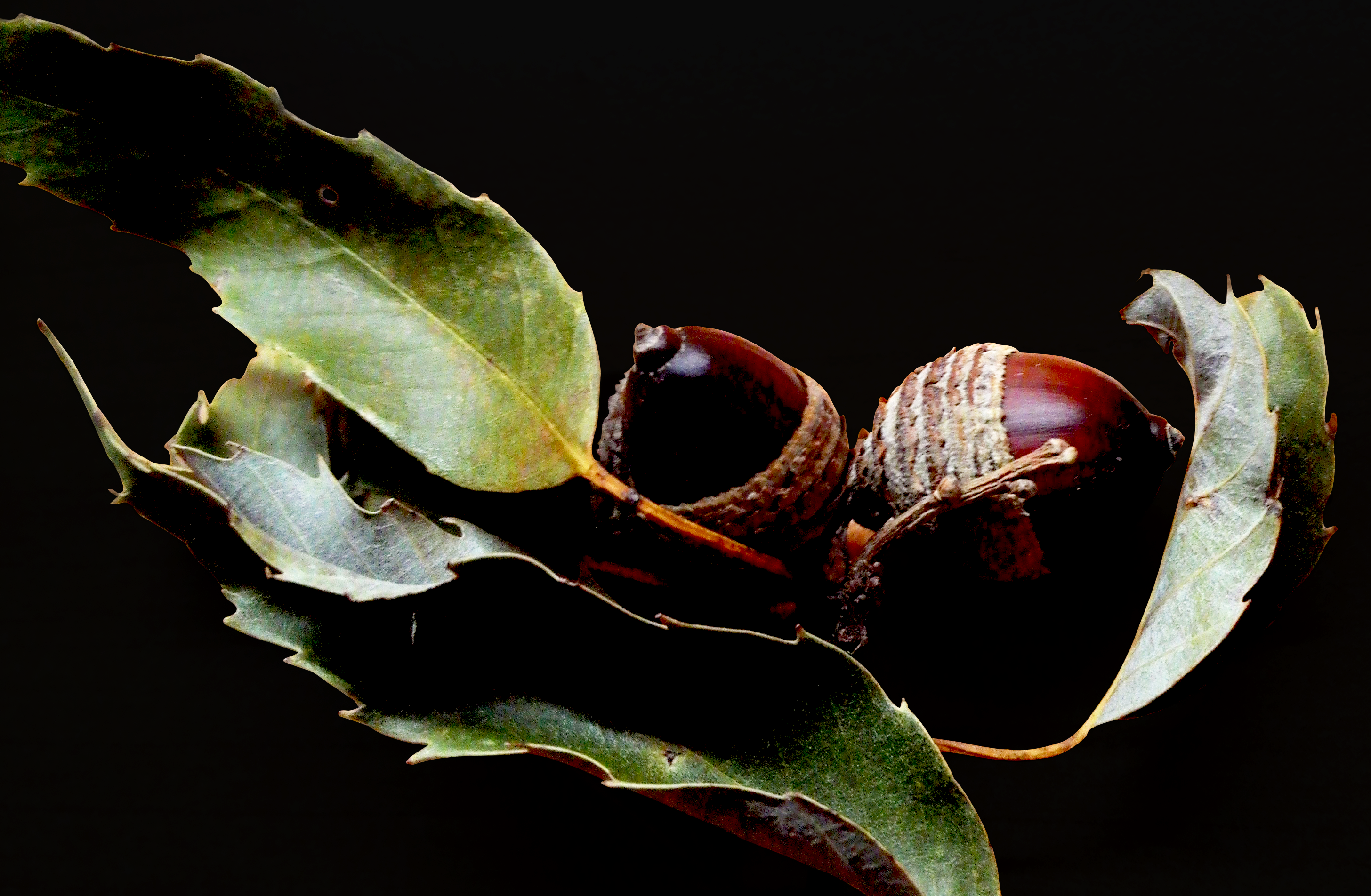
Leaves and acorns of Quercus stenophylloides

=== Section Ilex ===
Quercus sect. Ilex was first established by John Claudius Loudon in 1838. It has also been treated as a subgenus, under the name Quercus subg. Heterobalanus Oerst., and as subsection. Members may be called ilex oaks.

Like all species of Quercus, those of section Ilex are trees or shrubs with acorn-like fruit. The staminate flowers have four to six stamens. The ornamentation of the mature pollen is distinctive, consisting of wrinkles or folds (rugulae). The acorns mature either annually or after two years. The cup of the acorn has triangular scales, usually thin and membranous. The toothed leaves are evergreen with spines or bristles at the ends of the teeth.

The section contains about 40 species native to Eurasia and North Africa.

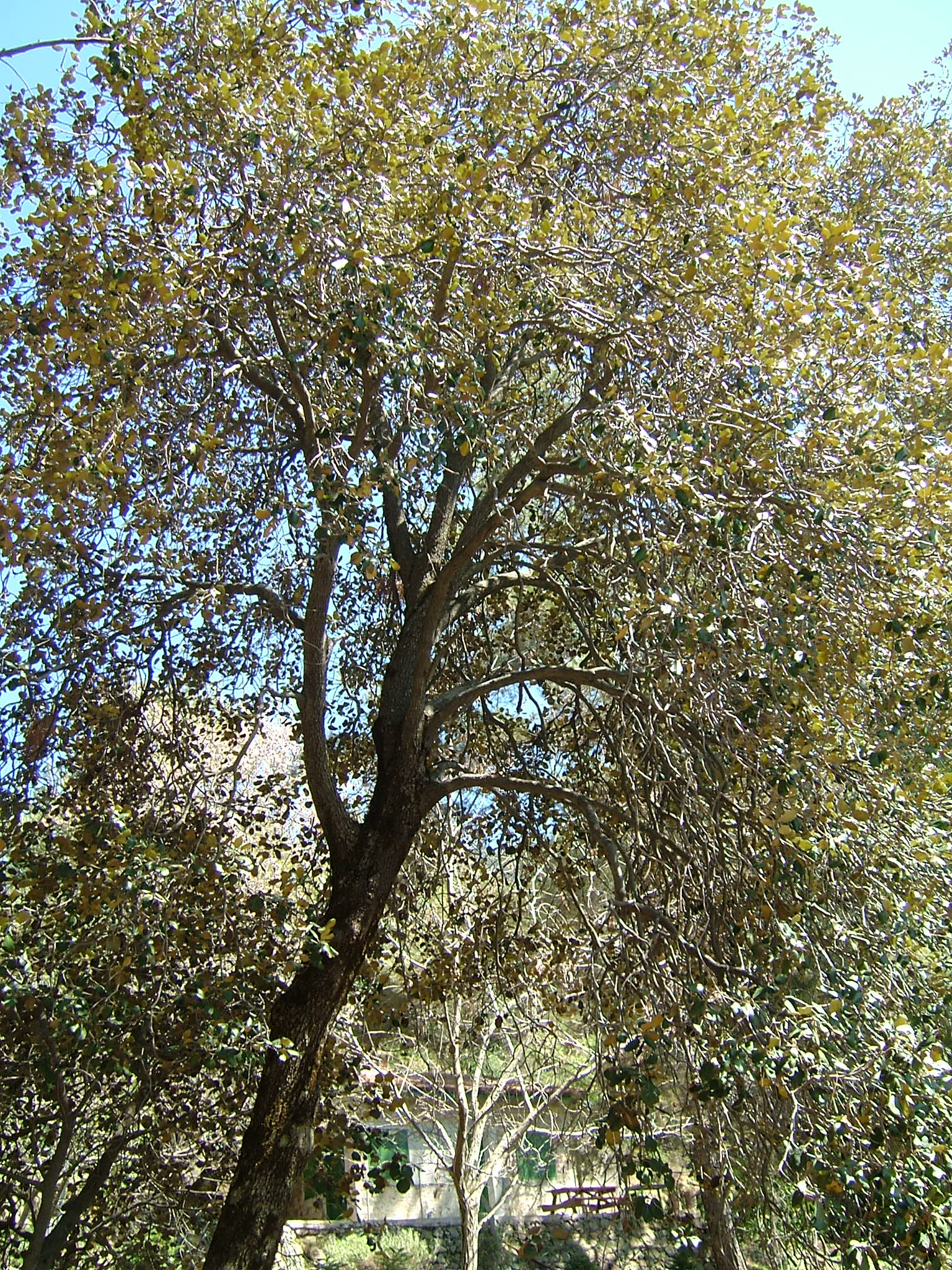
Quercus alnifolia

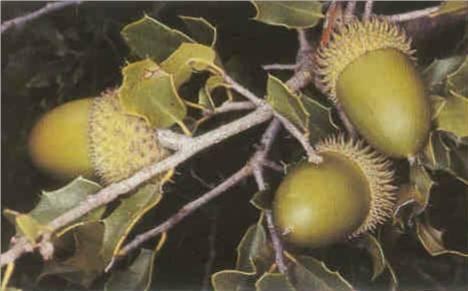
Acorns of Quercus coccifera

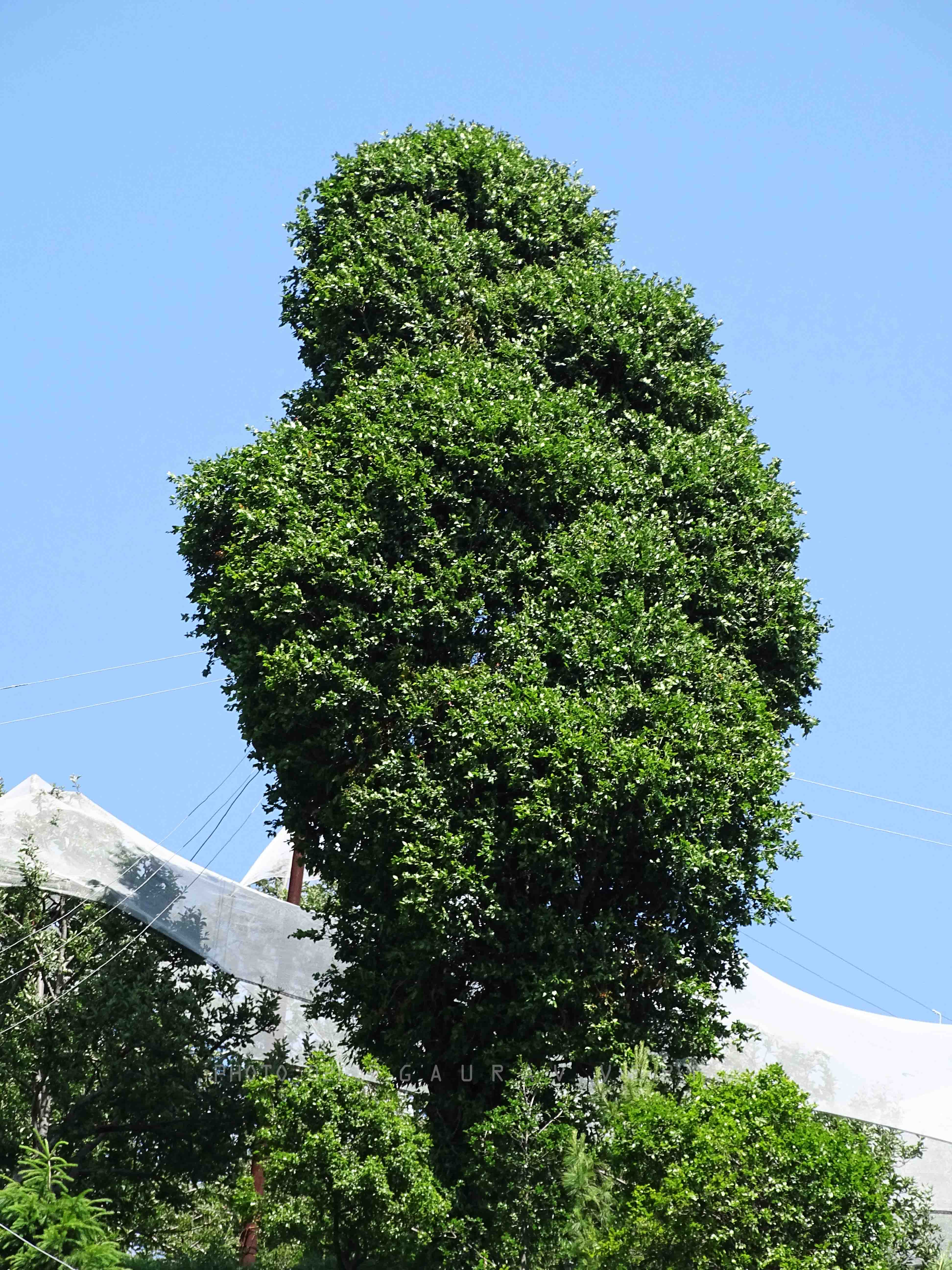
Quercus floribunda

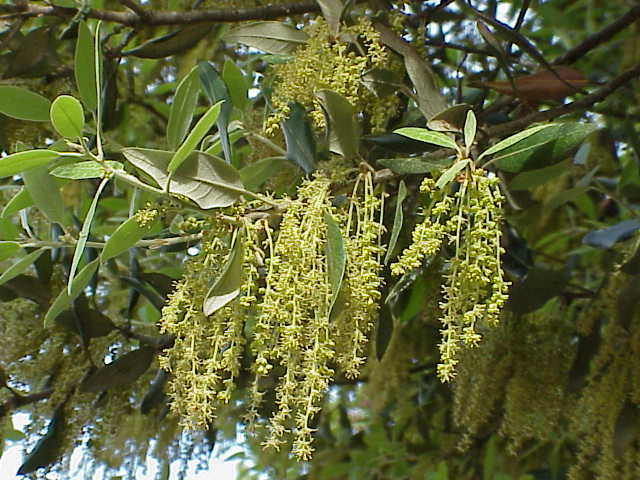
Leaves and catkins of Quercus ilex

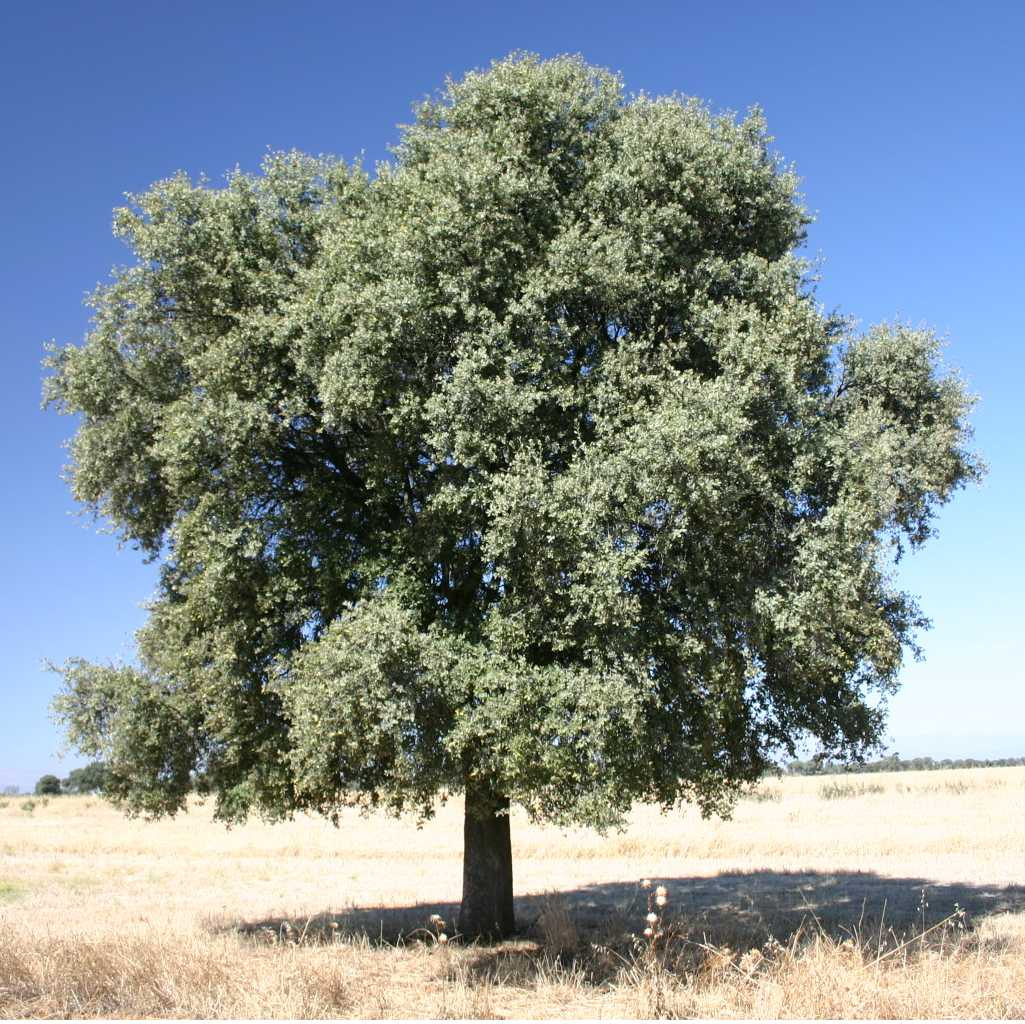
Quercus rotundifolia

=== Section Cerris ===
Quercus section Cerris was first established by Barthélemy Charles Joseph Dumortier in 1829. It has been treated as a section under other names, including Quercus sect. Erythrobalanopsis Oerst., Quercus sect. Castaneifolia O.Schwarz, Quercus sect. Vallonea O.Schwarz, Quercus sect. Aegilops (Reichenb.) O.Schwarz and the illegitimate name Quercus sect. Eucerris Oerst. Members may be called cerris oaks or cork oaks.

Like all species of Quercus, those of section Cerris are trees or shrubs with acorn-like fruit. The staminate flowers have four to six stamens. The ornamentation of the mature pollen is distinctive, consisting of scattered small bumps (verrucate). The cup of the acorn has narrowly triangular scales, thickened and with a keel and elongated recurved tips. The leaf is toothed, typically with bristle-like extensions to the teeth.

There are about 15 species in Eurasia and North Africa, and it is the only oak section with a centre of diversity in the Western Palearctic. A genetic study by Denk and colleagues (2023) analysed their evolution and genetic history, establishing that the section probably has its origins in the early Oligocene of northeastern Asia. From there, it migrated to western Eurasia most likely following a northern route through central Asia, and had arrived in central Germany by the early Miocene at the latest. The current diversity in section Cerris can be grouped into 5 subsections, four of which are native to western Eurasia. Among the species in the section, Quercus suber holds particular economic importance as the main source of cork.

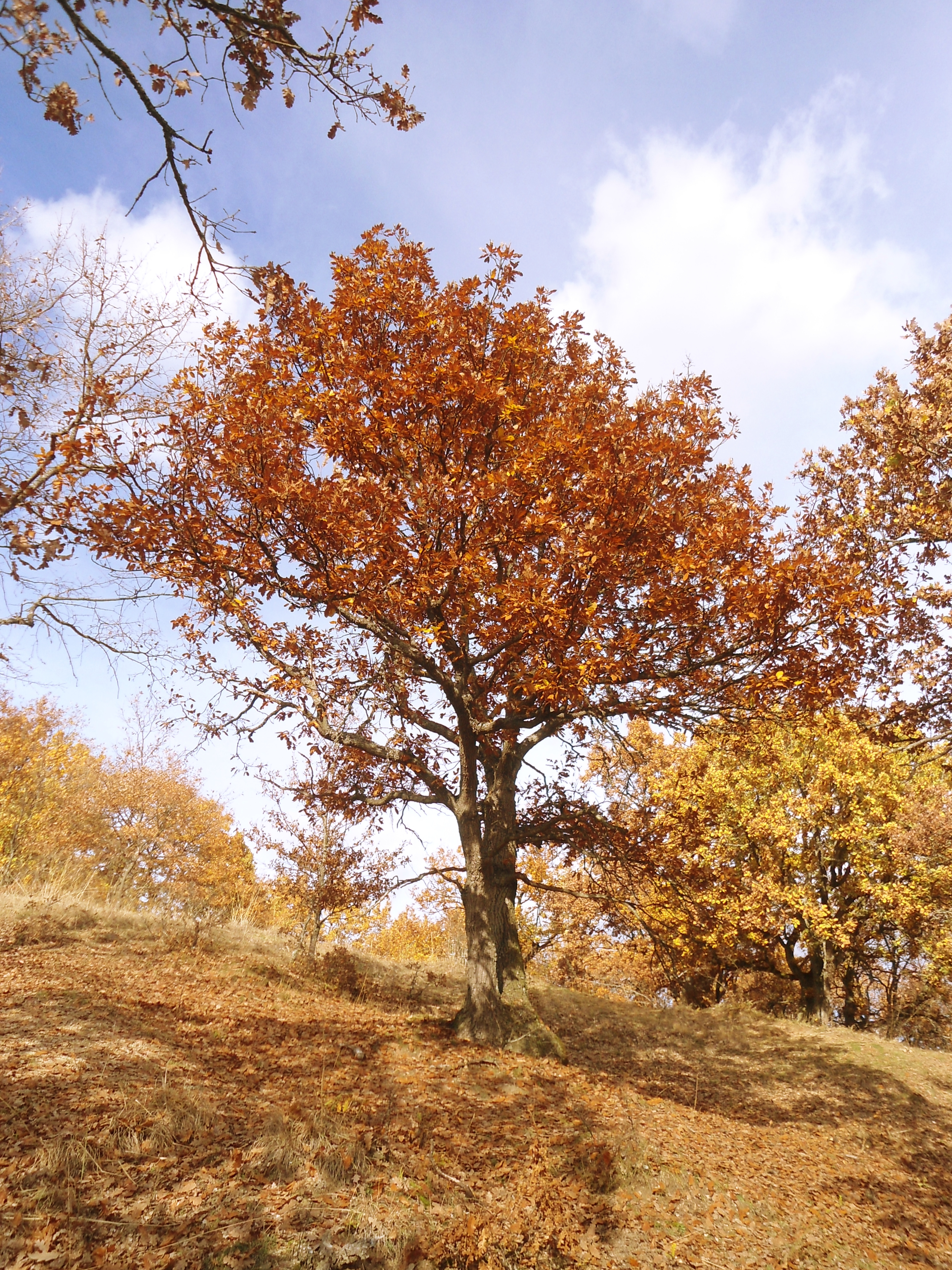
Quercus cerris in autumn

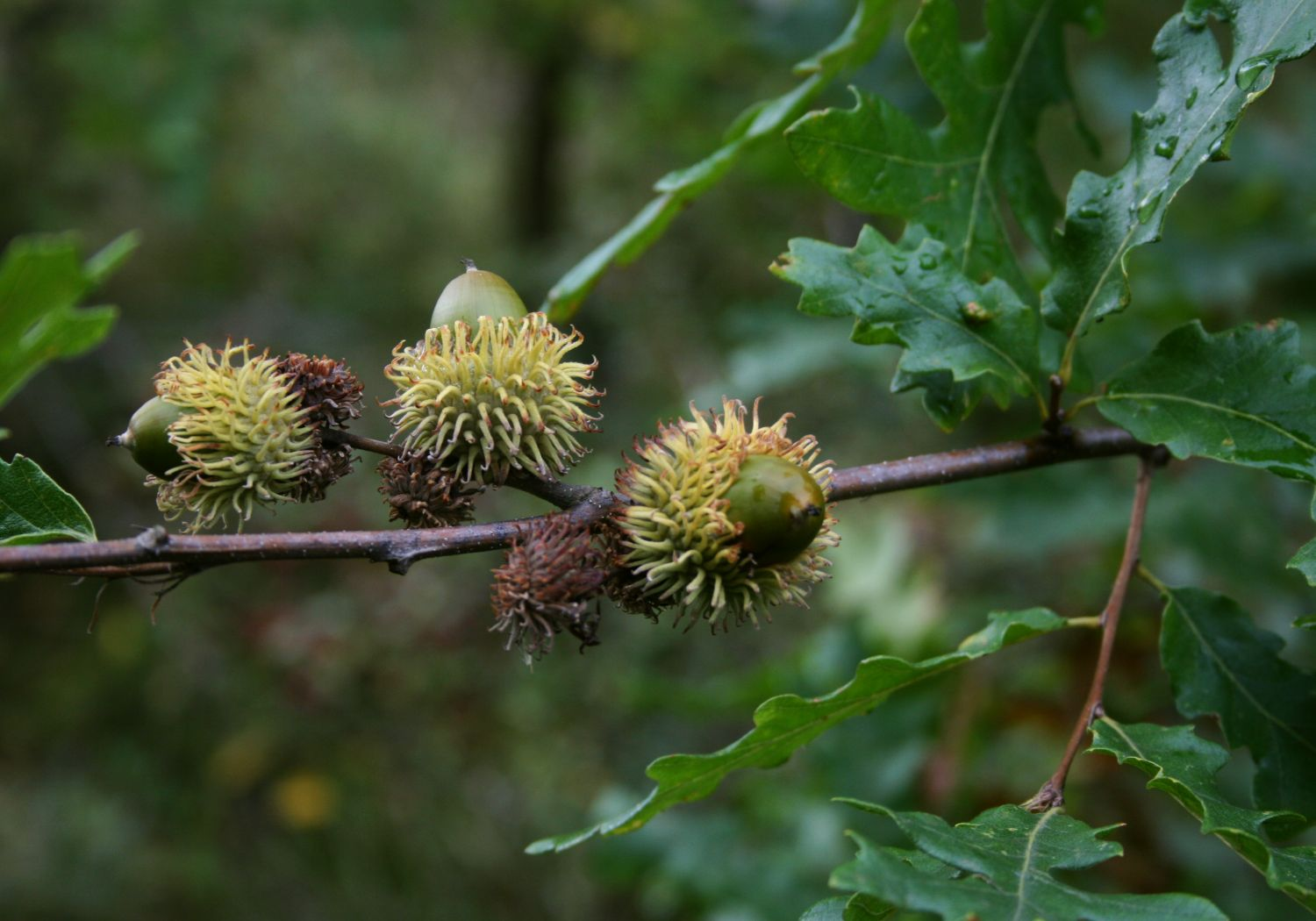
Acorns of Quercus cerris

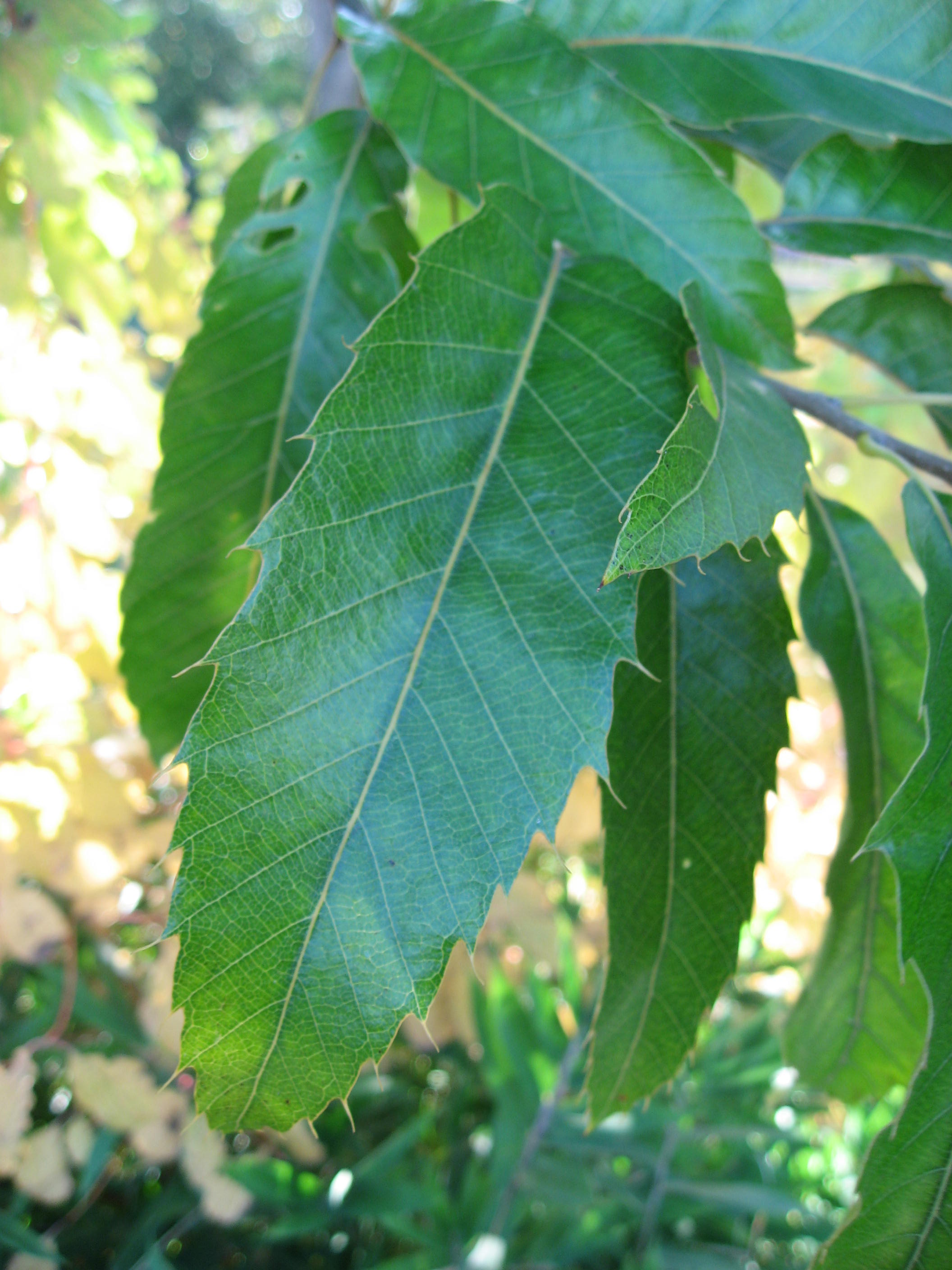
Leaves of Quercus acutissima

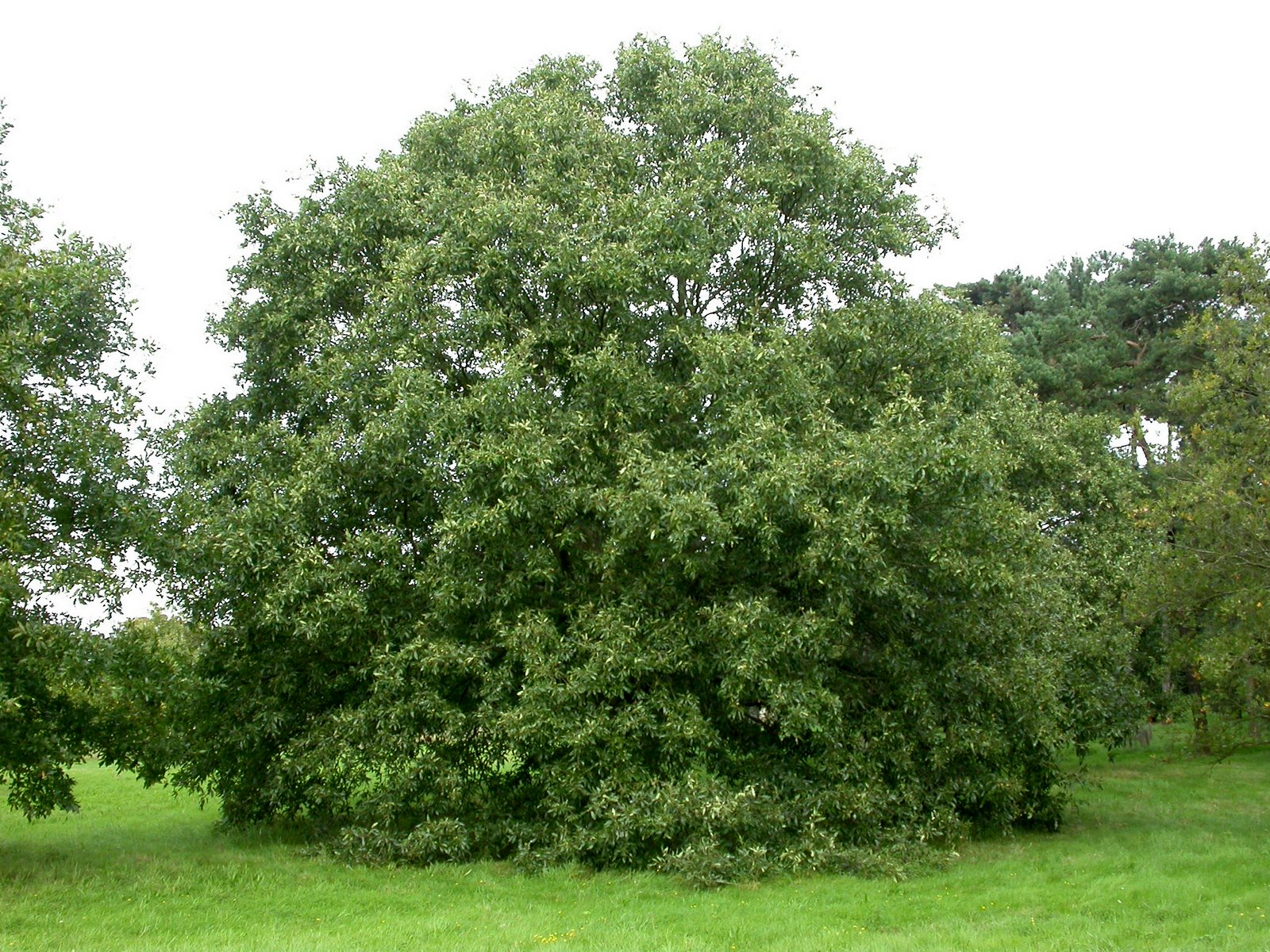
Quercus libani

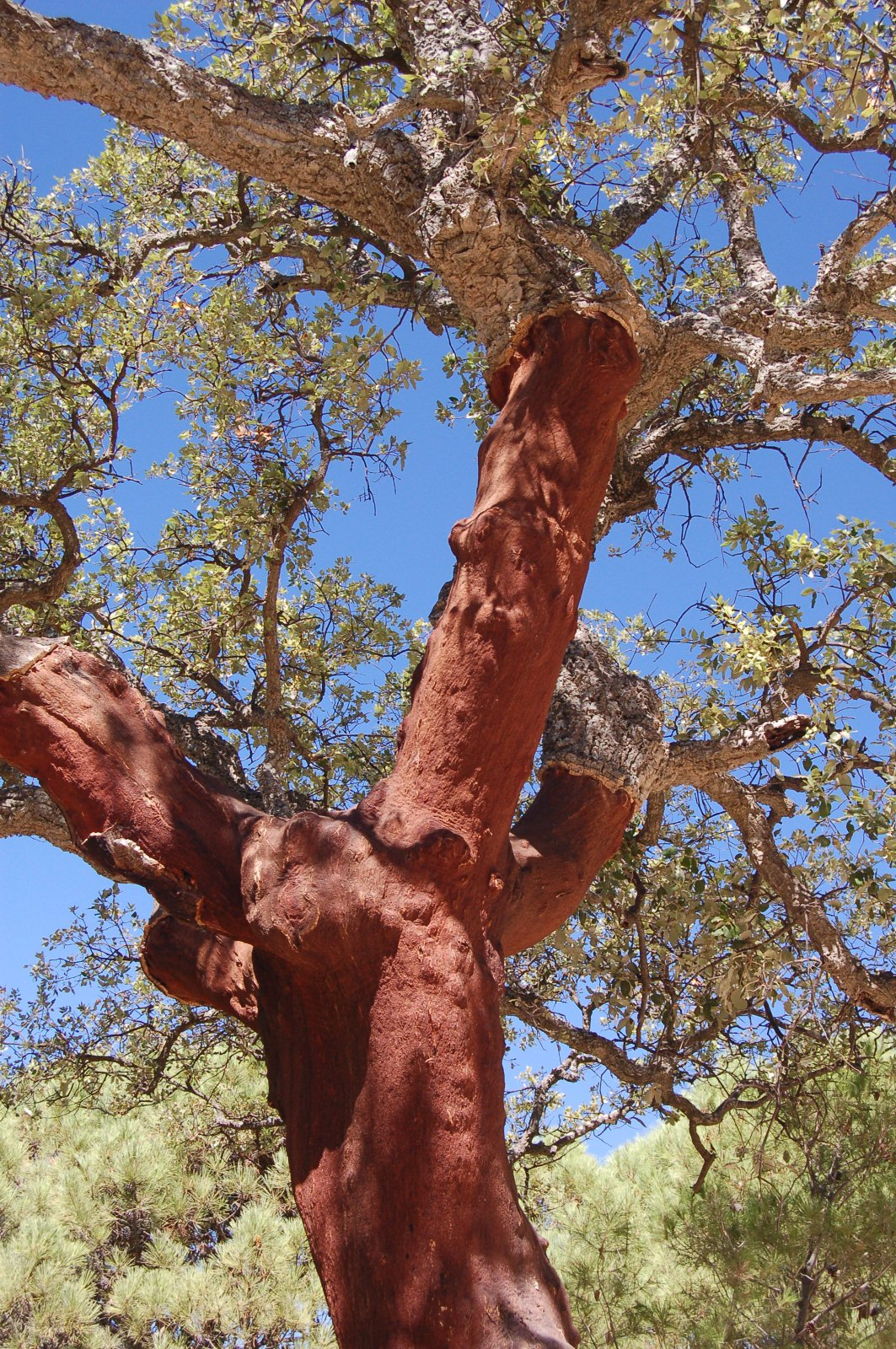
Trunk of Quercus suber, the cork oak, after harvesting

== Conservation ==
The 2020 Red List of Oaks shows that within the species assessed across all eight sections of the genus Quercus, the sections Cyclobalanopsis and Ilex have the largest proportions of species put into the "critically endangered" category, representing the highest level of threat. A large number of section Cyclobalanopsis species occur in China: the Flora of China states that 69 are native to China of which 43 are endemic. China has the largest number of threatened oak species.
