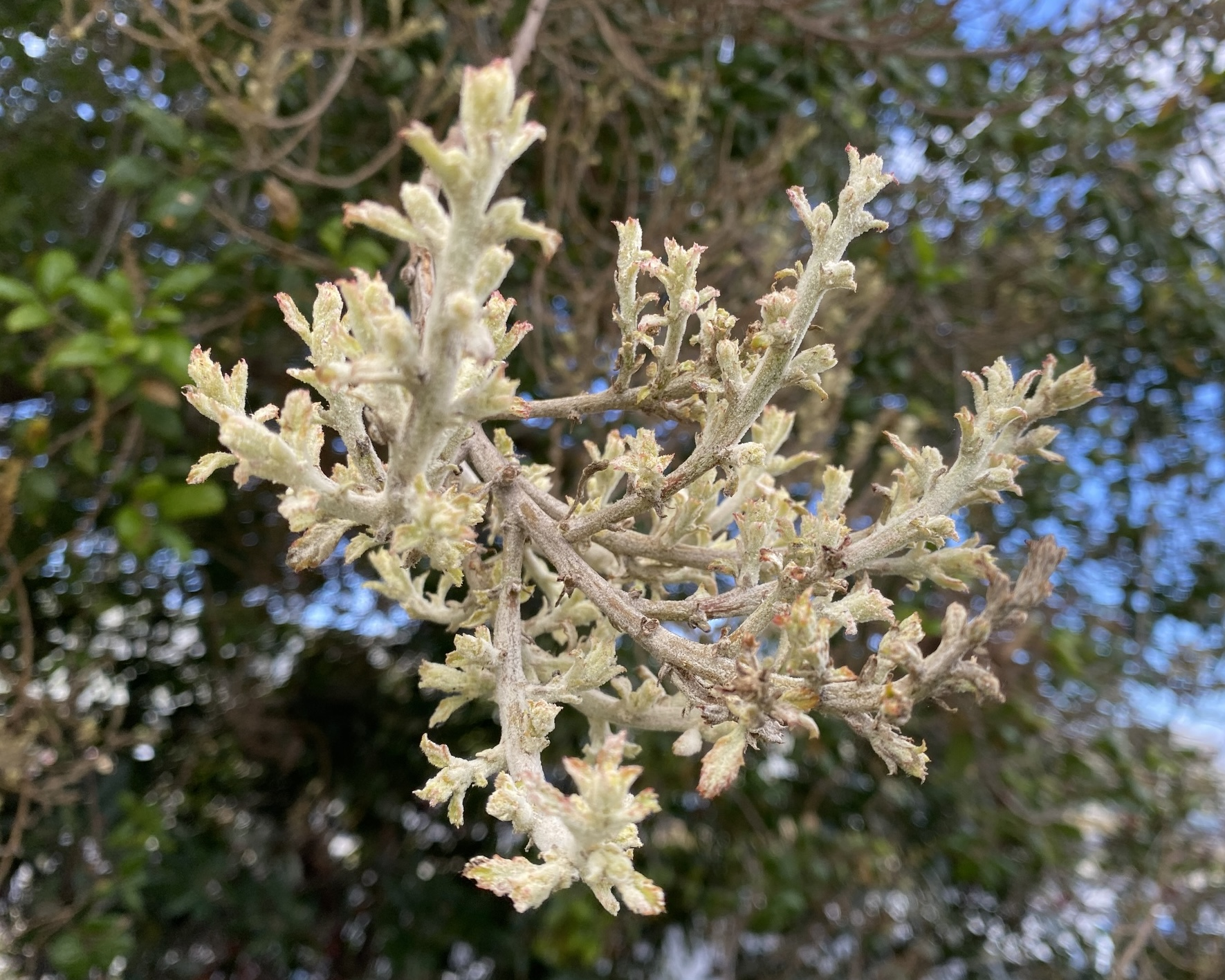
- Cystotheca lanestris witch's broom symptom on Quercus agrifolia in California.

Scientific classification
- Kingdom: Fungi
- Division: Ascomycota
- Class: Leotiomycetes
- Order: Helotiales
- Family: Erysiphaceae
- Genus: Cystotheca
- Species: C. lanestris

Binomial name
- Cystotheca lanestris (Harkn.) Miyabe, 1909

Synonyms
- Sphaerotheca lanestris Harkn., 1884; Albigo lanestris (Harkn.) Kuntze, 1898; Cystotheca lanestris (Harkn.) Sacc., 1911; Oidium ventricosum Harkn., 1884

= Cystotheca lanestris =

North American gall-inducing fungus

Cystotheca lanestris (commonly known as the live oak witch's broom fungus) is a species of powdery mildew in the family Erysiphaceae. It is found in North America on plants in the genus Quercus. Its primary range is south-western United States and north-western Mexico, mostly along the coast where its preferred host plants are found.

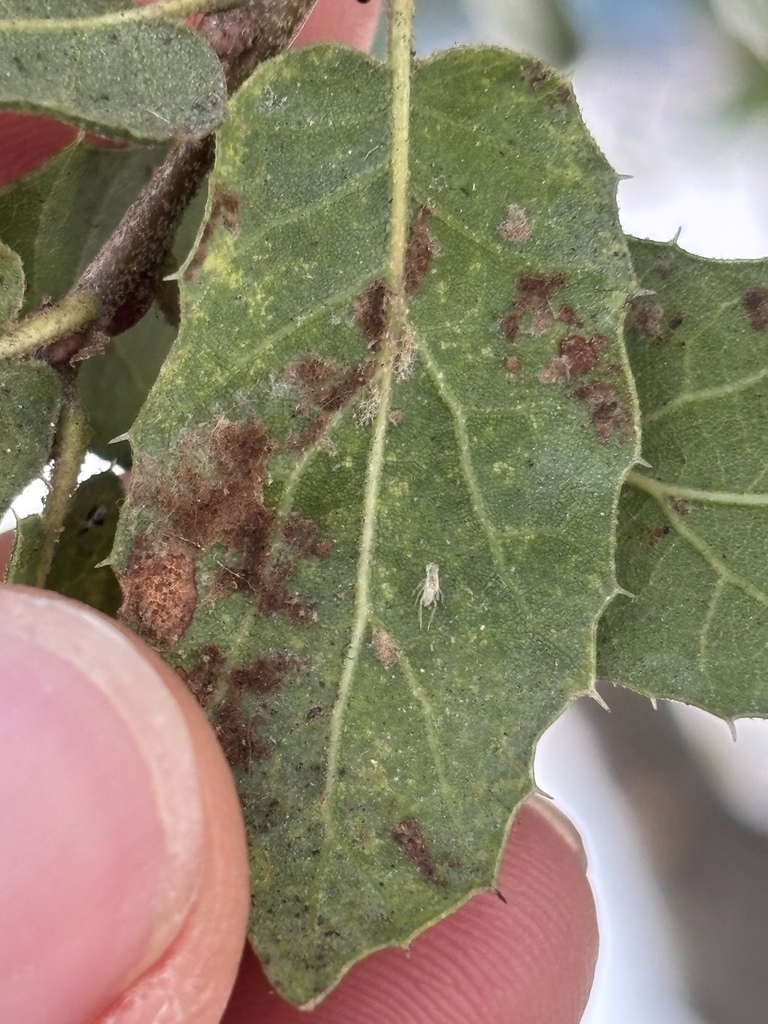
Cystotheca lanestris mycelium on the underside of a Quercus leaf in California.

== Description ==
Cystotheca lanestris forms white mycelium turning grey to tan brown with age. It induces witch's-broom galls – abnormal clusters of shoots that are thickened, elongated and highly branched with very small leaves. Cystotheca lanestris, like most Erysiphaceae, is fairly host-specific and only infects species in the genus Quercus. Within this genus however, it is found on a rather large selection of oak species, including Quercus agrifolia, alba, bicolor, canbyi, cerris, chrysolepis, coccinea, crassipes, douglasii, engelmannii, garryana, ilex, kelloggii, laceyi, laeta, laurifolia, lobata, macrocarpa, michauxii, nigra, obtusata, palmeri, palustris, phellos, polymorpha, potosina, robur, rubra, stellata, suber, toumeyi, velutina, virginiana, and wislizeni. Asian collections previously assigned to this species belong to a phylogenetically different species, C. kusanoi. Another species infecting Quercus in North America, Cystotheca mexicana, is endemic to Mexico and is found on similarly endemic oaks.

== Taxonomy ==
The fungus was formally described in 1884 by Harkness with the basionym Sphaerotheca lanestris. The species was transferred to the genus Cystotheca in 1909 by Miyabe.
