= Powdery mildew (oaks) =

Identification assistance for powdery mildews

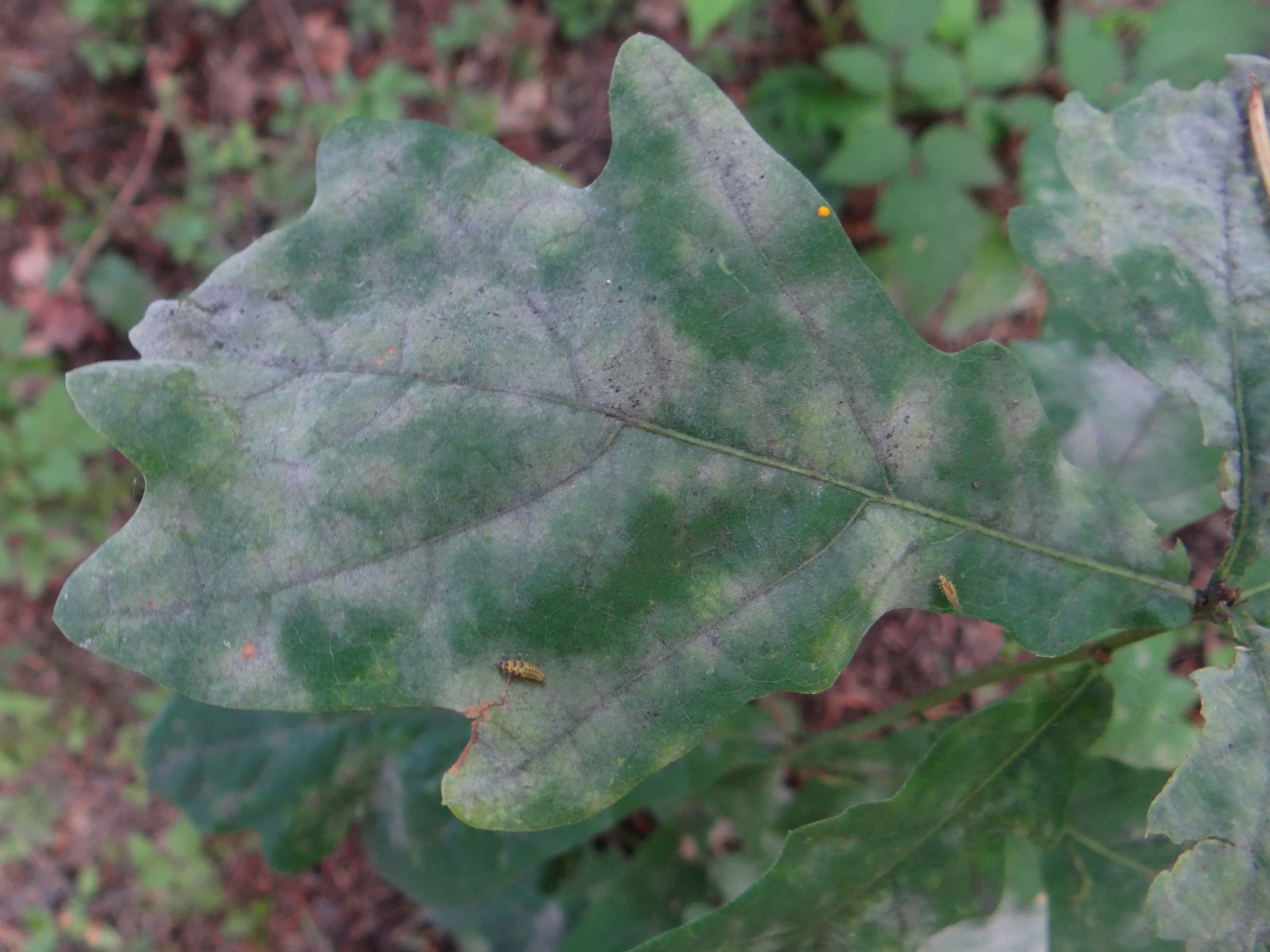
An Erysiphe species infecting Quercus in Europe.

Oaks (plants in the genus Quercus) have likely been hosts of powdery mildews since the pathogens first evolved in the Late Cretaceous. As a result, there is a very high diversity of powdery mildews on these hosts, with human trade in the host plant ensuring powdery mildew on oak can be found on every continent bar Antarctica.

== American oaks ==
Powdery mildews on oaks native to North America are very diverse and were poorly distinguished until recently. Additional undescribed species likely exist, and more study is needed to understand even the known species’ macroscopic distinctions. Furthermore, the presence of introduced oaks and introduced powdery mildew (such as Erysiphe alphitoides on Quercus robur) further complicates the situation, especially as some of the species on introduced oaks occasionally infect native hosts. The following list is mostly split by section:

Quercus sect. Lobatae

- Thin, spidery or in uniform flat circular patches, colourless or slightly greyish, on upper surfaces of host leaves, mostly on oaks from north-western Mexico and south-western US in multiple sections (e.g. Quercus agrifolia, Q. chrysolepis, Q. hypoleucoides, Q. toumeyi, etc.): Erysiphe trinae
- Often white and forming dense, highly irregular patches, confirmed on Quercus kelloggii: Erysiphe occidentalis. This species’ host range is not well known but seems to be very broad but it could be split up further in future.
- In white to grey sharply discrete dense patches with matte texture and sharp edges (like paper) on subsection Phellos and possibly also Quercus velutina: Erysiphe calocladophora. The full host range is not well known.
- In white patches with softer texture and edges (like felt), sometimes tracing major veins; on Quercus marilandica and subsection Coccineae: Erysiphe densissima
- Thin, diffuse to blotchy, often avoiding major veins, covering entire leaf uppersides, generally not uniformly dense but patches not sharp-edged, on subsection Coccineae: Erysiphe extensa
- Loosely to effusely tracing veins, widespread on subsection Phellos;: Erysiphe schweinitziana
- Dense patches tracing veins, only known on Q. nigra in south-eastern United States: Erysiphe quercophila
- Loose patches, on leaf upper sides, only found on Q. laurifolia: Erysiphe quercus-laurifoliae
- Only known on Q. phellos: Erysiphe phellos
- White to greyish, on upper sides of leaves, forming blotchy spots or patches to thin spread on a few hosts including Q. laevis, Q. nigra, Q. pagoda: Erysiphe carolinensis
- On subsection Palustres, mainly Q. palustris: unknown Erysiphe
- Greyish white, in thin patches across leaf undersides: Phyllactinia angulata (sensu lato)
- Pure white, fluffy or somewhat tufted, in patches on leaf undersides, on Mexican red oaks (Erythromexicana clade): Phyllactinia leveilluloides
- Thick and rough, first white then turning brown, often stunting or distorting new shoots, in western North America: Cystotheca lanestris

Quercus sect. Protobalanus

- Thin, spidery or in uniform flat circular patches, colourless or slightly greyish, on upper surfaces of host leaves, mostly on oaks from north-western Mexico and south-western US in multiple sections (e.g. Quercus agrifolia, Q. chrysolepis, Q. hypoleucoides, Q. toumeyi, etc.): Erysiphe trinae

Quercus sect. Quercus

- Thin, spidery or in uniform flat circular patches, colourless or slightly greyish, on upper surfaces of host leaves, mostly on oaks from north-western Mexico and south-western US in multiple sections (e.g. Quercus agrifolia, Q. chrysolepis, Q. hypoleucoides, Q. toumeyi, etc.): Erysiphe trinae
- Faint or transient, spreading, and not causing lesions, on subsection Prinoideae: Erysiphe abbreviata
- Faint or transient, spreading, and not causing lesions, on Mexican white oaks (Leucomexicana clade): Erysiphe couchii
- Spreading or forming loose patches; only confirmed on Quercus gambelii: Erysiphe gambelii
- Often white and forming dense, highly irregular patches, on many oaks but confirmed solely on Quercus garryana: Erysiphe occidentalis. This species’ host range is not well known but seems to be very broad but it could be split up further in future.
- On bur oak (Quercus macrocarpa), growth very variable: Erysiphe parmeleeana
- On white oaks such as eastern white or swamp white oak (Quercus alba, Quercus bicolor), in soft white irregular patches, often tracing major leaf veins in 'stripes': Erysiphe pseudoextensa
- Diffuse or forming irregular patches, not causing lesions, on Mexican white oaks (Leucomexicana clade): unknown Erysiphe
- Dense, white, causing yellowish to brownish lesions and significant distortions on leaves, on chestnut-leaved members of subsection Prinoideae: unknown Erysiphe
- Greyish white, in thin patches across leaf undersides: unknown Phyllactinia (formerly attributed to P. angulata)
- Dense and velvety, bright white to occasionally light brownish, spreading on leaf undersides; on Mexican white oaks (Leucomexicana clade) and their hybrids: Cystotheca mexicana
- Thick and rough, first white then turning brown, often stunting or distorting new shoots, in western North America: Cystotheca lanestris

Quercus sect. Virentes

- On south-eastern live oaks: Erysiphe quercus-virginianae
- Thick and rough, first white then turning brown, often stunting or distorting new shoots, in western North America: Cystotheca lanestris

== European oaks ==
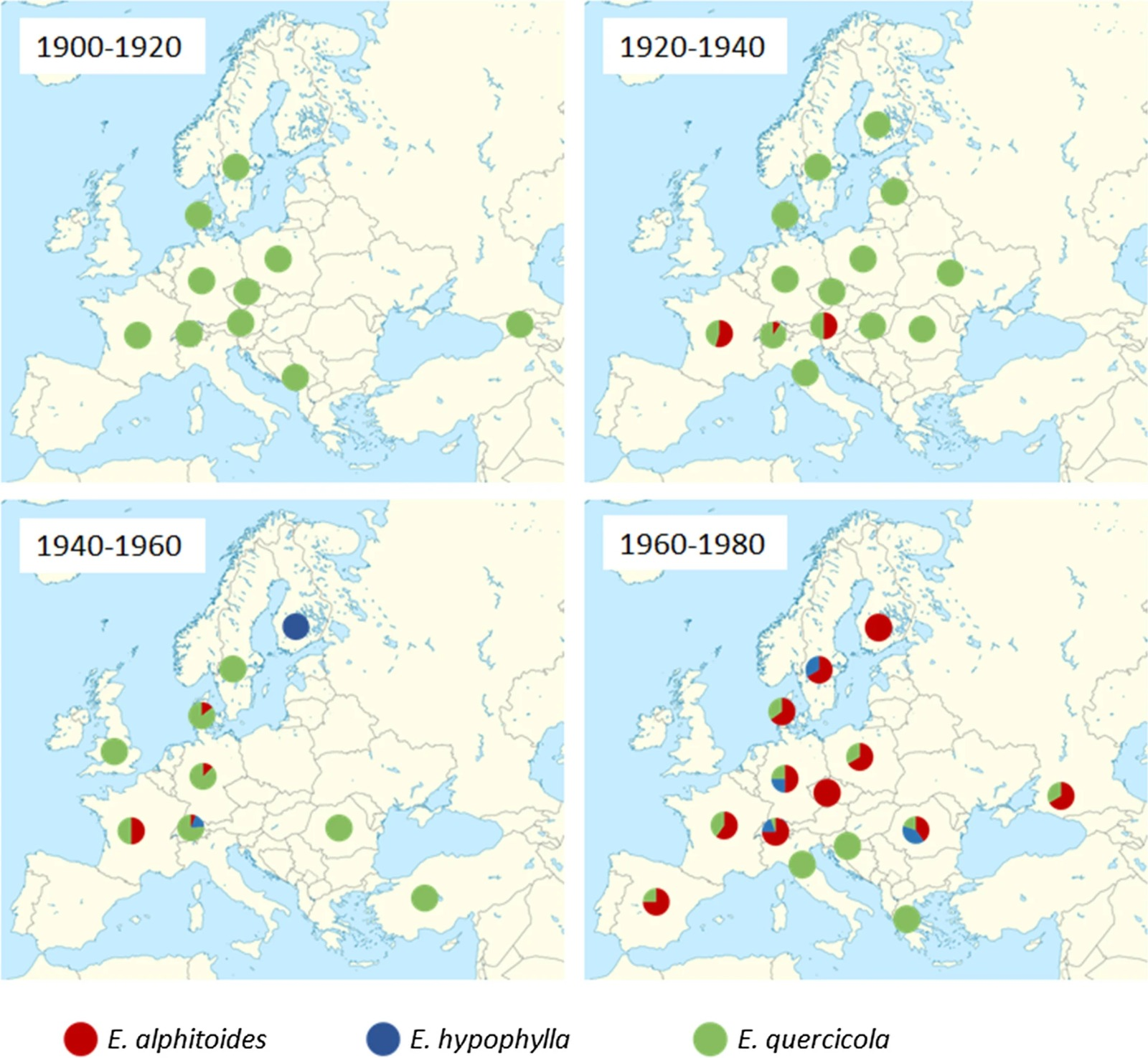
The change in the proportion of herbaria samples belonging to the three Erysiphe species on Quercus in Europe.

Four species of powdery mildew are known from oaks in Europe, although there is the possibility of other species transported from the Americas establishing themselves in the continent. Two species are generally found on leaf uppersides (and sometimes on both uppersides and undersides) and two on the undersides only.

Uppersides/both

- Erysiphe alphitoides, originating in the tropics, was introduced to Europe around the 1920s and has since become the most common species on Quercus in the continent. It has also been reported on a wide variety of other species including beech (Fagus) and Wisteria. It is considered indistinguishable from Erysiphe quercicola macroscopically and microscopically. The first species introduced to oaks in Europe was referred to as Erysiphe alphitoides but was in fact E. quercicola. Some combination of these two species has been introduced on hosts such as Quercus robur to almost all continents of the world, and in many cases more work is needed to determine which of the species are present.
- Erysiphe quercicola, also of East Asian origin, was the earliest introduction into Europe, in the early 1900s. It may be the case that this species generally causes brown lesions while Erysiphe alphitoides does not, but this needs more research and is not conclusive. As a result, identification of epiphyllous or amphigenous mildew on Quercus in Europe cannot be placed to species-level without genetic sequencing.

Undersides

- Erysiphe hypophylla is another introduced species. This is a faint hypophyllous mildew with sparse chasmothecia, first detected in Europe in a sample from the 1940s.
- Phyllactinia roboris is thought to be native to Europe. It forms faint, smooth patches on leaf undersides and has long narrow appendages typical of the genus.
