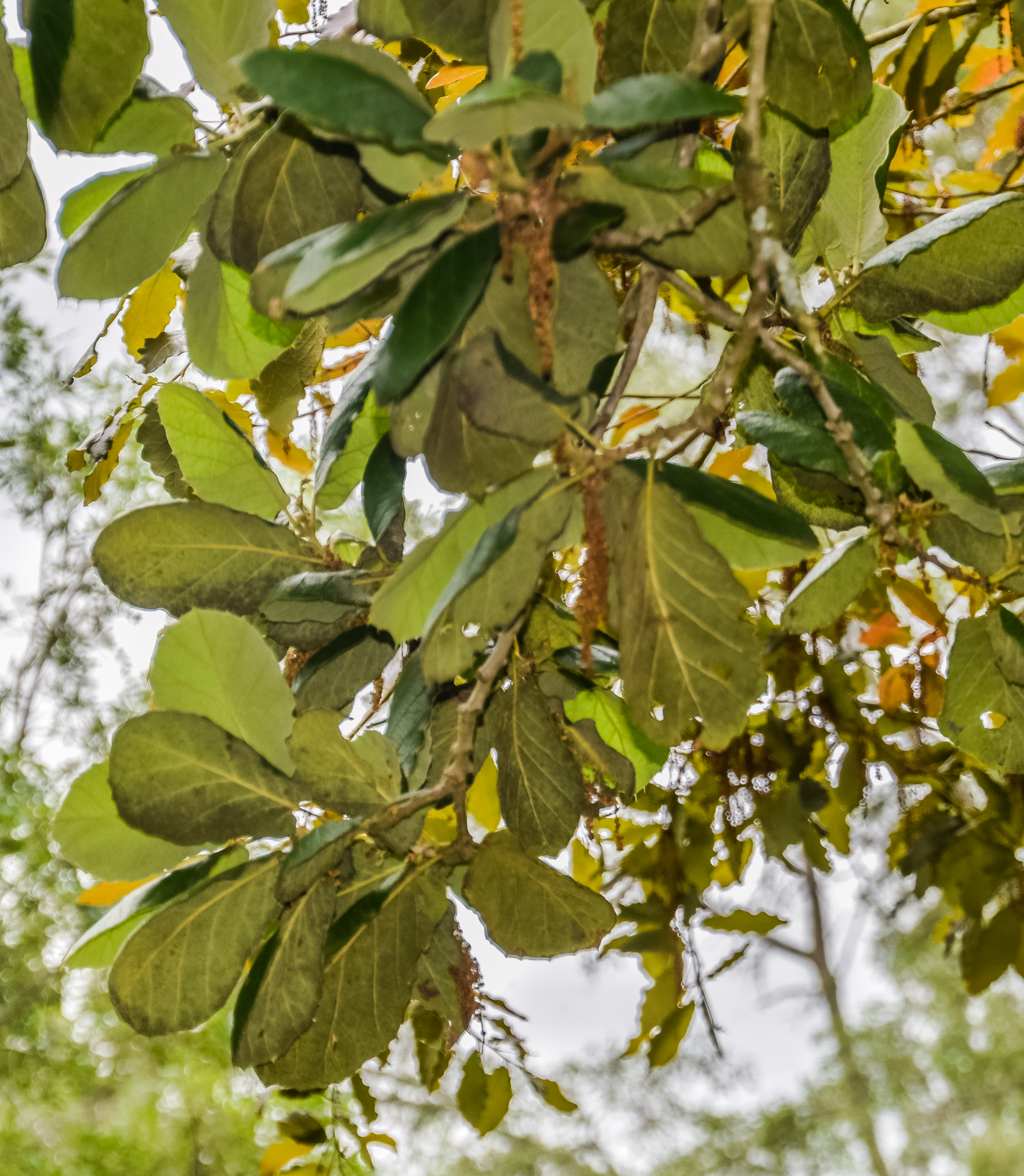

Conservation status
- Least Concern (IUCN 3.1)

Scientific classification
- Kingdom: Plantae
- Clade: Embryophytes
- Clade: Tracheophytes
- Clade: Spermatophytes
- Clade: Angiosperms
- Clade: Eudicots
- Clade: Rosids
- Order: Fagales
- Family: Fagaceae
- Genus: Quercus
- Subgenus: Quercus subg. Quercus
- Section: Quercus sect. Quercus
- Species: Q. obtusata

Binomial name
- Quercus obtusata Bonpl.

Synonyms
- List: Quercus alvarezensis Trel.; Quercus atriglans E.F.Warb.; Quercus crenatifolia Trel.; Quercus hartwegii Benth.; Quercus hartwegii f. glabrata Trel.; Quercus obtusata var. hartwegii (Benth.) A.DC.; Quercus obtusata var. pandurata (Bonpl.) A.DC.; Quercus pandurata Bonpl.; Quercus pandurata var. hartwegii (Benth.) Wenz.; Quercus panduriformis Trel.; Quercus panduriformis f. colimensis Trel.; Quercus panduriformis f. rubrinervis Trel.; Quercus spicata Bonpl.

= Quercus obtusata =

Species of oak tree

Quercus obtusata is an oak in the white oak group (Quercus sect. Quercus) endemic to Mexico, with a distribution ranging from San Luis Potosí and Nayarit south to Oaxaca. It is native to the southern Sierra Madre Occidental, Trans-Mexican Volcanic Belt, and Sierra Madre del Sur, where it grows in oak forest, pine–oak forest, and the transition to dry shrubland from 1,240 to 2,630 metres elevation. It is often associated with Quercus crassipes, Q. crassifolia, Q. × dysophylla, Q. laeta, and Q. rugosa.

Quercus obtusata is a tree up to 20 metres (66 feet) tall with a trunk sometimes more than 60 centimetres (24 inches) in diameter. The leaves are thick and leathery, up to 22 cm (8 3/4 in) long, widely egg-shaped with 3–9 pairs of shallow rounded lobes or undulations.

Resembles Q. potosina, which has smaller leaves (3–10 x 2–6 cm); also resembles Q. rugosa, this one has a convex leaf strongly coriaceous, a revolute margin, the epidermis bullate; at least, one can differentiate Q. obtusata from Q. laeta, which has foliar underside glaucous, without masses of glandular secretions, none or rare glandular trichomes, a leaf more oblong than oboval with a margin sometimes entire.

== Gallery ==
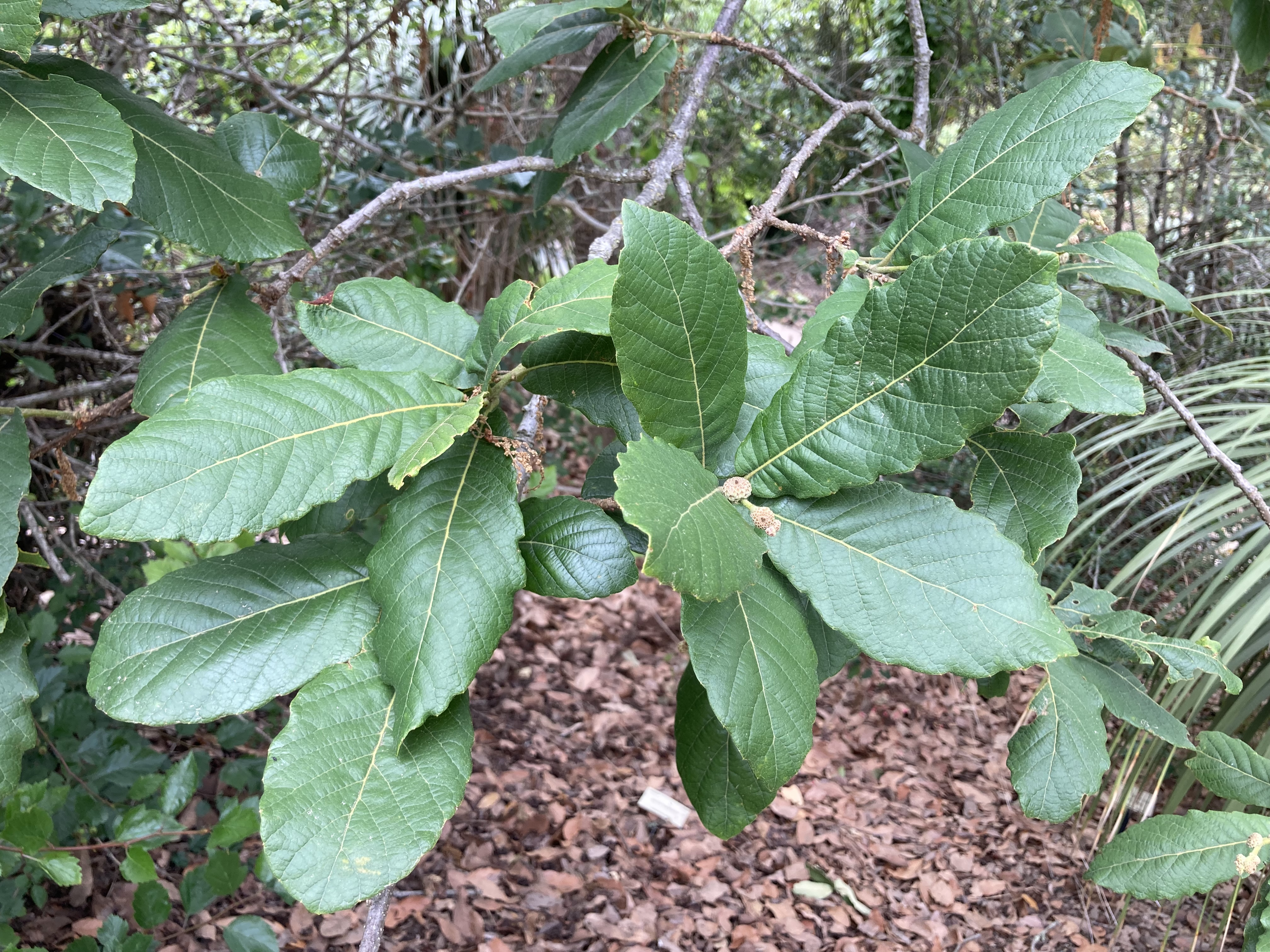
Mature leaves

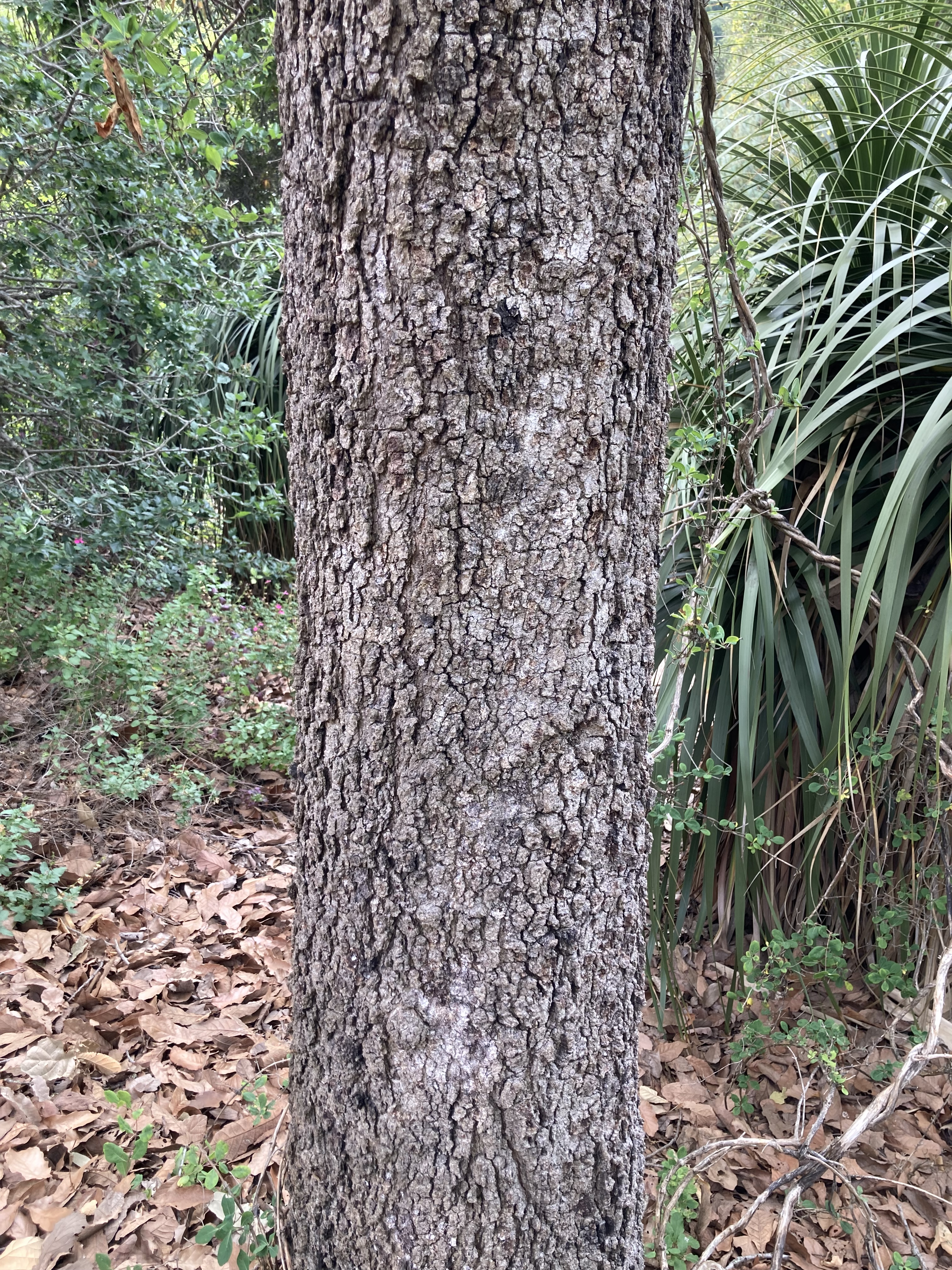
Bark of a specimen at UC Berkeley Botanic Gardens

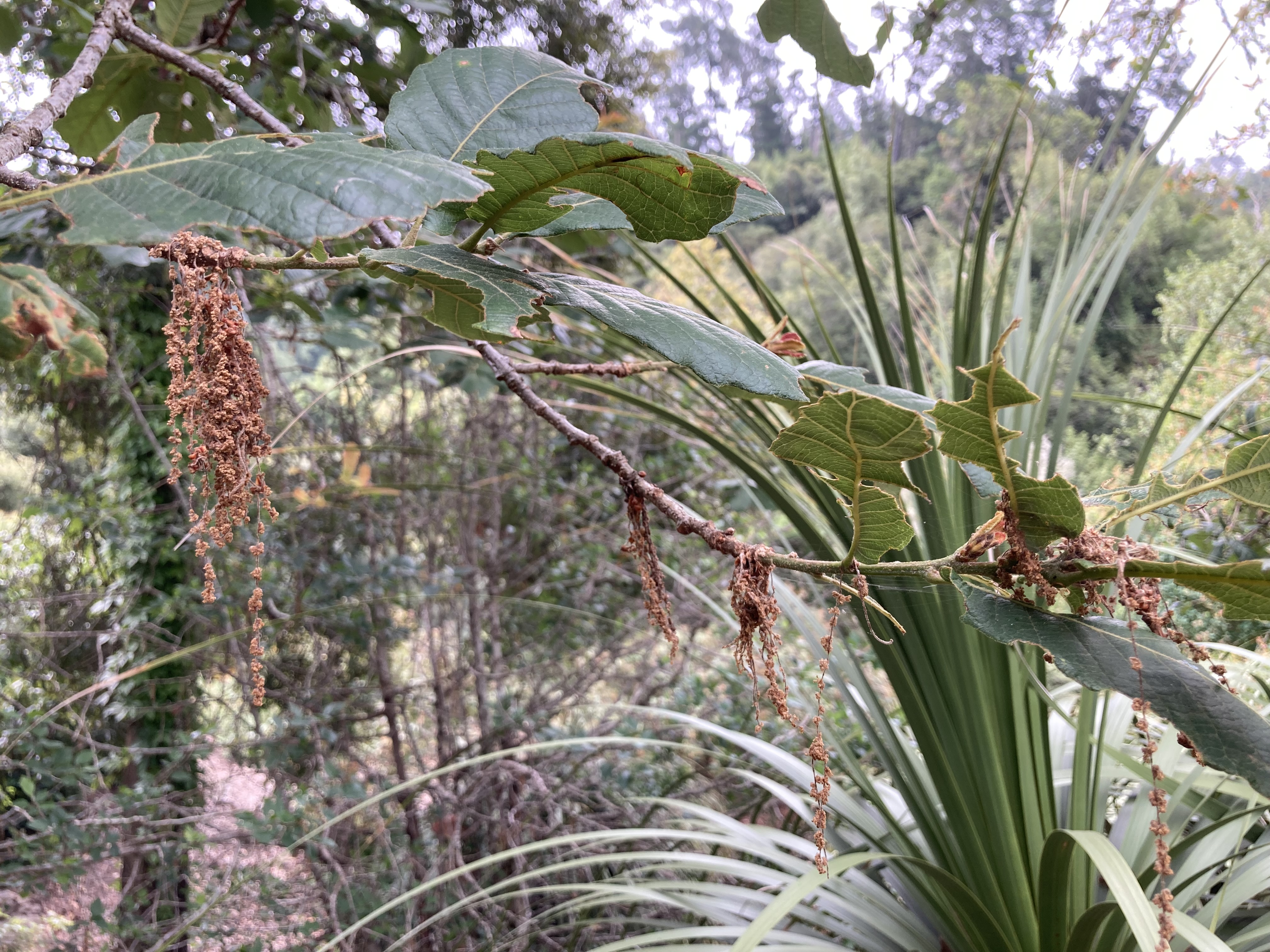
Details of the catkins
