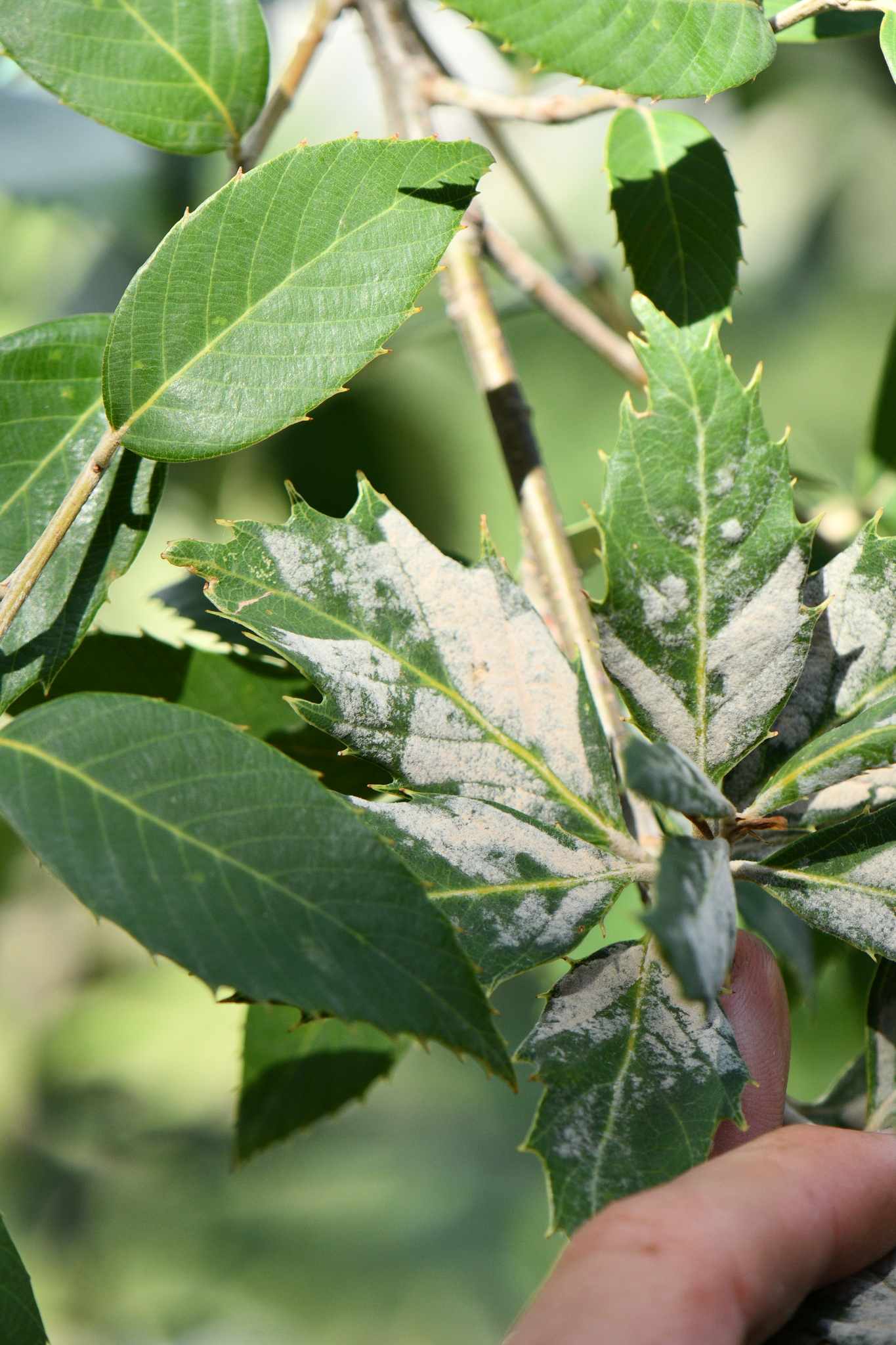
- Cystotheca quercina on Quercus leucotrichophora in India.

Scientific classification
- Kingdom: Fungi
- Division: Ascomycota
- Class: Leotiomycetes
- Order: Helotiales
- Family: Erysiphaceae
- Genus: Cystotheca
- Species: C. quercina

Binomial name
- Cystotheca quercina N. Ahmad, A.K. Sarbhoy, Kamal & D.K. Agarwal, 2006

= Cystotheca quercina =

Species of fungus

Cystotheca quercina is a species of powdery mildew in the family Erysiphaceae. It is found in Asia on plants in the genus Quercus.

== Description ==
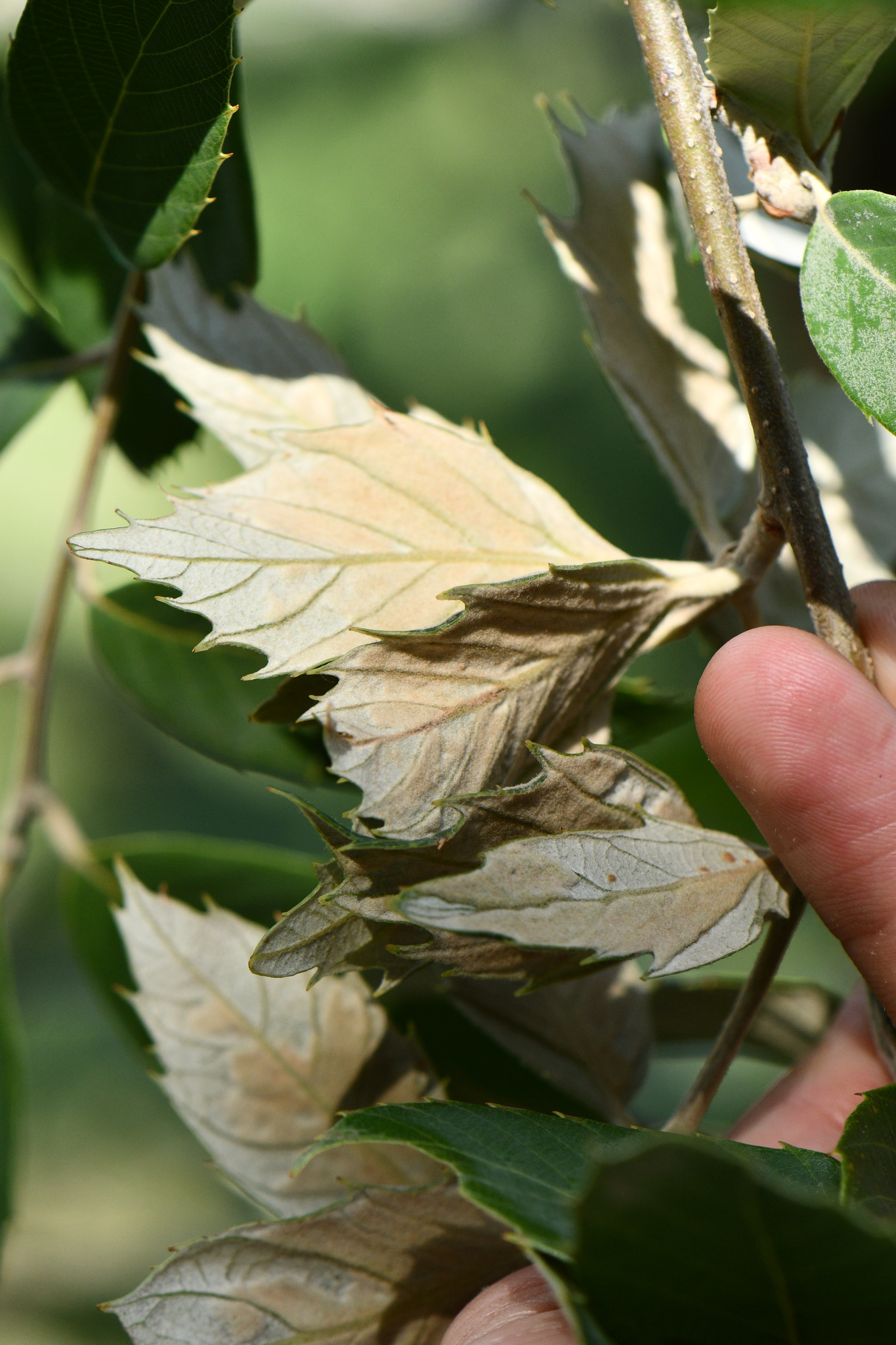
Cystotheca quercina on Quercus leucotrichophora in India (as seen from the underside).

Many Cystotheca species form dense, white or brown, distorting patches on the leaves of their hosts. Some species in this genus are also known to cause witch's-broom galls on their hosts. Cystotheca nanyuensis, like most Erysiphaceae, is highly host-specific and is only known to infect Quercus leucotrichophora. It has been recorded from India and Pakistan. This species is similar to Cystotheca wrightii but differs in that it forms white, thin primary mycelium, has larger ascomata, up to 95 μm diameter, and 4–5(–8)-spored asci.

== Taxonomy ==
The fungus was formally described in 2006 by N. Ahmad, A.K. Sarbhoy, Kamal and D.K. Agarwal. The type specimen was collected in India. The specific epithet derives from the host genus.
