= Cystotheca mexicana =

Scientific classification
- Kingdom: Fungi
- Division: Ascomycota
- Class: Leotiomycetes
- Order: Helotiales
- Family: Erysiphaceae
- Genus: Cystotheca
- Species: C. mexicana

Binomial name
- Cystotheca mexicana M. Bradshaw, Coombes & Cont.-Paredes, 2023

Species of fungus

Cystotheca mexicana is a species of powdery mildew in the family Erysiphaceae. It is found in Mexico on plants in the genus Quercus.

== Description ==
Cystotheca mexicana forms white mycelium on the underside of leaves. Cystotheca mexicana, like most Erysiphaceae, is highly host-specific and only infects species in the genus Quercus. It has only been found on oak hybrids with at least one species endemic to Mexico, including Quercus glaucoides × Quercus microphylla and Q. liebmannii × Q. microphylla. Another species infecting Quercus in North America, Cystotheca lanestris, is found on a variety of oak species, and can be found in north-western Mexico. This species can cause witch's-broom galls. Microscopically, C. lanestris has fibrosin bodies and longer special aerial hyphae than C. mexicana.

== Taxonomy ==
The fungus was formally described in 2023 by Michael Bradshaw, Allen J. Coombes and Carlos Contreras-Paredes. The type specimen was collected in Mexico, the country from which the specific epithet also takes its name.
