= Cystotheca nanyuensis =

Scientific classification
- Kingdom: Fungi
- Division: Ascomycota
- Class: Leotiomycetes
- Order: Helotiales
- Family: Erysiphaceae
- Genus: Cystotheca
- Species: C. nanyuensis

Binomial name
- Cystotheca nanyuensis (J.L. Zhou) U. Braun, 2012

Synonyms
- Cystotheca wrightii var. nanyuensis J.L. Zhou, 1998

Species of fungus

Cystotheca nanyuensis is a species of powdery mildew in the family Erysiphaceae. It is found in Asia on plants in the genus Quercus.

== Description ==
Many Cystotheca species form dense, white or brown, distorting patches on the leaves of their hosts. Some species in this genus are also known to cause witch's-broom galls on their hosts. Cystotheca nanyuensis, like most Erysiphaceae, is highly host-specific and only infects species in the genus Quercus. It is currently only known from the type collection, on Quercus hypargyrea.

== Taxonomy ==
The fungus was formally described in 1998 by J.L. Zhou as a variety of C. wrightii with the basionym C. wrightii var. nanyuensis. The variety was elevated to species by Uwe Braun in 2012. The type specimen was collected in China.

== Host and Pathology ==
- Cystotheca nanyuensis is highly host-specific, currently known only from Quercus hypargyrea. Like other powdery mildew fungi, it forms dense white patches on leaf surfaces, which may lead to distortion or reduced photosynthetic capacity. The infection is superficial but can cause significant aesthetic damage. No economic impact has been documented, but its specificity suggests a co-evolutionary relationship with its host.
