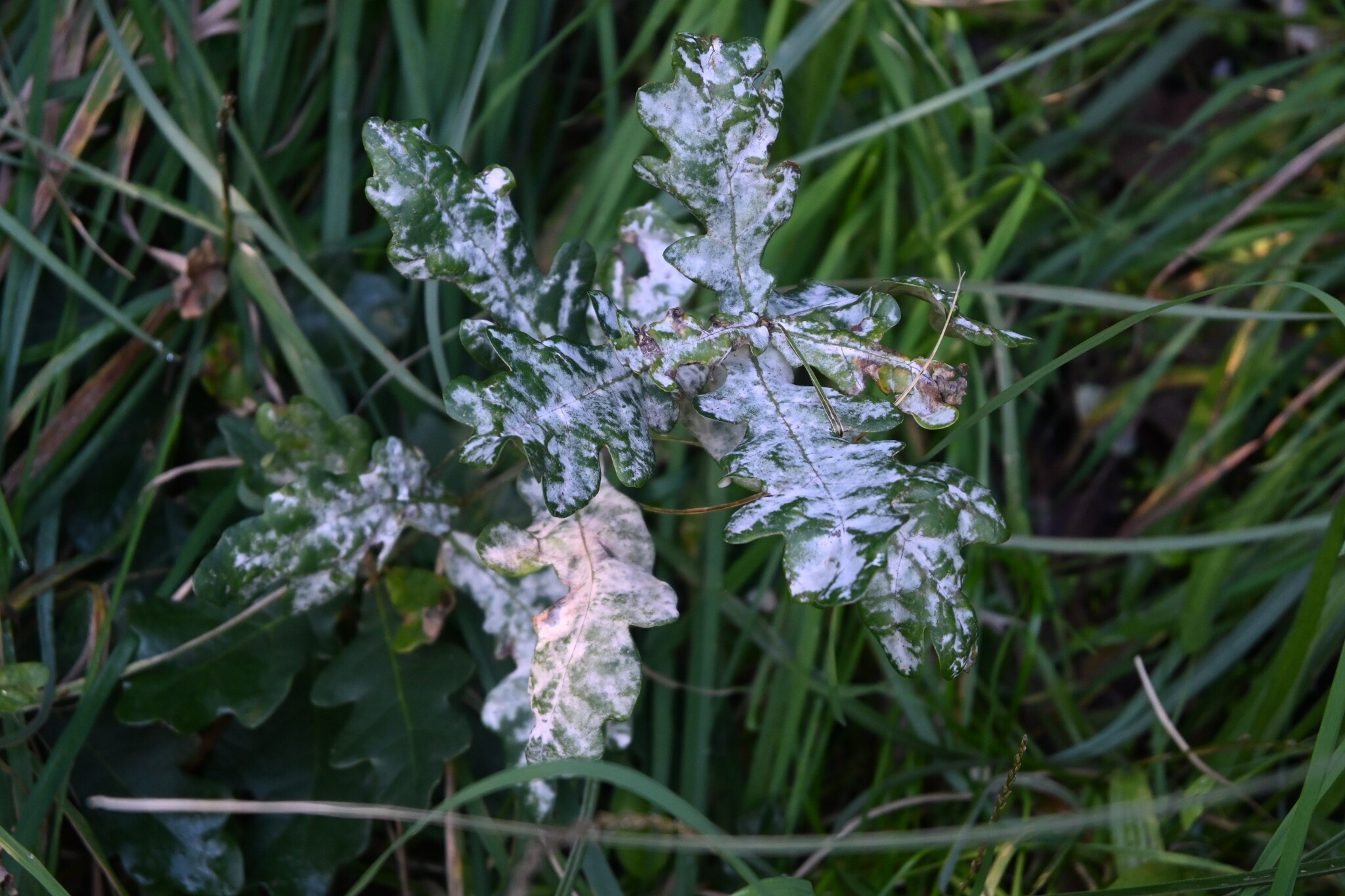
- Erysiphe alphitoides on Quercus robur in New Zealand

Scientific classification
- Kingdom: Fungi
- Division: Ascomycota
- Class: Leotiomycetes
- Order: Helotiales
- Family: Erysiphaceae
- Genus: Erysiphe
- Species: E. alphitoides

Binomial name
- Erysiphe alphitoides (Griffon & Maubl.) U. Braun & S. Takam., 2000

Synonyms
- Microsphaera alphitoides Griffon & Maubl., 1912; Microsphaera alni var. quercina Neger, 1915; Microsphaera alni f. quercus-glanduliferae Hara, 1915; Microsphaera dentatae Liou, 1931; Microsphaera alni var. dentatae (Liou) F.L. Tai, 1951; Microsphaera penicillata f. fagi Jacz., 1927; Microsphaera penicillata f. aesculi P.D. Marchenko, 1976; Oidium alphitoides Griffon & Maubl., 1910; Fusidium quercinum (Mesnier) Thüm., 1878

= Erysiphe alphitoides =

Species of fungus

Erysiphe alphitoides is a species of powdery mildew in the family Erysiphaceae. It is found across the world on every continent except Antarctica, where it primarily infects plants in the genus Quercus (oaks). It has also been recorded with varying degrees of likelihood on other plants, including Aesculus (horse chestnut), Castanea (sweet chestnut), Fagus (beech) and Wisteria.

== Description ==
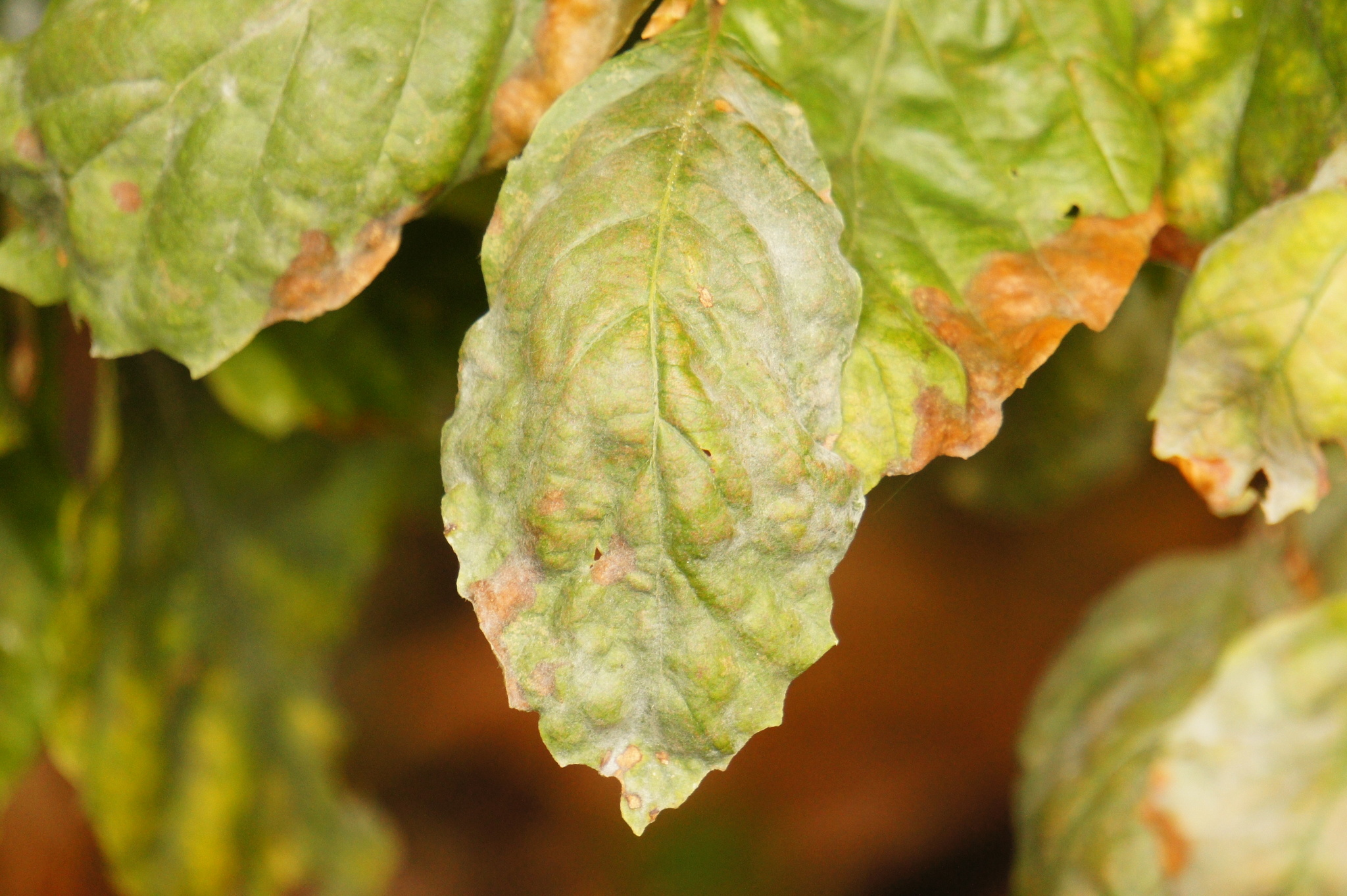
Erysiphe alphitoides is also reported to infect species of Fagus in Eurasia

The fungus forms white mycelial growth on both sides of the leaves of its host. The leaves can sometimes be distorted by the presence of the powdery mildew. When present, the chasmothecia can be scattered or gregarious. As the pathogen develops late in spring, after the first leaves of oak seedlings have developed, it is more prevalent on the second and third flushes of leaves that develop in July and August. In Europe especially, the disease can be very severe on Quercus robur and Quercus petraea in particular, and is often most damaging to young trees. In mature trees, infection is generally less damaging, but can contribute to a tree's decline in health. A study of the effects of E. alphitoides on Quercus robur found it decreased stomatal conductance by 15–30%, decreased the nitrogen content of the leaf and increased dark respiration. Carbon fixation was also reduced in infected leaves by about 40–50% in fully infected leaves. Heavily infected leaves also tend to fall earlier than those less infected. Despite it affecting the ability of leaves to photosynthesise, the impact on the plant is relatively low and this is thought to explain why the disease has only moderate consequences for oak trees health despite heavy infections.

As with most Erysiphaceae, Erysiphe alphitoides is fairly host-specific, mostly occurring on Quercus species. This genus is also a host for a great many other powdery mildew species around the world. In the Americas, E. alphitoides is fairly rare and almost exclusive to Quercus robur. In Eurasia, it cannot be distinguished from Erysiphe quercicola without genetic sequencing. Erysiphe alphitoides can be found worldwide, wherever its host species are found.

== History ==
Today, Erysiphe alphitoides is one of the most common pathogens in Europe, and is widespread around the world, but this was not always the case. Before 1907, the only powdery mildew species recorded from oak in Europe was Phyllactinia roboris (as Phyllactinia guttata). However, that year, a new and different species arrived on the continent and spread rapidly around France, Spain, Luxembourg and the Netherlands. Within two years it had reached Russia and Türkiye and not long after it had been recorded worldwide.

The sudden epidemic of this mystery disease puzzled mycologists of the time. It did not fit any known species on oak, so it was theorised that it was introduced from elsewhere, such as North America, where powdery mildew on oak had been reported before. However, the new species did not infect American red oaks in France, which make this theory unlikely. In 1912, Griffon and Maublanc named the new species Microsphaera alphitoides. The type specimen was not preserved, so in 2007 a neotype was designated by Susumu Takamatsu et al.: a sample of oak powdery mildew collected in Switzerland in 1999. At the time, three species of powdery mildew were known on European oaks: Phyllactinia roboris, Erysiphe alphitoides, and Erysiphe hypophylla, which is also thought to be introduced. Unbeknownst to Takamatsu et al., a fourth species was also present – Erysiphe quercicola, which in 2007 was only known from Japan.

In 2021, it was revealed that the epidemic of oak-infecting powdery mildew in Europe actually came in two waves. One species was introduced around the time of the first reports of the new species in the early 1900s, described as Erysiphe alphitoides. However, from around 1920, another species arrived unnoticed, and after a period of around three decades of fairly low concentration, it began to almost replace the former species throughout its European range. It is this second species which corresponded to the neotype of Erysiphe alphitoides, and the 'original' E. alphitoides as described by Griffon and Maublanc was actually Erysiphe quercicola, which is indistinguishable without genetic sequencing.

The origin of both these species is likely to have been from the tropics. Erysiphe quercicola has been shown to be conspecific with Oidium mangiferae and other tropical species, and it would make sense for Erysiphe alphitoides to have a similar origin, though despite their similarity morphologically, they are not particularly closely related. It is likely the case that E. alphitoides 'jumped host' to initially infect oaks. It has been reported doing the same to infect Wisteria, perhaps due to the fact that it is high in oak tannin, but these infections become a dead end after the first generation of conidia.

== Taxonomy ==
The fungus was originally described in 1912 by Griffon and Maublanc with the basionym Microsphaera alphitoides. The type specimen was collected in France in 1911. The species was transferred to the genus Erysiphe by Uwe Braun and Susumu Takamtsu in 2000. The specific epithet refers to its floury appearance, derived from the Greek word álphiton, meaning 'barley meal' or 'flour', and the suffix -oeides, meaning 'like' or 'resembling'. Uwe Braun introduced the variety E. alphitoides var. chenii (as Microsphaera alphitoides var. chenii) in 1982 for collections on Quercus chenii in China. It is characterised by having longer and more flexuous appendages. This is now considered conspecific with Erysiphe epigena.

== Micromorphology ==
=== Description ===
The mycelium is white or greyish, commonly found on either the upper- or both sides of the leaf. The hyphal appressoria are lobed, and occur both solitarily and in opposite pairs. Conidophores arise centrally or slightly laterally from their mother cell. They are erect with cylindrical foot cells that are straight or occasionally curved. The conidiophores produce single conidia. The primary conidia are roughly ellipsoid with a rounded apex. Secondary conidia are barrel-shaped. Germ tubes can be anywhere from short to very long. Conidial appressoria vary but tend to be lobed. The chasmothecia (fruiting bodies) have 4–28 stiff appendages around the equator, which are fairly densely dichotomously branched 4–6 times towards the tip. They may be pigmented at the base. The peridium of the chasmothecia has cells of irregular shape. Erysiphe alphitoides has six to eight spores per ascus which are roughly ellipsoid and colourless. The asci are typically clavate or saccate and are either sessile or short-stalked.

=== Measurements ===
Hyphal cells measure 30–70 × 3–7 μm. Hyphal appressoria are 3–10 μm in diameter. Conidiophores are up to 95 μm long on the upper surface of the leaf but up to 200 μm long on the lower surface, with foot cells that measure 15–40 × 6–9(–10) μm (although sometimes much longer on the lower surface of the leaf). Secondary conidia are 25–40(–45) × 13–25 μm. The chasmothecia are (70–)80–140(–180) μm in diameter with peridium cells 8–25(–30) μm in diameter. Appendages are up to 2× the diameter of the chasmothecia and 6–12.5 μm wide near the base. Where they branch, the appendages measure 35–80 × 25–70 μm. Asci number 4–16 and are 40–80 × 30–55 μm with ascospores measuring (13–)16–26 × (7–)9–15 μm.
