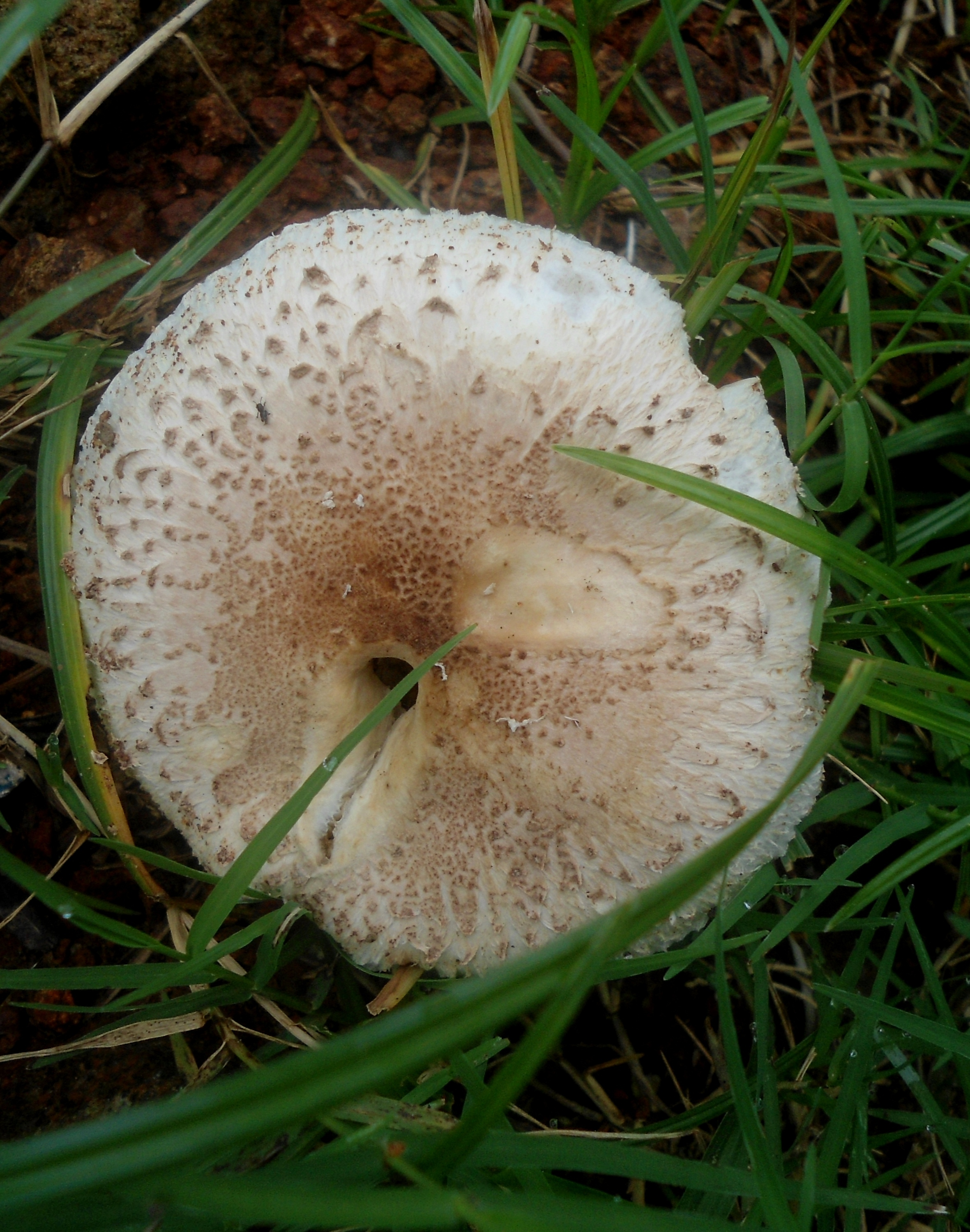
- L. abbotanus at Kambalakonda Wildlife Sanctuary in Visakhapatnam, India

Scientific classification
- Domain: Eukaryota
- Kingdom: Fungi
- Division: Basidiomycota
- Class: Agaricomycetes
- Order: Russulales
- Family: Russulaceae
- Genus: Lactarius
- Species: L. abbotanus

Binomial name
- Lactarius abbotanus K. Das & J.R. Sharma (2003)

= Lactarius abbotanus =

Species of fungus

Lactarius abbotanus is a member of the large milk-cap genus Lactarius in the order Russulales. It is found in India, and was first described by mycologists J. R. Sharma and Kanad Das in 2003.

== Description ==
The cap is convex with a depressed center, measuring between 64 and 83 mm in diameter. The lamellae are yellowish white and distant, with about 4 being observed per 10 mm. The stipe measures from 38 to 45 mm in height and from 14 to 18 mm in diameter, being cilyndrical or having a slightly wider base. It is hollow, with the base being hairy. L. abbotanus exudes white latex, which turns brilliant to yellow immediately after exposure to air. This species is closely related to L. citriolens, L. delicatus and L. aquizonatus.

Mycological characteristics
- Gills on hymenium
- Cap is convex
- Spore print is yellow
- Ecology is mycorrhizal

== Distribution and ecology ==
The species was observed as solitary, forming ectomycorrhizae with specimens of Quercus leucotrichophora in temperate deciduous forests of the Kumaon mountains. The type specimens were collected in Abbot Mount, Champawat, Uttaranchal. The species is named after the type locality; where they were observed at an altitude of 2200 m.

== See also ==
- List of Lactarius species
