= Cystotheca kusanoi =

Scientific classification
- Kingdom: Fungi
- Division: Ascomycota
- Class: Leotiomycetes
- Order: Helotiales
- Family: Erysiphaceae
- Genus: Cystotheca
- Species: C. kusanoi

Binomial name
- Cystotheca kusanoi (Henn. & Shirai) S.E. Cho & H.D. Shin, 2018

Synonyms
- Sphaerotheca kusanoi Henn. & Shirai, 1901

Species of fungus

Cystotheca kusanoi is a species of powdery mildew in the family Erysiphaceae. It is found in Asia on plants in the genus Quercus.

== Description ==
Many Cystotheca species form dense, white or brown, distorting patches on the leaves of their hosts. Some species in this genus are also known to cause witch's-broom galls on their hosts. Cystotheca kusanoi, like most Erysiphaceae, is fairly host-specific and only infects species in the genus Quercus. C. kusanoi does not form conspicuous fibrosin bodies in fresh conidia.

== Taxonomy ==
The fungus was formally described in 1901 by Hennings and Shirai with the basionym Sphaerotheca kusanoi, but was considered conspecific with Cystotheca lanestris before the new combination Cystotheca kusanoi was created by S.E. Cho and H.D. Shin in 2018. C. lanestris was previously also reported on Castanea mollissima, Castanopsis tibetana, Lithocarpus dealbatus, Lithocarpus harlandii, and Lithocarpus edulis in Asia. These records are unclear and in need of revision. Cystotheca lanestris is now considered confined to North America.
