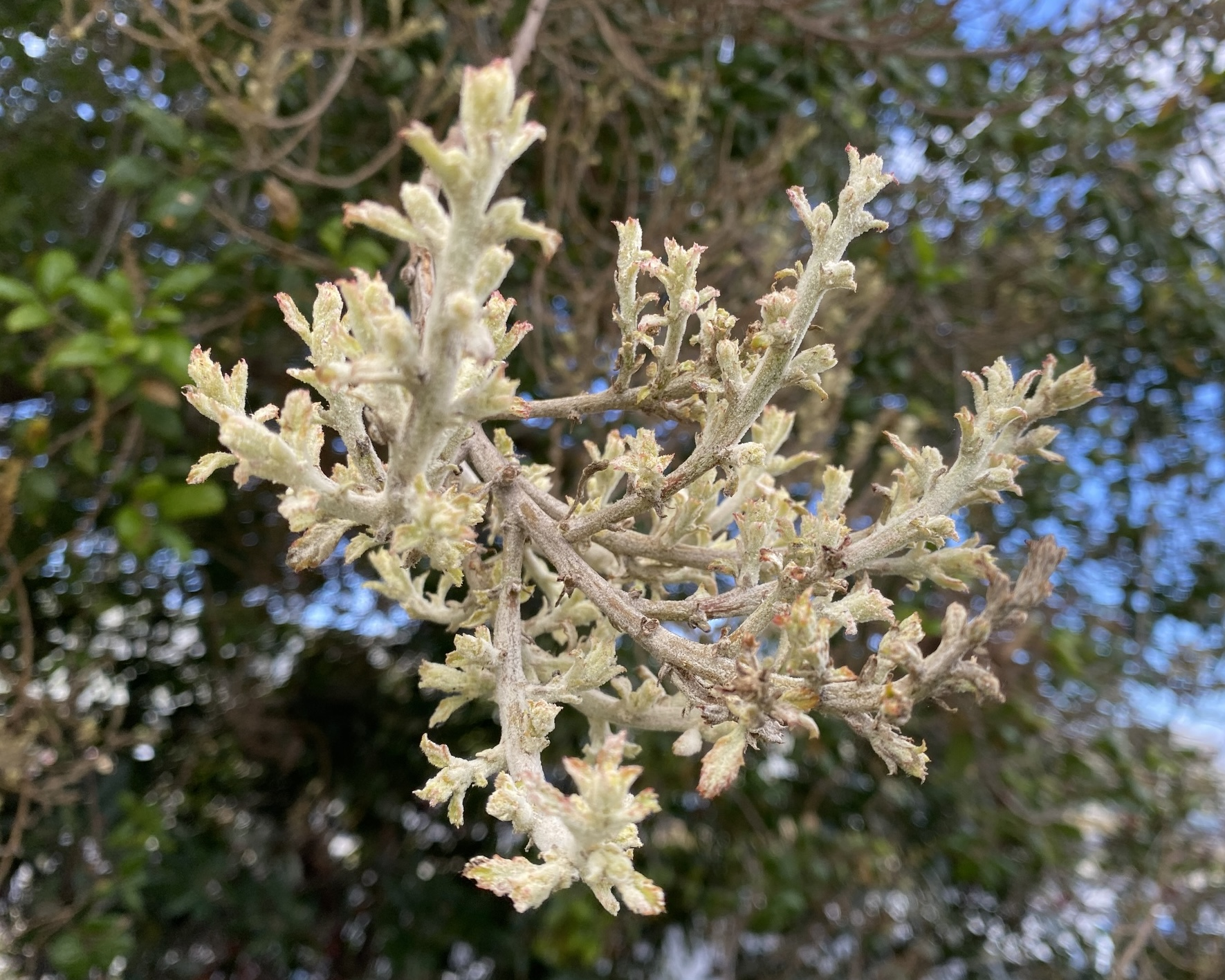
- Cystotheca lanestris witch's broom on Quercus in California

Scientific classification
- Kingdom: Fungi
- Division: Ascomycota
- Class: Leotiomycetes
- Order: Helotiales
- Family: Erysiphaceae
- Genus: Cystotheca; Berk. & Curtis, 1860

Type species
- Cystotheca wrightii Berk. & M.A. Curtis, 1860

= Cystotheca =

Genus of fungi

Cystotheca is a genus of plant pathogenic fungi in the family Erysiphaceae (powdery mildews). Members of the genus are found on Calophyllum, Castanea, Castanopsis, Murraya and Quercus species in Asia and North America.

== Description ==
Many Cystotheca species form dense, white or brown, distorting patches on the leaves of their hosts. Some species in this genus are also known to cause witch's-broom galls. The distribution of this genus is limited to Asia (from the Himalayas to Indonesia and Japan) and North America (western United States to southern Central America). Only Cystotheca lanestris and Cystotheca mexicana are not found in Asia.

== Taxonomy ==
The genus was once considered conspecific with Sphaerotheca, but Cystotheca is well-distinguished by the presence of special aerial hyphae (with the exception of one species) and the chasmothecial wall being separated into two distinct layers. Cystotheca is phylogenetically close to Podosphaera.

== Species ==
The genus comprises the following species:

- Cystotheca castanopsidis (Meeboon & S. Takam.) Meeboon & S. Takam., 2017
- Cystotheca esetacea Z.X. Chen & Y.J. Yao, 1993
- Cystotheca indica M.S. Patil & Maham., 1999
- Cystotheca kusanoi (Henn. & Shirai) S.E. Cho & H.D. Shin, 2018
- Cystotheca lanestris (Harkn.) Miyabe, 1909
- Cystotheca mexicana M. Bradshaw, Coombes & Cont.-Paredes, 2023
- Cystotheca nanyuensis (J.L. Zhou) U. Braun, 2012
- Cystotheca quercina N. Ahmad, A.K. Sarbhoy, Kamal & D.K. Agarwal, 2006
- Cystotheca tjibodensis (Gäum.) Katum., 1973
- Cystotheca vignae M.S. Patil & Maham., 1999
- Cystotheca wrightii Berk. & M.A. Curtis, 1858
- Setoidium murrayae (Hosag., U. Braun & Rabindran) U. Braun & R.T.A. Cook, 2012
