= Cystotheca castanopsidis =

Scientific classification
- Kingdom: Fungi
- Division: Ascomycota
- Class: Leotiomycetes
- Order: Helotiales
- Family: Erysiphaceae
- Genus: Cystotheca
- Species: C. castanopsidis

Binomial name
- Cystotheca castanopsidis (Meeboon & S. Takam.) Meeboon & S. Takam., 2017

Synonyms
- Sphaerotheca castanopsis Meeboon & S. Takam, 2012

Species of fungus

Cystotheca castanopsidis is a species of powdery mildew in the family Erysiphaceae. It is found on plants in the genus Castanopsis.

== Description ==
Many Cystotheca species form dense, white or brown, distorting patches on the leaves of their hosts. Some species in this genus are also known to cause witch's-broom galls. Cystotheca castanopsidis, like most Erysiphaceae, is highly host-specific and only infects species in the genus Castanopsis. Also found on the same genus are Cystotheca tjibodensis and Cystotheca esetacea. C. esetacea is characterized by forming brown mycelium without aerial hyphae.

== Taxonomy ==
The fungus was formally described in 2012 by Jamjan Meeboon and Susumu Takamatsu with the basionym Setoidium castanopsidis, before being transferred to the genus Cystotheca in 2017. The species epithet refers to the host genus. The type specimen was collected in Indonesia.
