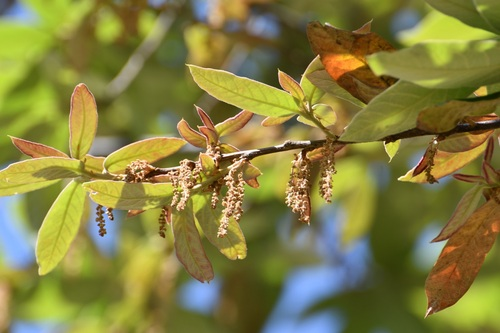

Scientific classification
- Kingdom: Plantae
- Clade: Tracheophytes
- Clade: Angiosperms
- Clade: Eudicots
- Clade: Rosids
- Order: Fagales
- Family: Fagaceae
- Genus: Quercus
- Subgenus: Quercus subg. Quercus
- Section: Quercus sect. Lobatae
- Species: Q. × dysophylla

Binomial name
- Quercus × dysophylla Benth.

Synonyms
- List: Quercus × esperanzae Trel.; Quercus × fournieri Trel.; Quercus × hahnii Trel.; Quercus × sagata E.F.Warb.

= Quercus × dysophylla =

Species of oak tree

Quercus × dysophylla is a species of oak tree. It grows in central Mexico in Hidalgo, México State, D.F., Puebla, Michoacán, and San Luis Potosí. Its parents are Q. crassifolia and Q. crassipes, both members of section Lobatae.

It is a tree growing up to 20 metres (66 feet) tall. The leaves are thick and leathery, up to 17 centimetres (6 3/4 inches) long, elliptical with no teeth or lobes.
