= Cystotheca vignae =

Scientific classification
- Kingdom: Fungi
- Division: Ascomycota
- Class: Leotiomycetes
- Order: Helotiales
- Family: Erysiphaceae
- Genus: Cystotheca
- Species: C. vignae

Binomial name
- Cystotheca vignae M.S. Patil & Maham., 1999

Species of fungus

Cystotheca vignae is a species of powdery mildew in the family Erysiphaceae. It is found in Asia on plants in the genus Vigna.

== Description ==
Many Cystotheca species form dense, white or brown, distorting patches on the leaves of their hosts. Some species in this genus are also known to cause witch's-broom galls on their hosts. Cystotheca vignae, like most Erysiphaceae, is highly host-specific and is only known to infect Vigna. Other species of powdery mildew are also found on the same genus, such as Erysiphe vignae.

== Taxonomy ==
The fungus was formally described in 1999 by M.S. Patil and Mahamulkar.
