= Cystotheca esetacea =

Scientific classification
- Kingdom: Fungi
- Division: Ascomycota
- Class: Leotiomycetes
- Order: Helotiales
- Family: Erysiphaceae
- Genus: Cystotheca
- Species: C. esetacea

Binomial name
- Cystotheca esetacea Z.X. Chen & Y.J. Yao, 1993

Species of fungus

Cystotheca esetacea is a species of powdery mildew in the family Erysiphaceae. It is found in Asia on plants in the genus Castanopsis.

== Description ==
Many Cystotheca species form dense, white or brown, distorting patches on the leaves of their hosts. Some species in this genus are also known to cause witch's-broom galls. Cystotheca esetacea, like most Erysiphaceae, is highly host-specific and only infects species in the genus Castanopsis. Also found on the same genus are Cystotheca tjibodensis and Cystotheca castanopsidis. C. esetacea is characterized by forming brown mycelium without aerial hyphae.

== Taxonomy ==
The fungus was formally described in 1993 by Z.X. Chen and Y.J. Yao. The type specimen was collected in China. The relationship of this species with C. castanopsidis is not yet known and requires further study.
