= Cystotheca indica =

Scientific classification
- Kingdom: Fungi
- Division: Ascomycota
- Class: Leotiomycetes
- Order: Helotiales
- Family: Erysiphaceae
- Genus: Cystotheca
- Species: C. indica

Binomial name
- Cystotheca indica M.S. Patil & Maham., 1999

Species of fungus

Cystotheca indica is a species of powdery mildew in the family Erysiphaceae. It is found in Asia on plants in the genus Calophyllum.

== Description ==
Many Cystotheca species form dense, white or brown, distorting patches on the leaves of their hosts. Some species in this genus are also known to cause witch's-broom galls on their hosts. Cystotheca indica, like most Erysiphaceae, is highly host-specific and is only known to infect Calophyllum.

== Taxonomy ==
The fungus was formally described in 1999 by M.S. Patil &and Mahamulkar. The type material was originally published under the name Arachnomyces nitidus. The type specimen was collected in India, the country from which the specific epithet is derived. According to Bradshaw et al. (2023) C. indica is insufficiently known and doubtful.
