= Setoidium murrayae =

Scientific classification
- Kingdom: Fungi
- Division: Ascomycota
- Class: Leotiomycetes
- Order: Helotiales
- Family: Erysiphaceae
- Genus: Cystotheca
- Species: S. murrayae

Binomial name
- Setoidium murrayae (Hosag., U. Braun & Rabindran) U. Braun & R.T.A. Cook, 2012

Synonyms
- Oidium murrayae Hosag., U. Braun & Rabindran, 1992

Species of fungus

Setoidium murrayae is a species of powdery mildew in the family Erysiphaceae. It is found in Asia on plants in the genus Murraya.

== Description ==
Setoidium murrayae was described on Murraya paniculata, a host species belonging to Rutaceae, with unusual anamorphic characteristics. The conidia were formed in chains and contained fibrosin bodies. The mycelium formed filiform to rarely falcate special aerial hyphae (similar to those of Cystotheca species). Therefore, this anamorphic species was reallocated to Setoidium by Braun and Cook in 2012.

== Taxonomy ==
The fungus was formally described in 1992 by Hosag., Uwe Braun and Rabindran with the basionym Oidium murrayae. The holotype was collected in India. The specific epithet derives from the name of the genus Setoidium murrayae infects. Braun and R.T.A. Cook reassigned this species to Setoidium in 2012. With the implementation of the 'one fungus, one name' change to the Code, the anamorph genus Setoidium was merged with the teleomorph genus Cystotheca. However, a new combination for this species has not been published. The phylogenetic affinity of this species is unclear, particularly given that the host plant does not belong to Fagaceae. Bradshaw et al. (2023) say that sequence analyses are necessary but the holotype is missing.
