= Cystotheca tjibodensis =

Scientific classification
- Kingdom: Fungi
- Division: Ascomycota
- Class: Leotiomycetes
- Order: Helotiales
- Family: Erysiphaceae
- Genus: Cystotheca
- Species: C. tjibodensis

Binomial name
- Cystotheca tjibodensis (Gäum.) Katum., 1973

Species of fungus

Cystotheca tjibodensis is a species of powdery mildew in the family Erysiphaceae. It is found in Asia on plants in the genus Castanopsis.

== Description ==
Many Cystotheca species form dense, white or brown, distorting patches on the leaves of their hosts. Some species in this genus are also known to cause witch's-broom galls on their hosts. Cystotheca tjibodensis, like most Erysiphaceae, is highly host-specific and is only known to infect Castanopsis argentea. It has only been recorded from Indonesia. Also found on the same genus are Cystotheca esetacea and Cystotheca castanopsidis.

== Taxonomy ==
The fungus was formally described in 1922 by Gäumann with the basionym Lanomyces tjibodensis. It was transferred to the genus Cystotheca by Katumoto in 1973. The type specimen was collected in Indonesia.
