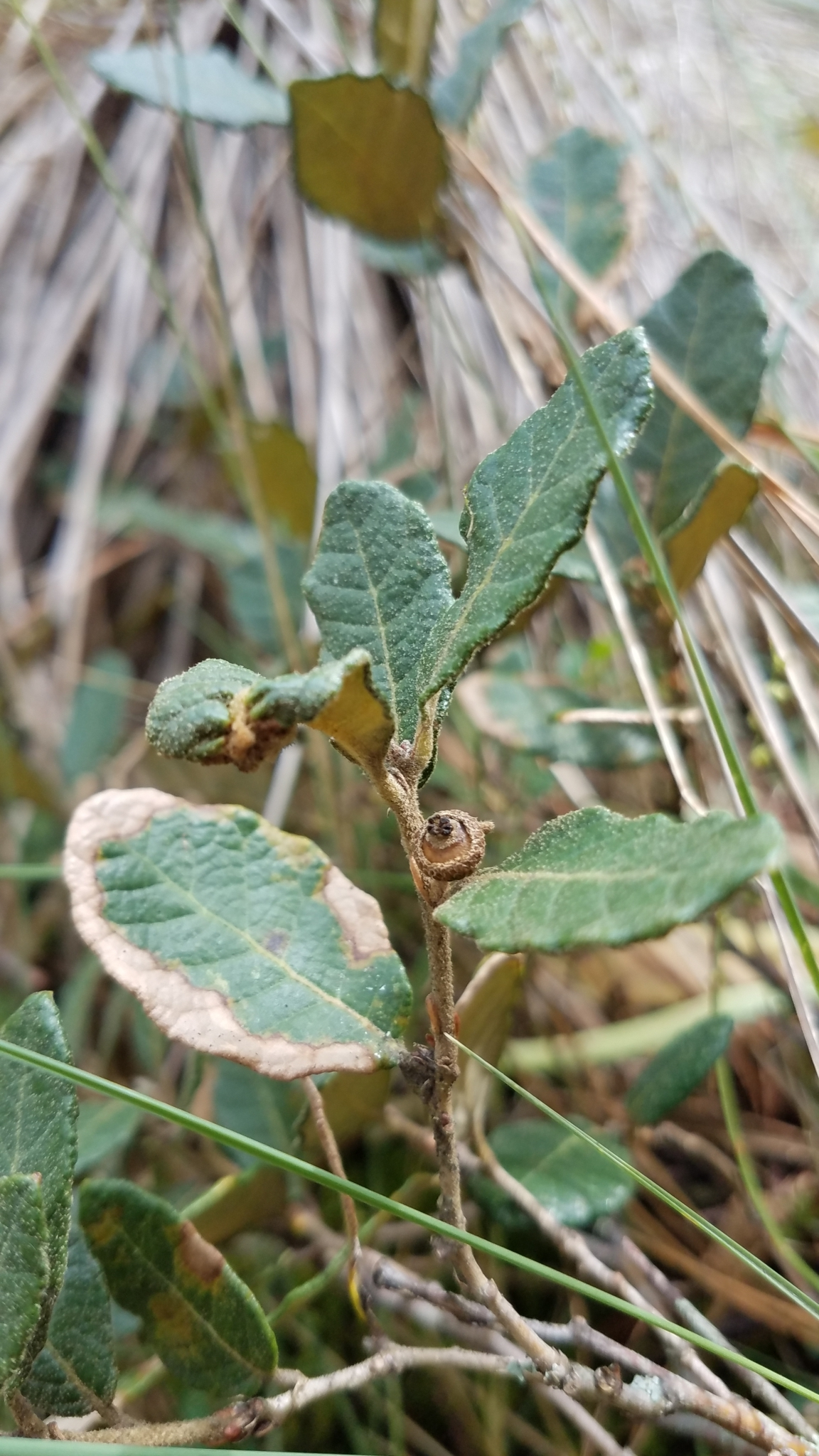

Conservation status
- Least Concern (IUCN 3.1)

Scientific classification
- Kingdom: Plantae
- Clade: Embryophytes
- Clade: Tracheophytes
- Clade: Spermatophytes
- Clade: Angiosperms
- Clade: Eudicots
- Clade: Rosids
- Order: Fagales
- Family: Fagaceae
- Genus: Quercus
- Subgenus: Quercus subg. Quercus
- Section: Quercus sect. Quercus
- Species: Q. microphylla

Binomial name
- Quercus microphylla Née

Synonyms
- List: Cerris microphyla (Née) Raf.; Quercus frutex var. uhdeana Trel.; Quercus macrocarpa Endl.; Quercus microphylla var. uhdeana (Trel.) A.Camus; Quercus repanda Benth.

= Quercus microphylla =

Species of oak tree

Quercus microphylla is a Mexican species of oak in the beech family. It is widespread from Oaxaca as far north as Chihuahua, Coahuila, and Tamaulipas.

== Description ==
Quercus microphylla is a shrub rarely more than 60 centimetres (24 inches) tall, forming dense mats several meters across. The leaves are tiny compared to most other species in the genus, usually less than 35 millimetres (1 1/2 in) long.
