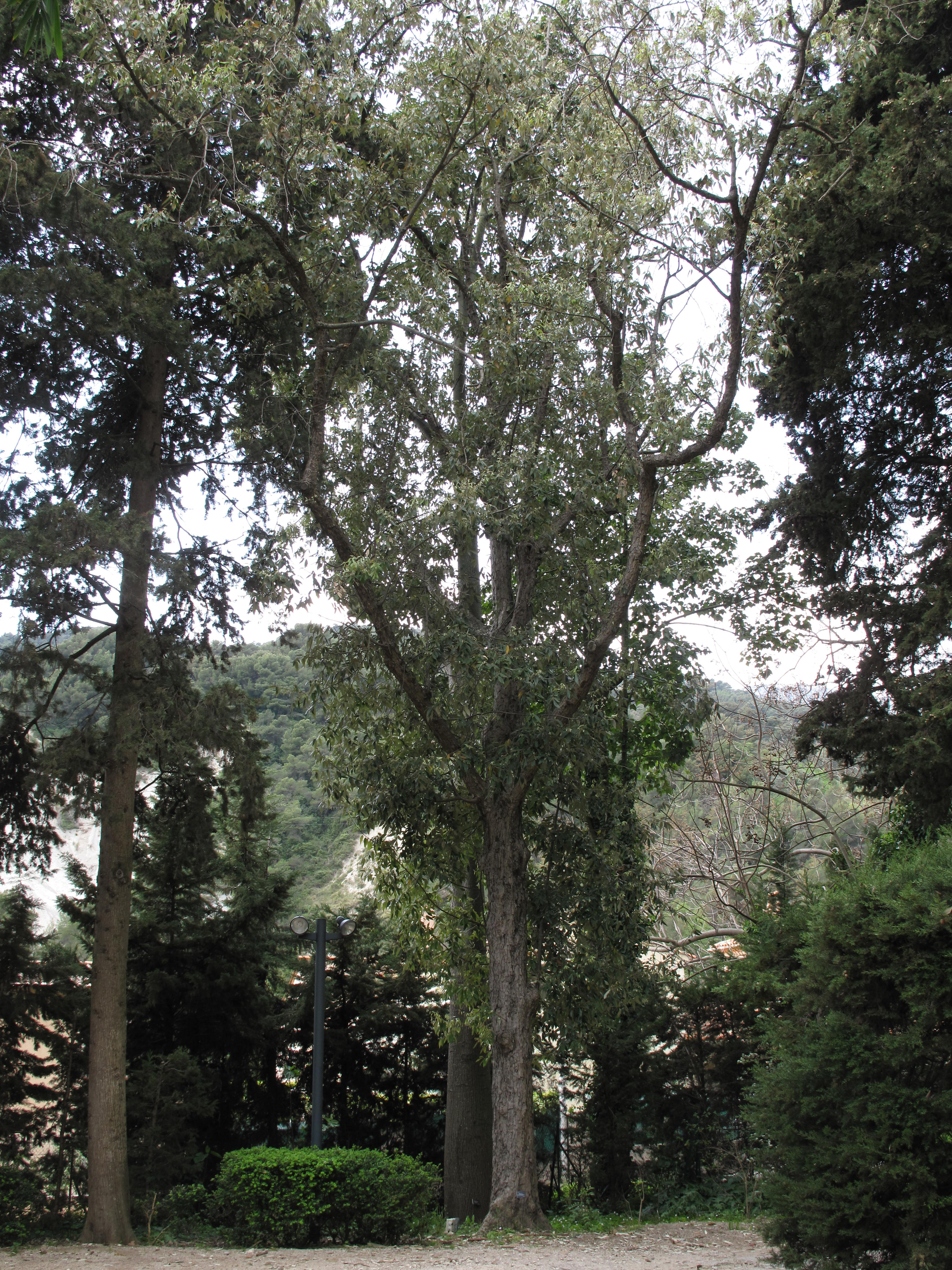

Scientific classification
- Kingdom: Plantae
- Clade: Tracheophytes
- Clade: Angiosperms
- Clade: Eudicots
- Clade: Rosids
- Order: Fagales
- Family: Fagaceae
- Genus: Quercus
- Subgenus: Quercus subg. Cerris
- Section: Quercus sect. Ilex
- Species: Q. leucotrichophora

Binomial name
- Quercus leucotrichophora A.Camus

= Quercus leucotrichophora =

Species of oak tree

Quercus leucotrichophora is a tree belonging to Family Fagaceae; commonly known as Banjh oak, Banj oak (Uttarakhand) and Ban oak (Himachal). In Nepal, it is known as Banjhi, Rainj, Khasarant, Tikhe bhanjh in standard Nepali and Sulsing in Tamang language. It is classified in subgenus Cerris, section Ilex. Some authors named it as Quercus incana Roxburgh, which is now treated as a synonym.

== Description ==
Quercus leucotrichophora is an evergreen tree bearing stalked, ovate to lanceolate, acuminate, serrate, leathery, and dark green leaves which are glabrous above and densely white or gray pubescent beneath. The male flowers are slender and drooping spikes. The female spikes are sessile and axillary. There is a solitary acorn.

Quercus leucotrichophora flowers in April to May and fruits in December. Naturally, it regenerates via seeds.

== Distribution and ecology ==
Quercus leucotrichophora is distributed in Northern India, Nepal, Myanmar, Pakistan, and Sri Lanka. In Nepal, it naturally occurs at 1,500–2,700 metres (4,900–8,900 feet) in forested areas in association with Rhododendron arboreum, Lyonia ovalifolia, and Myrica esculenta. On south-facing slopes and disturbed areas it forms associations with Pinus roxburghii (chir pine).

The fungus Lactarius abbotanus forms ectomycorrhizae with the roots of this tree.

Its branches are festooned with a variety of mosses, lichens, epiphytes, parasitic creepers, and other life forms that provide spaces for many creatures.

The tree is affected with many types of leaf galls caused by different types of insects. Many Cecidomyiidae genera such as Asphondylia, Lasioptera and Dasineura are known to cause plant galls. An unknown Itonididae (cecidomyiid) caused pouch leaf galls on the tree.

== Uses ==
The Banj oak is among the most useful trees of the Himalayas. It is extensively lopped (or branch pruned) for fuelwood and its wood has a high calorific value and good burning properties. The leaves are extensively used as a cattle fodder. The leaf litter is rich in nitrogen and makes an excellent compost fertilizer. The timber, while hard and strong and used for agricultural implements, is not particularly valuable as it is hard to work.
