= Phyllactinia angulata =

Scientific classification
- Kingdom: Fungi
- Division: Ascomycota
- Class: Leotiomycetes
- Order: Helotiales
- Family: Erysiphaceae
- Genus: Phyllactinia
- Species: P. angulata

Binomial name
- Phyllactinia angulata (E.S. Salmon) S. Blumer, (1933)

Synonyms
- List: Phyllactinia corylea var. angulata E.S. Salmon, Annls mycol. 3(6): 500 (1906); Phyllactinia suffulta var. angulata (E.S. Salmon) Sacc. & Trotter, Syll. fung. (Abellini) 22(1): 378 (1913)

Species of fungus

Phyllactinia angulata is a plant pathogen infecting chestnut, beech, oak and elm trees in North America with powdery mildew. Collections on elm were segregated into a new variety, Phyllactinia angulata var. ulmi.

Reports of this species infecting pistachio are probably instead referrable to Phyllactinia pistaciae, described in 2003.
