= Quercus hypargyrea =

Conservation status
- Near Threatened (IUCN 3.1)

Scientific classification
- Kingdom: Plantae
- Clade: Embryophytes
- Clade: Tracheophytes
- Clade: Spermatophytes
- Clade: Angiosperms
- Clade: Eudicots
- Clade: Rosids
- Order: Fagales
- Family: Fagaceae
- Genus: Quercus
- Subgenus: Quercus subg. Cerris
- Section: Quercus sect. Cyclobalanopsis
- Species: Q. hypargyrea

Binomial name
- Quercus hypargyrea (Seemen) C.C.Huang & Y.T.Chang

Synonyms
- Cyclobalanopsis hypargyrea (Seemen ex Diels) Y.C.Hsu & H.Wei Jen; Cyclobalanopsis multinervis W.C.Cheng & T.Hong; Quercus glauca var. hypargyrea Seemen ex Diels; Quercus multinervis (W.C.Cheng & T.Hong) Govaerts, nom. illeg., non Lesq. (1859); Quercus stenophylla var. hypargyrea (Seemen ex Diels) A.Camus

Species of tree

Quercus hypargyrea is an Asian species of tree in the beech family Fagaceae. It is native to south-central and southeast China, in particular the provinces of Anhui, Fujian, Guangxi, Hubei, Hunan, Jiangxi, Shaanxi, and Sichuan. It has incorrectly been known as Quercus multinervis, which is properly the name of a fossil species. It is placed in subgenus Cerris, section Cyclobalanopsis.

Quercus hypargyrea is a tree up to 12 m tall. Leaves can be as much as 15.5 cm long.

== Taxonomy ==
Quercus hypargyrea was first described as Quercus glauca var. hypargyrea in 1900 by Ludwig Diels, who attributed the name to Karl Otto von Seemen. It was raised to a full species in 1992. Independently, the species was described as Cyclobalanopsis multinervis in 1963. In 1998, this was transferred to Quercus as "Quercus multinervis". However, this name had already been published in 1859 for a fossil species, so is illegitimate.

It is placed in subgenus Cerris, section Cyclobalanopsis.
