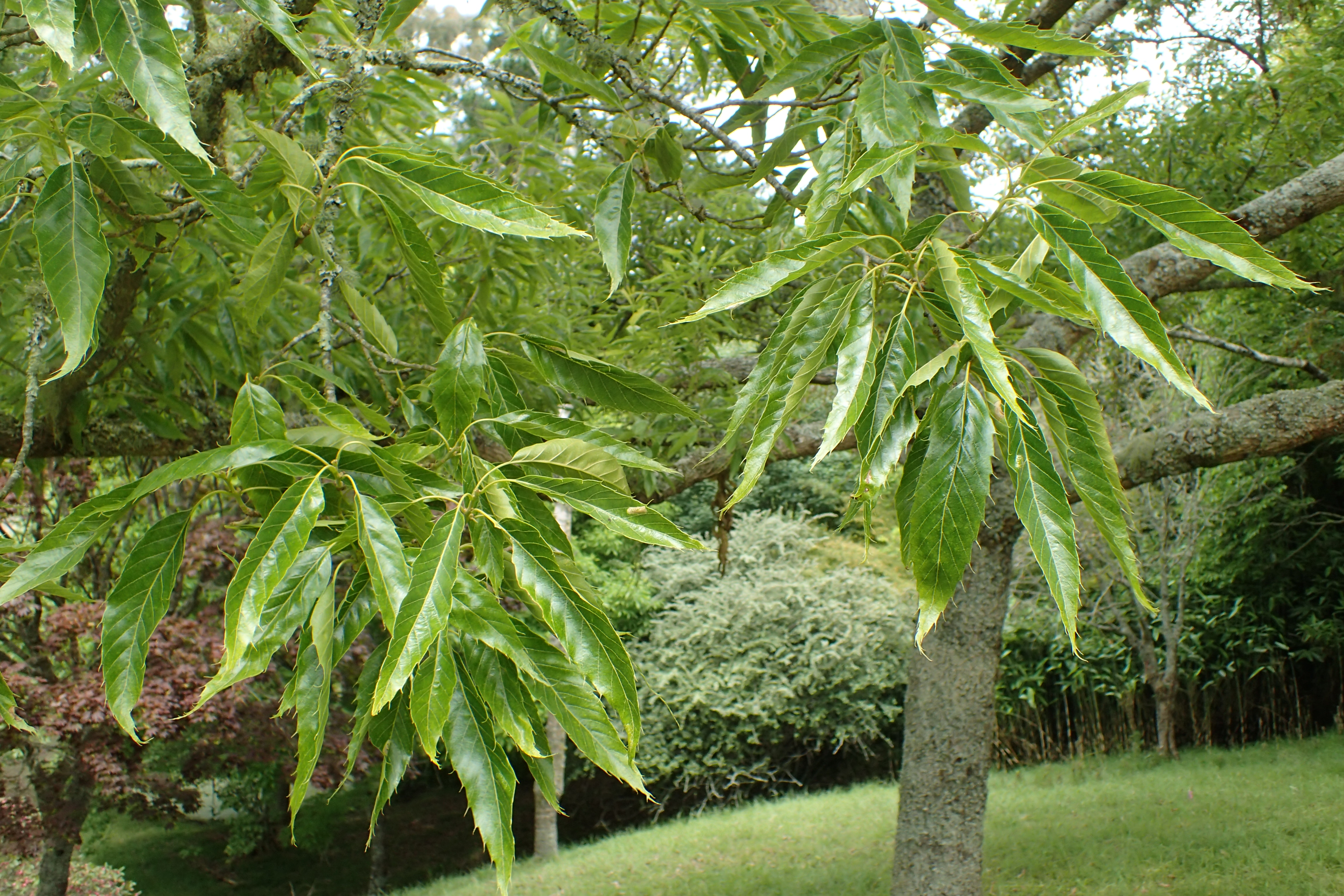

Conservation status
- Near Threatened (IUCN 3.1)

Scientific classification
- Kingdom: Plantae
- Clade: Embryophytes
- Clade: Tracheophytes
- Clade: Spermatophytes
- Clade: Angiosperms
- Clade: Eudicots
- Clade: Rosids
- Order: Fagales
- Family: Fagaceae
- Genus: Quercus
- Subgenus: Quercus subg. Cerris
- Section: Quercus sect. Cerris
- Species: Q. chenii

Binomial name
- Quercus chenii Nakai

= Quercus chenii =

Species of tree

Quercus chenii is a species of live oak native to southeast China. It is in subgenus Cerris, section Cerris. A tree reaching 30 metres (98 feet) in height, it grows from sea level to about 600 m (2,000 ft) in elevation, and can form pure stands. Some authorities feel that it could be a synonym of Quercus acutissima.
