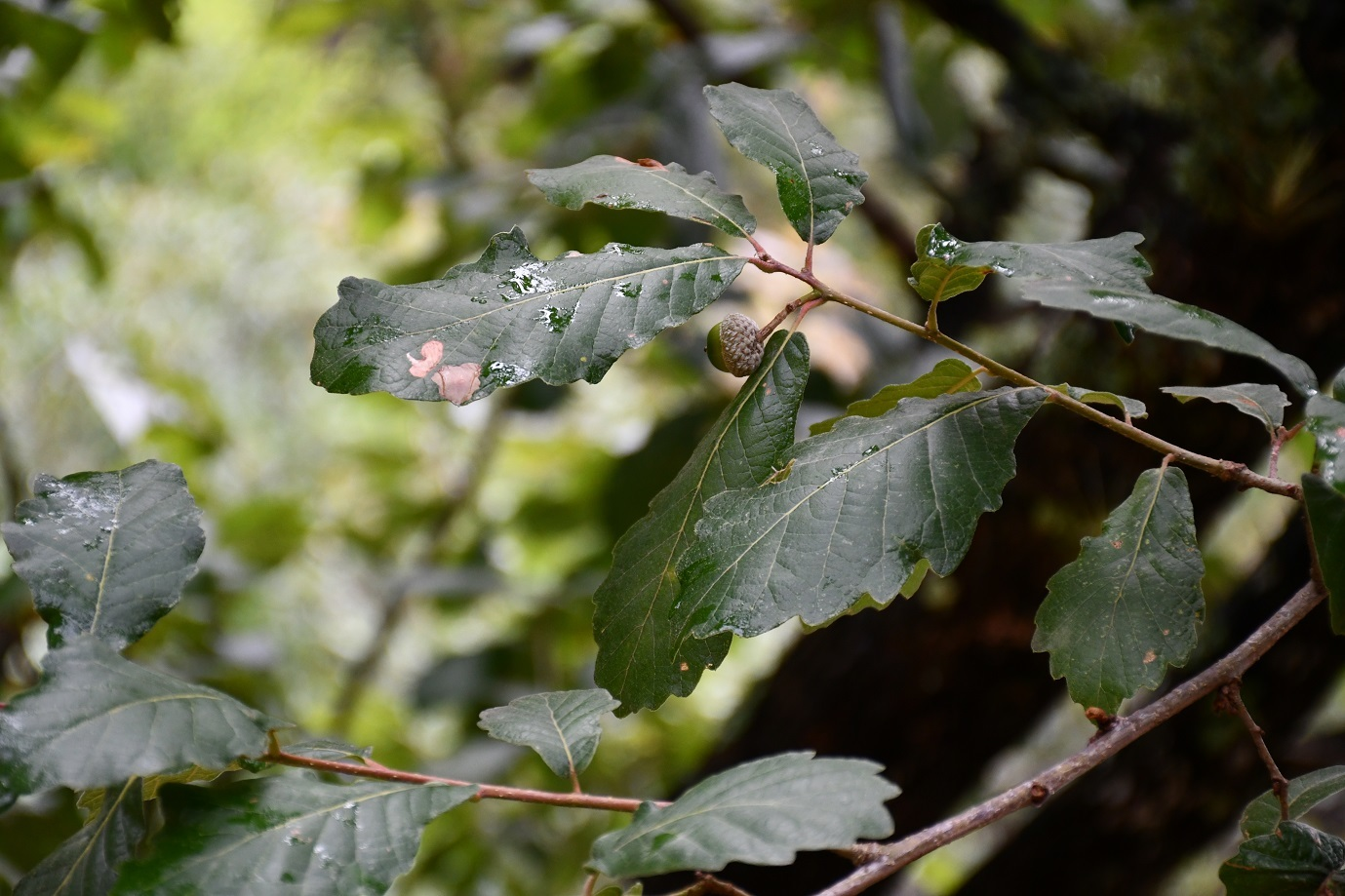

Conservation status
- Least Concern (IUCN 3.1)

Scientific classification
- Kingdom: Plantae
- Clade: Tracheophytes
- Clade: Angiosperms
- Clade: Eudicots
- Clade: Rosids
- Order: Fagales
- Family: Fagaceae
- Genus: Quercus
- Subgenus: Quercus subg. Quercus
- Section: Quercus sect. Quercus
- Species: Q. liebmannii

Binomial name
- Quercus liebmannii Oersted ex Trel.

Synonyms
- Quercus liebmannii Oerst., name published without description; Quercus liebmannii f. brevipes Trel.; Quercus poculifer Trel.

= Quercus liebmannii =

Species of oak tree

Quercus liebmannii is a Mexican species of trees in the beech family. It has been found only in the States of Oaxaca and Puebla.
