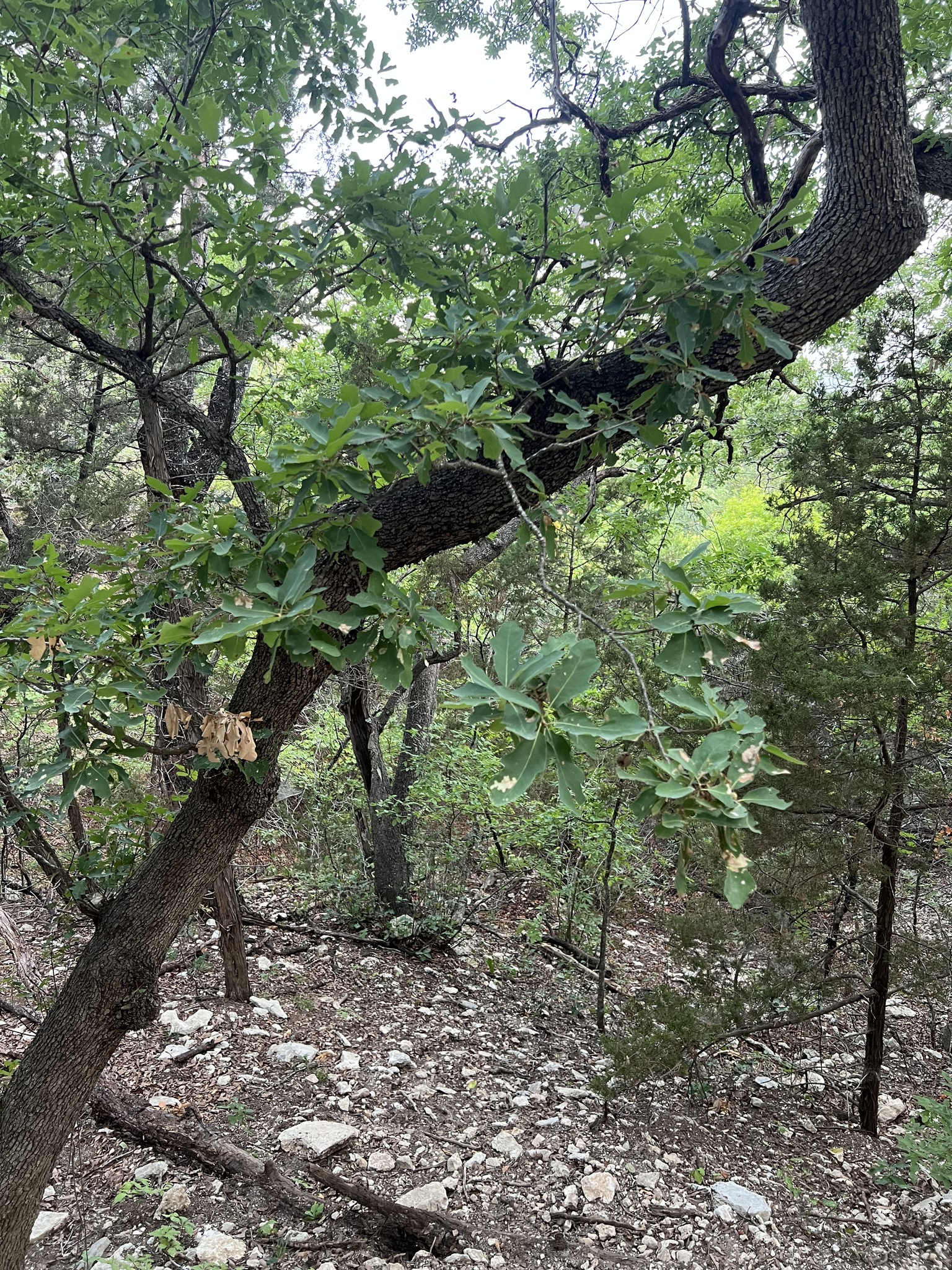

Conservation status
- Least Concern (IUCN 3.1)

- Apparently Secure (NatureServe)

Scientific classification
- Kingdom: Plantae
- Clade: Embryophytes
- Clade: Tracheophytes
- Clade: Spermatophytes
- Clade: Angiosperms
- Clade: Eudicots
- Clade: Rosids
- Order: Fagales
- Family: Fagaceae
- Genus: Quercus
- Subgenus: Quercus subg. Quercus
- Section: Quercus sect. Quercus
- Species: Q. laceyi

Binomial name
- Quercus laceyi Small
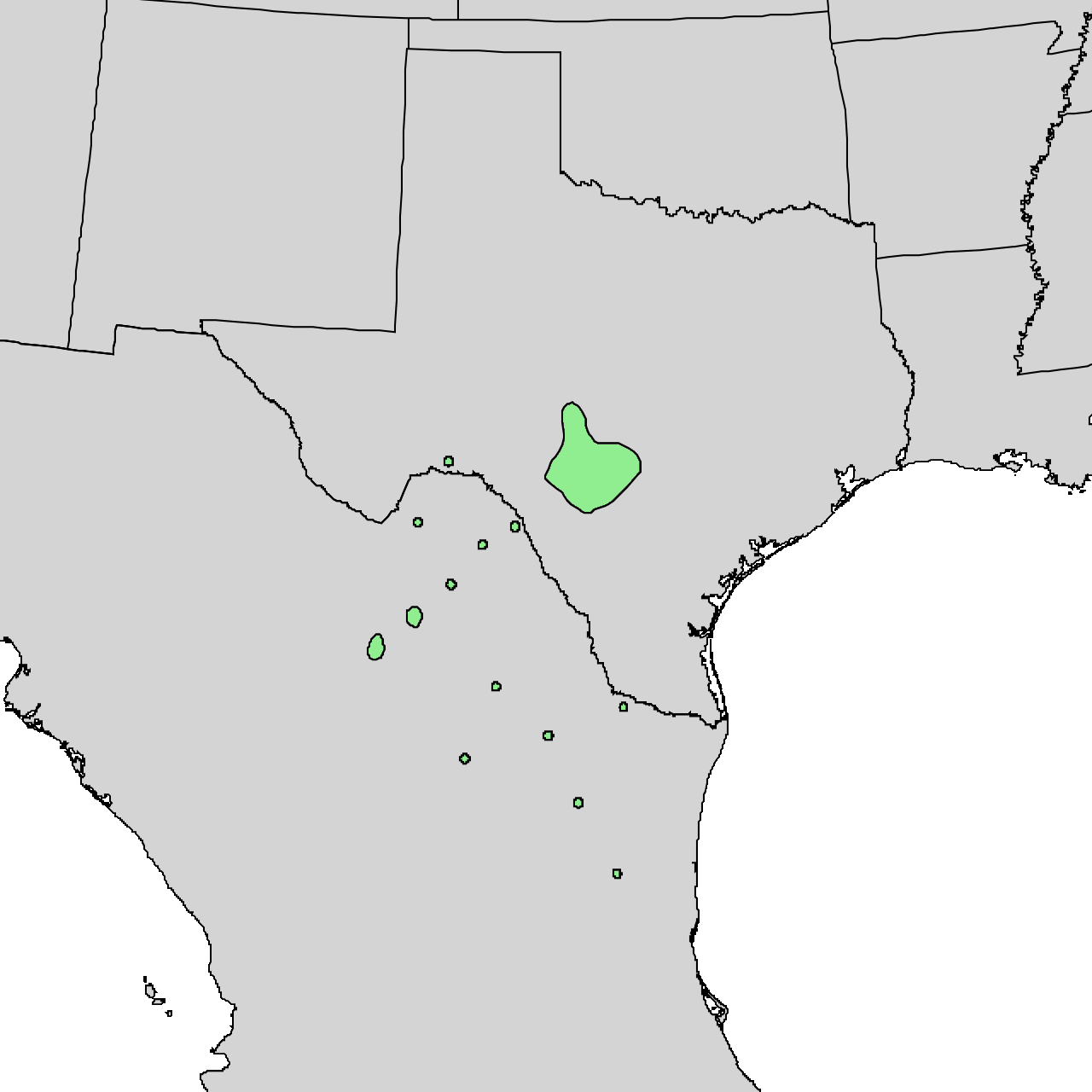
- Natural range of Quercus laceyi

Synonyms
- Quercus breviloba f. laceyi (Small) Trel.; Quercus breviloba subsp. laceyi (Small) A.Camus

= Quercus laceyi =

Lacey oak

Species of oak tree

Quercus laceyi, the Lacey oak, is a small to medium-size deciduous oak tree which is native to northeastern Mexico (Coahuila and Nuevo León) and to the Texas Hill Country in central Texas in the United States.

== Description ==
Quercus laceyi seldom grows more than 35 feet (11 meters) tall, and has a stocky trunk. Its blue-green leaves are oblong and shallowly lobed to unlobed, but shade leaves can be deeply lobed; they most often turn yellow or brown in autumn. Autumn colors can be attractive but tend to run late by comparison with when walnuts, sycamores and maples provide them.

Quercus laceyi has often been confused with Quercus glaucoides, which is an evergreen oak native to central and southern Mexico.

== Habitat ==
Quercus laceyi is often found in association with limestone outcrops.
