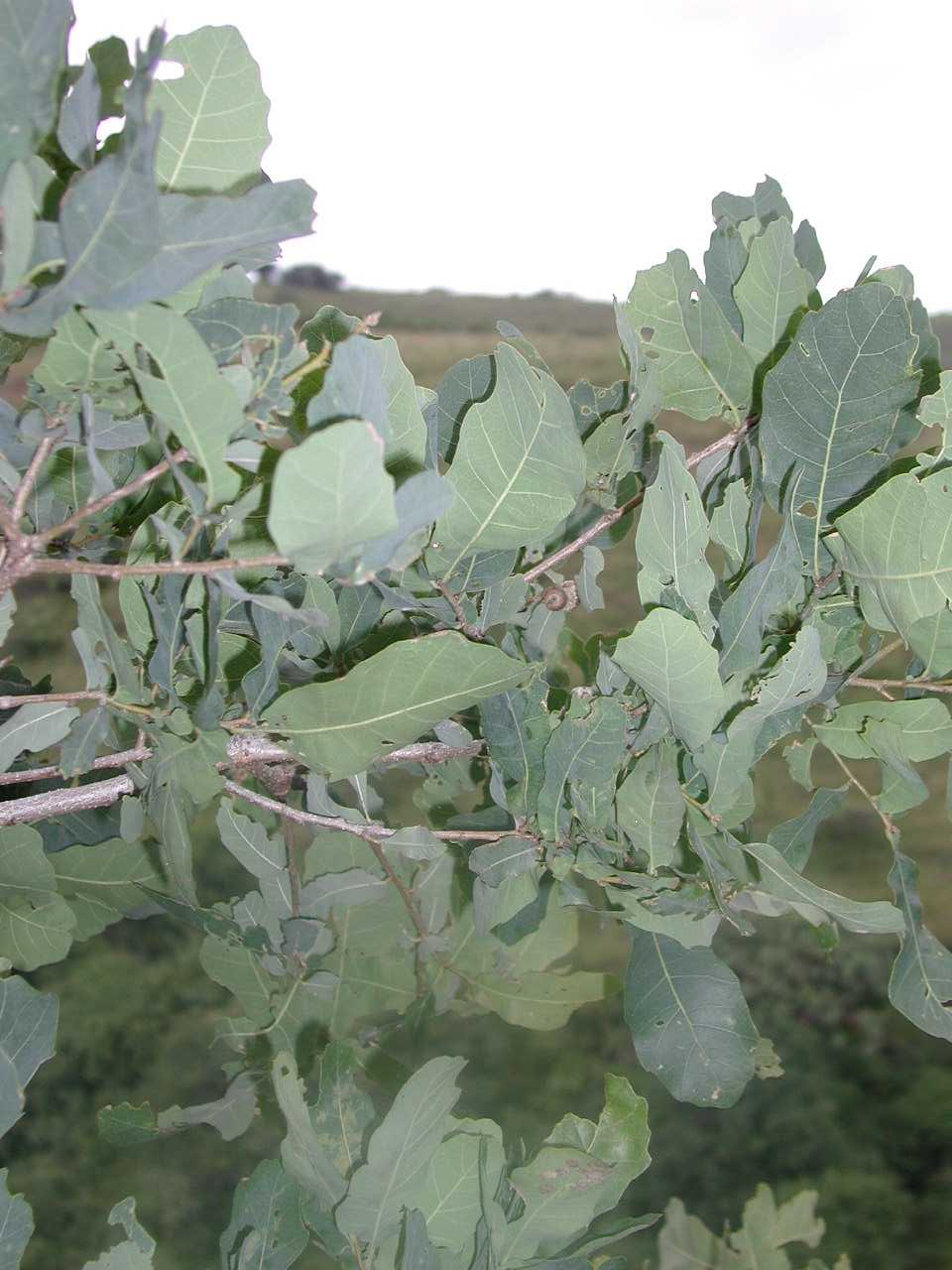

Conservation status
- Least Concern (IUCN 3.1)

Scientific classification
- Kingdom: Plantae
- Clade: Embryophytes
- Clade: Tracheophytes
- Clade: Spermatophytes
- Clade: Angiosperms
- Clade: Eudicots
- Clade: Rosids
- Order: Fagales
- Family: Fagaceae
- Genus: Quercus
- Subgenus: Quercus subg. Quercus
- Section: Quercus sect. Quercus
- Species: Q. glaucoides

Binomial name
- Quercus glaucoides M.Martens & Galeotti

Synonyms
- List: Quercus baldoquinae Trel.; Quercus cancellata Trel.; Quercus conjugens Trel.; Quercus cordata M.Martens & Galeotti; Quercus glaucophylla Seemen ex Loes.; Quercus glaucophylla f. lobata C.H.Mull.; Quercus glaucophylla f. longifolia C.H.Mull.; Quercus glaucophylla f. macropetiolata C.H.Mull.; Quercus glaucophylla var. subrotundifolia C.H.Mull.; Quercus glaucophylla f. tlacolulana Trel.; Quercus harmsiana Trel.; Quercus mixtecana Trel.

= Quercus glaucoides =

Species of oak tree

Quercus glaucoides is an oak species in the white oak section, Quercus section Quercus, found in and endemic to eastern, central and southern Mexico (Guanajuato, Guerrero, México State, Hidalgo, Jalisco, Michoacán, Oaxaca, Puebla).

== Description ==
Quercus glaucoides is primarily a canopy tree in its native habitat. It is an evergreen tree up to 10 metres (33 feet) tall with a trunk diameter of over 40 centimetres (16 inches). The leaves are thick and leathery, up to 15 cm (6 in) long, with a few shallow rounded lobes.

Its scientific name is often misapplied to the NE Mexican and central Texas native Lacey oak (Quercus laceyi), which has caused great confusion about the true identity of this species and the correct scientific name for the Lacey oak. Although somewhat related, they do not share the same native range, with Q. glaucoides being endemic to Mexico, while Q. laceyi is native to both northeast Mexico and central Texas, and Q. glaucoides is evergreen, while Q. laceyi is deciduous.
