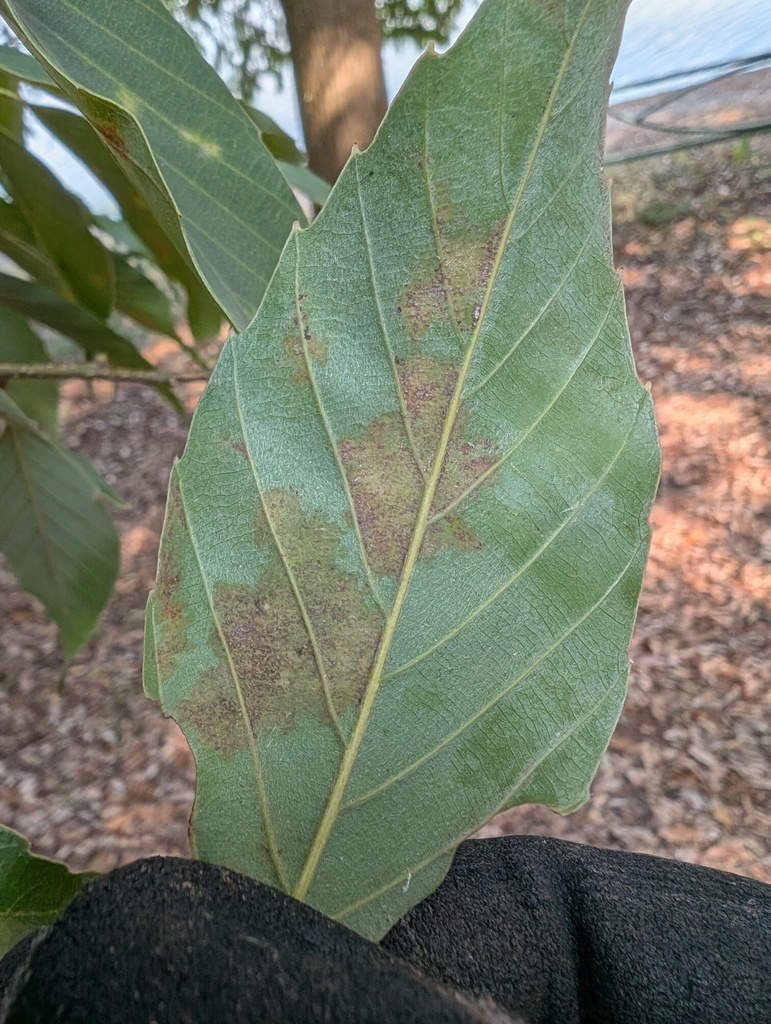

Scientific classification
- Kingdom: Fungi
- Division: Ascomycota
- Class: Leotiomycetes
- Order: Helotiales
- Family: Erysiphaceae
- Genus: Cystotheca
- Species: C. wrightii

Binomial name
- Cystotheca wrightii Berk. & M.A. Curtis, 1858

= Cystotheca wrightii =

Species of fungus

Cystotheca wrightii is a species of powdery mildew in the family Erysiphaceae. It is found in Asia on species of Quercus subg. Cerris sect. Cyclobalanopsis.

== Description ==
The fungus likely forms dense distorting patches on the leaves of its host, with brown mycelium on the leaf undersides. Cystotheca wrightii, like most Erysiphaceae, is highly host-specific and only infects species in the genus Quercus. All currently available sequences of C. wrightii (from China, Japan, and Korea) have been retrieved from Q. glauca as host.

== Taxonomy ==
The fungus was formally described in 1858 by Berkeley and M.A. Curtis. C. wrightii is the type species for the genus Cystotheca. As well as Quercus subg. Cerris sect. Cyclobalanopsis, C. wrightii has also been reported from Quercus subg. Quercus sect. Quercus, and Castanopsis, although both records are doubtful.
