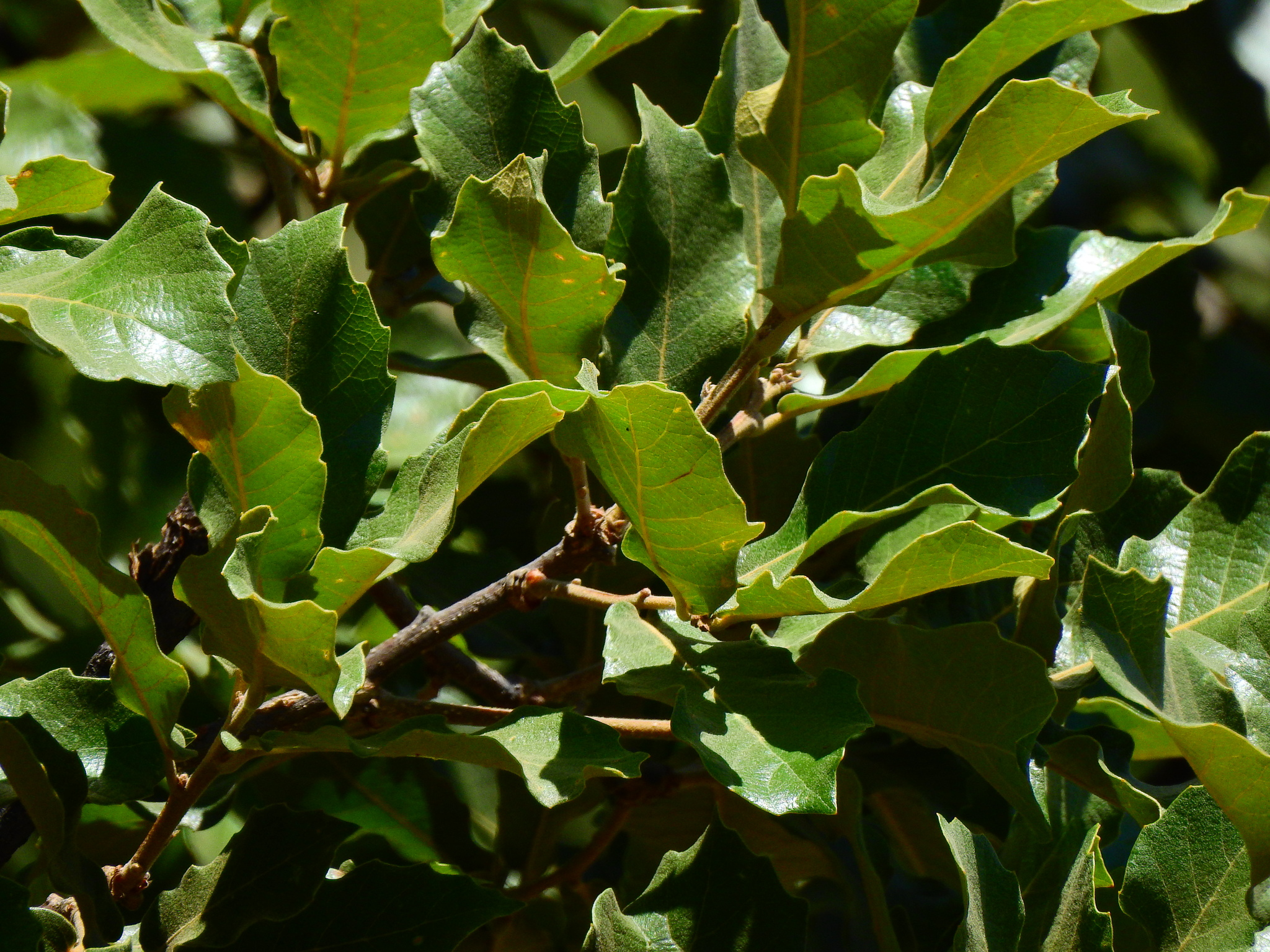

Conservation status
- Least Concern (IUCN 3.1)

Scientific classification
- Kingdom: Plantae
- Clade: Embryophytes
- Clade: Tracheophytes
- Clade: Spermatophytes
- Clade: Angiosperms
- Clade: Eudicots
- Clade: Rosids
- Order: Fagales
- Family: Fagaceae
- Genus: Quercus
- Subgenus: Quercus subg. Quercus
- Section: Quercus sect. Quercus
- Species: Q. potosina

Binomial name
- Quercus potosina Trel.

Synonyms
- List: Quercus jaralensis Trel.; Quercus jaralensis f. berlandieri Trel.; Quercus potosina f. aperta Trel.; Quercus potosina f. exilis Trel.

= Quercus potosina =

Species of oak tree

Quercus potosina is a species of oak. It is native to northern Mexico, from Chihuahua, Durango, and Jalisco east as far as San Luis Potosí. It is placed in Quercus section Quercus.

== Description ==
Quercus potosina is a shrub or small tree up to 7 metres (23 feet) tall, and is drought-deciduous. The leaves are round or egg-shaped, up to 9 centimetres (3 1/2 inches) long, with numerous small pointed teeth along the edges.
