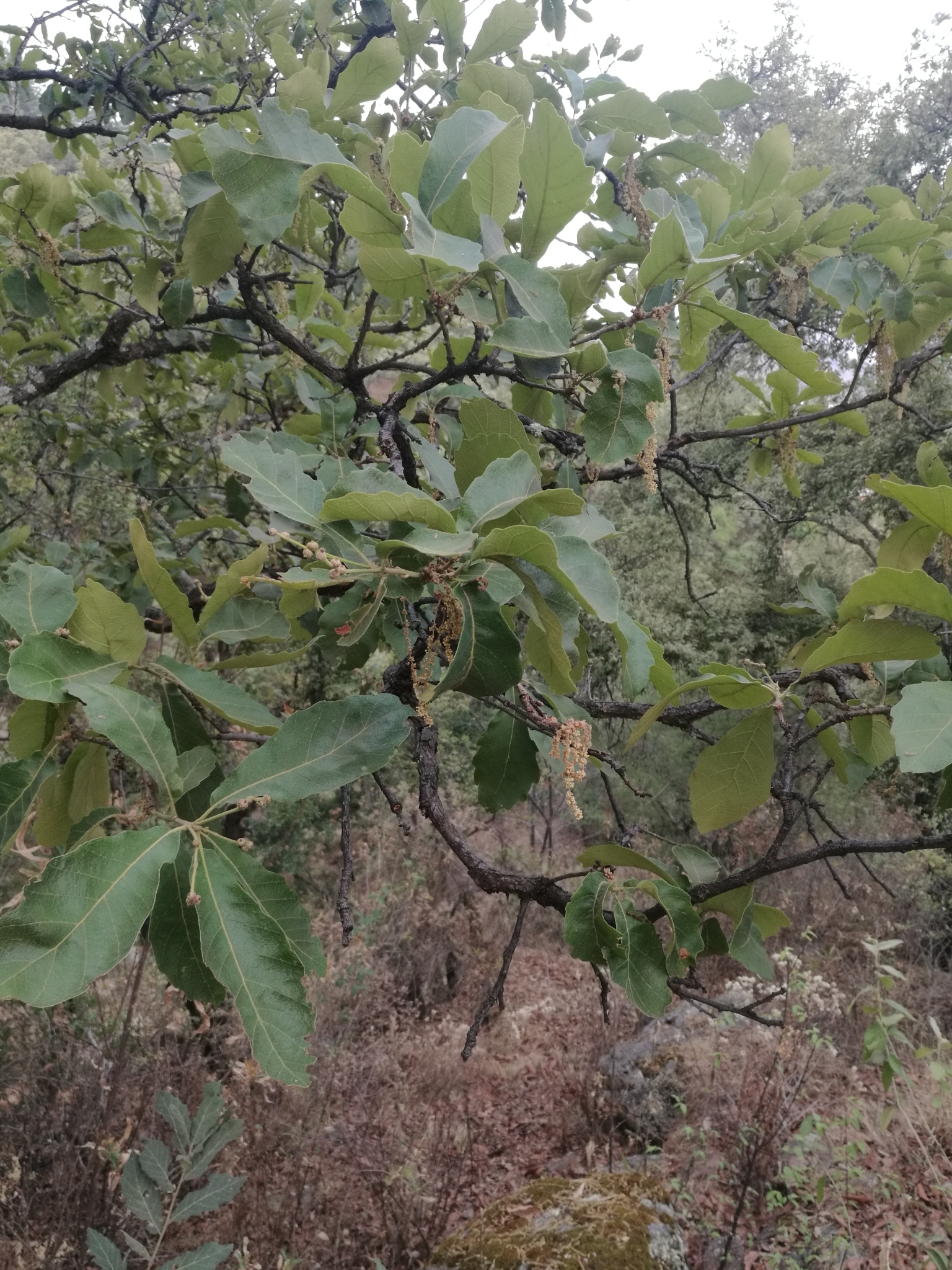

Conservation status
- Least Concern (IUCN 3.1)

Scientific classification
- Kingdom: Plantae
- Clade: Embryophytes
- Clade: Tracheophytes
- Clade: Spermatophytes
- Clade: Angiosperms
- Clade: Eudicots
- Clade: Rosids
- Order: Fagales
- Family: Fagaceae
- Genus: Quercus
- Subgenus: Quercus subg. Quercus
- Section: Quercus sect. Quercus
- Species: Q. laeta

Binomial name
- Quercus laeta Liebm.

Synonyms
- List: Quercus centralis Trel.; Quercus clivicola Trel. & C.H.Müll.; Quercus obscura Trel.; Quercus pallescens Trel.; Quercus prinopsis Trel.; Quercus transmontana Trel.

= Quercus laeta =

Species of oak tree

Quercus laeta is an oak species in the white oak section, Quercus section Quercus, in the beech family. It is widespread across much of Mexico from Sinaloa and Nuevo León south as far as Oaxaca.

== Description ==
Quercus laeta is a tree up to 10 metres (33 feet) tall with a trunk up to 40 centimetres (16 inches) in diameter. The leaves are dark green, thick and leathery, up to 40 cm long with a few shallow teeth along the edges.
