= Quercus toumeyi =

Conservation status
- Data Deficient (IUCN 3.1)

Scientific classification
- Kingdom: Plantae
- Clade: Embryophytes
- Clade: Tracheophytes
- Clade: Spermatophytes
- Clade: Angiosperms
- Clade: Eudicots
- Clade: Rosids
- Order: Fagales
- Family: Fagaceae
- Genus: Quercus
- Subgenus: Quercus subg. Quercus
- Section: Quercus sect. Quercus
- Species: Q. toumeyi

Binomial name
- Quercus toumeyi Sarg.
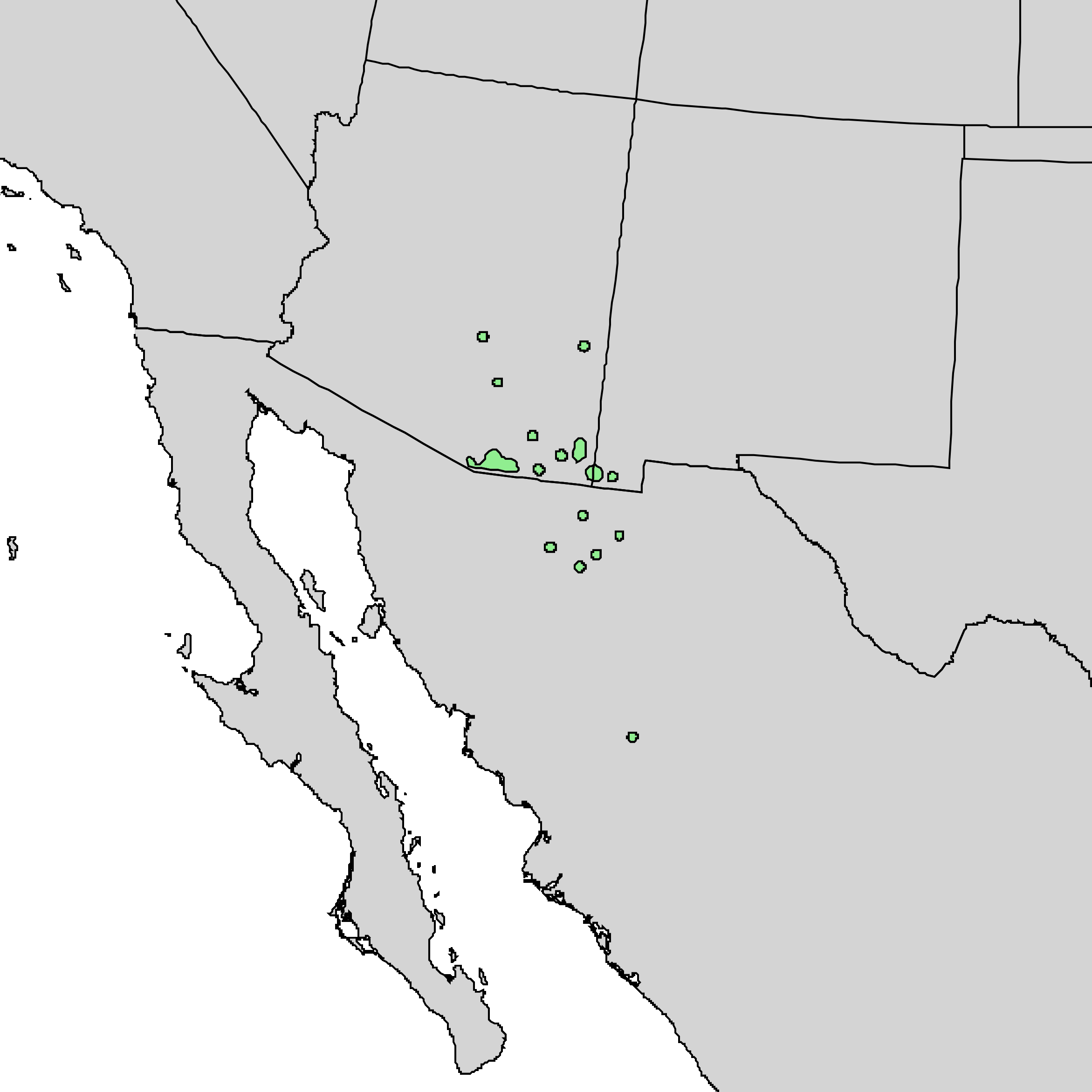
- Natural range of Quercus toumeyi

Synonyms
- Quercus chuhuichupensis C.H.Mull.; Quercus hartmanii Trel.

Species of tree

Quercus toumeyi, the Toumey oak, is a North American species of tree in the beech family. It is found in northwestern Mexico and the southwestern United States. It grows in Sonora, Chihuahua, Arizona, New Mexico, and the extreme westernmost tip of Texas (Franklin Mountains north of El Paso).

Quercus toumeyi is a deciduous or subevergreen shrub or small tree. The bark is dark gray, almost black. The leaves are tiny for the genus, rarely more than 3 centimetres (1 1/4 inches) long, green and shiny on the top, and dull gray on the underside.
