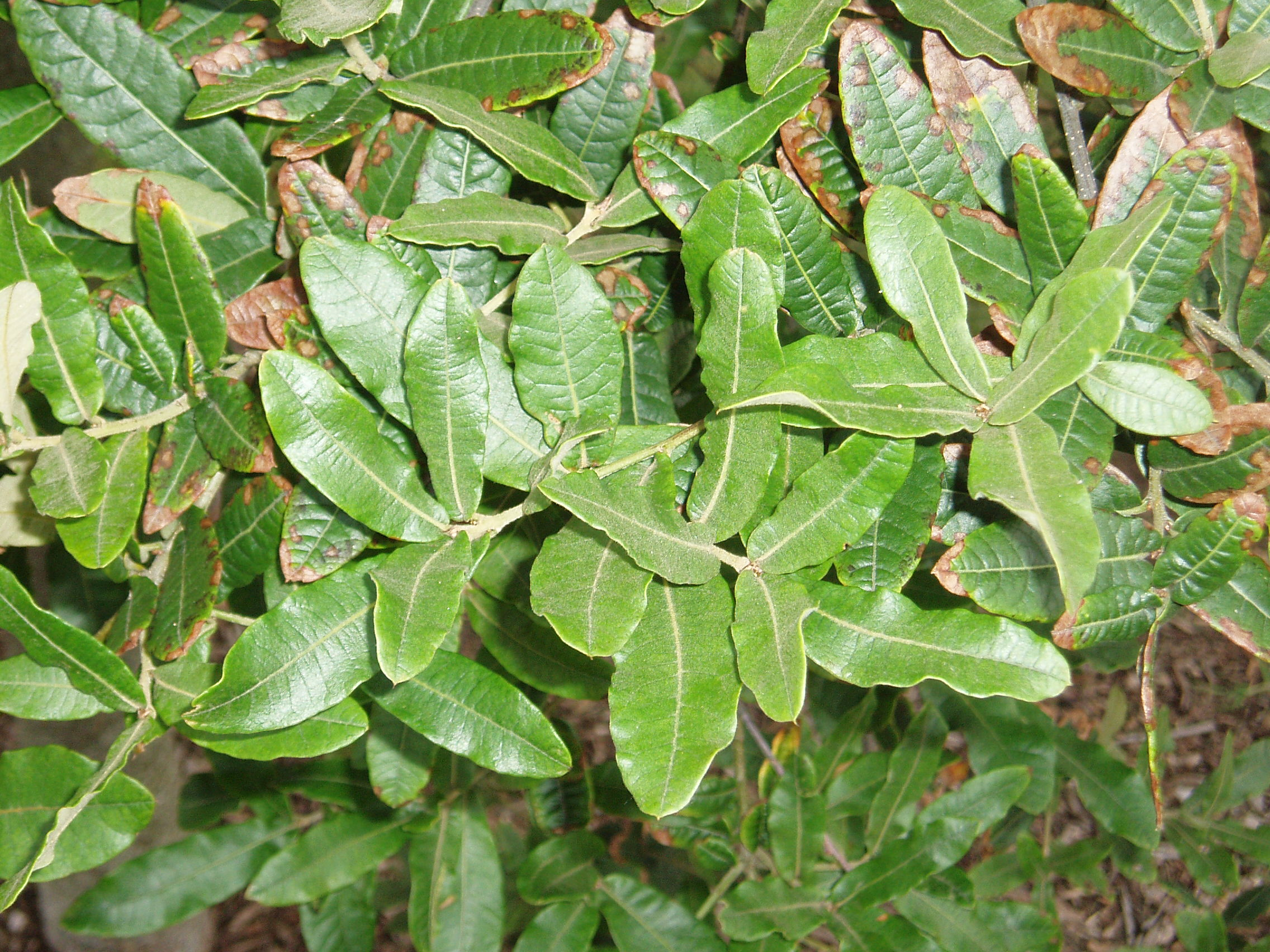

Conservation status
- Least Concern (IUCN 3.1)

Scientific classification
- Kingdom: Plantae
- Clade: Embryophytes
- Clade: Tracheophytes
- Clade: Spermatophytes
- Clade: Angiosperms
- Clade: Eudicots
- Clade: Rosids
- Order: Fagales
- Family: Fagaceae
- Genus: Quercus
- Subgenus: Quercus subg. Quercus
- Section: Quercus sect. Lobatae
- Species: Q. crassipes

Binomial name
- Quercus crassipes Bonpl.

Synonyms
- List: Quercus castanea var. glabrata (Liebm. ex Seem.) A.DC.; Quercus colimae Trel.; Quercus colimae f. zauzillo Trel.; Quercus confertifolia Bonpl.; Quercus crassipes var. angustifolia Bonpl.; Quercus cuajimalpana Trel.; Quercus imbricariifolia Trel.; Quercus mexicana Benth.; Quercus mexicana f. angustifolia (Bonpl.) Trel.; Quercus mexicana var. confertifolia (Bonpl.) Wenz.; Quercus mexicana f. confertifolia (Bonpl.) Trel.; Quercus mexicana f. glabrata (Liebm. ex Seem.) Trel.; Quercus mexicana var. glabrata Liebm. ex Seem.; Quercus obovalifolia E.Fourn. ex Trel.

= Quercus crassipes =

Species of oak tree

Quercus crassipes is a species of oak tree. It is widespread across much of Mexico from Sonora and Hidalgo south to Chiapas.

It is a tree up to 17 metres (56 feet) tall with a trunk as much as 100 centimetres (39 inches) in diameter. The leaves are thick and leathery, up to 10.8 centimetres (4 1/4 in) long, elliptical with wavy edges no teeth or lobes.
