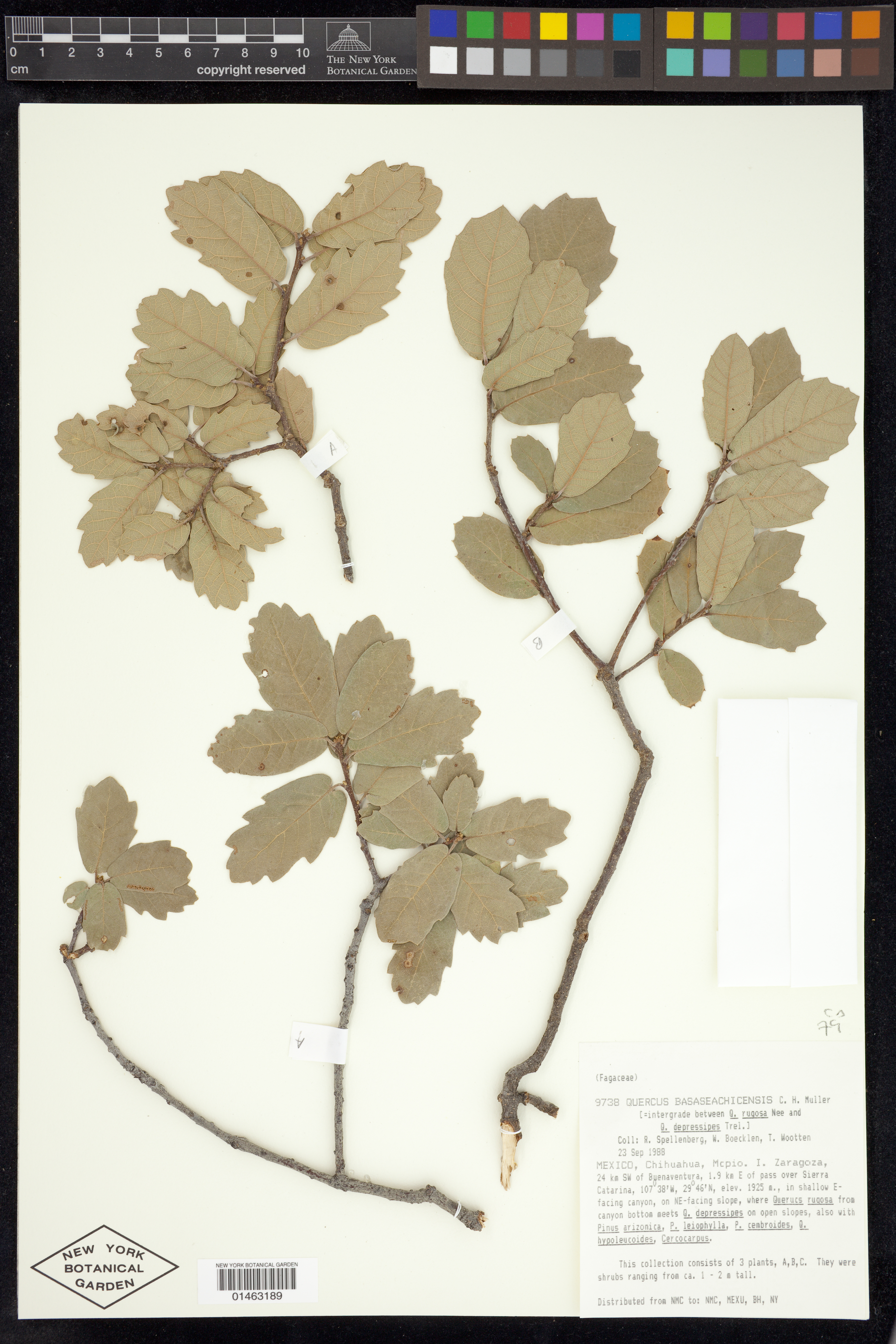

Conservation status
- Endangered (IUCN 2.3)

Scientific classification
- Kingdom: Plantae
- Clade: Tracheophytes
- Clade: Angiosperms
- Clade: Eudicots
- Clade: Rosids
- Order: Fagales
- Family: Fagaceae
- Genus: Quercus
- Subgenus: Quercus subg. Quercus
- Section: Quercus sect. Quercus
- Species: Q. × basaseachicensis

Binomial name
- Quercus × basaseachicensis C.H.Mull.

= Quercus × basaseachicensis =

Hybrid species of oak tree

Quercus × basaseachicensis is a species of oak tree in the Fagaceae (beech) family. It is thought to be a hybrid of Quercus depressipes and Quercus rugosa. It is native to the states of Chihuahua and Durango in Mexico, in which there are five known populations (all of which are believed to be small). Both parents are placed in section Quercus.
