= Quercus supranitida =

Conservation status
- Data Deficient (IUCN 3.1)

Scientific classification
- Kingdom: Plantae
- Clade: Embryophytes
- Clade: Tracheophytes
- Clade: Spermatophytes
- Clade: Angiosperms
- Clade: Eudicots
- Clade: Rosids
- Order: Fagales
- Family: Fagaceae
- Genus: Quercus
- Subgenus: Quercus subg. Quercus
- Section: Quercus sect. Quercus
- Species: Q. supranitida

Binomial name
- Quercus supranitida C.H.Mull.

Synonyms
- Quercus revoluta f. acuta C.H.Mull.

Species of flowering plant

Quercus supranitida is a species of oak. It is a tree endemic to the state of Nuevo León in northeastern Mexico. It grows in montane forest in the Sierra Madre Oriental. The species has a restricted range, and little is known about its population and habitat. The IUCN Red List assesses the species as Data Deficient.

The species was described by Cornelius Herman Muller in 1942.
