= Carpinteria Creek =

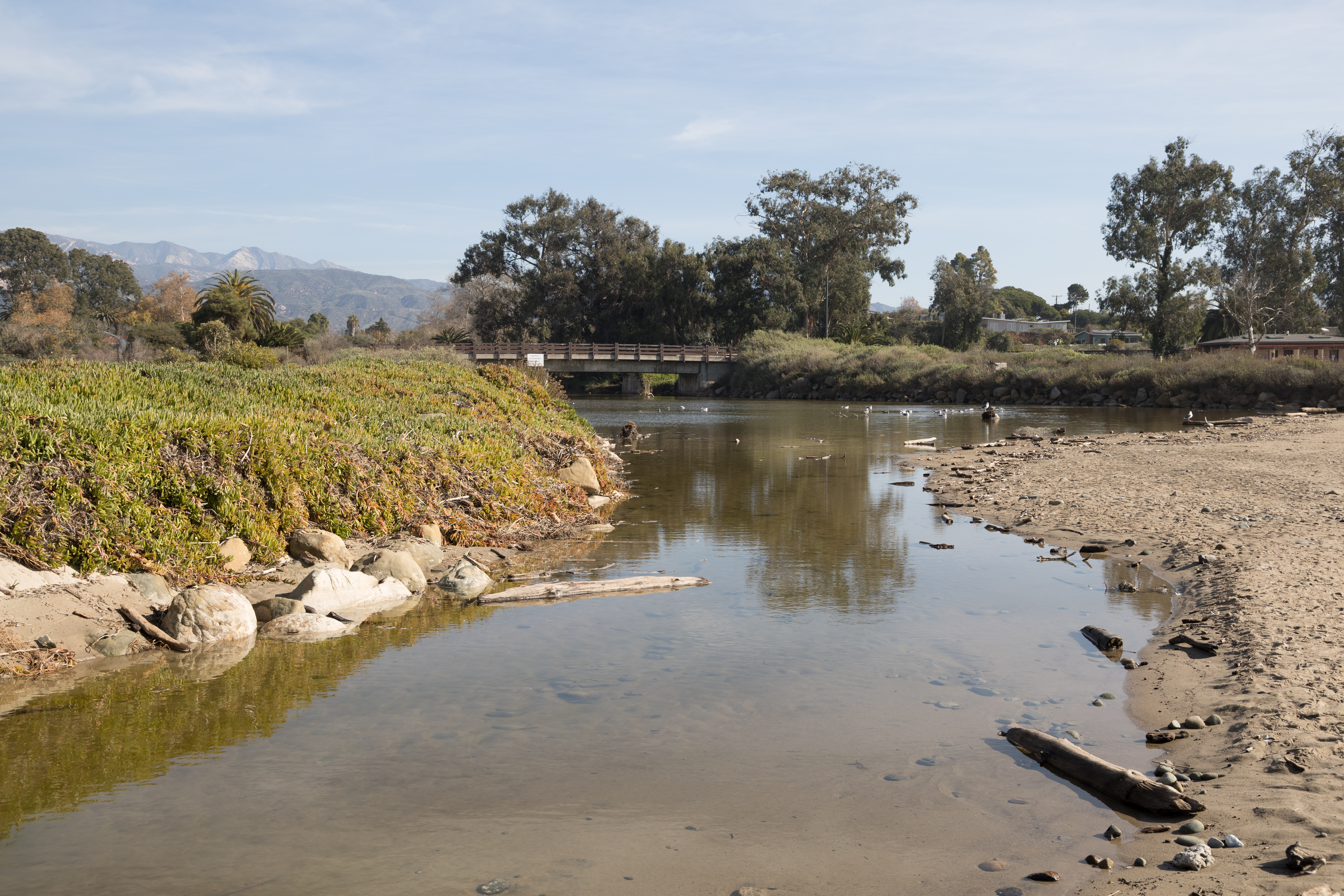

Location
- Country: United States
- State: California
- Region: Santa Barbara County
- City: Carpinteria

Physical characteristics
- Source
  - location: Santa Ynez Mountains, Los Padres National Forest
  - coordinates: 34°27′48″N 119°29′56″W
  - elevation: 3,460 ft (1,050 m)
- Mouth: Santa Barbara Channel, Pacific Ocean
  - location: Carpinteria, California
  - coordinates: 34°23′25″N 119°31′13″W
  - elevation: 0 ft (0 m)

Basin features
- Tributaries
  - left: Gobernador Creek
  - right: Sutton Canyon Creek

Carpinteria Creek is an 8.1-mile-long (13.0 km) stream that runs from headwaters in the Santa Ynez Mountains, flows south past Snowball Mountain, then continues southwest to its estuary at Carpinteria State Beach on the Santa Barbara Channel at Carpinteria.

== History ==
The Portola Expedition of 1769 found a Chumash Indian village building canoes so named the area La Carpinteria for "carpenter's shop".

== Watershed and course ==
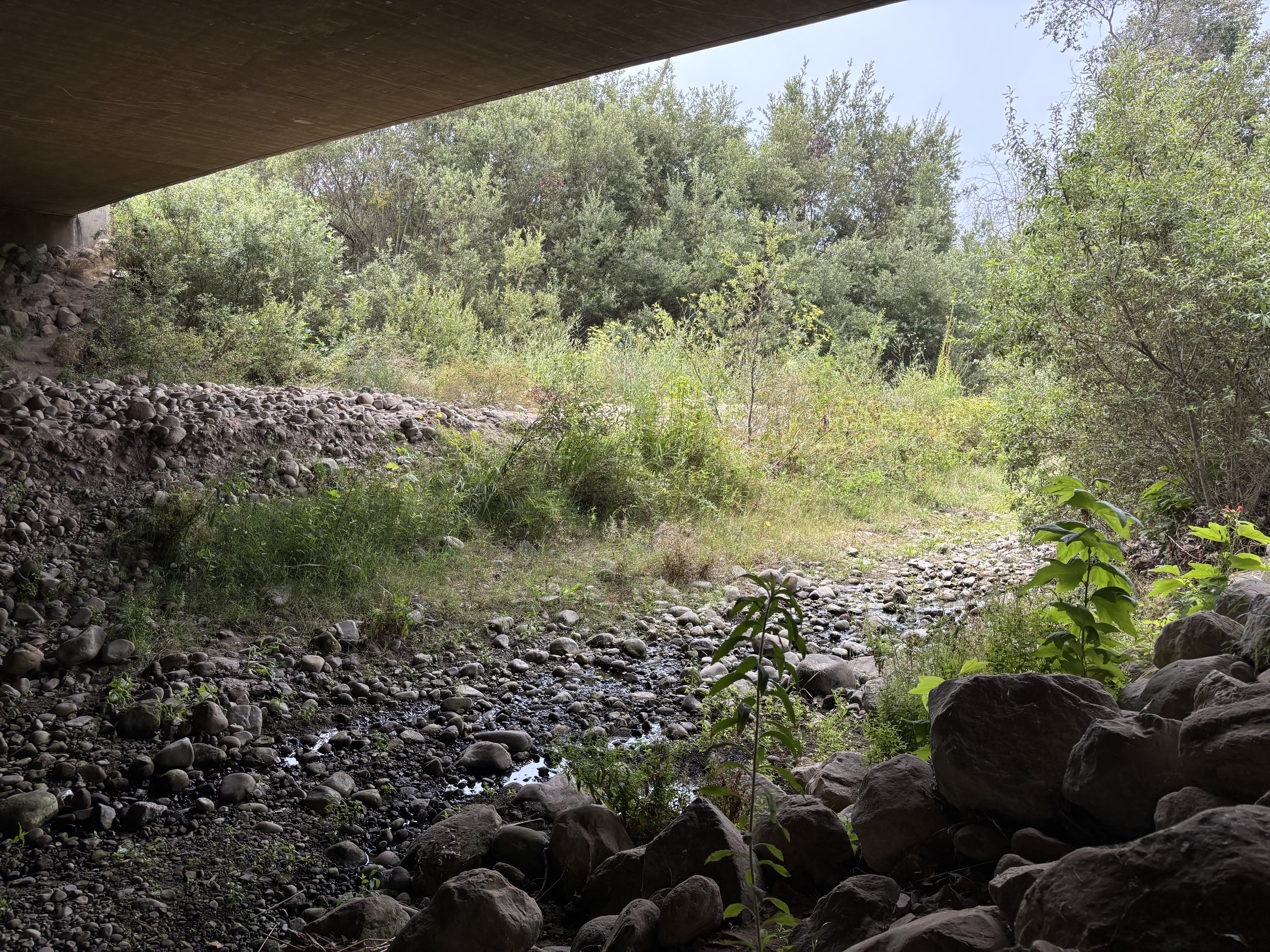
Carpinteria Creek under the 101 during the summer dry season

The Carpinteria Creek watershed drains 15.3 square miles (40 km^{2}). Carpinteria Creek originates at 3,460 feet (1,050 m) above sea level, and its main tributaries are Sutton Canyon Creek and Gobernador Creek. The tributaries of Gobernador Creek are El Dorado Creek and Steer Creek. The latter's source is on Divide Peak at 4,690 feet (1,430 m) elevation. Unlike many other southern California coastal streams, Carpinteria Creek still runs freely under open spans (rather than through culverts) at both the Union Pacific tracks and the 101 freeway. The creek is perennial through the urban reach of the creek. An historical map from 1869 showed that the Carpinteria salt marsh "El Estero" extended almost to Carpinteria Creek.

== Ecology ==
Once a significant spawning stream for hundreds of southern steelhead trout (Oncorhynchus mykiss), trout are now rare visitors to Carpinteria Creek. Other threatened and endangered species in the creek include Coulter's goldfields, Coulter's saltbush, Ventura marsh milk-vetch, late-flowered mariposa lily, monarch butterfly, sandy beach tiger beetle, tidewater goby, and western snowy plover. Trees in the upper watershed include white alder, California sycamore, black cottonwood and coast live oak, and in the lower watershed include California sycamore, southern walnut and arroyo willow.

Monarch butterflies winter at Salzgeber Meadow, which is located along the eastern bank of Carpinteria Creek upstream of the railroad tracks.

== Conservation ==
Major habitat restoration efforts include removal on non-native giant reed (Arundo donax) and other water-thirsty species as well as removal of non-native iceplant from the coastal area.
