= North Campus =

North Campus may refer to:

== United States ==
- North Campus at the City College of New York, in New York City, New York
- North Campus at the Community College of Allegheny County, in Allegheny County, Pennsylvania
- North Campus at Cornell University, in Ithaca, New York
- North Campus at Pomona College, in Claremont, California
- North Campus at Salem State University, in Salem, Massachusetts
- North Campus at Staten Island University Hospital, in New York City, New York
- North Campus at the University at Buffalo, in Buffalo, New York
- North Campus Open Space by the University of California, Santa Barbara, in Santa Barbara County, California
- North Campus at the University of Michigan, in Ann Arbor, Michigan
- North Campus at the University of Washington, in Seattle, Washington
- North Campus at Valdosta State University, in Valdosta, Georgia
- North Campus at the York College of Pennsylvania, in York, Pennsylvania

== Other countries ==
- North Campus at Sun Yat-sen University, in Guangzhou, Guangdong, China
- North Campus at the University of Copenhagen, in Copenhagen, Capital Region, Denmark
- North Campus at the University of Delhi, in Delhi, India
- North Campus at Xi'an Jiaotong–Liverpool University, in Suzhou, Jiangsu, China
