= Katherine Esau =

German-American botanist (1898–1997)

- Born: 3 April 1898; Yekaterinoslav, Russian Empire
- Died: 4 June 1997 (aged 99); Santa Barbara, California
- Education: University of California, Davis
- Awards: National Medal of Science (1989)
- Scientific career
- Fields: Botany
- Thesis: Some pathological changes in the anatomy of leaves of the sugar beet (Beta vulgaris L.) affected by the curly-top disease (1931)

Katherine Esau (3 April 1898 – 4 June 1997) was a pioneering German-American botanist who studied plant anatomy and the effects of viruses. Her books Plant Anatomy (1953, 1965, 2006) and Anatomy of Seed Plants (1960, 1977) are key texts. In 1989, Esau received the National Medal of Science "In recognition of her distinguished service to the American community of plant biologists, and for the excellence of her pioneering research, both basic and applied, on plant structure and development, which has spanned more than six decades; for her superlative performance as an educator, in the classroom and through her books; for the encouragement and inspiration she has given to a legion of young, aspiring plant biologists; and for providing a special role model for women in science."

== Personal life and education ==
Esau was born on 3 April 1898 in Ekaterinoslav, Russian Empire a family of Mennonites of German descent, so-called "Russian Mennonites". She attended a Mennonite Parish school prior to entering secondary school. Esau began studying agriculture in 1916 at the Golitsin Women's Agricultural College in Moscow, but returned home at the end of her second semester due to the Bolshevik Revolution.

Katherine's father, John Esau, was the mayor of Ekaterinoslav. The revolution placed the family at risk due to their wealth, position, and nationality. Esau was considered a "counterrevolutionary bourgeoisie". The family managed to escape by boarding a German troop train in Ekaterinoslav on 20 December 1918, reaching Berlin on 5 January 1919 after a two-week trip.

Although Berlin was still in conflict, Katherine became a student at the Berlin Landwirtschaftliche Hochschule (Agricultural College of Berlin). She studied farm management with Friedrich Aereboe and plant breeding with geneticist Erwin Baur.

In 1922, the Esau family moved to Reedley, California, a Mennonite community. Esau worked briefly as a housekeeper and cook for a family in Fresno. In 1923, she worked for a seed production ranch, raising and studying sugar beets in Oxnard, California. After that company failed, Esau worked for the Spreckels Sugar Company on sugar beet resistance to curly top virus.

In 1927, Spreckels was visited by Wilfred William Robbins, from the University Farm of the Northern Branch of the College of Agriculture (now University of California, Davis), and Henry A. Jones of the Davis Division of Truck Crops. Esau showed them her beet fields and asked about the graduate program at Davis. Robbins accepted her and employed her as a graduate assistant in the Botany Division. Esau resumed her education at the University of California, Davis in 1928. Since Davis did not grant graduate degrees at that time, she officially registered for the Ph.D. program through the University of California Berkeley. Her doctoral committee were W.W. Robbins, (botanist and the chair), T.H. Goodspeed, cytologist, and T.E. Rawlins, plant pathologist. Esau was formally awarded a doctorate in 1931 which was granted by UC Berkeley in 1932. She was also elected to the Phi Beta Kappa honor society in 1932.

Esau then joined the faculty in the new post of Junior Botanist in the Agricultural Experiment Station in the College of Agriculture. She taught at the University of California, Davis from 1932 to 1963. In 1963 she moved to University of California, Santa Barbara to better continue collaborative work with Vernon I. Cheadle.

Esau died on 4 June 1997 in Santa Barbara, California, USA.

== Research ==
Esau was a pioneering plant anatomist and her books Plant Anatomy (1953) and Anatomy of Seed Plants (1960) are considered "iconic texts" in plant structural biology. Her early work in plant anatomy focused on the effect of viruses on plants, specifically on plant tissue and development. Her doctoral research had changed from field to laboratory study of curly top virus disease of sugar beet because of the difficulty of containing field infections with the disease. This led to her focus on plant anatomy and especially phloem tissue that was the subject of her scientific career. She soon discovered that the virus spread through the plants along the phloem. She began applying electron microscopy to her research in 1960.

While teaching at the University of California, Davis, she continued her research on viruses and specifically phloem, the food conducting tissue in plants. In the 1950s, she collaborated with botanist Vernon Cheadle on more phloem research. Her treatise The Phloem (1969) was published as Volume 5 of the Handbuch der Pflanzenanatomie. This volume has been recognized as the most important of the series and was a definitive source of information about phloem.

Esau continued research well into her 90s, publishing a total of 162 articles and five books. Her papers are held by the Department of Special Collections in the Davidson Library at the University of California, Santa Barbara. She was official mentor to only 15 doctoral students but her exceptional ability as a teacher was recognised and appreciated by many. Ray Evert, one of Esau's graduate students, says: "The book Plant Anatomy brought to life what previously had seemed to me to be a rather dull subject. I was not the only one so affected. Plant Anatomy had an enormous impact worldwide, literally bringing about a revivification of the discipline."

Esau did not seem to attach importance to the recognition accorded her, and she told David Russell, who compiled her oral history, "I don't know how I happened to be elected [for the National Medal of Science]. I have no idea what impressed them about me." When asked by Elga Wasserman to reflect on her education and career, Esau wrote in 1973 that scientific activities dominated her career and added, "I found ways of maintaining spiritual independence while adjusting myself to established policies. . . . I have never felt that my career was being affected by the fact that I am a woman." In addition that, after being asked in 1992 if she saw herself as a pioneer woman in science, Esau replied, "This is such a funny thing. I never worried about being a woman. It never occurred to me that that was an important thing. I always thought that women could do just as well as men. Of course, the majority of women are not trained to think that way. They are trained to be homemakers. And I was not a homemaker."

== Recognition ==
- She was elected a Fellow of the American Academy of Arts and Sciences in 1949.
- In 1951, she was President of the Botanical Society of America.
- In 1956, the Botanical Society of America awarded her a Certificate of Merit in its Golden Jubilee celebrations.
- In 1957, she was the sixth woman elected as a member of the National Academy of Sciences.
- In 1962, she was awarded an honorary degree by Mills College, Oakland.
- In 1964, she was elected to the American Philosophical Society.
- In 1989 President George Bush awarded Esau the National Medal of Science.

== Legacy ==
Many of Esau's publications are housed and available for loan from the Cornelius Herman Muller library at the University of California, Santa Barbara's Cheadle Center for Biodiversity and Ecological Restoration.

In memory of her contributions as a lecturer, author and scientist, the Katherine Esau Award is awarded to the graduate student who presents the best paper in structural and developmental biology at the annual meeting of the Botanical Society of America.

Esau established the Katherine Esau Fellowship Program in 1993 at the University of California, Davis. This supports post-doctoral, junior faculty and some summer graduate fellowships.

== Works ==
Her books modernised plant anatomy teaching and were in use into the twenty-first century:

- Esau, Katherine (1953). Plant Anatomy. (1st ed. 1954; 2nd ed. 1965; 3rd ed. 2006). McGraw-Hill, New York.
- Esau, Katherine (2006). Evert, Ray Franklin (ed.). Esau's Plant anatomy : meristems, cells, and tissues of the plant body : their structure, function, and development (3rd ed.). Hoboken, N.J.: Wiley-Interscience. doi:10.1002/0470047380.fmatter. ISBN 978-0-471-73843-5.
- Esau, Katherine (1960). Anatomy of Seed Plants. (2nd ed. 1977). John Wiley & Sons, New York, ISBN 0-471-24520-8
- Esau, Katherine (1961). Plants, Viruses, and Insects. Harvard University Press, Cambridge.
- Esau, Katherine (1965). Vascular Differentiation in Plants. Holt, Rinehart & Winston, 160pp
- Esau, Katherine (1968). Viruses in Plant Hosts. University of Wisconsin Press, Madison 228pp
- Esau, Katherine (1969). The Phloem. (Handbuch der Pflanzenanatomie, Histologie Band 5, Teil 2). Gebrüder Borntraeger, Berlin.
