= Quercus tinkhamii =

Conservation status
- Data Deficient (IUCN 3.1)

Scientific classification
- Kingdom: Plantae
- Clade: Embryophytes
- Clade: Tracheophytes
- Clade: Spermatophytes
- Clade: Angiosperms
- Clade: Eudicots
- Clade: Rosids
- Order: Fagales
- Family: Fagaceae
- Genus: Quercus
- Subgenus: Quercus subg. Quercus
- Section: Quercus sect. Quercus
- Species: Q. tinkhamii

Binomial name
- Quercus tinkhamii C.H.Mull.

Species of oak tree

Quercus tinkhamii is a species of oak endemic to the Sierra Madre Oriental of eastern Mexico.

== Description ==
Quercus tinkhamii is a shrubby oak.

== Range and habitat ==
Quercus tinkhamii is native to the central Sierra Madre Oriental and some sky island ranges on the Mexican Plateau, in the states of Chihuahua, Hidalgo, Nuevo León, San Luis Potosí, and Tamaulipas.

Quercus tinkhamii grows in oak-pine forest and xerophilic scrubland above 1,400 meters elevation.
