= Steer Creek =

Steer Creek may refer to:

- Steer Creek (California), a tributary of Carpinteria Creek
- Steer Creek (West Virginia), a tributary of the Little Kanawha River
