= North Campus Open Space =

Coordinates: 34°25′09″N 119°52′39″W

North Campus Open Space (NCOS) is a 136-acre wetland and upland restoration project (55 ha) in Goleta, California. Managed by the Cheadle Center for Biodiversity and Ecological Restoration (CCBER), a research center under the Office of Research at the University of California, Santa Barbara (UCSB), the property had been previously developed into a golf course. The project included the restoration of the historic upper half of Devereux Slough and adjacent upland and wetland habitats that support important local native plant and animal species (including rare and threatened species), reducing flood risk, providing a buffer against predicted sea level rise, and contributing to carbon sequestration while also supporting public access and outreach, and facilitating research and educational opportunities.

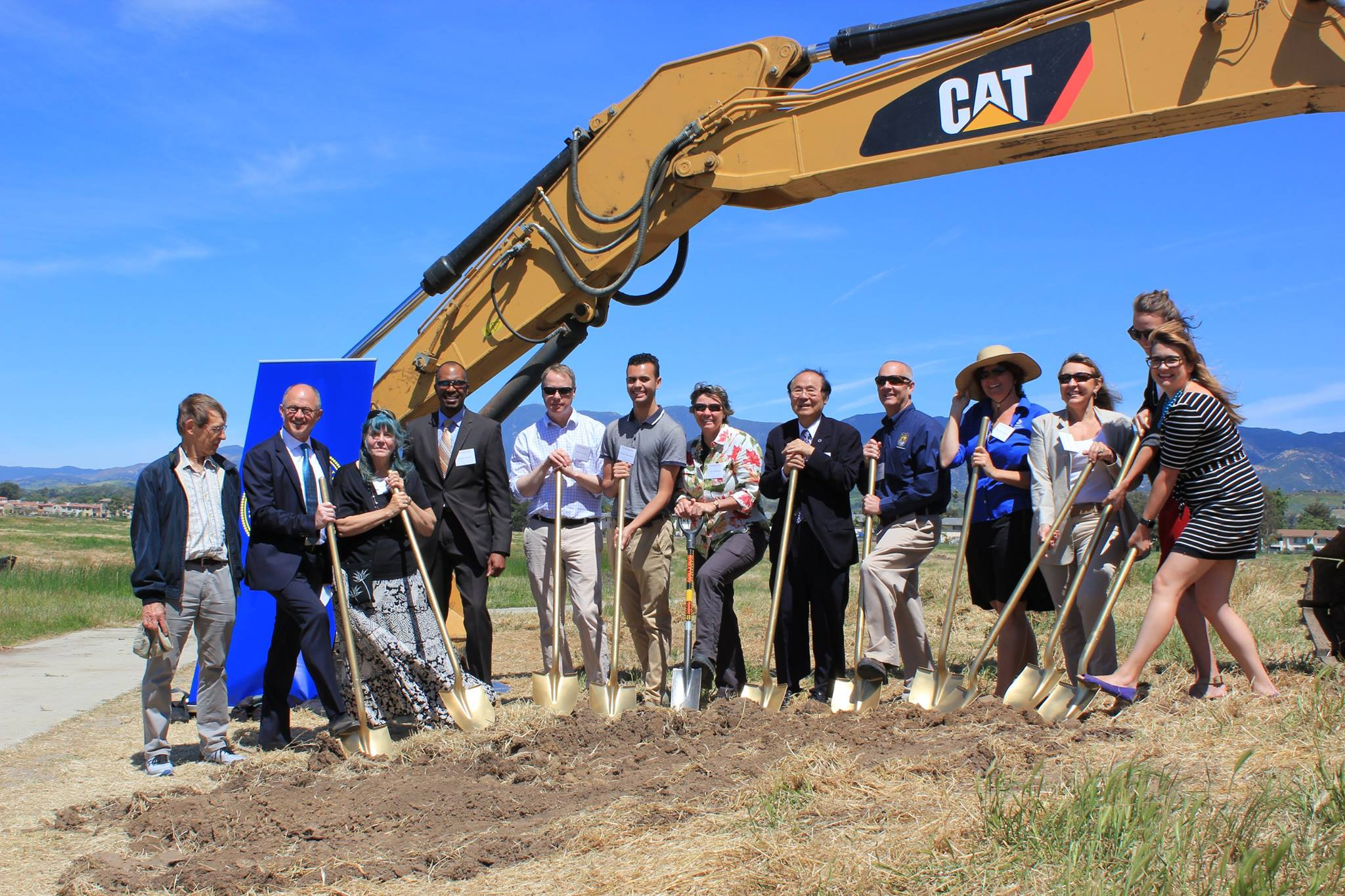
Members of the collaborative effort to establish the NCOS restoration project, including Chancellor Yang, celebrate the project launch at a groundbreaking ceremony in April 2017.

== History ==
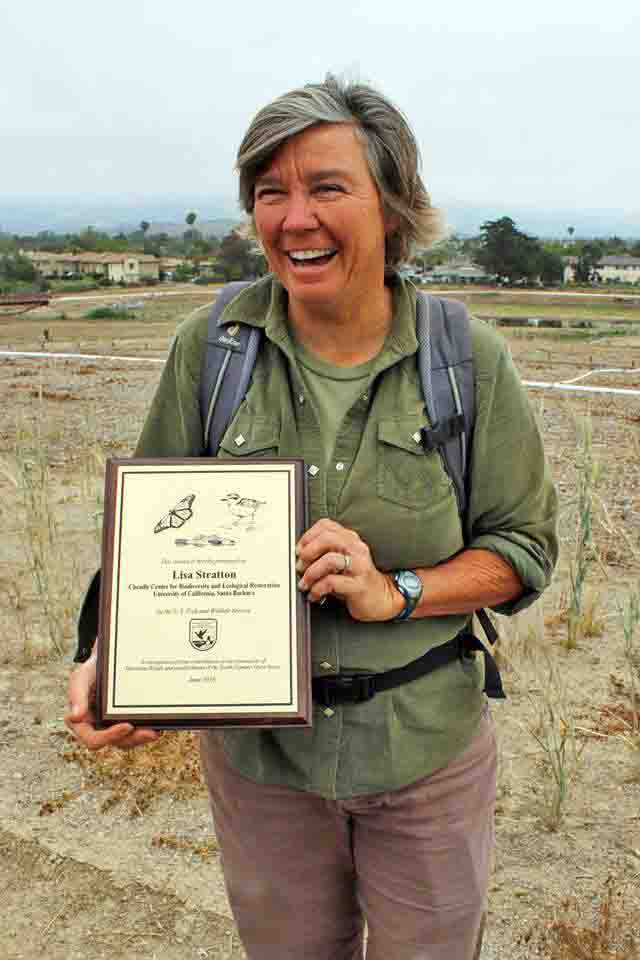
Lisa Stratton, the director of ecosystem management at CCBER, holds an award gifted by the U.S. Fish and Wildlife service for her efforts and involvement in the NCOS restoration project. Photo by Robyn Gerstenslager.

In 2013, The Trust for Public Land purchased 63 acres (25 ha) of the former golf course with $7 million of grant funding from several federal, state, and local agencies, and gifted the property to The Regents of the University of California. Integration of surrounding uplands has created the 136-acre expanse of protected land (55 ha) that makes up NCOS today. The Regents of the University of California, with the help of local environmental agencies and research centers like CCBER, is now in charge of long-term ecological restoration and stewardship of this open space.

The primary funders for this project are the U.S. Fish and Wildlife Service, the California Department of Fish and Wildlife, Caltrans, the California Natural Resources Agency, the Department of Water Resources Urban Streams program, the State Coastal Conservancy, the Ocean Protection Council, and the Wildlife Conservation Board, along with other environmental agencies.

Restoration efforts at NCOS, directed by CCBER, began in 2017. The excavation and relocation of approximately 350,000 cubic yards of topsoil was used to fill the wetland in the mid-1960s for creating the Ocean Meadows golf course. Before the restoration project began, the golf course would often flood during winter storms, and this posed a growing flood risk associated with climate change for immediately adjacent neighborhoods. Restoration efforts have lowered the floodplain by nearly two feet, removing local residents from the flood plain entirely. The excavated soil from the upper half of Devereux Slough was placed on the southwestern portion of the site to form a mesa for a native perennial grassland and other habitats. Other restoration efforts include the removal of non-native species, and restoration and reintroduction of native species. In 2018, 60 percent of the 80 acres (32 ha) to be vegetated had been planted; 37 acres (15 ha) of wetlands were being restored and regaining function, and wildlife species were increasingly using the habitat features placed by CCBER.

=== Rare Species Conservation ===
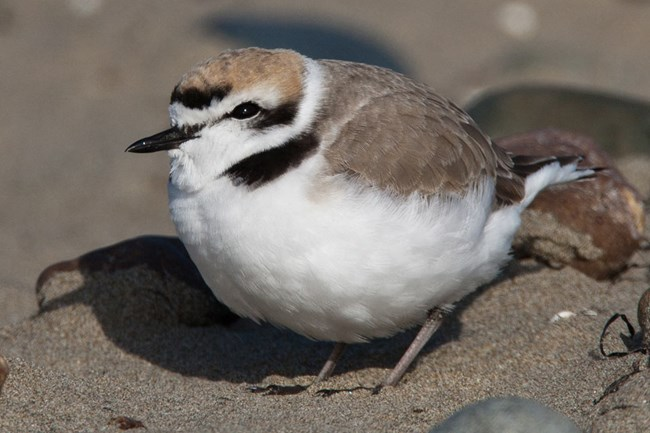
The western snowy plover is a shorebird that remains in decline due to habitat loss, human disturbance, and other factors.

The restoration of NCOS is supporting the recovery of rare, threatened and/or endangered species including but not limited to the Western Snowy Plover, California Least Tern, Burrowing Owl, Crotch's Bumblebee, Western Pond Turtle, Belding's Savannah Sparrow and the Ventura marsh milk-vetch.

==== Western Snowy Plover ====
Coal Oil Point Reserve, a protected area adjacent to NCOS, boasts one of the most productive populations of the Western Snowy Plover, a rare and threatened shorebird species. Western Snowy Plovers have begun using the sand flat habitat at NCOS that is specifically designed for them.

==== Ventura marsh milk-vetch ====
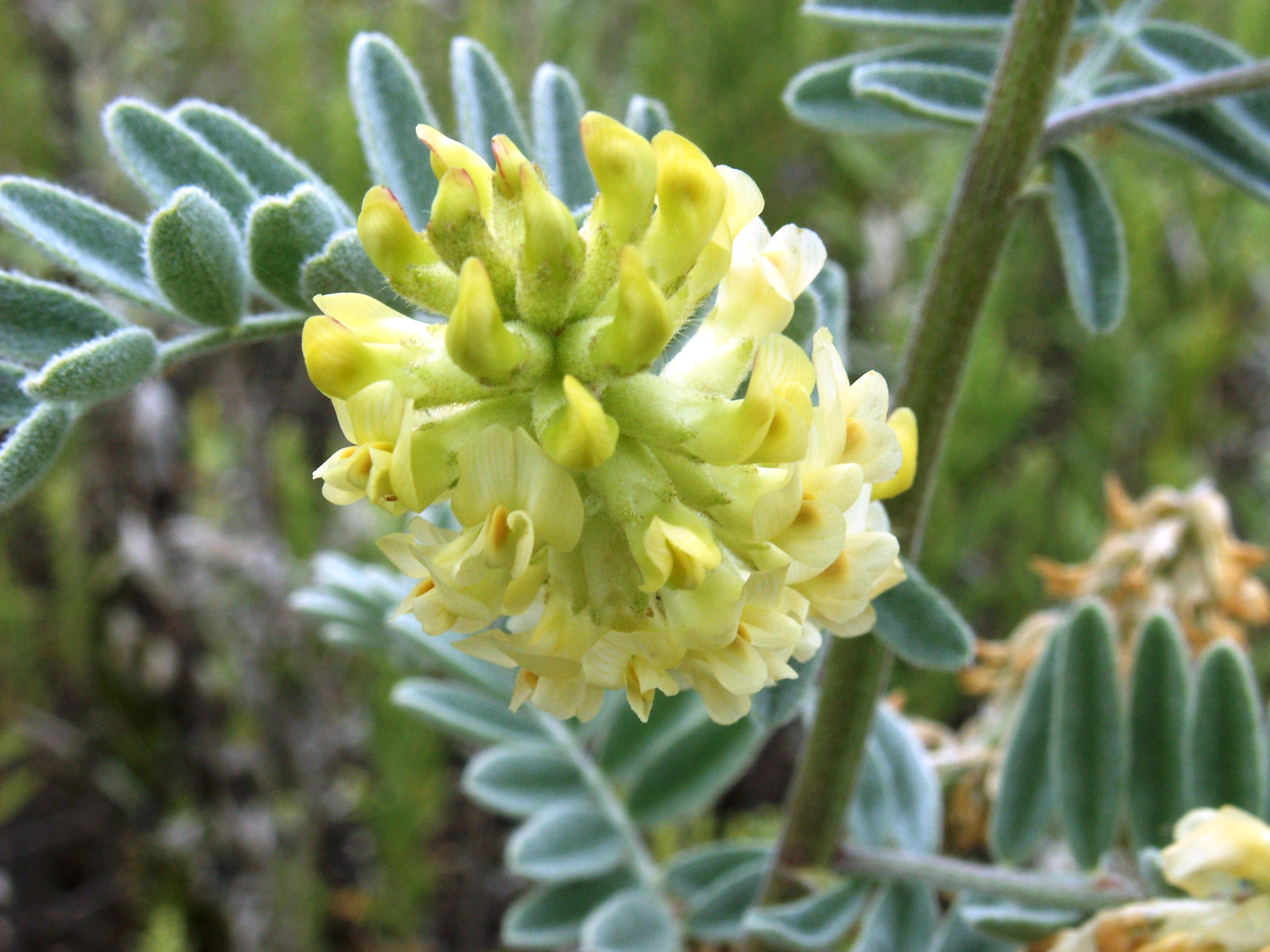
Ventura marsh milk-vetch, a once extinct plant species is one of the rare plants being restored at NCOS.

This species was extinct in the area for 30 years before it was discovered in Oxnard when U.S. Fish and Wildlife Service staff were surveying a proposed development site near Mandalay Beach. The plant was propagated by CCBER and reintroduced to NCOS in 2019, and is reportedly establishing well.

== Community access and Engagement ==
=== Education ===
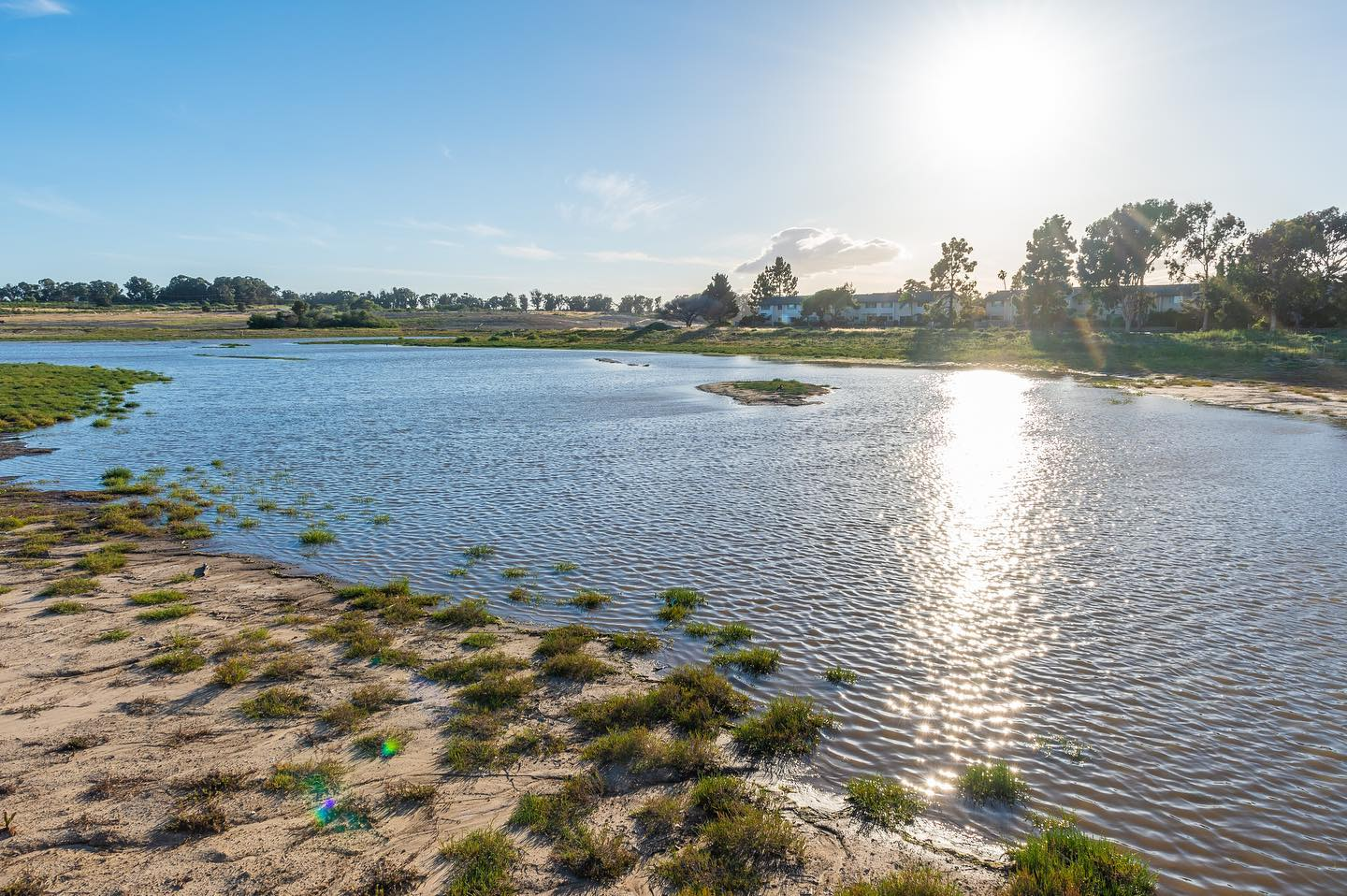
Restored from a former golf course, the Slough at NCOS is filled with water after rains in 2019, protecting nearby neighborhoods from flood-risk.

The NCOS restoration project is geared towards community engagement through public access, education, and research programs. CCBER directs educational programs like Kids in Nature, a K-12 resource that utilizes CCBER's natural spaces, such as NCOS, for a means of teaching students about the local natural world and ecology. UCSB professors and students use NCOS for research such as tracking and estimating wildlife populations or measuring greenhouse gas fluxes from wetlands. Faculty and students are able to utilize field studies at NCOS to improve understanding of ecosystem functions and the consequences of climate change.

=== Recreation ===
As of March 2021, there are 2.5 miles of trails, a visitor plaza with interpretive signs, and overlooks with benches that promote exploration and wildlife viewing opportunities throughout the natural space. The Marsh Trail connects with a bus stop on Storke Road, adjacent homes, neighborhoods, bike paths, roads, and other open space such as Ellwood Mesa and Coal Oil Point Reserve. This ADA accessible trail provides an alternative, and a safer route to school for around 200 children.
