= Cheadle Center for Biodiversity and Ecological Restoration =

Research center at the University of California, Santa Barbara

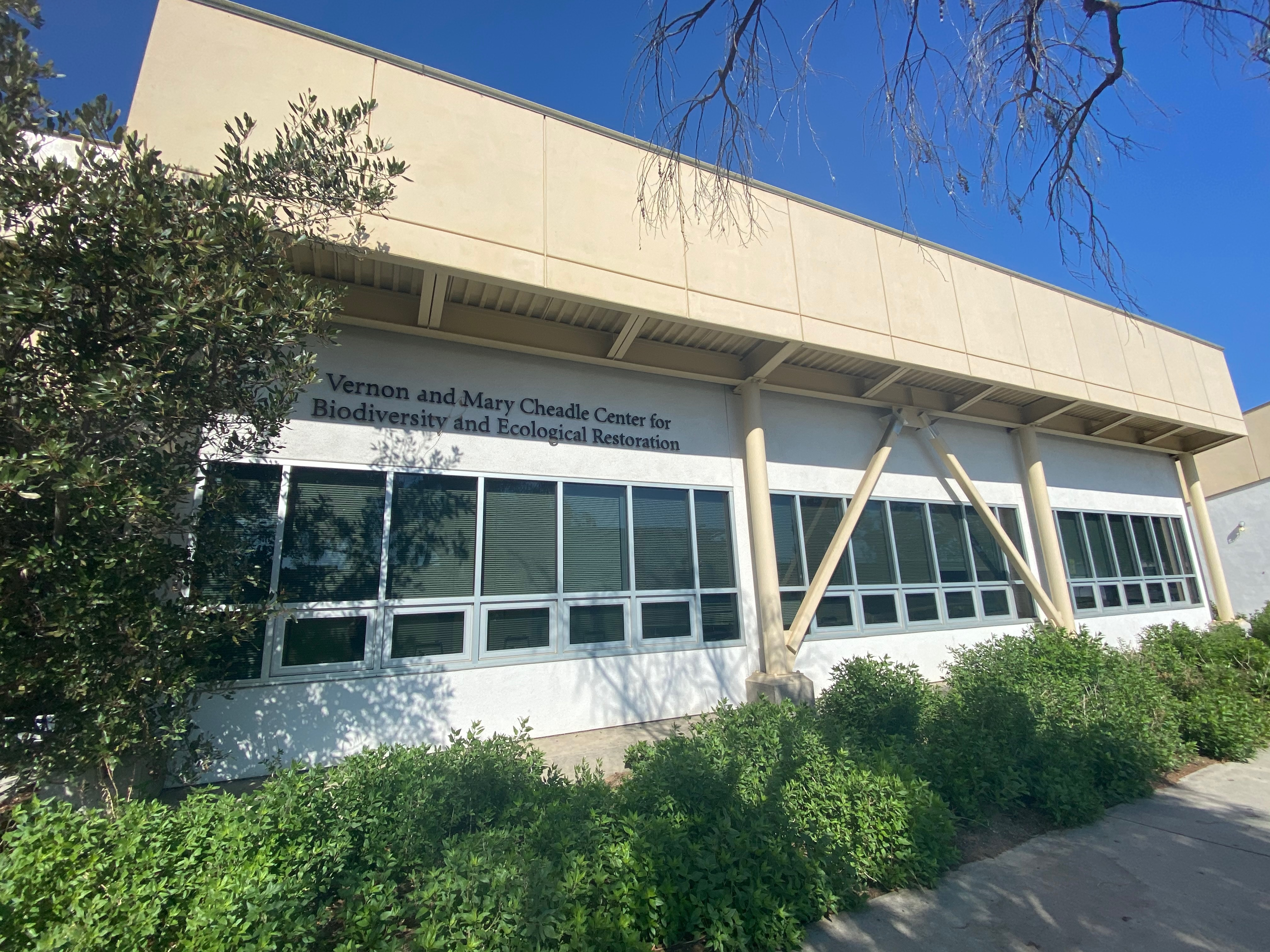
Pictured above is CCBER's main office where collections are kept. Located in Goleta, California.

The Cheadle Center for Biodiversity and Ecological Restoration (CCBER) is a research center under the Office of Research at the University of California, Santa Barbara (UCSB) whose mission is to preserve regional biodiversity and restore ecosystems on campus lands. CCBER has three main functions: curation and preservation of natural history collections, native coastal ecosystem and habitat restoration on campus lands, and education and outreach for both UCSB students and local community schools.

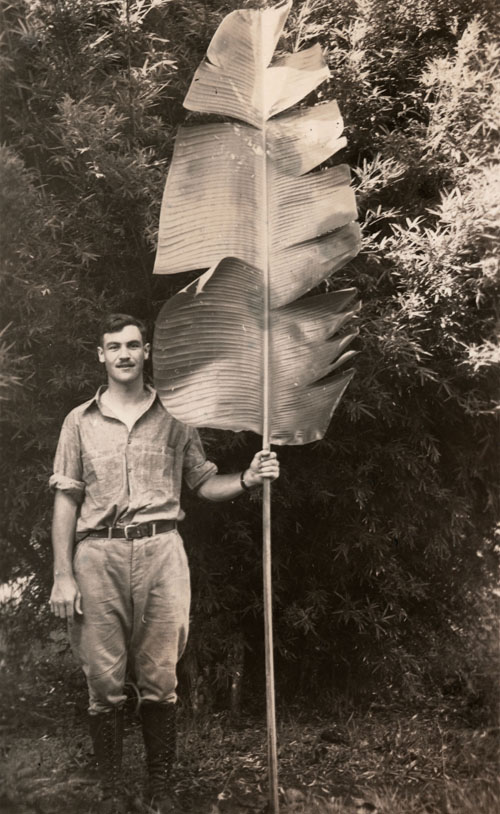
Vernon Cheadle, the Chancellor of UCSB 1963–1977, was a botanist focused on the examination of the anatomical and phylogenetic specialization of vessels in monocotyledons.

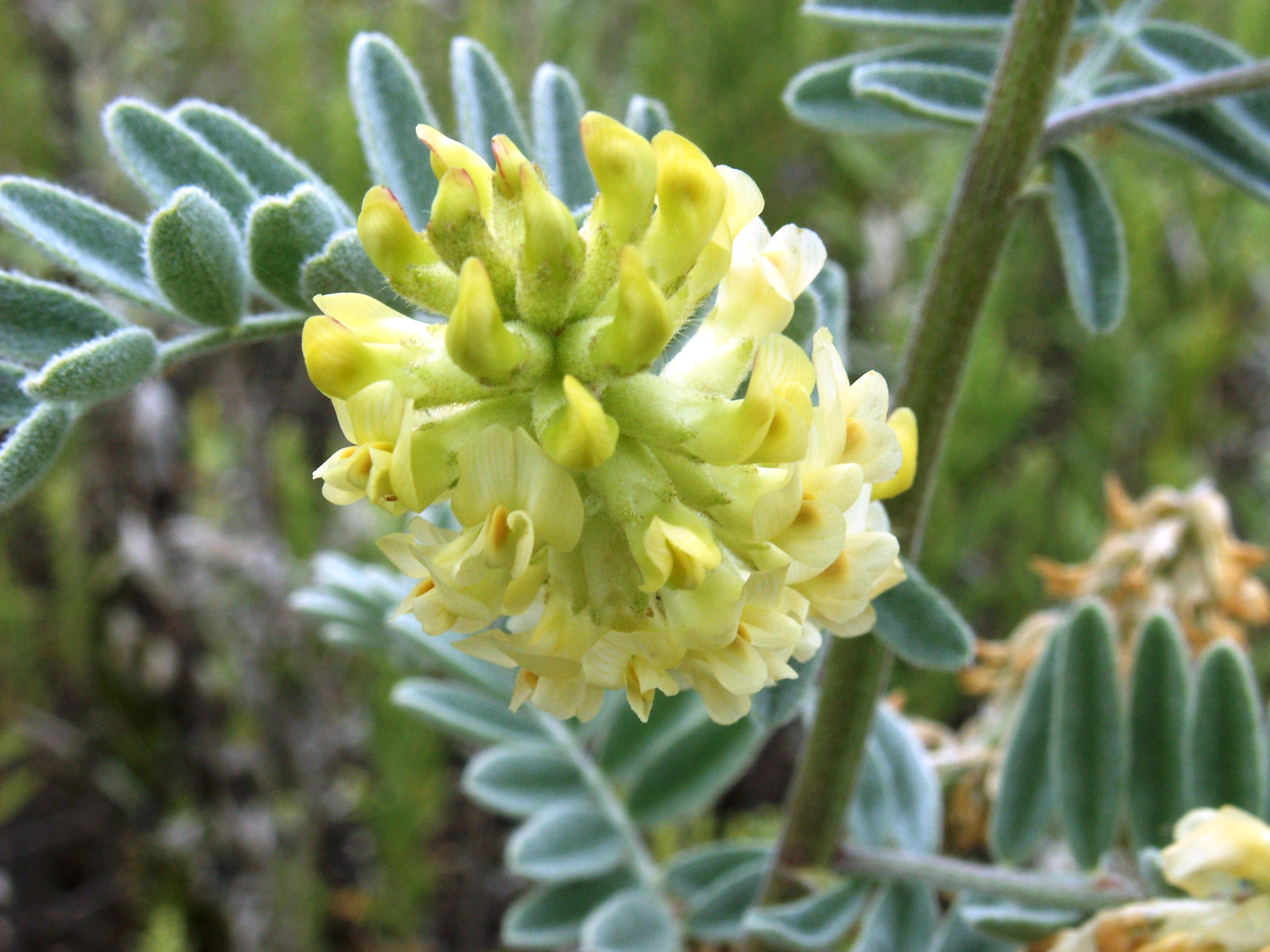
The Ventura marsh milk-vetch, a plant thought to be extinct for 30 years, is being reintroduced by CCBER.

== History ==
In 1954, a UCSB faculty member, Dr. Cornelius H. Muller, founded a herbarium to be used for research and teaching. Another faculty member, Mary Erickson, founded a vertebrate collection with similar goals. In 1995, the two facilities merged to become the Museum of Systematics and Ecology (MSE). In 2005, MSE teamed up with the UCSB ecological restoration program, whose director was Wayne Ferren, to become CCBER. CCBER's first director was Jennifer Thorsch, a botanical researcher at UCSB.

CCBER was named after Vernon and Mary Cheadle. Vernon Cheadle was the chancellor at UCSB between 1962 and 1977, but also a botanist who, along with Katherine Esau, contributed thousands of specimens to CCBER's natural history collections. Vernon Cheadle and Katherine Esau formed a research partnership at UC Davis in 1950, and when Cheadle became the chancellor of UCSB in 1962, Esau followed so they could continue their collaboration. Katherine Esau, a pioneering plant anatomist, focused much of her work on phloem, the food conducting cells in higher plants. Esau published numerous award-winning botany textbooks, including "Plant Anatomy," published in 1953. The Cheadle and Esau families have made generous donations that have ensured the long-term operation of CCBER.

The current senior staff at CCBER are: Katja Seltmann (Kathrine Esau Director), Lisa Stratton (Director of Ecosystem Management), and Gregory Wahlert (Shirley Tucker Curator of Biodiversity Collections and Botanical Research).

== Projects and Programs ==
=== Ecological Restoration ===
CCBER conducts varying amounts of native ecosystem and habitat restoration and management on over 300 acres of open-space on the UCSB campus, between the Goleta Slough and Elwood Mesa in Goleta, California. The open space areas are used for multiple purposes, such as ecosystem and native habitat restoration and conservation, education, research, outreach, and community involvement.

According to Section 30607.1 of the California Coastal Act, when UCSB plans to develop and potentially damage land, specifically wetlands, they must undertake restoration projects on separate pieces of land of equal or greater area and biological productivity in order to mitigate the ecological impacts of construction. Many of these restoration efforts are handed over to CCBER, including San Clemente wetland, the lot 38 bioswale, North Bluff and the Campus Lagoon.

Some of the open space areas managed by CCBER already contained portions of intact native vegetation and/or wetlands that are protected by the Clean Water Act and Coastal Act, as well as areas that are being restored after significant human impacts, such as North Bluff, Campus Lagoon, Manzanita Village, Storke Wetlands, San Clemente wetlands, and the 136-acre (55 ha) North Campus Open Space. While many of CCBER's restoration projects are products of this agreement, many are also volunteer based restoration projects. Examples of CCBER's volunteer based restoration projects include parts of Campus Lagoon, and most of North Campus Open Space.

CCBER's management areas include: East Bluff, Campus Lagoon, Lot 38 Bioswale, Manzanita Village, North Bluff, North Campus Open Space (NCOS), North Parcel, San Clemente, San Joaquin, Sierra Madre, South Parcel, and Storke Wetland. The open spaces managed by CCBER are characterized by coastal dune, oak woodland, coastal sage scrub, grassland, and wetland ecosystems.

Restoration methods include non-native species removal, reintroduction of native species, and often the creation of wetland features such as bioswales and vernal pools. In some cases, the restoration involves the removal or conversion of structures built during previous uses or ownership of the land. For example, nearly half of the area that comprises NCOS was the site of a former golf course before CCBER began restoring the wetland and upland habitats that previously existed there.

=== Natural History Collections ===
CCBER runs the UCSB Natural History Collection, which houses around half a million individual plant, insect, and vertebrate specimens including: invertebrates, mammals, birds, reptiles, vascular plants, algae, and lichen. This collection is maintained by CCBER for educational, research, and outreach purposes.

The UCSB Natural History Collections at CCBER provide data for research and support mentoring and training for collection curators and student-driven research projects.

"Capturing California's Flowers," one of CCBER's current projects made possible through a National Science Foundation grant, will allow CCBER to digitize more than 900,000 plant specimens. Digitalization of these specimens will make them available online for anyone to use for research and education.

Another National Science Foundation grant of $4.3 million will allow Katja Seltmann, the center's Collections Director, to investigate terrestrial parasite species. Investigation of these species is conducted because arthropods are major carriers of diseases to humans worldwide, and scientists like Seltmann are investigating how they will respond to the shifting climate. Seltmann uses an online data server called Ontobee to share data with the 27 other research institutions working on the Terrestrial Parasite Tracker project.

CCBER also conducts research by monitoring wildlife, partnered with iNaturalist and the Audubon Society.

=== Access to Collections and Research ===
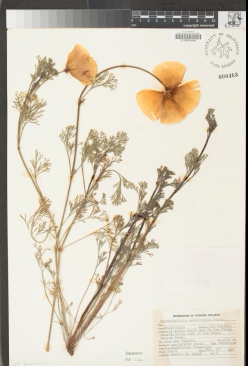
CCBER is currently working on digitizing specimens of their natural history collection, making the collection accessible on a large database for research and education.

For over 60 years CCBER's collections have contributed to the research and educational missions of UCSB. Natural history collections and collection-based research are vital to discovering, understanding, and documenting biodiversity and to inform public policy on such issues as invasive species, climate change, evolution, and emerging public health threats. Natural history collections represent the irreplaceable documentation of life on Earth.

CCBER's collections are available for use by university faculty, researchers, staff, and students as well as community members, including biological consultants, governmental agencies, K-12 educators and their students. The digitalization of CCBER's collection will make their specimens available to a global audience.

CCBER is conducting research to help understand how ecosystems will shift as a result of climate change, with a goal of developing adaptation and mitigation strategies. CCBER's primary research areas include the Coastal Ecosystem Restoration Research Program, Arthropods of Coastal California, Plant Speciation via Hybridization and Allopolyploidy, Natural History Collection Information Science, and Endangered Endemic Plants.

=== Education ===
CCBER involves itself in community education through UCSB courses, field guides, placement of interpretive placards, workshops, seminars, a K-12 environmental education program, and tours. It also provides field and lab-based resources for faculty, staff, and students at UCSB.

== Affiliates and Funding ==
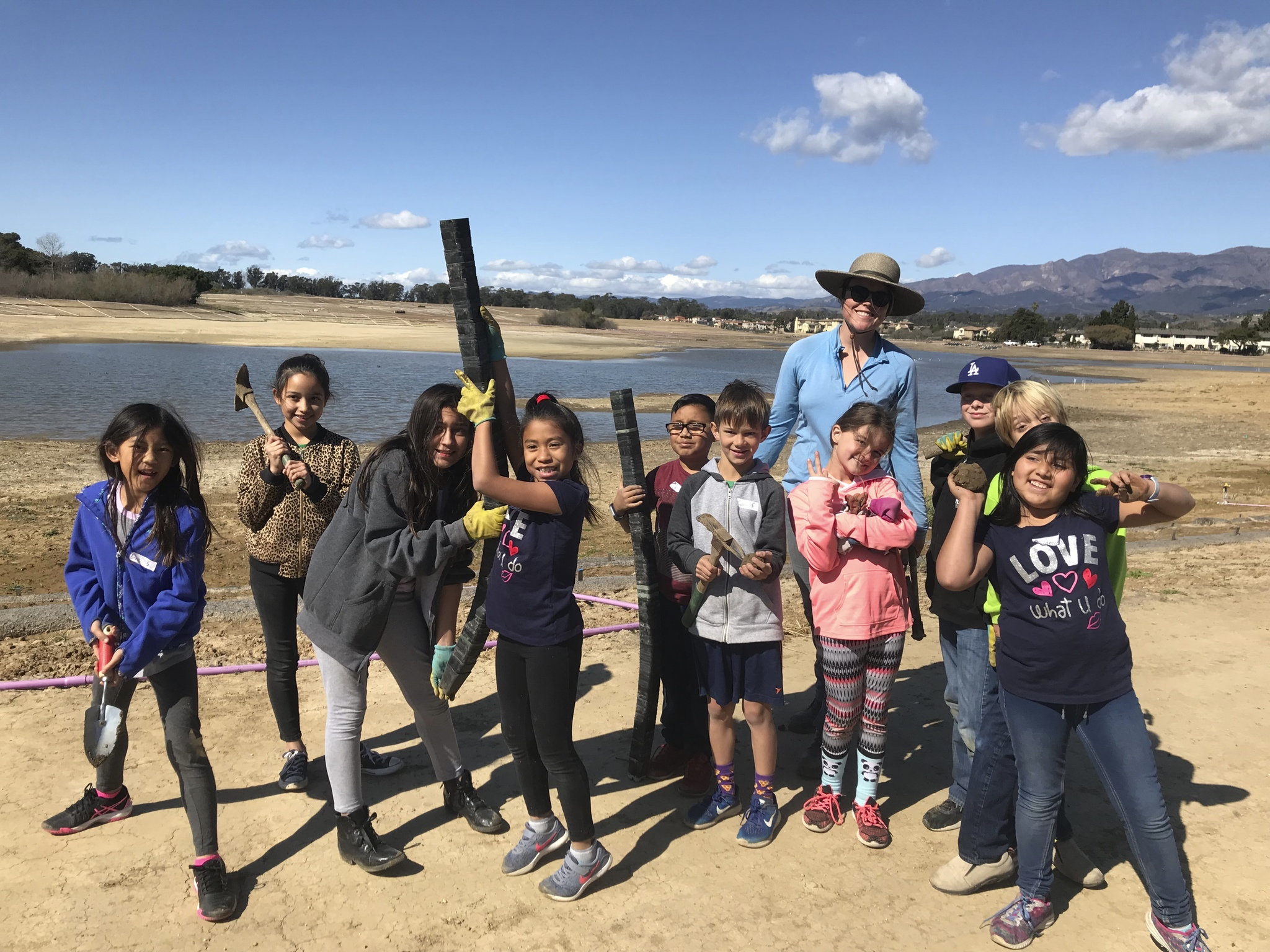
Kids in Nature (KIN) is a K-12 education program run by CCBER .

CCBER is funded through grants for scientific research and restoration from institutions like the National Science Foundation and Museum and Library Services, and agencies such as CalTrans and U.S. Fish and Wildlife. CCBER is a non-profit and relies largely on donations and grants to do program work. A grant awarded in 2013 by the Institute of Museum and Library Services (IMLS), will allow CCBER to digitize around 70,000 of the specimens in their Natural History collection.

Another way CCBER receives funding is through UCSB construction and UCSB's relationship with the California Coastal Commission. According to Section 30607.1 of the California Coastal Act, when UCSB plans to develop and potentially damage land, specifically land containing wetlands, they must hand over an equal area of land, with equal or greater biological productivity for restoration efforts. CCBER serves as a campus agency that helps with locating and restoring these mitigation areas.
