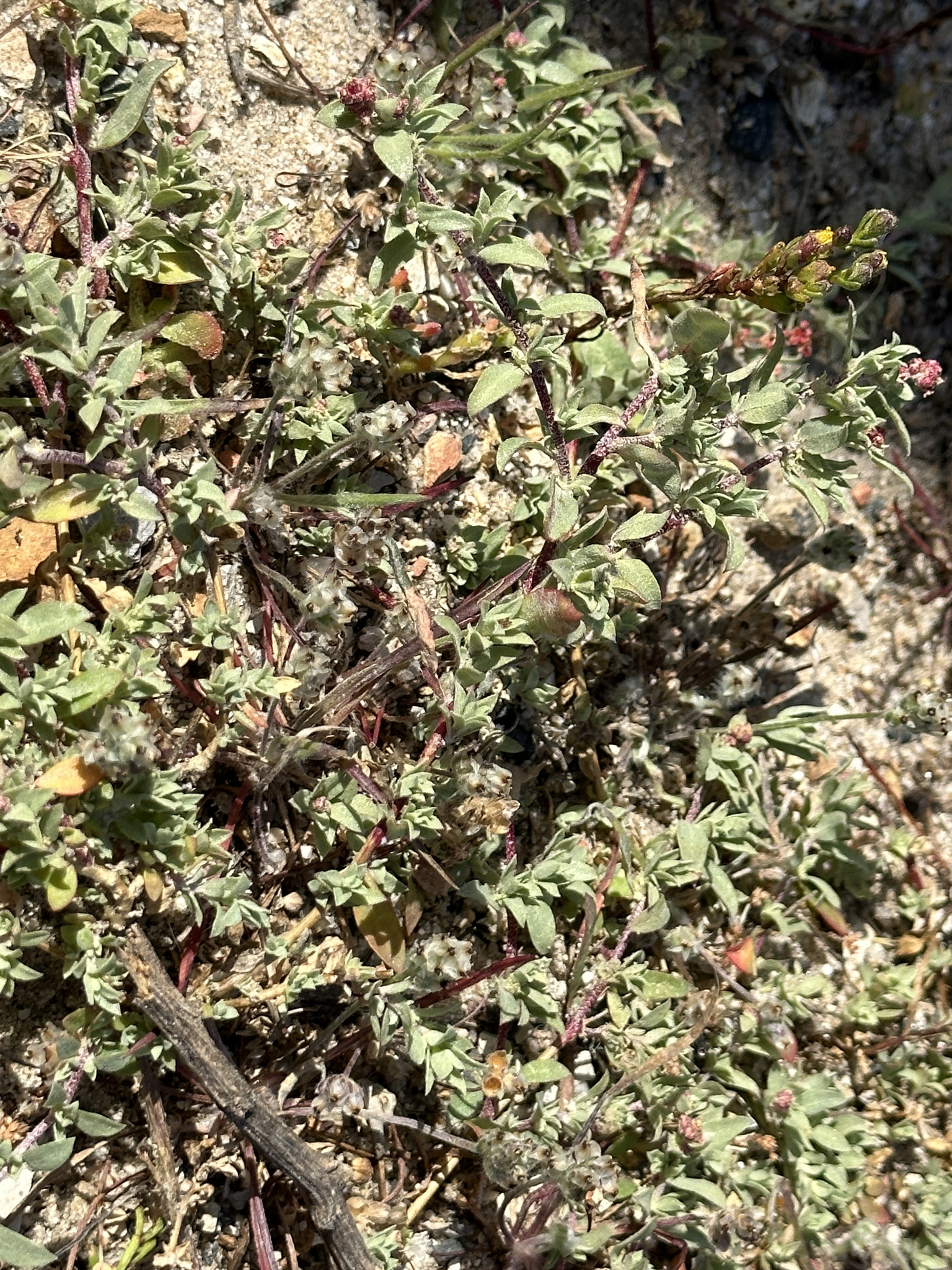

Scientific classification
- Kingdom: Plantae
- Clade: Tracheophytes
- Clade: Angiosperms
- Clade: Eudicots
- Order: Caryophyllales
- Family: Amaranthaceae
- Genus: Atriplex
- Species: A. coulteri

Binomial name
- Atriplex coulteri (Moq.) D.Dietr.

= Atriplex coulteri =

Species of flowering plant

Atriplex coulteri is a species of saltbush known by the common names Coulter's saltbush and Coulter's orache.

It is native to coastal southern California and northern Baja California, where it is quite rare. It grows in areas of saline and alkaline soils, such as ocean bluffs.

This is a perennial herb producing leaning or erect reddish green stems and branches generally under 50 centimeters tall. The gray scaly leaves are no bigger than 2 centimeters long and are oval in shape. The plant has male and female inflorescences which are small hard clusters of flowers. The brown seeds are under 2 millimeters wide.
