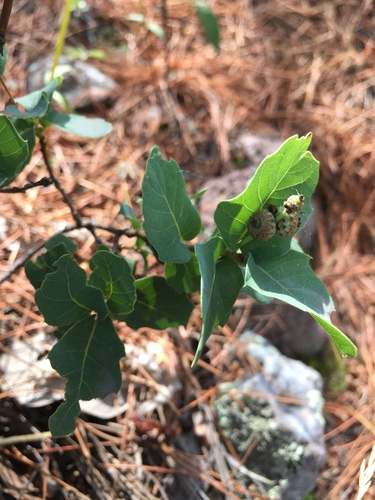

Conservation status
- Least Concern (IUCN 3.1)

Scientific classification
- Kingdom: Plantae
- Clade: Embryophytes
- Clade: Tracheophytes
- Clade: Spermatophytes
- Clade: Angiosperms
- Clade: Eudicots
- Clade: Rosids
- Order: Fagales
- Family: Fagaceae
- Genus: Quercus
- Subgenus: Quercus subg. Quercus
- Section: Quercus sect. Quercus
- Species: Q. depressipes

Binomial name
- Quercus depressipes Trel.

Synonyms
- Quercus bocoynensis C.H.Mull.; Quercus oblongifolia var. pallidinervis Trel.

= Quercus depressipes =

Species of oak tree

Quercus depressipes (known as depressed oak and Davis Mountain oak) is a species of plant in the family Fagaceae. It is found in North America, primarily Mexico and the United States.

== Description ==
Quercus depressipes is a type of live oak. It is a shrubby evergreen, growing only 1 meter (40 inches) tall, with leathery oval leaves. Its acorns are small, paired, measuring 0.7 to 1.5 centimetres (1/4 to 5/8 inch). The cap partially encloses the nut, covering one quarter to one half of the surface.

== Range ==
Quercus depressipes is found on mountainous grassy slopes, at elevations of 2,100–2,600 m (6,900–8,500 feet) above sea level. Its primary habitat is in the Mexican high deserts, in the states of Chihuahua, Durango, Nuevo León, and Zacatecas. In the United States, Q. depressipes has been found only in the Davis Mountains in western Texas, particularly on Mount Livermore.

Other oaks found in the Davis Mountains include the Emory oak (Quercus emoryi) and gray oak (Quercus grisea)

Biologists do not have enough information to determine whether Q. depressipes is thriving or threatened.
