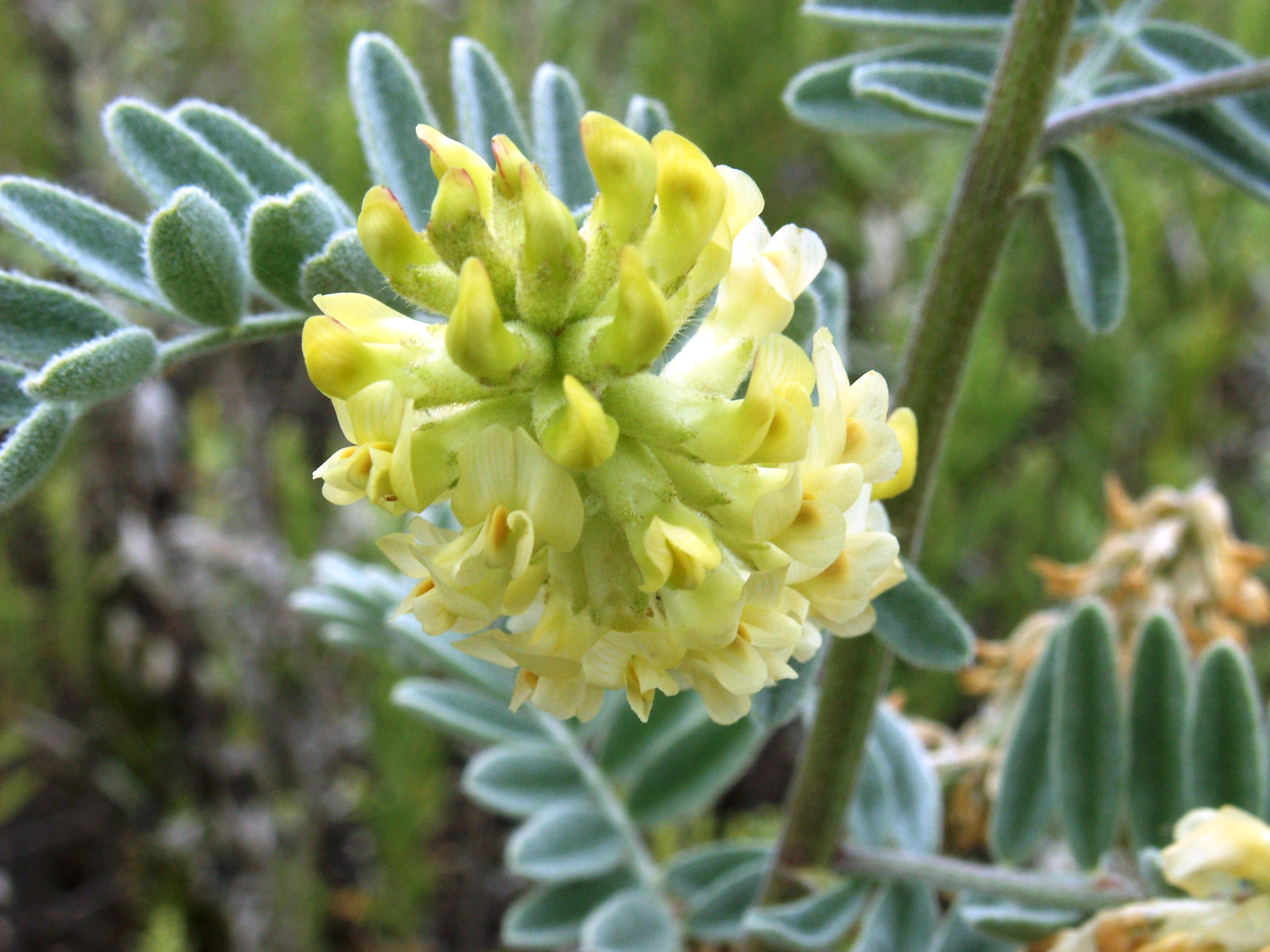

Conservation status
- Critically Imperiled (NatureServe)

Scientific classification
- Kingdom: Plantae
- Clade: Tracheophytes
- Clade: Angiosperms
- Clade: Eudicots
- Clade: Rosids
- Order: Fabales
- Family: Fabaceae
- Subfamily: Faboideae
- Genus: Astragalus
- Species: A. pycnostachyus
- Variety: A. p. var. lanosissimus

Trinomial name
- Astragalus pycnostachyus var. lanosissimus (Rydb.) Munz & McBurney ex Munz

Synonyms
- Phaca lanosissima Rydb. Tragacantha pycnostachya Kuntze

= Astragalus pycnostachyus var. lanosissimus =

Variety of legume

Astragalus pycnostachyus var. lanosissimus, the Ventura marsh milk-vetch, is a short-lived, herbaceous perennial in the pea family Fabaceae,

== Description ==
Astragalus pycnostachyus var. lanosissimus has dense clusters of small light yellow flowers. It has silvery white, pinnately compound leaves and flowers from June through October. The species was listed as endangered in 2001 by the U.S. Fish and Wildlife Service.

== Distribution ==
Historically, Astragalus pycnostachyus var. lanosissimus or Ventura marsh milk-vetch occurred in back dune habitat and coastal meadows, and near coastal salt marshes from Ventura County to Orange County. Over the last century seven historical occurrences were known to exist.

The species was extirpated from these sites and was therefore thought to be extinct until it was rediscovered in June 1997 by a USFWS biologist at a proposed development site. It had only been seen twice in the last century. Today, only this one population is known to exist near the City of Oxnard in Ventura County, all within a 2,854 square feet (265.1 m^{2}) area (less than 0.6 of an acre). The population occurs on disturbed coastal backdunes at the edge of the Oxnard Plain on fill material at a closed oil-waste dump site.

=== Conservation ===
Since 1997 between 192 and 374 individual plants have been observed on the site. Most of these individuals are seedlings or small juveniles. Southern California coastal wetland habitats have declined by 80–90% and those remaining are frequently degraded. Very little is known about the ecological requirements of this species.

This only known population of Ventura marsh milk-vetch is threatened by predation and potential habitat modification and may be susceptible to alterations in its hydrologic regime and competition from non-native plant species.

The California Department of Fish and Game (CDFG) (now California Department of Fish and Wildlife - CDFW) is working closely with the landowner, the USFWS and other interested parties to identify areas that may be suitable for introducing Ventura marsh milk-vetch as part of recovery for the species. Greenhouse studies on this species are ongoing, as well as research to learn more about the ecological requirements of this species.

In late 1998, David Magney, on behalf of the California Native Plant Society, submitted a petition to the California Fish and Game Commission to list the Ventura Marsh Milkvetch as an endangered species pursuant to the California Endangered Species Act. The petition was accepted as complete and the variety was formally listed as Endangered by the California Fish and Game Commission in 2000. It was subsequently formally listed by the USFWS as Endangered pursuant to the federal Endangered Species Act in 2001.
