= Cornelius Herman Muller =

American botanist (1909–1997)

- Born: July 22, 1909
- Died: January 26, 1997 (aged 87)
- Occupations: botanist and ecologist
- Known for: Pioneering the study of allelopathy and oak classification

Cornelius Herman ("Neil") Muller, born Müller, (July 22, 1909 – January 26, 1997) was an American botanist and ecologist who pioneered the study of allelopathy and oak classification.

== Personal life ==
Müller was born in Collinsville, Illinois, but moved at an early age to Cuero, Texas, and was educated there. He was graduated with a BA in botany from the University of Texas in 1932, and an MA from the same institution in 1933. He first married Mary Elizabeth Taylor, but they divorced in 1936; he changed his name to Muller in the following year.

After graduating from the University of Illinois in 1938 with a Ph.D. in botany, Muller worked for the Illinois Natural History Survey for one year and then for the US Department of Agriculture in various capacities from 1938 to 1945. Summers were usually spent on plant collecting trips to Mexico, the Southwest, and the southern United States. His work focused on vegetation studies in Texas and Mexico and most prominently on oaks. In 1939, Muller married Katherine Kinsel, also a botanist, who directed the Santa Barbara Botanic Garden from 1950 to 1973. She was a partner with her husband in much of his vegetation studies and oak collecting trips, sharing in the creation of the extensive field notes found in this collection. He and Katherine also collaborated on a publication about Jean-Louis Berlandier's plant collecting in Mexico in the 1820s. Muller died in Santa Barbara on January 26, 1997, at the age of 88.

== Professional career ==
Muller was recognized internationally for his knowledge on oaks. His dissertation was based in the plant ecology field, which led to him describing numerous new species and successfully writing 10 publications through his botanical explorations while he was still in graduate school and over 100 in his entire 87-year career.

From 1938 to 1942 Muller worked for the USDA Division of Plant Exploration and Introduction, naming and classifying plant specimens. As a result of this work, he published A Revision of the Genus Lycopersicon and The Central American Species of Quercus. During World War II, he worked for the Bureau of Plant Industry on the Special Guayule Research Project on a series of experiments on root development. His results were published in the USDA Technical Bulletin 923 entitled Root Development and Ecological Relations of Guayule. In 1945 he began teaching at the University of California, Santa Barbara (then known as Santa Barbara College). He helped develop the botany major in 1947 and taught various courses in botany and ecology until 1976 when he retired from UCSB. He continued in a teaching capacity as adjunct professor of botany at the University of Texas from 1974 to 1992.

His studies were executed to observe the factors that control plant distributions under the influence of chemical interaction. He's made substantial contributions to the field including his more prominent paper on "The Role of Chemical Inhibition in Vegetation Composition" in 1966, which paved the way for the study of allelopathy. The paper highlighted phytotoxic terpenes released by shrubs and their influence on the inhibition of seedling establishment. He highlighted the importance of the influence of these organisms that produce water-soluble toxins, which restrict herb development on ecosystem composition.
Muller founded UCSB's Herbarium in the early 1950s and was Curator from 1956 to 1964. In addition to his teaching duties during his years at UCSB, Muller conducted numerous research studies, funded partly by four National Science Foundation grants, on allelopathic mechanisms in California plant communities and systematics and evolution of the species Quercus. He published over 110 articles and books, peer-reviewed numerous articles and proposals, and supervised and worked with over 15 graduate students. He published two monographs: The Central American Species of Quercus and The Oaks of Texas as well as provided treatments for the genus in Arizona Flora, Flora of Panama, Manual of the Vascular Plants of Texas, and Flora North America.

Muller also made contributions to the study of oaks in taxonomic classifications. He published papers regarding the anatomy of oak species, their correlation with soil nature factors as well as their dispersals. He was one of the first to acknowledge hybridization of oaks and its effect on the relationship between species. He became leading authority on the genus Quercus. His focus on oaks continued for the rest of his career and led to the naming of new species. Throughout his career, Muller took collecting trips to Costa Rica, Cedros Island off of Baja California, Texas, Southern California, and Mexico, and went twice to Europe in the 1950s to study oak specimens at various herbaria. In the course of his years at UCSB, Muller deposited over 15,000 oak specimens in the UCSB Herbarium, including 90 type specimens.

In 1940 he published a new method for excavating root systems called the bisect-wash method. That is described as follows: "A smooth face of soil is cut through the plant axis vertically to sufficient breadth and depth to insure inclusion of the farthest ramifications of the root system in the plane of the bisection. Horizontal and perpendicular lines are marked off on this face with cord, the interval suited to the size of the root system. Then by means of a fine jet of water the soil is removed from the whole of the face of the bisection to a depth of one or two inches. The result is a bisection of the root system which may be drawn in detail. A second face perpendicular to the first gives a half bisection which may be used as a check against the first to insure a representative sample of the entire root system."

In 1939 he published a paper showing that warts or tumors on the bark of Celtis are probably initiated by mechanical injury. He wrote letters published in the American association for the advancement of science on common uses of plants for Christmas decoration, commenting on them as a fire hazard and the potential to have chemicals such as ammonium sulfate or calcium chloride absorbed through the cut and of the tree which can make the tree less flammable along with the method to do so. The other letter that was published was on mistletoe in legend and in science describing the various species that are called mistletoe and comments on the possibility of its use in the biblical story of its significance.

Ecology Seminar, the quarterly he founded has also been one of the longest lasting quarterlies in the states and continues to be offered.

== Awards and honors ==
Muller was named Faculty Research Lecturer in 1957, the third faculty member at UCSB to receive the title, honoring distinguished research achievement both locally and abroad. In 1975 Muller was honored for his work in ecology by being named Eminent Ecologist for 1975, a prestigious award given by the Ecological Society of America. He was also honored for his work in oak systematics by having two plants named after him: Quercus cornelius-mulleri and Quercus mulleri. The library at UCSB's Cheadle Center for Biodiversity and Ecological Restoration is named in his honor.
