= Quercus mangdenensis =

Conservation status
- Critically Endangered (IUCN 3.1)

Scientific classification
- Kingdom: Plantae
- Clade: Embryophytes
- Clade: Tracheophytes
- Clade: Angiosperms
- Clade: Eudicots
- Clade: Rosids
- Order: Fagales
- Family: Fagaceae
- Genus: Quercus
- Subgenus: Quercus subg. Cerris
- Section: Quercus sect. Cyclobalanopsis
- Species: Q. mangdenensis

Binomial name
- Quercus mangdenensis H.T.Binh & Ngoc

Species of flowering plant

Quercus mangdenensis is a species of oak. It is a tree endemic to Vietnam. It is an evergreen tree which grows 20–25 metres tall. It is known only from the town of Măng Đen, after which it is named, in Kon Plông district. It grows in montane evergreen rain forest from 1,050 to 1,200 metres elevation. It resembles Quercus bidoupensis and Quercus kontumensis.
