= Tetraserica konplong =

Scientific classification
- Kingdom: Animalia
- Phylum: Arthropoda
- Class: Insecta
- Order: Coleoptera
- Suborder: Polyphaga
- Infraorder: Scarabaeiformia
- Family: Scarabaeidae
- Genus: Tetraserica
- Species: T. konplong

Binomial name
- Tetraserica konplong Ahrens, Pacholátko & Pham, 2025

Species of beetle

Tetraserica konplong is a species of beetle of the family Scarabaeidae. It is found in Vietnam.

== Description ==
Adults reach a length of about 10.8–11.3 mm. The dorsal surface is dark reddish brown and glabrous. The pronotum has a weak greenish shine, the ventral surface and legs are reddish brown and the antennae are yellow.

== Etymology ==
The species is named after its occurrence in the Kon Plông district.
