= Kon Plông =

- Commune
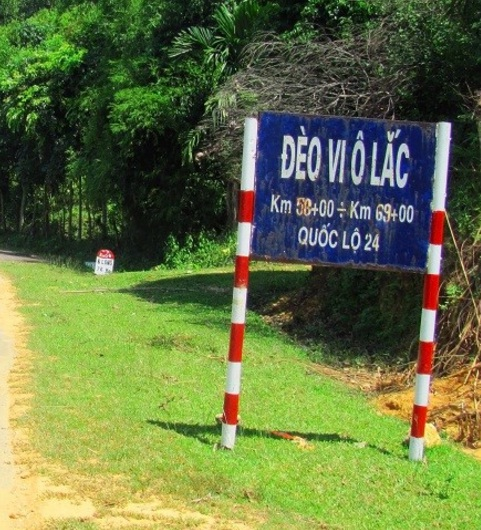
- Milestone at Violak Pass connecting Kon Plông commune with Ba Vì commune on National Route 24

- Location in Vietnam
- Coordinates: 14.653867518790083°N 108.43981296798113°E
- Country: Vietnam
- Region: South Central Coast and Central Highlands
- Province: Quảng Ngãi
- Established: 16 June 2025
- Administrative headquarters: Former Hiếu commune People's Committee office

Area
  - Total: 556.80 km^{2} (214.98 sq mi)

Population (31 December 2024)
  - Total: 9,334
  - Density: 16/km^{2} (41/sq mi)
- Website: konplong.quangngai.gov.vn

Kon Plông is a commune in Quảng Ngãi province, Vietnam.

On 16 June 2025, the Standing Committee of the National Assembly of Vietnam issued Resolution No. 1677/NQ-UBTVQH15 on the arrangement of commune-level administrative units in Quảng Ngãi province in 2025. Under the resolution, the entire area and population of Ngọk Tem, Hiếu, and Pờ Ê communes, formerly part of Kon Plông district, were merged to form a new commune named Kon Plông.
