= Măng Đen =

Coordinates: 14°36′1″N 108°17′27″E

Măng Đen commune Xã Măng Đen Đắk Long commune
- Commune
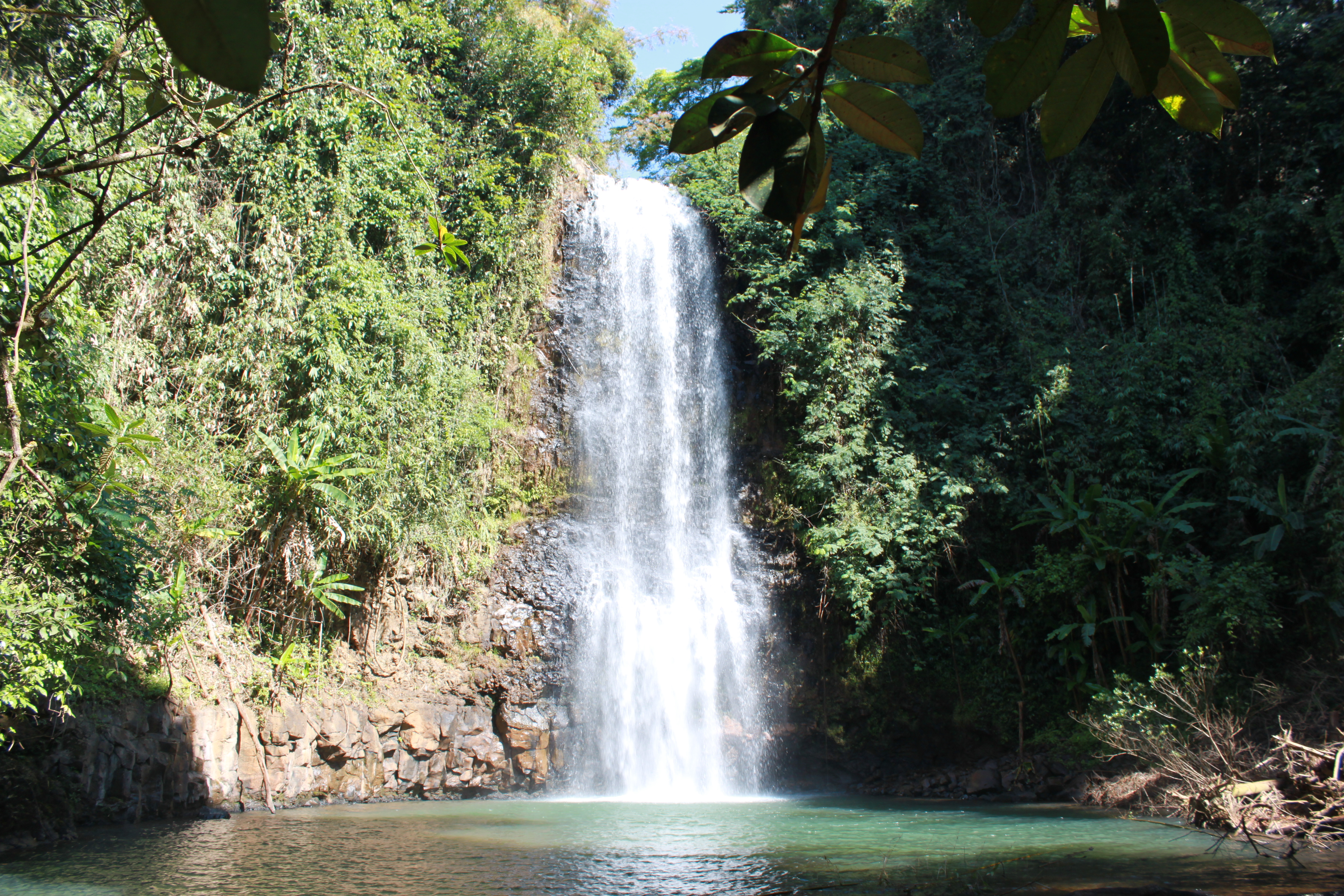
- View of Pa Sỹ Falls.
- Nickname: "Three Lakes and Seven Falls" (Ba hồ bảy thác)
- Motto: "Pink paradise" (Thiên đường hồng)
- Location within Vietnam
- Country: Vietnam
- Province: Quảng Ngãi
- Establishment: 16/06/2025
- Central hall: No.5, Phan Đình Phùng street

Government
  - Type: Municipality
  - People Committee's Chairman: Đặng Quang Hà
  - People Council's chairman: Đào Duy Khánh
  - Front Committee's chairman: A Reng
  - Party Committee's Secretary: Đào Duy Khánh

Area
  - Total: 396.93 km^{2} (153.26 sq mi)
- Elevation: 1,200 m (3,900 ft)

Population (31/12/2024)
  - Total: 9,438
  - Density: 23/km^{2} (60/sq mi)
- Time zone: UTC+7 (Indochina Time)
- ZIP code: 60000 (Note: An official code from 2023 to present.)
- Area code: 23473
- Website: mangden.quangngai.com.vn

Măng Đen (formerly Đắk Long commune) is a commune of Quảng Ngãi province in the Central Highlands of Vietnam.

== History ==
Măng Đen, formerly known as Măng Đeng was originally the Kinh phonetic transcription of T'măng-deeng [təː˨˩:maŋ˨˩:ɗɛŋ˧˥] in the M'nâm language, which means "the vast plain". (Note: It is similar as "bình địa" or "đồng bằng" in Kinh language.)

=== 20th century ===
Previously, Măng Đeng was part of Măng Cành commune, Kon Plông district, Kon Tum province. It is an area including : Măng Đeng village (the capital of Kon Plông rural district), Măng Đeng plateau, Măng Đeng stream... Under the regime of the Republic of Vietnam, Măng Đeng was militarized to become the headquarters ("Commanding and Coordinating Center for Military March", Trung-tâm chỉ-huy và phối-hợp hành-quân, or simply "Military March Center", Trung-tâm hành-quân) of the Free World Military Assistance Forces (FWMAF) in the Central Highlands. After the Sihanouk regime was overthrown in 1970, FULRO forces even unilaterally declared from Phnum Penh that Măng Đeng was the provisional capital of an independent Dagar government, but in reality, it still belonged to the South Vietnam's governance.

After the collapse of the Republic of Vietnam, Măng Đeng was changed to Măng Đen in the administrative documents of the new government. This has caused many misunderstandings, because măng đen means "the black bamboo shoot" in Kinh language. Many textbooks teaching national language for ethnic minorities have sometimes explained that this locality has many black bamboo shoots, so it has such a name.

During the 1970s until 1992, Măng Đen was one of the hot spots (khu vực nổi cộm) on security and defense by the harassment of FULRO groups. The most typical were two raids in 1984 and 1986–7, causing many Kinh police and civilians to casualties. That is the cause of the poverty of this area for many years.

=== 21st century ===
On January 8, 2004, the Government of Vietnam issued the Decree 13/2004/NĐ-CP. Accordingly, establishing Đắk Long commune (xã Đắk Long, means "the big stream" in M'nâm language) on the basis of 13,555 ha of natural area and 2,054 people of Măng Cành commune.

On July 16, 2019, the National Assembly Standing Committee issued the Resolution 720/NQ-UBTVQH14, which took effect from September 1, 2019. Accordingly, establishing Măng Đen township (thị trấn Măng Đen) on the basis of 148,07 km^{2} of natural area and 6,913 people of Đắk Long commune.

During the COVID-19 pandemic, Măng Đen was continuously advertised in the Vietnamese mass media as a safe destination (điểm-đến an-toàn) for tourists, who liked to experience the feeling of being in harmony with the fresh nature. Some newspapers even called Măng Đen as "the second Dalat" (Đà Lạt thứ hai). However, it is all aiming to stimulate eco-tourism in one of the poorest localities in the Central Highlands.

Deputy Prime Minister Trần Hồng Hà signed the Decision 1492/QĐ-TTg on November 29, 2023, to approve Overall planning task of building Măng Đen Tourist Resort, Kon Plông district, Kon Tum province until 2045. Under that project, Măng Đen will be meticulously planned to become a large-scale eco-tourism area in Southeast Asia, which complies with forestry laws and guidelines for climate change. Therefore, starting in 2023, the Kon Tum Provincial People's Committee has approved a planning project called as Măng-Đen National Ecotourism Area (Khu Du-lịch Sinh-thái Quốc-gia Măng-Đen). Accordingly, the entire area of the township will be "frozen" (đóng băng) into a non-industrial zone to preserve the original ecosystem, thereby turning Măng Đen into a unique biosphere reserve of the whole country.

On the morning of April 15, 2025, at the headquarters of the Kon Plông Rural District People's Committee in Măng Đen, a historic conference took place, which was widely announced on the 12th by the Quảng Ngãi Provincial People's Committee, (Note: Ban Chỉ Đạo về tổng kết Nghị Quyết 18 và triển khai thực hiện Kết Luận 137 của Bộ Chính Trị về Đề án sắp xếp, tổ chức lại đơn vị hành chính các cấp và xây dựng mô hình tổ chức chính quyền địa phương hai cấp.) to proceed to officially merge the two provinces Kon Tum and Quảng Ngãi.

== Geography ==
=== Topography ===
Currently, the area of Măng Đen Township is divided into these villages (Thôn): Măng Đen, Đăk Long, Đăk Ke, Kon Plông, Kon Pring, Kon Vơng Kia, Kon Chốt, Kon Brayh, Kon Xủh, Kon Leang, Vi Ring, Vi Xây, Đắk Tăng, Rô Xia, Vi Rơ Ngheo, Đắk Pờ Rồ, Kon Du, Măng Pành, Măng Cành, Đắk Ne, Kon Kum, Kon Chênh, Kon Năng, Kon Tu Ma, Kon Tu Răng.

Măng Đen is a newly-formed town on the sparsely populated Măng Đen Plateau in the Northern part of the Central Highlands region. The town was built in 2003 around the M'nâm villages of Dak Ke and Kon Bring and an abandoned American airfield called Plateau G.I. The settlement received township status in 2019.

The territory of Măng Đen Township is located on National Route 24. It has a hot and humid climate all year round. It is located on basalt land created by the movement of ancient volcanoes.

The Central Highlands enters the rainy season from May to September. The region often has dense fog.

At 1,200 metres (3,900 ft) above sea level, the township has cool climate with average temperatures of 17.0–22.7 °C (62.6–72.9 °F). Măng Đen's specific sights are pine forests and wild Himalayan cherry blossom in the winter. It is dubbed as "the second Da Lat" due to its temperate climate.

=== Demography ===
Măng Đen is the only administrative unit in Kon Tum province that Kinh people dominate the majority. M'nâm people have left most of the decades ago because of the difficulty of agricultural conditions. They only have a small number in the township nowadays. In addition, other ethnic groups only have almost negligible quantities.

The most popular religion in Măng Đen is the Roman Catholic Church, besides a small number of people who believe in atheist theory.

== Culture ==
In the early 2020s, when Măng Đen tourism became a hot trend in Vietnamese GenZ community, many young people approached this place in the poetic perspective. Writer Nguyễn Nhật Ánh relied on this trend to imagine the story of a space travel center located in Măng Đen, where suddenly became the attack target of UFOs.

=== Tourism ===
During the Vietnam War, there was a small airport built in a hurry by American soldiers to make a response for helicopters. According to the document of the Bishopric of Kontum, the Mangdeng Chapel was built in 1971 as a place for the ceremony for local people and American soldiers. According to Bishop Joseph Nguyễn Minh Kông's report on July 3, 2011, he himself took the statue of Our Lady of Fatima on the helicopter to place in front of the chapel's door. However, the statue position was less than 2 kilometres from the airport, so it randomly became the target of the North Vietnamese artillery in 1974. The chapel was hit by big bullets so it was abandoned without any recovery plan, while the fate of the statue was not interested.

Over the years since the artillery, the area of the chapel and the airport has become a jungle. That area sometimes became a forestry, sometimes planned to build roads, but the statue was still in the position with erosion over time. The hands of Our Lady were broken for an unknown cause, but all the efforts were unsuccessful. That is why the statue was also known as Our Lady Without A Hand (Thánh Mẫu cụt tay).

At the end of August 2006, a Christian discovered the existence of the statue, so he immediately submitted to the Bishopric of Kon Tum. On December 28, 2006, a delegation led by Bishop of Kon Tum Micae Hoàng Đức Oanh visited the statue. A year later, on December 9, 2007, Bishop Oanh and priests, monasticists, and more than 2,000 civilians offered Mass to respect Our Lady of Măng Đen. Since then, this place has become a pilgrimage of parishioners in the Central Highlands and December 9 every year becomes the pilgrimage day for Our Lady of Mangdeng (Lễ triều-cận Đức Thánh-Mẫu Măng-Đeng) at the Archdiocese of Kon Tum.

Currently, the Kon Tum Archdiocese has maintained an office called as Pilgrimage Center Named Our Lady of Mangdeng to coordinate religious activities every day. The current shepherd is Bishop Joan-Baptista Hồ Quang Huyên, who took this parish on September 7, 2024.

== Economy ==
Around the early 20th century, some French engineers went to Măng Đeng Plateau to survey and started planting pine trees with the intention of turning this area into a high-class resort similar to Dalat. But for some reason, the project failed.

Măng Đen's identity is formed very late and mainly based on two groups of people : Kinh (majority) and M'nâm. Since 2023, the mascots known to the township are coffee and goats. They are originally strategic items of the local economy. In particular, Café Măng Đen has been registered as a national brand since 2024.

Although Măng Đen is considered a land with great potential for tourism, but because of force majeure reasons, this locality has not been exploited for decades. But since the policy of promoting non-industrial economy, Măng Đen has suddenly become a "fertile" land for real estate speculators.

== See also ==
- Kon Ka Kinh National Park
