= Quercus bidoupensis =

Conservation status
- Critically Endangered (IUCN 3.1)

Scientific classification
- Kingdom: Plantae
- Clade: Embryophytes
- Clade: Tracheophytes
- Clade: Spermatophytes
- Clade: Angiosperms
- Clade: Eudicots
- Clade: Rosids
- Order: Fagales
- Family: Fagaceae
- Genus: Quercus
- Species: Q. bidoupensis

Binomial name
- Quercus bidoupensis H.T.Binh & Ngoc

Species of flowering plant

Quercus bidoupensis is a species of oak. It is a tree endemic to Vietnam. It is known only from its type locality in Bidoup-Nui Ba National Park in Lam Dong Province, where it grows in montane evergreen rain forest dominated by species of Fagaceae at 1,698 metres elevation.

The species was described by Hoang Thi Binh and Nguyen Van Ngoc in 2018.
