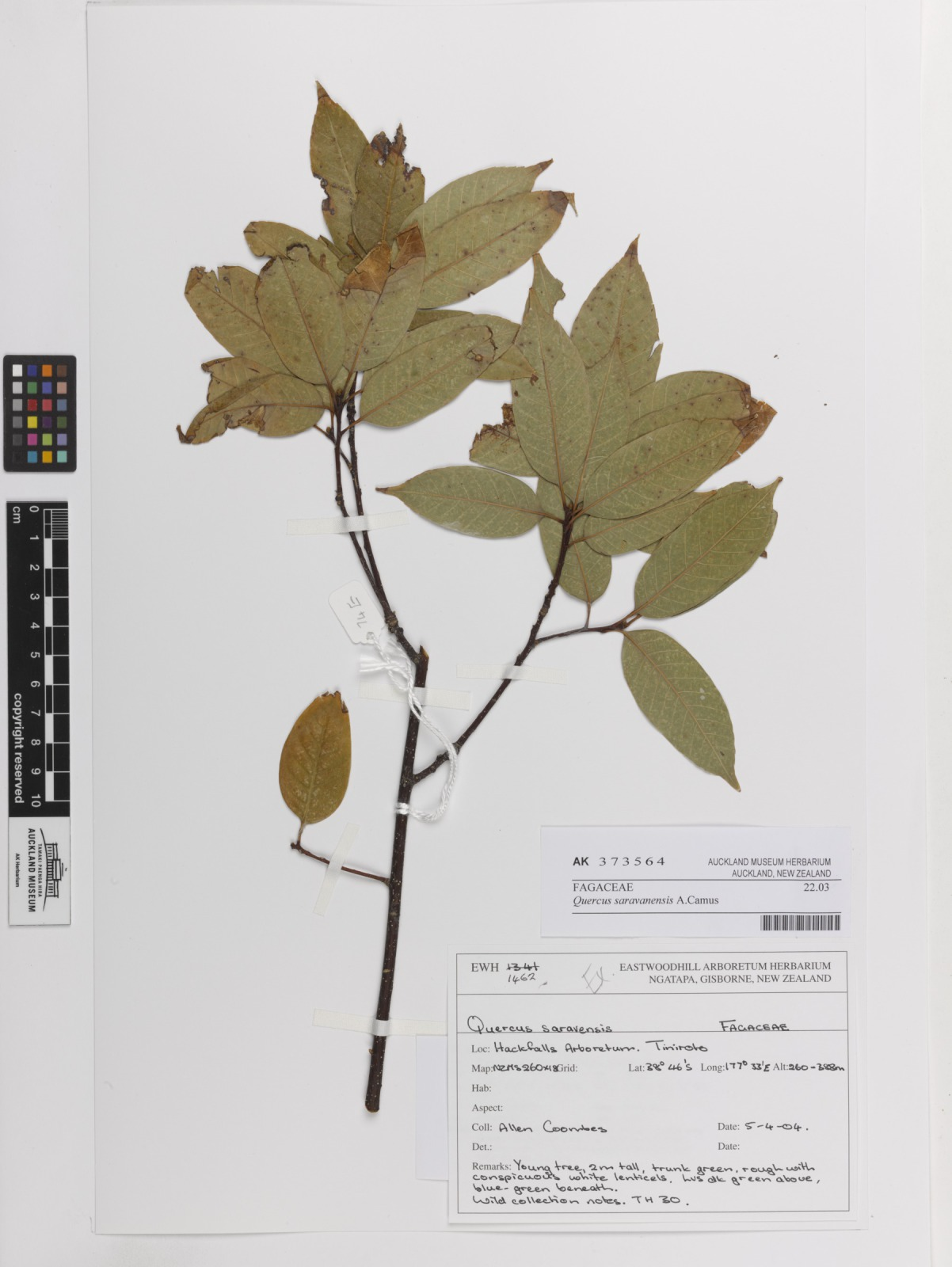

Conservation status
- Data Deficient (IUCN 3.1)

Scientific classification
- Kingdom: Plantae
- Clade: Embryophytes
- Clade: Tracheophytes
- Clade: Spermatophytes
- Clade: Angiosperms
- Clade: Eudicots
- Clade: Rosids
- Order: Fagales
- Family: Fagaceae
- Genus: Quercus
- Subgenus: Quercus subg. Cerris
- Section: Quercus sect. Cyclobalanopsis
- Species: Q. saravanensis

Binomial name
- Quercus saravanensis A.Camus

Synonyms
- Cyclobalanopsis kontumensis (A.Camus) Y.C.Hsu & H.Wei Jen; Cyclobalanopsis saravanensis (A.Camus) Hjelmq.; Quercus kontumensis A.Camus

= Quercus saravanensis =

Species of oak tree

Quercus saravanensis is an Asian species of tree in the beech family Fagaceae. It has been found in northern Indochina (Laos + Vietnam), and also in the Province of Yunnan in southwestern China. It is placed in subgenus Cerris, section Cyclobalanopsis.

Quercus saravanensis is a large tree up to 50 m tall. Twigs are hairless. Leaves can be as much as 140 mm long, thin and papery. The acorn is ellipsoid, 15-20 × 15-20 mm, glabrous; the scar is approx. 8 mm in diameter.
