= Kon Plông district =

Coordinates: 14.750°N 108.333°E

Kon Plông district Huyện Kon Plông
- District
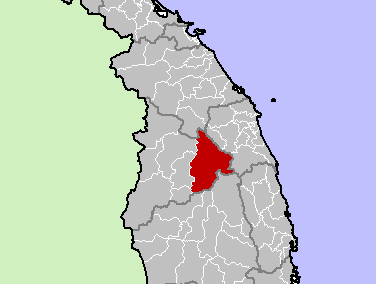
- Location in Kon Tum province
- Country: Vietnam
- Province: Kon Tum province
- Capital: Măng Đen

Area
  - Total: 526 sq mi (1,362 km^{2})

Population (2003)
  - Total: 31,700
- Time zone: UTC+7 (Indochina Time)

Kon Plông is a former rural district (huyện) of Kon Tum province in the Central Highlands region of Vietnam. It covers an area of 2,248.2 km² and in 1999 had a population of 31,700 people. The district capital lies at Măng Đen.

== Divisions ==
Kon Plông district was formed on the basis of division separating the old district of Kon Plông into Kon Rẫy district and the new Kon Plông district. Kon Plông district was divided in 2019 into 1 township and 8 communes, including:

- Măng Đen township (former Đăk Long commune)
- Măng Bút
- Măng Cành
- Ngọc Tem
- Đăk Rinh
- Đăk Nên
- Đăk Tăng
- Xã Hiếu
- Pờ Ê

As of 2003 the district had a population of 18,554. The district covers an area of 1,362 km^{2} (526 sq mi).
