= Quercus handeliana =

Scientific classification
- Kingdom: Plantae
- Clade: Embryophytes
- Clade: Tracheophytes
- Clade: Angiosperms
- Clade: Eudicots
- Clade: Rosids
- Order: Fagales
- Family: Fagaceae
- Genus: Quercus
- Subgenus: Quercus subg. Cerris
- Section: Quercus sect. Ilex
- Species: Q. handeliana

Binomial name
- Quercus handeliana A.Camus

Synonyms
- Quercus parvifolia Hand.-Mazz. (1925), non Benth. ex Ettingsh. (1852), fossil name.

Species of flowering plant

Quercus handeliana is a species of oak. It is a tree endemic to Yunnan Province in south-central China.

The species was first described by Aimée Antoinette Camus in 1933. Some authorities consider it a synonym of Quercus acrodonta.
