= Quercus acrodonta =

Conservation status
- Least Concern (IUCN 3.1)

Scientific classification
- Kingdom: Plantae
- Clade: Embryophytes
- Clade: Tracheophytes
- Clade: Spermatophytes
- Clade: Angiosperms
- Clade: Eudicots
- Clade: Rosids
- Order: Fagales
- Family: Fagaceae
- Genus: Quercus
- Subgenus: Quercus subg. Cerris
- Section: Quercus sect. Ilex
- Species: Q. acrodonta

Binomial name
- Quercus acrodonta Seemen

Synonyms
- Quercus ilex var. acrodonta (Seemen) Skan

Species of flowering plant

Quercus acrodonta is a species of flowering plant in the oak genus Quercus, family Fagaceae, native to central and southern China. It is typically found growing in valleys and on mountains 300 to 2,300 m (1,000 to 7,500 ft) above sea level. It is an evergreen tree, occasionally a shrub, reaching 15 m (50 ft), most of its structures are covered in a tomentose yellowish-gray layer. It is placed in section Ilex.
