= List of Magnolia species =

The genus Magnolia s.l. has been divided in three subgenera, 12 sections, and 13 subsections. The list below is divided according to the Magnolia Society's 2012 classification.

== Subgenus Magnolia ==
Anthers open by splitting at the front facing the centre of the flower, deciduous or evergreen, flowers produced after the leaves.

=== Section Magnolia ===
- Magnolia faustinomirandae A.Vázquez - (Mexico)
- Magnolia grandiflora L. - (SE US) — southern magnolia
- Magnolia guatemalensis Donn. Sm. - (Guatemala, Honduras, El Salvador)
  - Magnolia guatemalensis subsp. guatemalensis (Guatemala)
  - Magnolia guatemalensis subsp. hondurensis (Molina) Vazquez (Honduras, El Salvador)
- Magnolia guerrerensis J.Jiménez Ram., K.Vega & Cruz Durán (Mexico)
- Magnolia iltisiana Vazquez (W Mexico)
- Magnolia krusei J.Jiménez Ram. & Cruz Durán (Mexico)
- Magnolia oaxacensis A.Vázquez (Mexico)
- Magnolia pacifica Vazquez (W Mexico)
  - Magnolia pacifica subsp. pacifica (W Mexico)
  - Magnolia pacifica subsp. pugana Iltis & Vazquez (W Mexico)
- Magnolia panamensis Vazquez & Iltis (Panama)
- Magnolia pedrazae A.Vázquez (Mexico)
- Magnolia poasana (Pittier) Dandy (Costa Rica, Panama)
- Magnolia poqomchi M.J.Serrano & A.Vázquez (Guatemala)
- Magnolia schiedeana Schltdl. (E Mexico)
- Magnolia sharpii Meranda (Chiapas (Mexico))
- Magnolia sororum Seibert (Costa Rica, Panama)
  - Magnolia sororum subsp. lutea Vazquez. (Costa Rica, Panama)
  - Magnolia sororum subsp. sororum (Panama)
- Magnolia tamaulipana Vazquez - Mexican evergreen magnolia (NE Mexico)
- Magnolia tarahumara (Vazquez) A.Vázquez (W Mexico)
- Magnolia vazquezii Cruz Durán & K.Vega (Mexico)
- Magnolia virginiana L. (SE US) — Sweetbay Magnolia
- Magnolia yoroconte Dandy (Guatemala, Honduras, Belize)
- Magnolia zamudioi A.Vázquez (Mexico)

=== Section Gwillimia ===
==== Subsection Gwillimia ====
- Magnolia albosericea Chun & Tsoong. (Hainan (China))
- Magnolia bawangensis Law, R.Z.Zhou & D.M.Liu (Hainan (China))
- Magnolia championii Benth (S & SE China)
- Magnolia clemensiorum Dandy (Vietnam)
- Magnolia coco (Lour.) DC. (SE China)
- Magnolia delavayi Franchet (Yunnan (China))
- Magnolia fistulosa (Finet & Gagnep.) Dandy (SE Yunnan (China))
- Magnolia henryi Dunn (Yunnan (China))
- Magnolia nana Dandy (Vietnam)
- Magnolia odoratissima Law et Zhou (S China)
- Magnolia pterocarpa Roxb. (Nepal, Burma)
- Magnolia xiana Noot. (China)

==== Subsection Blumiana ====
- Magnolia angatensis Blanco (Philippines)
- Magnolia betongensis (Craib) H.Keng (Borneo)
- Magnolia gigantifolia (Miq.) Noot. (Borneo, Sumatra)
- Magnolia hodgsonii (Hook.f. & Thom.) H.Keng (Nepal, Burma)
- Magnolia lasia Noot. (Borneo)
- Magnolia liliifera (L.) Baillon (SE Asia, Borneo, Philippines, Singapore, Sumatra)
  - Magnolia liliifera var. angatensis (Blanco) Noot. (Philippines)
  - Magnolia liliifera var. beccarii (Ridley) Noot. (Borneo)
  - Magnolia liliifera var. liliifera (SE Asia)
  - Magnolia liliifera var. obovata (Korth.) Govaerts (Borneo)
  - Magnolia liliifera var. singapurensis (Ridley) Noot. (Singapore, Sumatra)
- Magnolia mariusjacobsia Noot. (Borneo)
- Magnolia persuaveolens Dandy (Borneo)
  - Magnolia persuaveolens subsp. persuaveolens (Borneo)
  - Magnolia persuaveolens subsp. rigida Noot. (Borneo)
- Magnolia rabaniana Hook.f. & Thomson D.C.S.Raju & M.P.Nayer (India)
- Magnolia sarawakensis (Agostini) Noot. (Borneo)
- Magnolia singapurensis (Ridl.) H.Keng (Singapore, Sumatra)
- Magnolia villosa (Miq.) H.Keng (Sumatra, Borneo)

=== Section Talauma ===
==== Subsection Talauma ====
- Magnolia allenii Standl. (Panama)
- Magnolia amazonica (Ducke) Govaerts (Brazil, Peru)
- Magnolia arcabucoana (Lozano) Govaerts (Colombia)
- Magnolia bankardiorum M.O.Dillon & Sánchez Vega (Peru)
- Magnolia boliviana (M.Nee) Govaerts (Bolivia)
- Magnolia canandeana F. Arroyo (Ecuador)
- Magnolia caricifragrans (Lozano) Govaerts (Colombia)
- Magnolia cespedesii (Triana & Planch) Govaerts (Colombia)
- Magnolia chocoensis (Lozano) Govaerts (Colombia)
- Magnolia clementinana F. Arroyo & M.Serna (Peru)
- Magnolia coronata M.Serna, C.Velásquez & Cogollo (Colombia)
- Magnolia dixonii (Little) Govaerts (Ecuador)
- Magnolia dodecapetala (Lam.) Govaerts (Lesser Antilles)
- Magnolia espinalii (Lozano) Govaerts (Colombia)
- Magnolia georgii (Lozano) Govaerts (Colombia)
- Magnolia gilbertoi (Lozano) Govaerts (Colombia)
- Magnolia gloriensis (Pittier) Govaerts (Central America)
- Magnolia henaoi (Lozano) Govaerts (Colombia)
- Magnolia hernandezii (Lozano) Govaerts (Colombia)
- Magnolia irwiniana (Lozano) Govaerts (Brazil)
- Magnolia jardinensis M.Serna, C.Velásquez & Cogollo (Colombia)
- Magnolia juninensis F. Arroyo (Peru)
- Magnolia katiorum (Lozano) Govaerts (Colombia)
- Magnolia lacandonica Vazquez-Garcia, Perez-Farrera, Martinez-Camilo, Muniz-Castro & Martinez-Melendez (Mexico)
- Magnolia manguillo Marcelo-Peña & F. Arroyo (Peru)
- Magnolia mexicana DC. (Mexico)
- Magnolia minor (Urb.) Govaerts (Cuba)
- Magnolia morii (Lozano) Govaerts (Panama)
- Magnolia narinensis (Lozano) Govaerts (Colombia)
- Magnolia neillii (Lozano) Govaerts (Ecuador)
- Magnolia ovata (A.St.-Hil.) Spreng. (Brazil)
- Magnolia palandana F. Arroyo (Ecuador)
- Magnolia pastazaensis F. Arroyo & A.J. Pérez (Ecuador)
- Magnolia polyhypsophylla (Lozano) Govaerts (Colombia)
- Magnolia quetzal Vazquez-Garcia, Veliz-Perez, Triboullier-Navas & Muniz-Castro (Guatemala)
- Magnolia rimachii (Lozano) Govaerts (Peru, Ecuador)
- Magnolia sambuensis (Pittier) Govaerts (Panama, Colombia)
- Magnolia santanderiana (Lozano) Govaerts (Colombia)
- Magnolia sellowiana (A.St.-Hil.) Govaerts (Brazil)
- Magnolia silvioi (Lozano) Govaerts (Colombia)
- Magnolia venezuelensis (Lozano) Govaerts (Venezuela)
- Magnolia virolinensis (Lozano) Govaerts (Colombia)
- Magnolia wolfii (Lozano) Govaerts (Colombia)

==== Subsection Dugandiodendron ====
- Magnolia argyrothricha (Lozano) Govaerts (Colombia)
- Magnolia calimaensis (Lozano) Govaerts (Colombia)
- Magnolia calophylla (Lozano) Govaerts (Colombia)
- Magnolia cararensis (Lozano) Govaerts (Colombia)
- Magnolia chimantensis Steyermark & Maguire – "Chimanta magnolia" (Venezuela)
- Magnolia colombiana (Little) Govaerts (Colombia)
- Magnolia guatapensis (Lozano) Govaerts (Colombia)
- Magnolia jaenensis Marcelo-Peña (Peru)
- Magnolia lenticellata (Lozano) Govaerts (Colombia)
- Magnolia magnifolia (Lozano) Govaerts (Colombia)
- Magnolia mahechae (Lozano) Govaerts (Colombia)
- Magnolia ptaritepuiana Steyermark – "ptari-tepui magnolia" (Venezuela)
- Magnolia striatifolia Little (Colombia, Ecuador)
- Magnolia urraoense (Lozano) Govaerts (Colombia)
- Magnolia yantzazana F. Arroyo (Ecuador)
- Magnolia yarumalense (Lozano) Govaerts (Colombia)

==== Subsection Cubenses ====
- Magnolia cristalensis Bisse (Cuba)
- Magnolia cubensis Urb. (Cuba)
- Magnolia domingensis Urb. (Haiti, Dominican Rep.)
- Magnolia ekmannii Urb. (Haiti)
- Magnolia emarginata Urb. & Ekman (Haiti)
- Magnolia hamorii Howard (Dominican Rep.)
- Magnolia pallescens Urb. & Ekman (Dom. Rep.)
- Magnolia portoricensis Bello (Puerto Rico)
- Magnolia splendens Urban (Puerto Rico)

=== Section Manglietia ===
- Magnolia aromatica (Dandy) V.S.Kumar (S China)
- Magnolia blaoensis (Gagnep.) Dandy (Vietnam)
- Magnolia calophylloides Figlar & Noot. (W Sumatra)
- Magnolia caveana (Hook.f. & Thoms.) D.C.Raju & M.P.Nayer (Assam, N Burma)
- Magnolia changhuntana Noot. (Guangdong (China))
- Magnolia chevalieri (Dandy) V.S.Kumar (Vietnam, Laos)
- Magnolia conifera (Dandy) V.S.Kumar (SE China, Vietnam)
  - Magnolia conifera var. chingii (Dandy) V.S.Kumar (SE China)
  - Magnolia conifera var. conifera (SE China, Vietnam)
- Magnolia crassipes (Y.W.Law) V.S.Kumar (Guangdong (China))
- Magnolia dandyi (Gapnep.) Dandy (S China, Vietnam, Laos)
- Magnolia decidua (Q.Y.Zheng) V.S.Kumar (Jiangxi (China))
- Magnolia duclouxii Finet & Gagnep. (Vietnam, SW China)
- Magnolia figlarii V.S.Kumar (Sichuan (China))
- Magnolia fordiana (Oliv.) Hu (Vietnam, S China)
  - Magnolia fordiana var. calcarea (X.H.Song) Chen & Noot. (Guizhou (China))
  - Magnolia fordiana var. fordiana (Vietnam, S China)
  - Magnolia fordiana var. forrestii (W.W.Sm. Ex Dandy) Chen & Noot. (SW China)
  - Magnolia fordiana var. kwangtungensis (Merr.) Chen & Noot. (SE China)
- Magnolia garrettii (Craib) V.S.Kumar (SW China, Vietnam, Thailand)
- Magnolia grandis (Hu & W.C.Cheng) V.S.Kumar (Yunnan (China))
- Magnolia hongheensis (Y.M.Shui & W.H.Chen) V.S.Kumar (Yunnan (China))
- Magnolia hookeri Cubitt & W.W.Sm. (SW China, N Burma, Thailand)
- Magnolia insignis (Wall.) Blume (S China, Nepal, Burma)
- Magnolia kwangtungensis Merr. (SE China)
- Magnolia lanuginosoides Figlar & Noot. (Sumatra)
- Magnolia longipedunculata (Q.W.Zeng & Law) V.S.Kumar (Guangdong (China))
- Magnolia lucida (B.L. Chen & S.C. Yang) V.S. Kumar (SW China)
- Magnolia obovalifolia (C.Y.Yu & Law) V.S.Kumar (Yunnan (China))
- Magnolia ovoidea (H.T.Chang & B.L.Chen) V.S.Kumar (Yunnan (China))
- Magnolia patungensis (Hu) Noot. (China)
- Magnolia rufibarbata (Dandy) V.S. Kumar (Yunnan (China), Vietnam)
- Magnolia sabahensis (Dandy ex Noot.) Figlar & Noot. (Borneo)
- Magnolia sapaensis (N.H.Xia & Q.N.Vu) Grimshaw & Macer (Vietnam)
- Magnolia sumatrana (Miq.) Figlar & Noot. (2011) (Sumatra, Java, Lesser Sunda Islands, Sulawesi)
  - Magnolia sumatrana var. glauca (Blume) Figlar & Noot. (Sumatra, Java, Lesser Sunda Is, Sulawesi)
  - Magnolia sumatrana var. sumatrana (W Sumatra)
- Magnolia utilis (Dandy) V.S.Kumar (N Burma, Thailand)
- Magnolia ventii (N.V.Tiep) V.S.Kumar (Yunnan (China))
- Magnolia xinganensis Noot. (Guangxi (China))
- Magnolia yuyuanensis (Y.W.Law) V.S.Kumar (E China)
- Magnolia zhengyiana (N.H.Xia) Noot. (Yunnan (China))

=== Section Kmeria ===
- Magnolia duperreana Pierre (Vietnam, Cambodia)
- Magnolia kwangsiensis Figlar & Noot. (Yunnan, Guangxi (China))
- Magnolia thailandica Noot. & Chalermglin (Thailand)

=== Section Rhytidospermum ===
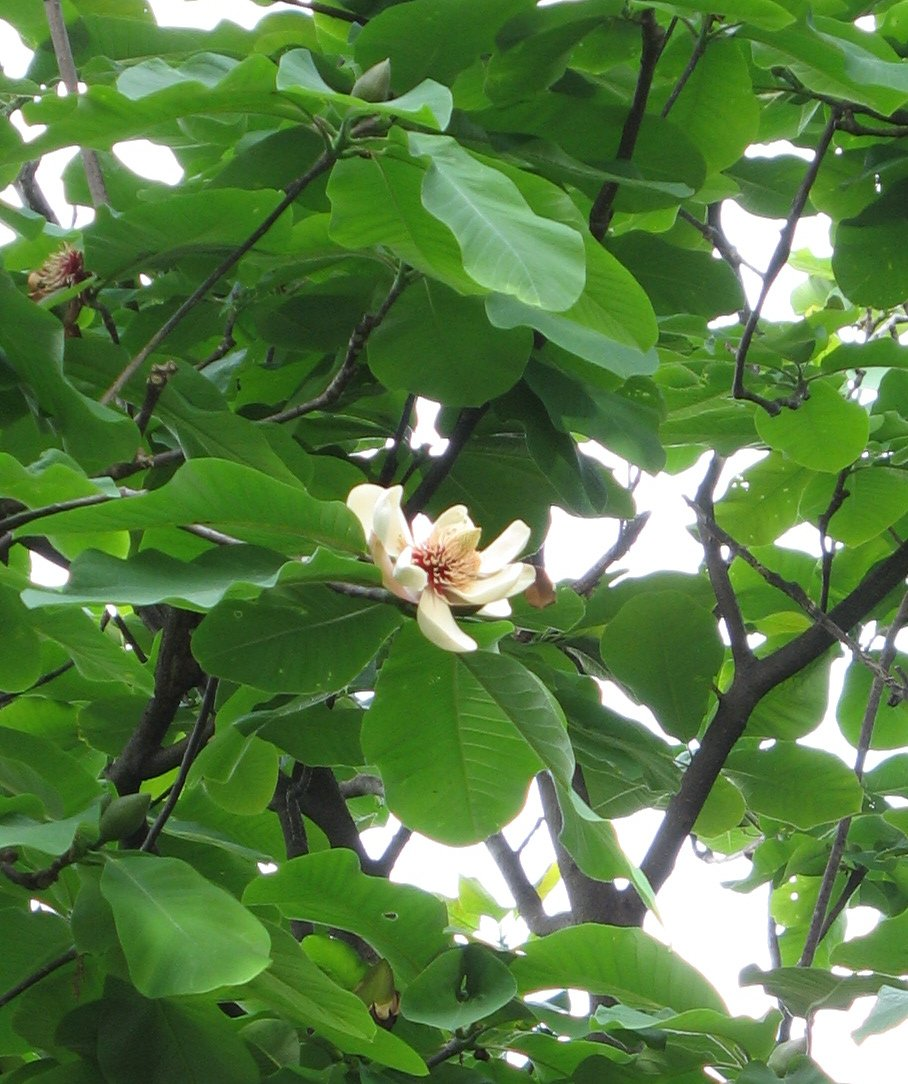
M. obovata

==== Subsection Rhytidospermum ====
- Magnolia obovata Thunb. (Japan)
- Magnolia officinalis Rehd. & Wilson (W China)
  - Magnolia officinalis subsp. biloba Cheng & Law (E China)
  - Magnolia officinalis subsp. officinalis (E China)
- Magnolia rostrata W.W.Smith (SW China)
- Magnolia tripetala (L.) L. (SE US)

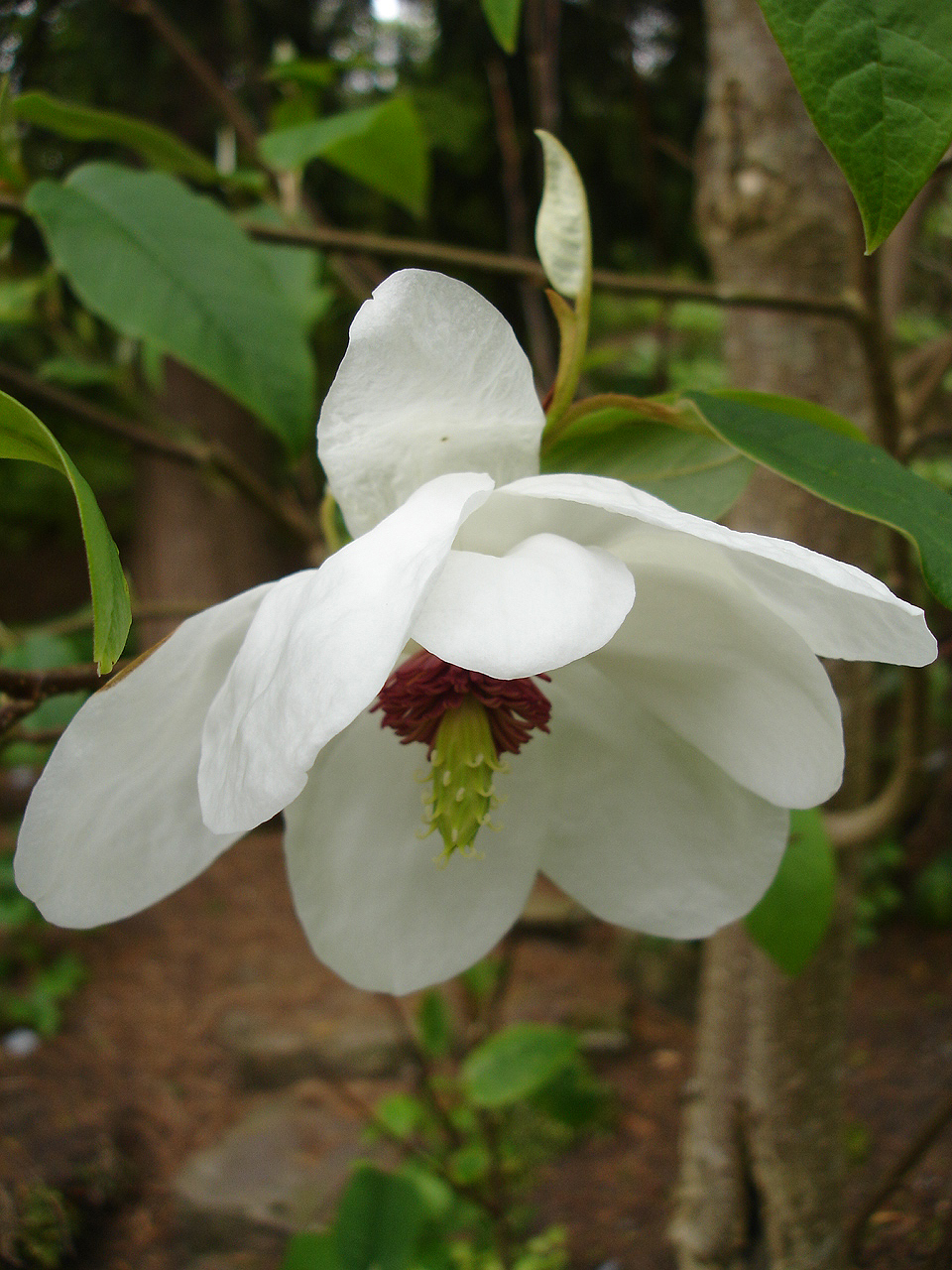
M. wilsonii

==== Subsection Oyama ====
- Magnolia globosa Hook. f. & Thoms. (Nepal, Burma)
- Magnolia sieboldii K. Koch (Korea, E China, Japan)
  - Magnolia sieboldii subsp. japonica K.Ueda (Japan, central China)
  - Magnolia sieboldii subsp. sieboldii (Japan)
  - Magnolia sieboldii subsp. sinensis (Rehd. & Wilson) Spongberg (central China)
- Magnolia wilsonii (Finet. & Gagnep.) Rehd. - Wilson's magnolia (SW China)

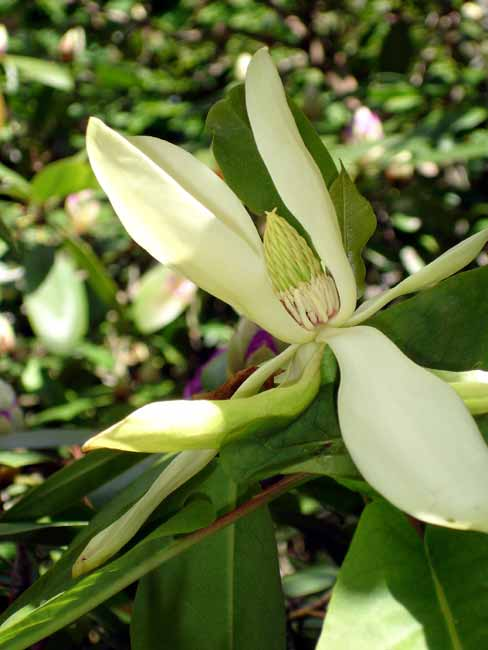
M. fraseri

=== Section Auriculata ===
- Magnolia fraseri Walt. - Fraser magnolia or ear-leaved magnolia (SE US)
  - Magnolia fraseri var. fraseri - Fraser magnolia or ear-leaved magnolia (SE US)
  - Magnolia fraseri var. pyramidata (Bartram) Pampanini - pyramid magnolia (SE US) (Note: Often treated as a distinct species, Magnolia pyramidata.)

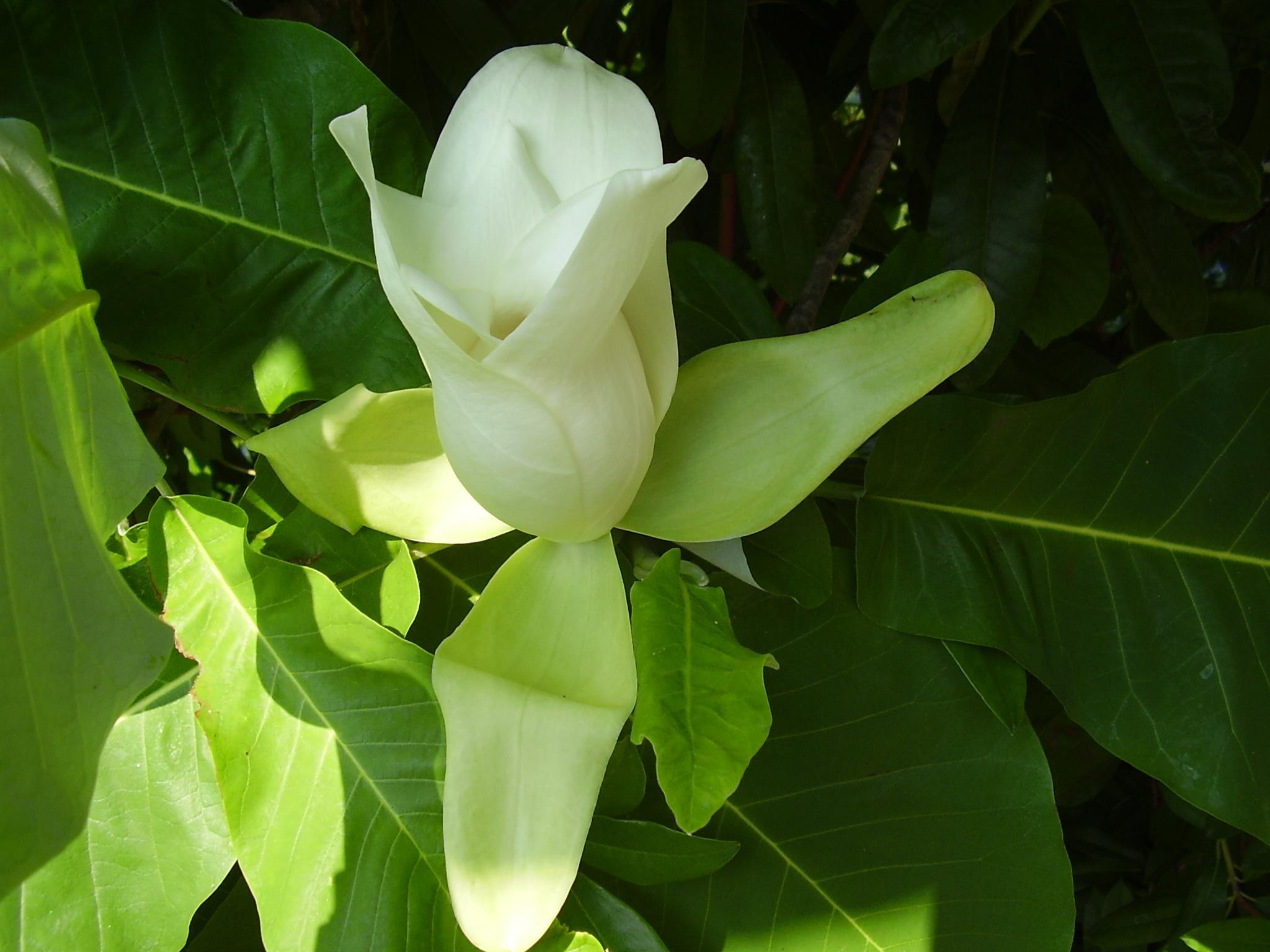
M. ashei flower

=== Section Macrophylla ===
- Magnolia ashei Weath. (Florida) Sometimes treated as a subspecies, Magnolia macrophylla subsp. ashei.
- Magnolia dealbata Zuccarini (E Mexico) Sometimes treated as a subspecies, Magnolia macrophylla subsp. dealbata.
- Magnolia macrophylla Michx. (SE US, E Mexico)
- Magnolia rzedowskiana A.Vázquez, Domínguez-Yescas & R.Pedraza (Querétaro, Mexico)
- Magnolia nuevoleonensis A.Vázquez & Domínguez-Yescas (Nuevo León, Mexico)
- Magnolia vovidesii A.Vázquez, Domínguez-Yescas & L.Carvajal (Veracruz, Mexico)

== Subgenus Yulania ==
Anthers open by splitting at the sides, deciduous, flowers mostly produced before leaves (except M. acuminata)

=== Section Yulania ===
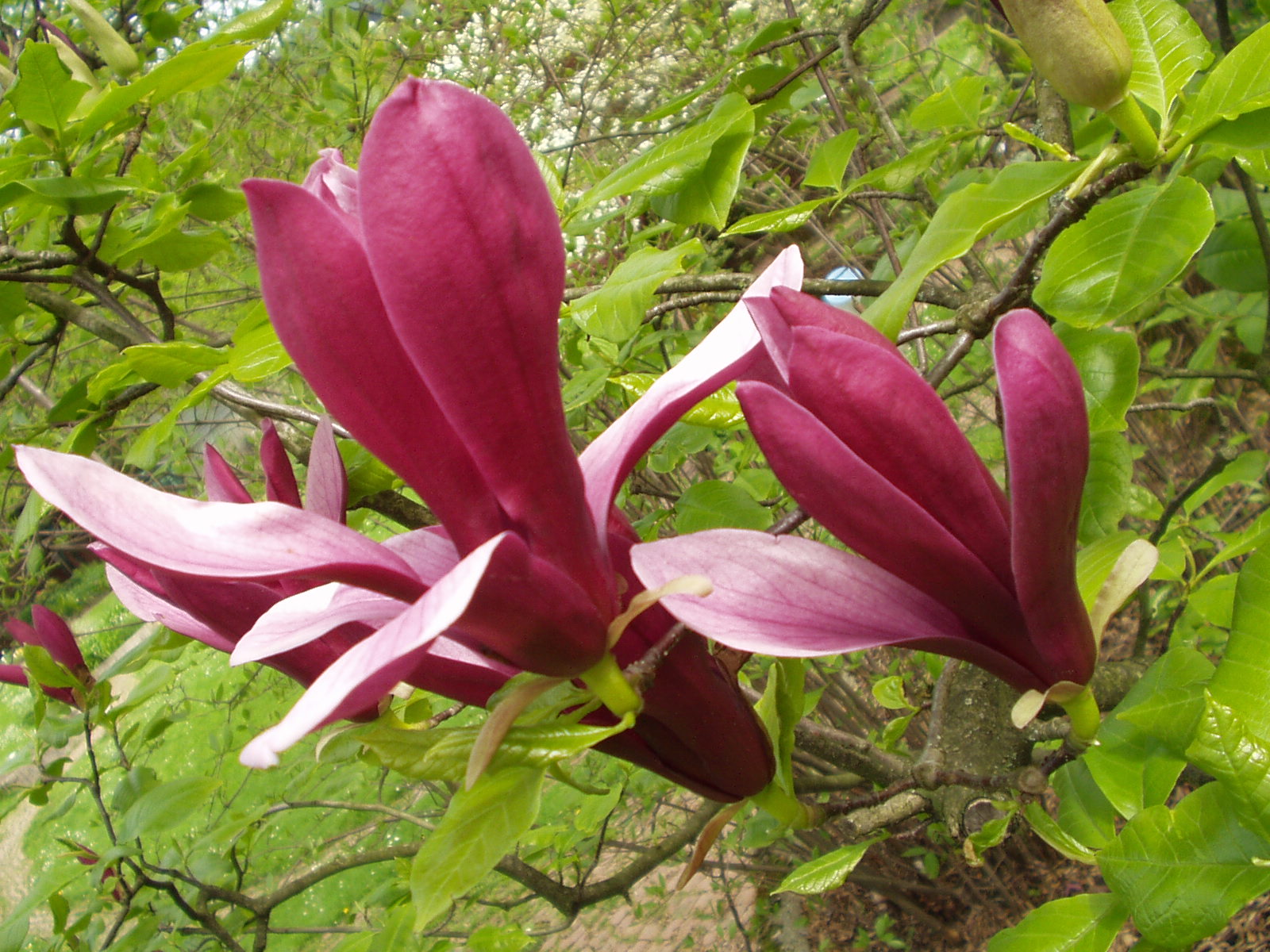
M. liliiflora

==== Subsection Yulania ====
- Magnolia amoena W.C. Cheng (E China)
- Magnolia biondii Pampan (E China)
- Magnolia campbellii Hook. f. & Thomson (W China, Himalayas, India, Nepal, Assam)
  - Magnolia campbellii var. alba Treseder (Himalayas)
  - Magnolia campbellii var. campbellii. (Himalayas)
  - Magnolia campbellii var. mollicomata (W.W. Smith) F. Kingdon-Ward (W China, Himalayas)
- Magnolia cylindrica Wilson (E China)
- Magnolia dawsoniana Rehd. & Wilson (Sichuan (China))
- Magnolia denudata Desr. (E China)
- Magnolia kobus DC. (Japan, Korea) – mokryeon, kobus magnolia, or kobushi magnolia
- Magnolia liliiflora Desr. (central China)
- Magnolia × loebneri Paul Kache (Japan)
- Magnolia salicifolia (Sieb. & Zucc.) Maxim. (Japan)
- Magnolia sargentiana Rehd. & Wilson (W China)
  - Magnolia sargentiana var. robusta Rehd. & Wilson (Sichuan (China))
  - Magnolia sargentiana var. sargentiana (W China)
- Magnolia × soulangeana Thiéb.-Bern. (hybrid origin)
- Magnolia sprengeri Pampan (Sichuan (China))
  - Magnolia sprengeri var. elongata (Rehd. & Wilson) Johnstone (Sichuan (China))
  - Magnolia sprengeri var. sprengeri (Sichuan (China))
- Magnolia stellata (Sieb. & Zucc.) Maxim. (Japan)
- Magnolia zenii Cheng (E China)

==== Subsection Tulipastrum ====
- Magnolia acuminata (L.) L. (E North America)
  - Magnolia acuminata var. acuminata (E North America)
  - Magnolia acuminata var. subcordata (Spach) Dandy (SE US)

=== Section Michelia ===
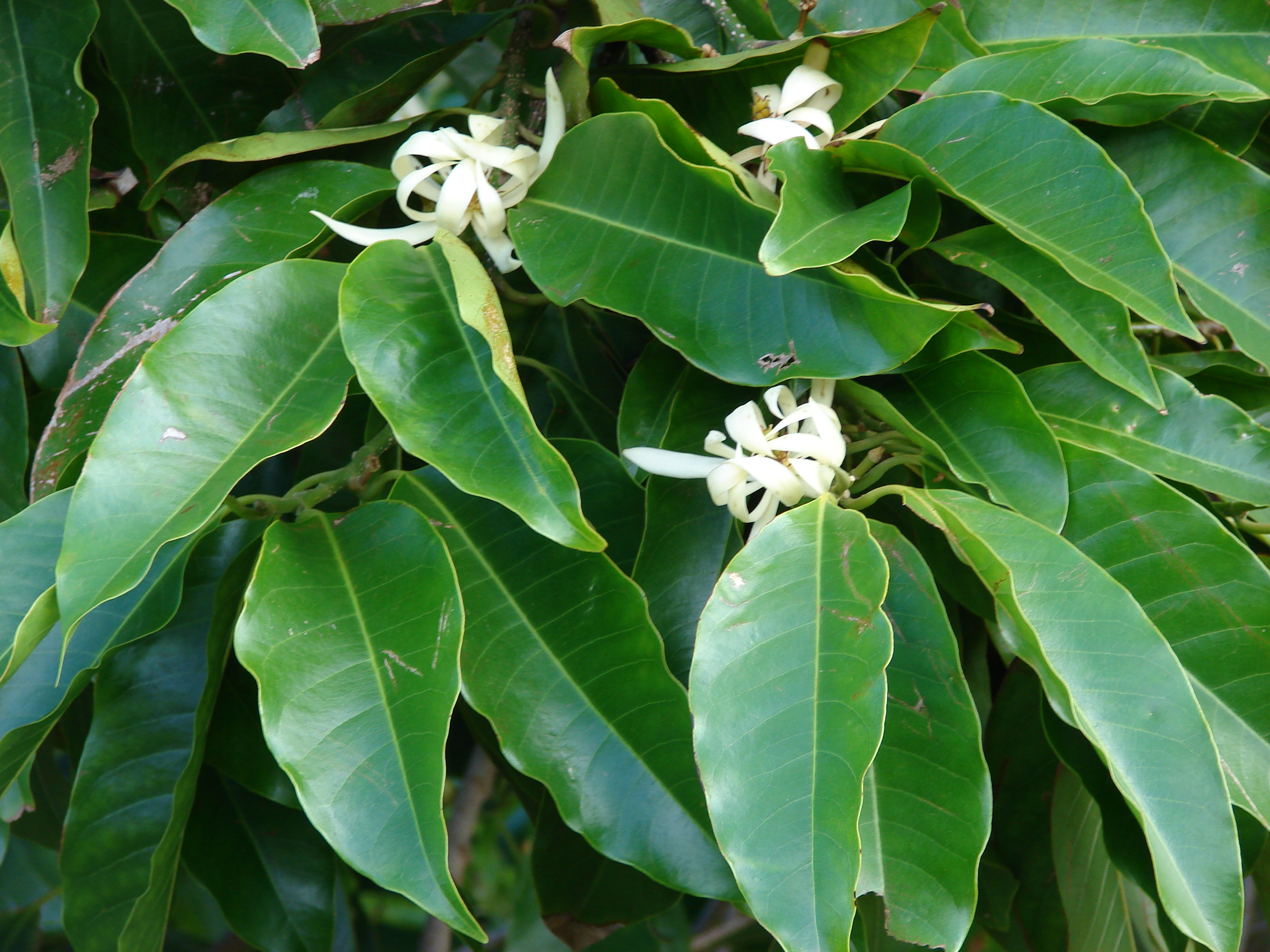
Magnolia × alba

==== Subsection Michelia ====
- Magnolia × alba (DC.) Figlar & Noot. (hybrid origin)
- Magnolia angustioblonga (Law & Wu) Figlar (SW China)
- Magnolia baillonii Pierre (SW China, Vietnam)
- Magnolia balansae A.DC. (S China, Vietnam) (synonyms: Michelia balansae, M. baviensis, M. tonkinensis)
- Magnolia banghamii (Noot.) Figlar & Noot. (Malaysia, Sumatra)
- Magnolia braianensis (Gagnep.) Figlar (Vietnam)
- Magnolia cavaleriei (Finet & Gagnep.) Figlar (S China)
- Magnolia champaca (L.) Baillon ex Pierre (S India, Lesser Sunda isl., Java, Malay penn., Yemen)
  - Magnolia champaca var. champaca (S India, Lesser Sunda isl.)
  - Magnolia champaca var. pubinervia (Blume) Figlar & Noot. (Java, Malay penn.)
- Magnolia chapensis (Dandy) Sima (S China, N Vietnam)
- Magnolia citrata Noot. & Chalermglin (NE Thailand)
- Magnolia compressa Maxim. (Japan, SW China)
- Magnolia coriacea (H.T. Chang & B.L. Chen) Figlar (SE Yunnan (China))
- Magnolia doltsopa (Buch.-Ham. Ex DC.) Figlar (SW China, Himalayas)
- Magnolia elegantifolia Noot. (Zhejiang (China))
- Magnolia ernestii Figlar. (Sichuan (China))
  - Magnolia ernestii subsp. ernestii (Sichuan (China))
  - Magnolia ernestii subsp. szechuanica (Dandy) Sima & Figlar (Sichuan (China))
- Magnolia figo (Lour.) DC. (SE China)
  - Magnolia figo var. crassipes (Law) Figlar & Noot. (SE China)
  - Magnolia figo var. figo . (SE China)
  - Magnolia figo var. skinneriana ined. (SE China)
- Magnolia flaviflora (Law & Wu) Figlar (Vietnam, SW China)
- Magnolia floribunda (Finet & Gagnep.) Figlar. (S China, Vietnam)
- Magnolia foveolata (Merr. Ex Dandy) Figlar (S China, Vietnam)
- Magnolia fujianensis (Q.F.Zheng) Figlar (SE China)
- Magnolia fulva (H.T. Chang & B.L. Chen) Figlar (Yunnan (China), Vietnam?)
  - Magnolia fulva var. calcicola Sima & Yu (Yunnan (China))
  - Magnolia fulva var. fulva . (Yunnan (China))
- Magnolia gioi (A.Chevalier) Noot. (S China, Vietnam)
- Magnolia guangdongensis (Y.H.Yan, Q.W.Zeng & F.W.Xing) Noot. (Guandong (China))
- Magnolia guangxiensis (Law & R.Z.Zhou) Sima (Guangxi (China))
- Magnolia hypolampra (Dandy) Figlar (S China, Vietnam)
- Magnolia iteophylla (C.Y.Wu ex Y.W.Law & Y.F.Wu) Noot. (Yunnan (China))
- Magnolia kingii (Dandy) Figlar (Bangladesh, Assam)
- Magnolia kisopa (Bush.-Ham. ex DC.) Figlar (Vietnam, Nepal)
- Magnolia koordersiana (Noot.) Figlar (Malaysia, W Sumatra)
- Magnolia lacei (W.W.Smith) Figlar (SW China, Vietnam)
- Magnolia laevifolia (Law & Y.F.Wu) Noot. (Yunnan (China))
- Magnolia lanuginosa (Wall.) Figlar & Noot. (Yunnan (China), Nepal)
- Magnolia leveilleana (Dandy) Figlar (SW China)
- Magnolia macclurei (Dandy) Figlar (S China, N Vietnam)
  - Magnolia macclurei var. macclurei. (S China, N Vietnam)
  - Magnolia macclurei var. sublanea Dandy (Guangdong (China))
- Magnolia mannii (King) King (Assam)
- Magnolia martinii H.Lev. (SE China, Vietnam)
- Magnolia masticata (Dandy) Figlar (Yunnan (China), Laos)
- Magnolia maudiae (Dunn) Figlar (SE China, Hainan isl.)
  - Magnolia maudiae var. hunanensis (C.L.Peng & L.H.Yan) Sima (Hunan (China))
  - Magnolia maudiae var. maudiae (SE China, Hainan Isl.)
  - Magnolia maudiae var. platypetala (Hand.-Mazz.) Sima (s.central China)
- Magnolia mediocris (Dandy) Figlar (S China, Vietnam)
- Magnolia microcarpa (B.L.Chen & S.C.Yang) Sima (S China)
- Magnolia microtricha (Hand.-Mazz.) Figlar. (Yunnan (China))
- Magnolia montana (Blume) Figlar & Noot. (Malaysia to Borneo)
- Magnolia nilagirica (Zenker) Figlar (S India, Sri Lanka)
- Magnolia oblonga (Wall. Ex Hook.f. & Thomson) Figlar. (Assam)
- Magnolia odora (Chun) Figlar & Noot. (SE China, N Vietnam)
- Magnolia opipara (H.T.Chang & B.L.Chen) Sima (Yunnan (China))
- Magnolia philippinensis P.Pharm (Philippines)
- Magnolia punduana (Hook.f. & Thoms.) Figlar (Assam)
- Magnolia rajaniana (Craib.) Figlar. (Thailand)
- Magnolia scortechinii (King) Figlar & Noot. (Malay penn., W Sumatra)
- Magnolia shiluensis (Chun & Y.F.Wu) Figlar (Hainan isl.)
- Magnolia sirindhorniae Noot. & Chalermglin (Thailand)
- Magnolia sphaerantha (C.Y.Wu ex Z.S.Yue) Sima (SW China)
- Magnolia subulifera (Dandy) Figlar (Vietnam)
- Magnolia sumatrae (Dandy) Figlar & Noot. (Malaysia, Sumatra)
- Magnolia xanthantha (C.Y.Wu ex Law & Y.F.Wu) Figlar (Yunnan (China))

==== Subsection Elmerrillia ====
- Magnolia platyphylla (Merr.) Figlar & Noot. (Philippines)
- Magnolia pubescens (Merr.) Figlar & Noot. (Philippines)
- Magnolia sulawesiana Brambach, Noot. & Culmsee (Sulawesi)
- Magnolia tsiampacca (L.) Figlar & Noot. (Sumatra, Borneo, Sulawesi, Moluccas, New Guinea, Bismarck Archipelago)
  - Magnolia tsiampacca subsp. mollis (Dandy) Figlar & Noot. (Sumatra, Borneo)
  - Magnolia tsiampacca subsp. tsiampacca (Sulawesi, Moluccas, New Guinea, Bismarck Archipelago)
    - Magnolia tsiampacca subsp. tsiampacca var. glaberrima (Dandy) Figlar & Noot. (New Guinea)
    - Magnolia tsiampacca subsp. tsiampacca var. tsiampacca (Sulawesi, Moluccas, New Guinea, Bismarck Archipelago)
- Magnolia vrieseana (Miq.) Baill. ex Pierre (Sulawesi, Moluccas)

==== Subsection Maingola ====
- Magnolia annamensis Dandy (Vietnam)
- Magnolia carsonii Dandy ex Noot. (Borneo, Celebes)
  - Magnolia carsonii var. carsonii (Borneo)
  - Magnolia carsonii var. drymifolia Noot. (Borneo)
  - Magnolia carsonii var. phaulanta (Dandy ex Noot.) S.Kim (Celebes)
- Magnolia cathcartii (Hook.f. & Thoms.) Noot. (SW China, Burma)
- Magnolia griffithii King (India, Assam)
- Magnolia gustavii King (India, Assam)
- Magnolia macklottii (Korth.) Dandy (W Java, Borneo, Sumatra)
  - Magnolia macklottii var. beccariana (Agostini) Noot. (Sumatra)
  - Magnolia macklottii var. macklottii (W Java, Borneo)
- Magnolia pealiana King (Assam)

==== Subsection Aromadendron ====
- Magnolia ashtonii Dandy ex. Noot. (Sumatra, Borneo)
- Magnolia bintuluensis (Agostini) Noot. (Sumatra, Borneo)
- Magnolia borneensis Noot. (Borneo, Philippines)
- Magnolia elegans (Blume) Keng (Sumatra, Java)
- Magnolia pahangensis Noot. (Borneo, Philippines)

== Subgenus Gynopodium ==
=== Section Gynopodium ===
- Magnolia kachirachirai (Kanehira & Yamamoto) Dandy (Taiwan)
- Magnolia lotungensis Chun & Tsoon (S China)
- Magnolia nitida W.W.Smith (NW Yunnan (China))
- Magnolia omeiensis (Hu & Cheng) Dandy (Sichuan (China))
- Magnolia yunnanensis (Hu) Noot. (SE Yunnan (China))

=== Section Manglietiastrum ===
- Magnolia pleiocarpa (Dandy) Figlar & Noot. (Assam)
- Magnolia praecalva (Dandy) Figlar & Noot. (Vietnam, Malay penn.)
- Magnolia sinica (Law) Noot. (SE Yunnan (China))
