= Magnolia macclurei =

Conservation status
- Least Concern (IUCN 3.1)

Scientific classification
- Kingdom: Plantae
- Clade: Embryophytes
- Clade: Tracheophytes
- Clade: Spermatophytes
- Clade: Angiosperms
- Clade: Magnoliids
- Order: Magnoliales
- Family: Magnoliaceae
- Genus: Magnolia
- Species: M. macclurei

Binomial name
- Magnolia macclurei (Dandy) Figlar

Synonyms
- Magnolia multitepala (R.Z.Zhou & S.G.Jian) C.B.Callaghan & Png; Michelia macclurei Dandy; Michelia macclurei var. sublanea Dandy; Michelia multitepala R.Z.Zhou & S.G.Jian

Species of plant

Magnolia macclurei (syn. Michelia macclurei) is a species of flowering plant in the family Magnoliaceae, native to southern China, including Hainan, and northern Vietnam. A tree reaching 30 m (98 ft), it is found growing in evergreen broadleaf forests, from 200 to 1,500 m (700 to 4,900 ft) above sea level.

When Floyd Alonzo McClure first encountered this species in 1925, he recorded in his notebook that, "The fragrance of the flowers is the most intoxicating I ever breathed." In China it is harvested for its timber, and it is used as a street tree in a number of southern Chinese cities. In Florida it is planted as an ornamental and is available from commercial nurseries.
