= Magnolia praecalva =

Conservation status
- Data Deficient (IUCN 3.1)

Scientific classification
- Kingdom: Plantae
- Clade: Embryophytes
- Clade: Tracheophytes
- Clade: Spermatophytes
- Clade: Angiosperms
- Clade: Magnoliids
- Order: Magnoliales
- Family: Magnoliaceae
- Genus: Magnolia
- Species: M. praecalva

Binomial name
- Magnolia praecalva (Dandy) Figlar & Noot.

Synonyms
- Pachylarnax praecalva Dandy

Species of tree

Magnolia praecalva is a species of flowering plant in the family Magnoliaceae. It is a tree native to Peninsular Malaysia, Sumatra, Thailand and Vietnam. In Vietnam, the species is found in the evergreen broadleaved forests of the High Plateau. It has suffered from population decline due to its exploitation for timber.
