= Magnolia sulawesiana =

Conservation status
- Endangered (IUCN 3.1)

Scientific classification
- Kingdom: Plantae
- Clade: Embryophytes
- Clade: Tracheophytes
- Clade: Spermatophytes
- Clade: Angiosperms
- Clade: Magnoliids
- Order: Magnoliales
- Family: Magnoliaceae
- Genus: Magnolia
- Subgenus: Magnolia subg. Yulania
- Section: Magnolia sect. Michelia
- Subsection: Magnolia subsect. Elmerrillia
- Species: M. sulawesiana

Binomial name
- Magnolia sulawesiana Brambach, Noot. & Culmsee

Species of tree

Magnolia sulawesiana is a large evergreen tree of the family Magnoliaceae that grows in tropical montane forests on the Indonesian island of Sulawesi.

== Description ==
This is a large, evergreen tree, up to 35 m tall and with a dbh of up to 100 cm. As with all other species of Magnolia, the twigs have stipules that enclose the twig tips and leave conspicuous circular scars after falling off. The leaves are spirally arranged, usually oblong, rather small for a Magnolia (usually 6-9 x 3–4.5 cm) and, like the other parts of the plant, almost completely glabrous. Only on the upper side of the petiole and on the lower side of the lamina, next to the midrib, there is a thin, but conspicuous line of brown hairs. The flowers are solitary on short stalks in the leaf-axils, have a diameter of c. 4 cm and white tepals. The fruits consist of 8-11 apocarpous carpels that release the seeds at maturity.

The combination of the hairs, flower position and low number of carpels is unique for the species and can be used to distinguish M. sulawesiana from all other species of Magnolia in Sulawesi.

== Distribution and ecology ==
The species in only known from three sites, all located in the central mountain range of Sulawesi, including Lore Lindu National Park. There, it forms part of the canopy in moist tropical montane forests at elevations of 1,600–2,200 metres (5,200–7,200 ft). It is currently the only species of Magnolia considered endemic to Sulawesi.

== Uses ==
While other species of Magnolia, such as M. tsiampacca and M. vrieseana, are much sought after for their valuable timber, M. sulawesiana is currently not known to be exploited. This is possibly due to its occurrence at remote locations and high elevations.
