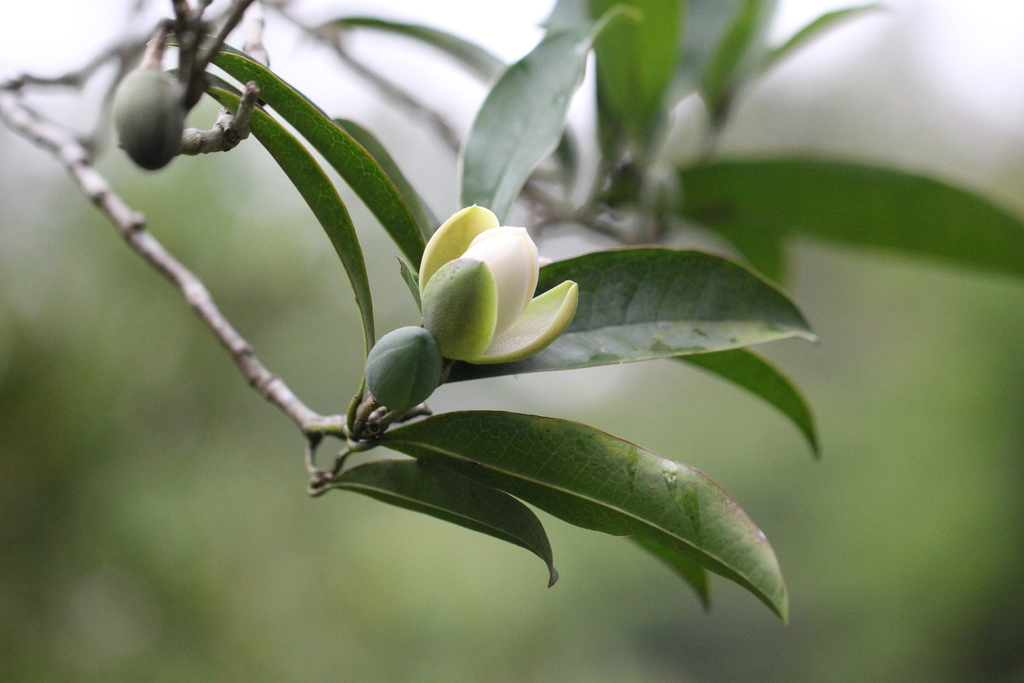
- Magnolia championii with flower buds

Conservation status
- Data Deficient (IUCN 3.1)

Scientific classification
- Kingdom: Plantae
- Clade: Embryophytes
- Clade: Tracheophytes
- Clade: Spermatophytes
- Clade: Angiosperms
- Clade: Magnoliids
- Order: Magnoliales
- Family: Magnoliaceae
- Genus: Magnolia
- Species: M. championii

Binomial name
- Magnolia championii Benth.

Synonyms
- Lirianthe championii (Benth.) N.H.Xia & C.Y.Wu; Lirianthe shangsiensis (Y.W.Law, R.Z.Zhou & H.F.Chen) Sima & Hong Yu; Magnolia liliifera var. championii (Benth.) Pamp.; Magnolia mulunica Y.W.Law & Q.W.Zeng; Magnolia paenetalauma Dandy; Magnolia pumila var. championii (Benth.) Finet & Gagnep.; Magnolia shangsiensis Y.W.Law, R.Z.Zhou & H.F.Chen; Magnolia tenuicarpella H.T.Chang

= Magnolia championii =

Species of magnolia

Magnolia championii is a species of Magnolia belonging to the Magnoliaceae family. It is a shrub or tree native to southern China, including Hong Kong and Guangdong, and northern Vietnam, from 500 to 1,000 meters elevation above the sea level.
