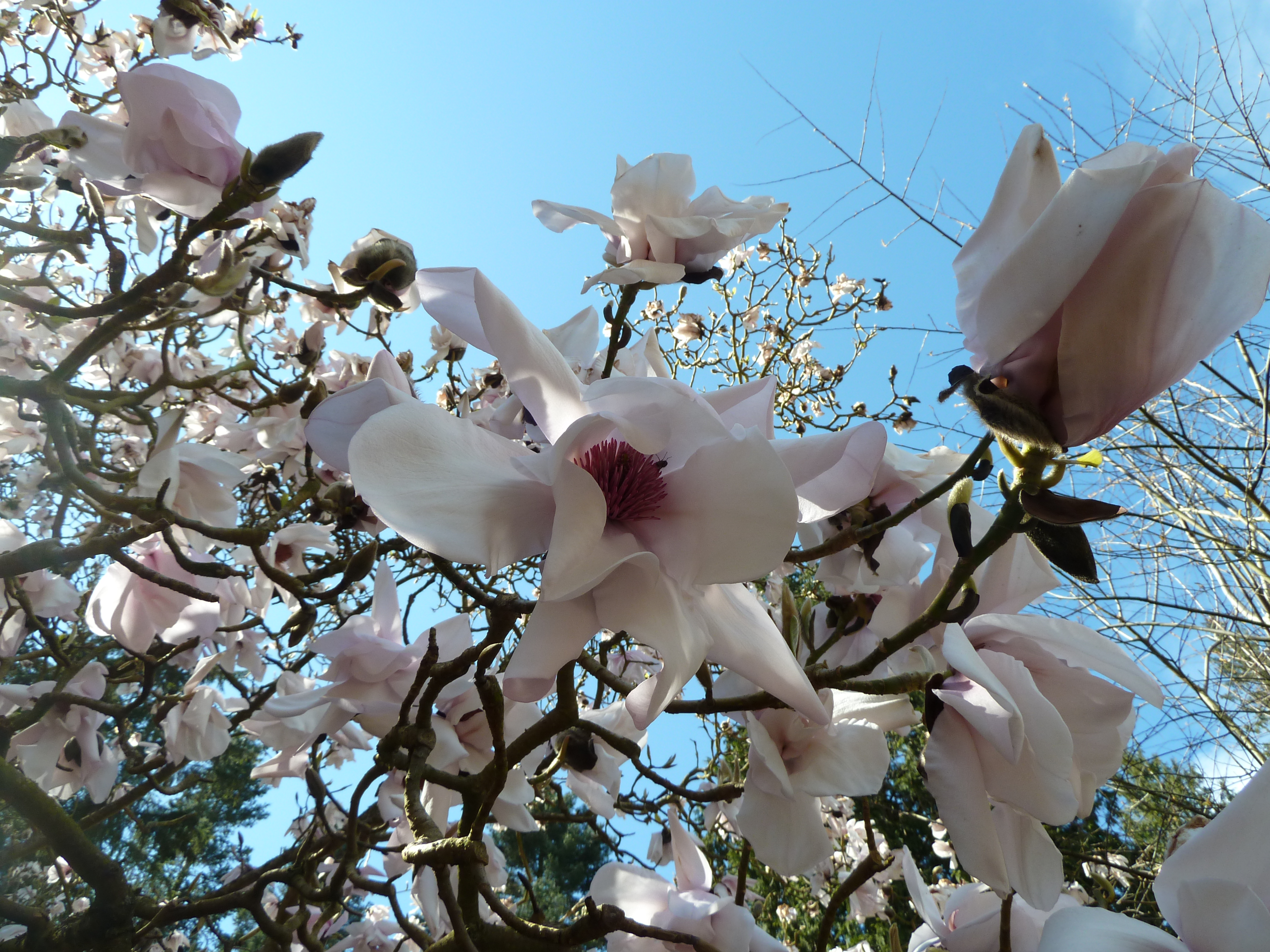

Conservation status
- Vulnerable (IUCN 3.1)

Scientific classification
- Kingdom: Plantae
- Clade: Embryophytes
- Clade: Tracheophytes
- Clade: Spermatophytes
- Clade: Angiosperms
- Clade: Magnoliids
- Order: Magnoliales
- Family: Magnoliaceae
- Genus: Magnolia
- Subgenus: Magnolia subg. Yulania
- Section: Magnolia sect. Yulania
- Subsection: Magnolia subsect. Yulania
- Species: M. sargentiana

Binomial name
- Magnolia sargentiana Rehder & E.H.Wilson

Synonyms
- Magnolia conspicua var. emarginata Finet & Gagnep.; Magnolia denudata var. emarginata (Finet & Gagnep.) Pamp.; Magnolia emarginata (Finet & Gagnep.) W.C.Cheng; Magnolia sargentiana var. robusta Rehder & E.H.Wilson; Yulania sargentiana (Rehder & E.H.Wilson) D.L.Fu

= Magnolia sargentiana =

Species of tree

Magnolia sargentiana is a species of flowering plant in the family Magnoliaceae. It is endemic to China, where it occurs in Sichuan and Yunnan. It is widely distributed but its populations are fragmented. Its total population was estimated at ~20,000 after field surveys were conducted in April 2006.

This is a forest tree which grows 8 to 25 meters tall. It is harvested for wood and herbal medicine.

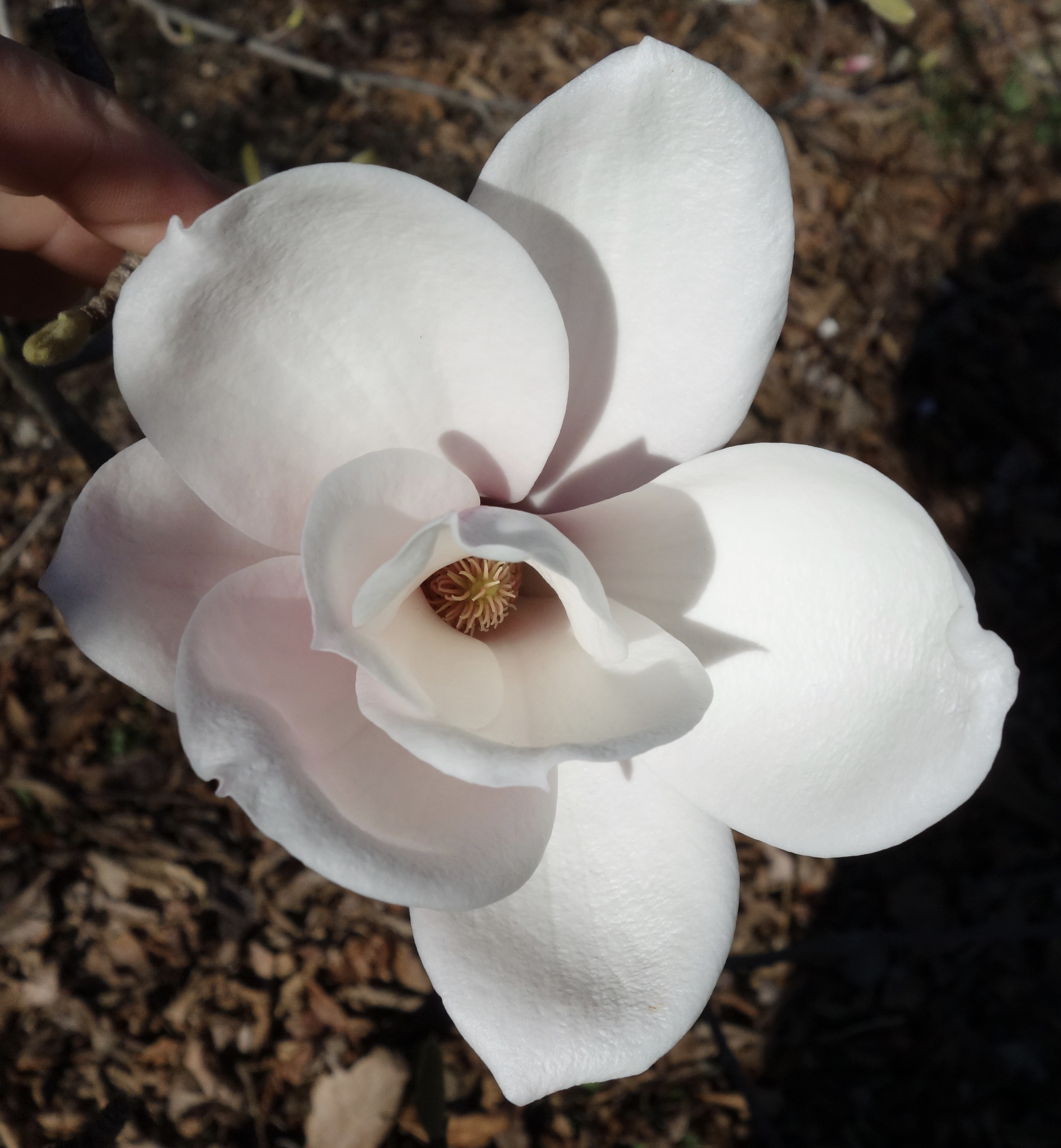
M. sargentiana flower

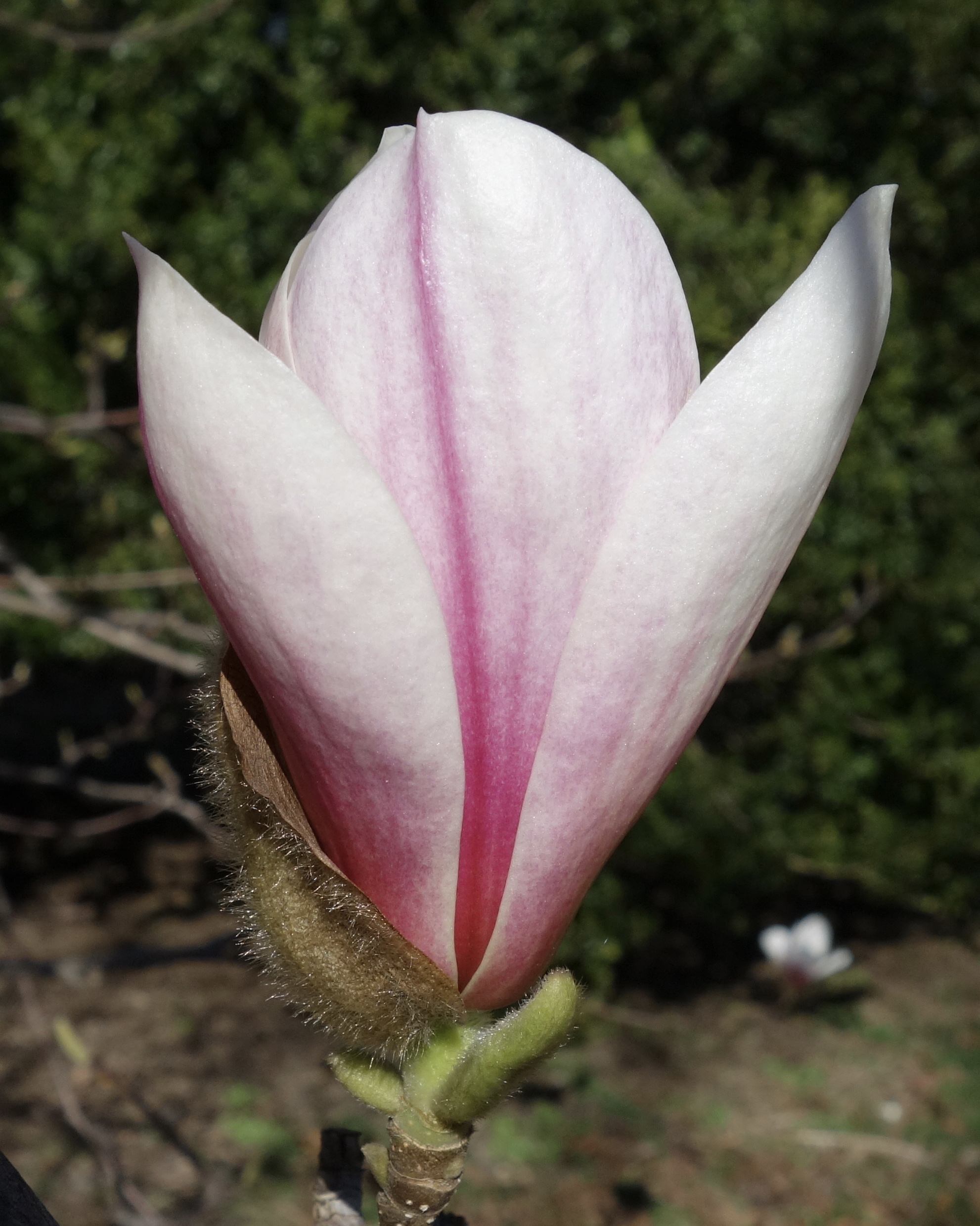
Flower tepals
