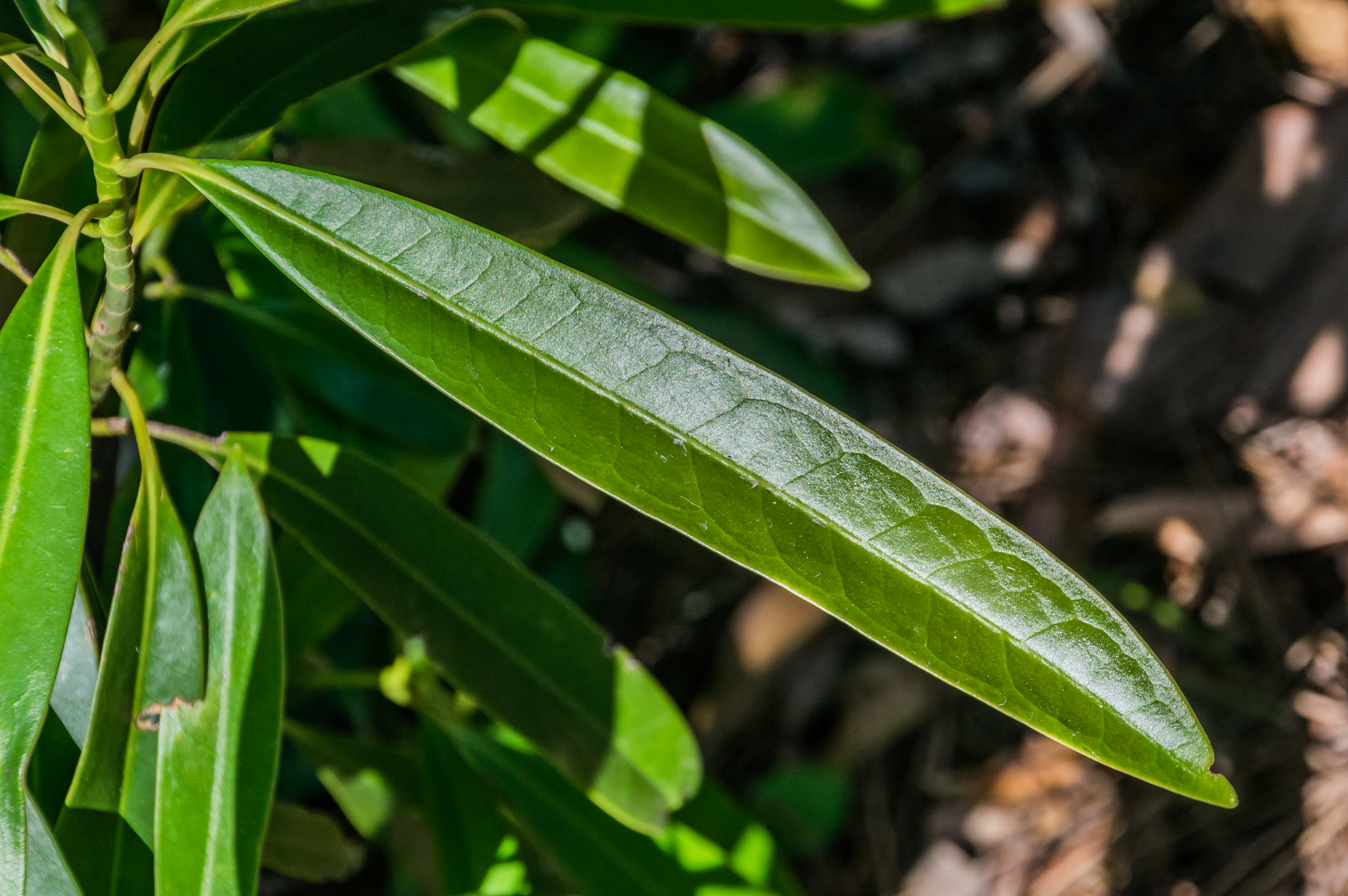
- Leaves

Conservation status
- Least Concern (IUCN 3.1)

Scientific classification
- Kingdom: Plantae
- Clade: Embryophytes
- Clade: Tracheophytes
- Clade: Spermatophytes
- Clade: Angiosperms
- Clade: Magnoliids
- Order: Magnoliales
- Family: Magnoliaceae
- Genus: Magnolia
- Species: M. insignis

Binomial name
- Magnolia insignis Wall.

Synonyms
- List: Magnolia insignis var. angustifolia (Hook.f. & Thomson) H.J.Chowdhery & P.Daniel; Magnolia insignis var. latifolia (Hook.f. & Thomson) H.J.Chowdhery & P.Daniel; Magnolia maguanica (Hung T.Chang & B.L.Chen) C.B.Callaghan & Png; Magnolia rufisyncarpa (Y.W.Law, R.Z.Zhou & F.G.Wang) C.B.Callaghan & Png; Magnolia shangpaensis Hu; Manglietia insignis (Wall.) Blume; Manglietia insignis var. angustifolia Hook.f. & Thomson; Manglietia insignis var. latifolia Hook.f. & Thomson; Manglietia maguanica Hung T.Chang & B.L.Chen; Manglietia rufisyncarpa Y.W.Law, R.Z.Zhou & F.G.Wang; Manglietia yunnanensis Hu

= Magnolia insignis =

Species of flowering plant

Magnolia insignis (syn. Manglietia insignis), the red lotus tree, is a species of flowering plant in the family Magnoliaceae, native to Nepal, Assam, Tibet, southern China, Myanmar, Thailand and Vietnam. It is used as a street tree in a number of southern Chinese cities.

== Description ==
=== Vegetative characteristics ===
Magnolia insignis is an evergreen, or semi-deciduous, up to 30 m (98 ft) tall tree.

=== Generative characteristics ===
The solitary, terminal, erect, white to pink, 7.5 cm (3.0 in) wide flowers are fragrant. The fruit is elongate, ovoid-ellipsoid, dehiscent, 7–12 cm (2.8–4.7 in) long, and 3 cm wide.

== Cytology ==
The diploid chromosome count is 2n = 38.

== Taxonomy ==
It was published by Nathaniel Wallich in 1824.

== Conservation ==
The IUCN conservation status is Least Concern (LC).

== Ecology ==
=== Habitat ===
It occurs in evergreen broad-leaved forests at elevations of 900–1,650 m (2,950–5,410 ft) above sea level.

== Use ==
It is used for its wood and as an ornamental plant.
