= Magnolia grandis =

Conservation status
- Critically Endangered (IUCN 3.1)

Scientific classification
- Kingdom: Plantae
- Clade: Embryophytes
- Clade: Tracheophytes
- Clade: Spermatophytes
- Clade: Angiosperms
- Clade: Magnoliids
- Order: Magnoliales
- Family: Magnoliaceae
- Genus: Magnolia
- Species: M. grandis

Binomial name
- Magnolia grandis (Hu & W.C.Cheng) V.S.Kumar

Synonyms
- Manglietia grandis Hu & W.C.Cheng

Species of flowering plant

Magnolia grandis is a species of flowering plant in the family Magnoliaceae. It is a tree endemic to southeastern Yunnan and southwestern Guangxi in southern China. It is threatened by habitat loss.
