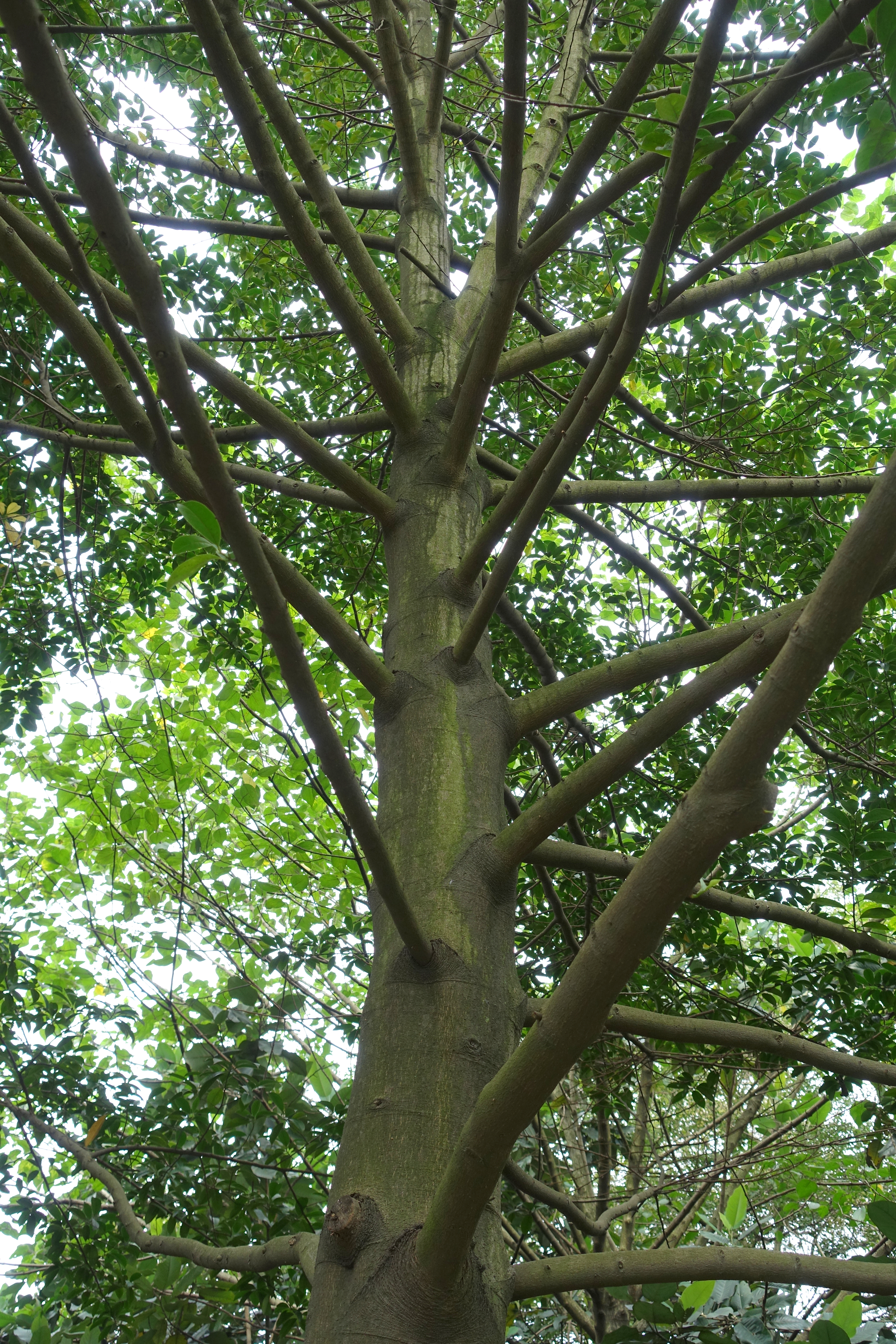

Conservation status
- Data Deficient (IUCN 3.1)

Scientific classification
- Kingdom: Plantae
- Clade: Embryophytes
- Clade: Tracheophytes
- Clade: Angiosperms
- Clade: Magnoliids
- Order: Magnoliales
- Family: Magnoliaceae
- Genus: Magnolia
- Species: M. ernestii

Binomial name
- Magnolia ernestii Figlar

Synonyms
- Michelia wilsonii Finet & Gagnepain

= Magnolia ernestii =

Species of tree

Magnolia ernestii, synonym Michelia wilsonii, the yellow lily-tree, is a species of plant in the family Magnoliaceae. It is endemic to China. It is threatened by habitat loss.
