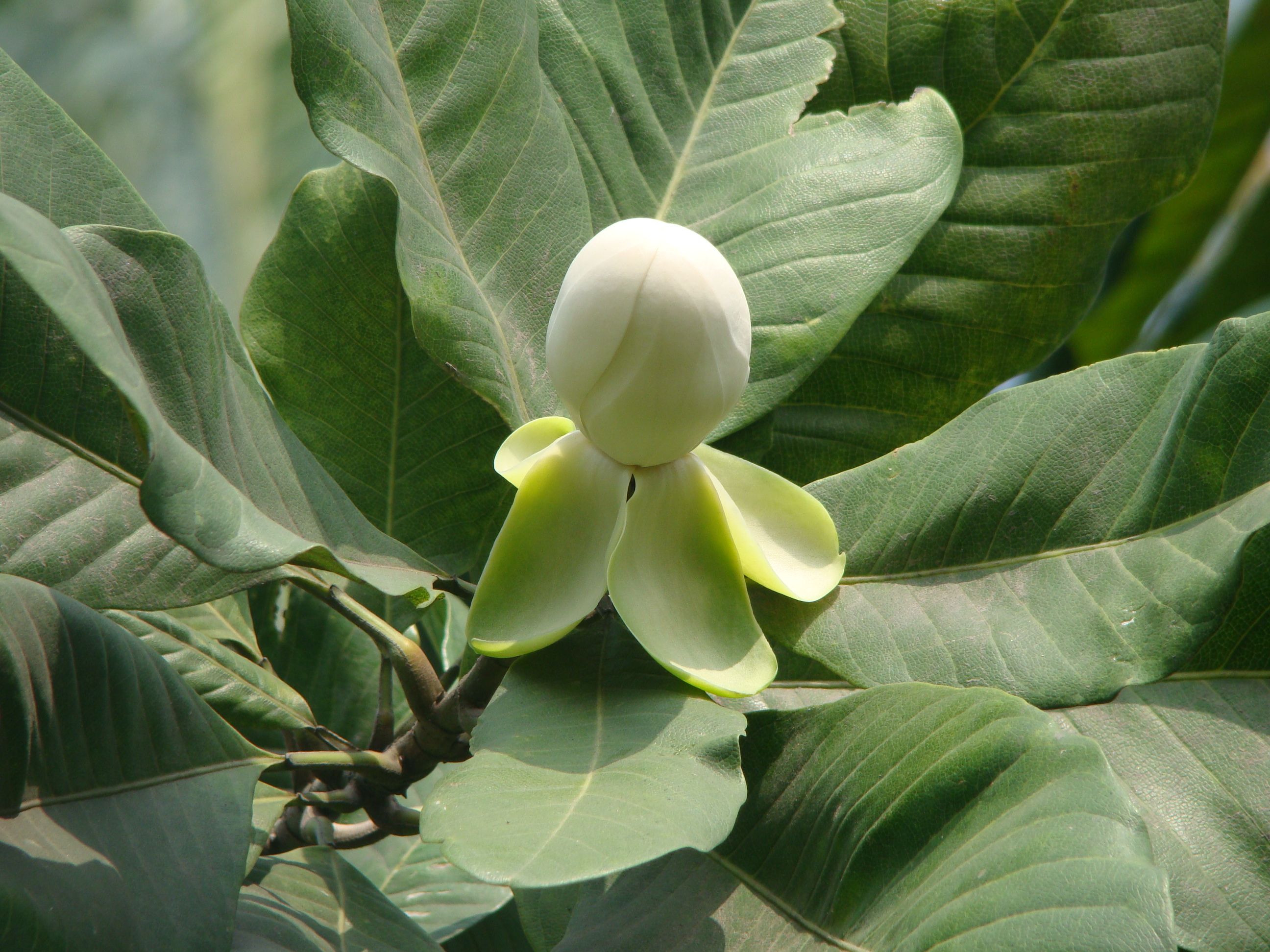
- Flower, Bangladesh

Conservation status
- Data Deficient (IUCN 3.1)

Scientific classification
- Kingdom: Plantae
- Clade: Embryophytes
- Clade: Tracheophytes
- Clade: Spermatophytes
- Clade: Angiosperms
- Clade: Magnoliids
- Order: Magnoliales
- Family: Magnoliaceae
- Genus: Magnolia
- Species: M. pterocarpa

Binomial name
- Magnolia pterocarpa Roxb.

Synonyms
- Lirianthe grandiflora Spach; Lirianthe pterocarpa (Roxb.) Sima & S.G.Lu; Liriodendron grandiflorum Roxb.; Liriodendron indicum Spreng.; Magnolia sphenocarpa Hook.f. & Thomson; Michelia macrophylla D.Don; Sphenocarpus pterocarpus (Roxb.) K.Koch; Talauma roxburghii G.Don

= Magnolia pterocarpa =

Species of plant

Magnolia pterocarpa is a species of tree in the Magnoliaceae family that grows in South Asia.

== Description ==
The trees are evergreen. The young branchlets are pubescent. The leaves are petiolate, petiole 2–5 cm long, lamina obovate-oblong, obtuse or subacute at the apex, attenuated at the base, coriaceous, glabrous and shiny above, rusty tomentose beneath when young. Its flowers are white, fragrant with 9 Tepals. The outer 3 are sepaloid, green outside, greenish-white inside, while the inner 6 are petaloid. Stamens are numerous, and the filaments are short. Gynoecium ovoid. The fruiting receptacles are ellipsoid, c. 15 × 7 cm, ripe carpels oblong, beaked, and feathery. It has 2 orange seeds. Flowering and fruiting happen from April–November.

== Distribution and habitat ==
It ranges from Uttarakhand in the western Himalayas through Nepal and Sikkim in the central Himalayas to Assam and Bangladesh. It is native to frost-free montane subtropical and lowland tropical forests in the Himalayas.
