= Magnolia odora =

Conservation status
- Vulnerable (IUCN 2.3)

Scientific classification
- Kingdom: Plantae
- Clade: Embryophytes
- Clade: Tracheophytes
- Clade: Spermatophytes
- Clade: Angiosperms
- Clade: Magnoliids
- Order: Magnoliales
- Family: Magnoliaceae
- Genus: Magnolia
- Species: M. odora

Binomial name
- Magnolia odora (Chun) Figlar & Noot.

Synonyms
- Michelia gravis Dandy ex Gagnep.; Michelia odora (Chun) Noot. & B.L.Chen; Tsoongiodendron odorum Chun

Species of tree

Magnolia odora is a species of plant in the family Magnoliaceae. It is found in China, including Hainan, and Vietnam. It is threatened by habitat loss.
