= Magnolia nana =

Conservation status
- Endangered (IUCN 3.1)

Scientific classification
- Kingdom: Plantae
- Clade: Embryophytes
- Clade: Tracheophytes
- Clade: Spermatophytes
- Clade: Angiosperms
- Clade: Magnoliids
- Order: Magnoliales
- Family: Magnoliaceae
- Genus: Magnolia
- Subgenus: Magnolia subg. Magnolia
- Section: Magnolia sect. Gwillimia
- Subsection: Magnolia subsect. Gwillimia
- Species: M. nana

Binomial name
- Magnolia nana Dandy

Synonyms
- Lirianthe nana (Dandy) Sima, S.G.Lu, N.H.Xia & Q.N.Vu

Species of shrub

A member of the family Magnoliaceae, Magnolia nana is a species of evergreen shrub that produces white or cream colored flowers. It can grow to be 2–3 ft (61–91 cm) in height and 2–3 ft (61–91 cm) in width. The Dwarf Magnolia is endemic to northern Vietnam. It grows in most moderate climates, but cannot withstand dryness or drought. Magnolia nana grows best in well drained, partially alkaline soil, with exposure to partial sunlight.

== Description ==
The dwarf magnolia is a small shrub with thick, dark green leaves. The leaves are wide and flat, and they taper to a point at the end. The top of the leaf is covered in a waxy coating that makes them appear very shiny. The underside of the leaf is duller than the top, yet still smooth. The flowers themselves are white with multiple, overlapping layers of petals. These petals are wide and rounded in shape. The anthers and stigma are present in a whorl like mound at the center of the flower in a dusty yellow coloring. Magnolia nana does not produce pink or purple pigments like some other species of magnolias. It does produce large amounts of pollen and is an insect pollinated plant. The blooms are average to large size, similar to Magnolia grandiflora, and produce a very fragrant smell to attract pollinators.

Magnolia nana blooms its flowers in late spring to early summer. The flowers will remain through the summer and end sometime in late summer to early fall. The leaves stay green throughout the year and will remain on the plant for longer than one blooming season. The branches on this plant are denser than most species of magnolias, making this a common potted house plant.
