= Magnolia ovoidea =

Conservation status
- Critically Endangered (IUCN 3.1)

Scientific classification
- Kingdom: Plantae
- Clade: Embryophytes
- Clade: Tracheophytes
- Clade: Spermatophytes
- Clade: Angiosperms
- Clade: Magnoliids
- Order: Magnoliales
- Family: Magnoliaceae
- Genus: Magnolia
- Species: M. ovoidea

Binomial name
- Magnolia ovoidea (Hung T.Chang & B.L.Chen) V.S.Kumar

Synonyms
- Manglietia ovoidea Hung T.Chang & B.L.Chen

Species of flowering plant

Magnolia ovoidea is a species of flowering plant in the family Magnoliaceae. It is a tree endemic to southeastern Yunnan in south-central China. There are only four small subpopulations of this critically endangered species. The total population was estimated at less than 50 individuals as of 2007.

This is a forest tree growing up to 10 meters tall. The leathery leaves are up to 14 centimeters long. The flower has eleven leathery tepals. They are yellow-green in color, the innermost taking a purple tinge.
