= Magnolia dandyi =

Conservation status
- Least Concern (IUCN 3.1)

Scientific classification
- Kingdom: Plantae
- Clade: Embryophytes
- Clade: Tracheophytes
- Clade: Spermatophytes
- Clade: Angiosperms
- Clade: Magnoliids
- Order: Magnoliales
- Family: Magnoliaceae
- Genus: Magnolia
- Subgenus: Magnolia subg. Magnolia
- Section: Magnolia sect. Manglietia
- Species: M. dandyi

Binomial name
- Magnolia dandyi Gagnep.

Synonyms
- Magnolia megaphylla (Hu & W.C.Cheng) V.S.Kumar; Manglietia dandyi (Gagnep.) Dandy; Manglietia sinoconifera F.N.Wei; Manglietia megaphylla Hu & W.C.Cheng; Manglietia sinoconifera F.N.Wei

Species of flowering plant

Magnolia dandyi is a species of flowering plant in the family Magnoliaceae. It is a tree native to northern Vietnam, Laos, and southern China where it occurs in western Yunnan and southeastern Guangxi provinces. It is threatened by habitat loss.
