= Magnolia coriacea =

Conservation status
- Endangered (IUCN 3.1)

Scientific classification
- Kingdom: Plantae
- Clade: Embryophytes
- Clade: Tracheophytes
- Clade: Spermatophytes
- Clade: Angiosperms
- Clade: Magnoliids
- Order: Magnoliales
- Family: Magnoliaceae
- Genus: Magnolia
- Species: M. coriacea

Binomial name
- Magnolia coriacea (Hung T.Chang & B.L.Chen) Figlar

Synonyms
- Michelia coriacea Hung T.Chang & B.L.Chen; Michelia nitida B.L.Chen; Michelia polyneura C.Y.Wu ex Y.W.Law & Y.F.Wu

Species of tree

Magnolia coriacea is a species of flowering plant in the family Magnoliaceae. It is a tree native to southeastern Yunnan in south-central China. There are no more than about 500 individuals remaining of this endangered species.

This is a tree growing 10 to 20 meters tall. The leaves are up to 15 centimeters long. The flowers have white tepals.
