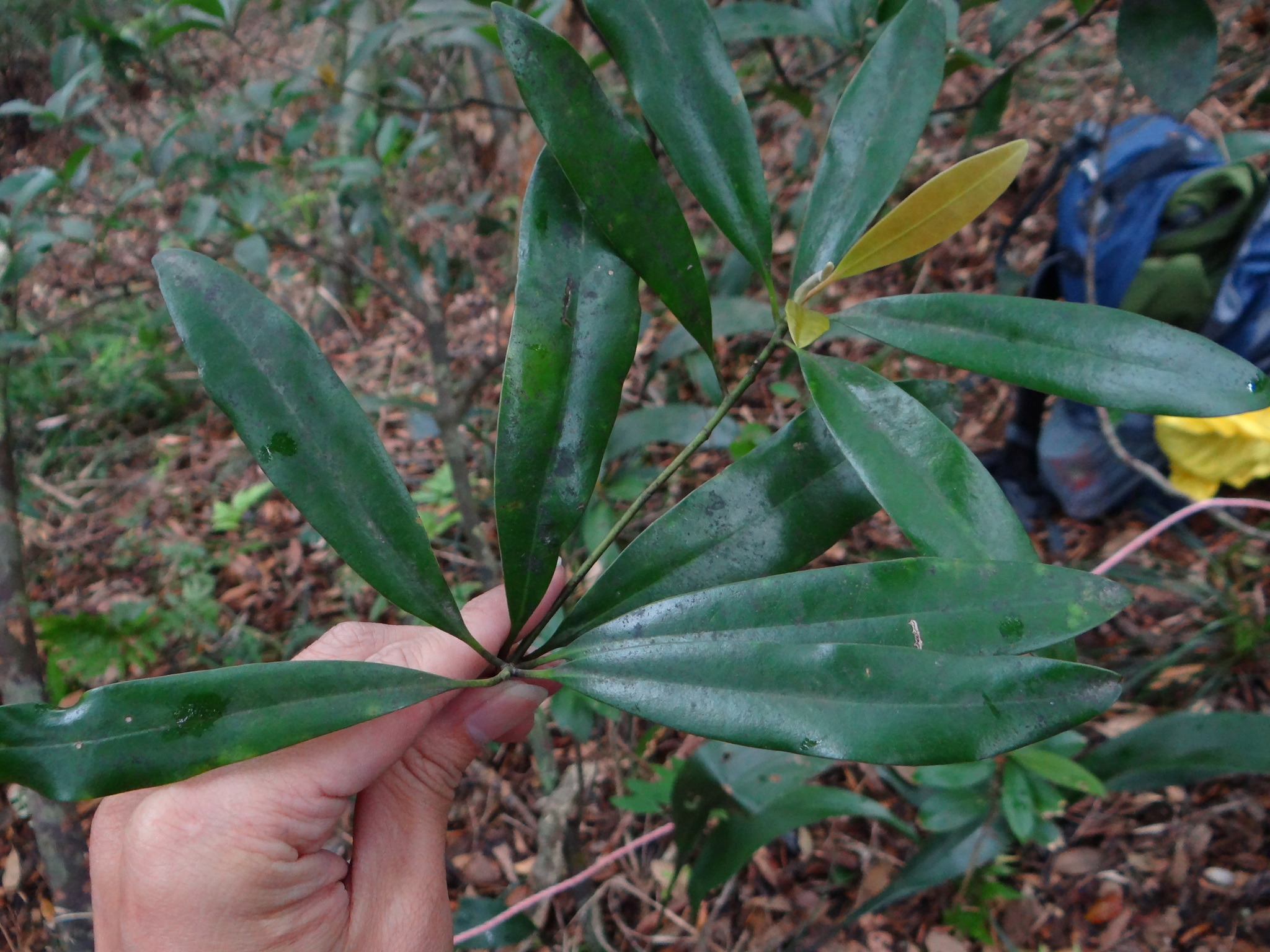

Conservation status
- Endangered (IUCN 3.1)

Scientific classification
- Kingdom: Plantae
- Clade: Embryophytes
- Clade: Tracheophytes
- Clade: Spermatophytes
- Clade: Angiosperms
- Clade: Magnoliids
- Order: Magnoliales
- Family: Magnoliaceae
- Genus: Magnolia
- Subgenus: Magnolia subg. Gynopodium
- Section: Magnolia sect. Gynopodium
- Species: M. kachirachirai

Binomial name
- Magnolia kachirachirai (Kaneh. & Yamam.) Dandy

Synonyms
- Michelia kachirachirai Kaneh. & Yamam.; Micheliopsis kachirachirai (Kaneh. & Yamam.) H.Keng; Pachylarnax kachirachirai (Kaneh. & Yamam.) Sima & S.G.Lu; Parakmeria kachirachirai (Kaneh. & Yamam.) Y.W.Law

= Magnolia kachirachirai =

Species of flowering plant

Magnolia kachirachirai (syn. Parakmeria kachirachirai) is a species of flowering plant in the family Magnoliaceae. It is endemic to southeastern Taiwan.

This is a tree growing up to 20 meters tall. The leathery oval-shaped leaves are up to 12 centimeters long. It bears bisexual flowers with whorls of yellow tepals and many stamens.

This species is known from just a few locations in fragmented habitat. Its populations are declining. Its habitat is cleared for human use and it is cut for timber. It is also grown as an ornamental.
