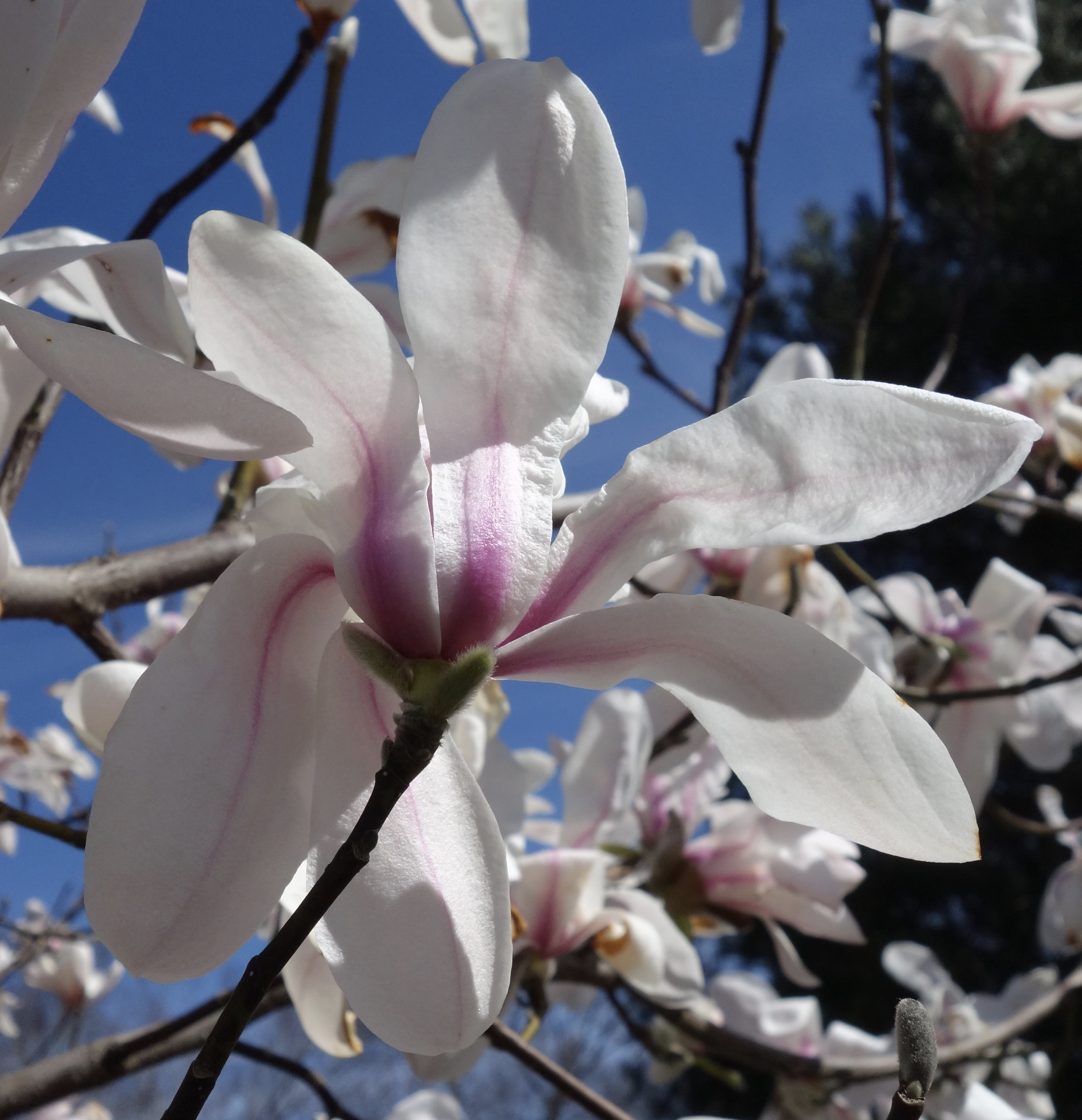
- Magnolia zenii 'Pink Parchment' Arnold Arboretum of Harvard University

Conservation status
- Critically Endangered (IUCN 3.1)

Scientific classification
- Kingdom: Plantae
- Clade: Embryophytes
- Clade: Tracheophytes
- Clade: Spermatophytes
- Clade: Angiosperms
- Clade: Magnoliids
- Order: Magnoliales
- Family: Magnoliaceae
- Genus: Magnolia
- Subgenus: Magnolia subg. Yulania
- Section: Magnolia sect. Yulania
- Subsection: Magnolia subsect. Yulania
- Species: M. zenii

Binomial name
- Magnolia zenii W.C.Cheng

= Magnolia zenii =

Species of tree

Magnolia zenii is a species of flowering plant in the family Magnoliaceae. It is a tree endemic to Henan and Jiangsu in southeastern China.

Listed as "critically endangered," there were only a few dozen found left of these when the variety was first discovered in China in 1931 according to MEG McCONAHEY writing in THE PRESS DEMOCRAT.

As of 2007, only a single population of 18 trees on the north slopes of Baohua Mountain near Zhenjiang had been documented.

== Taxonomy ==
Magnolia zenii was described by botanist Wan-Chun Cheng in 1933.

== Gallery ==
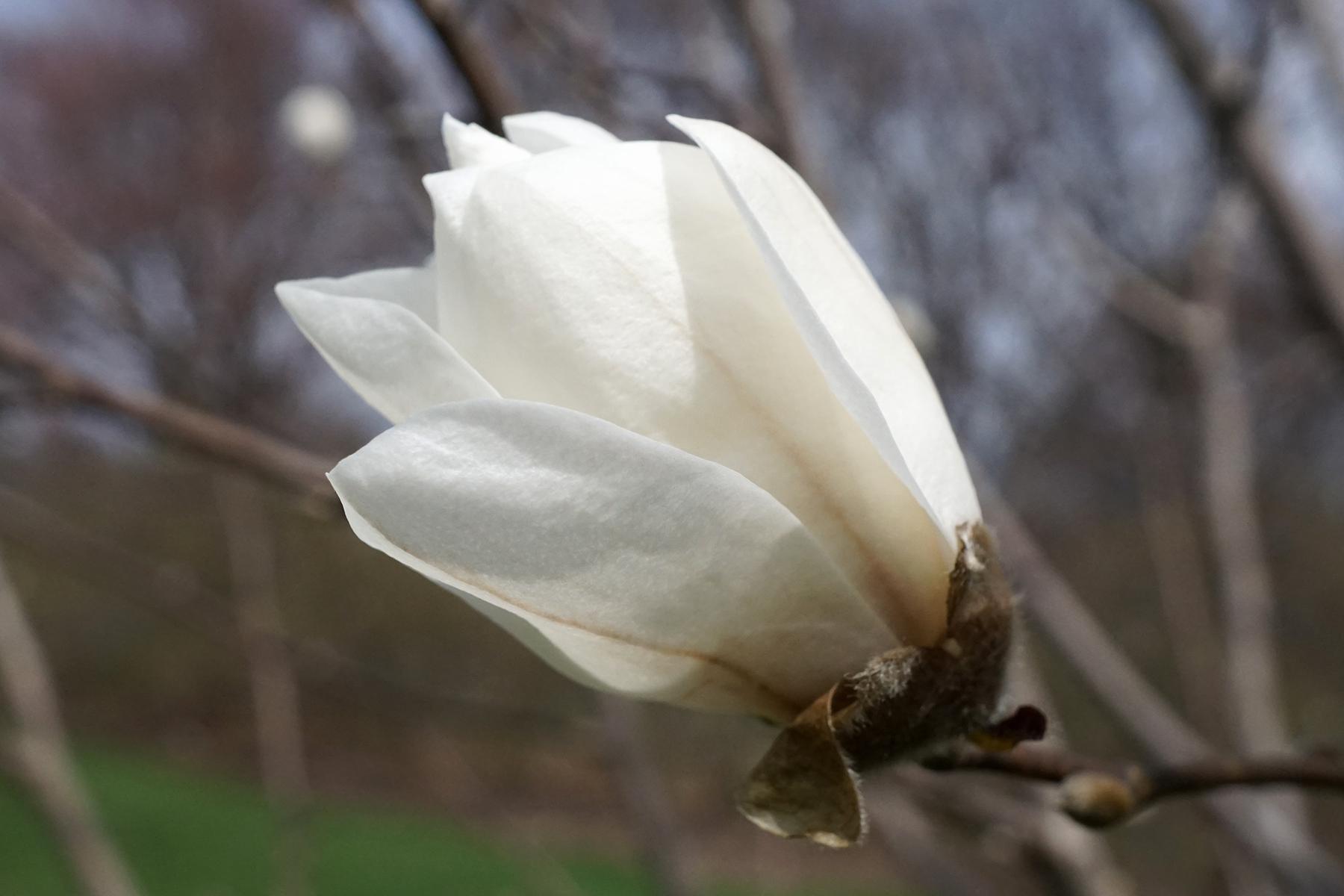
Flower

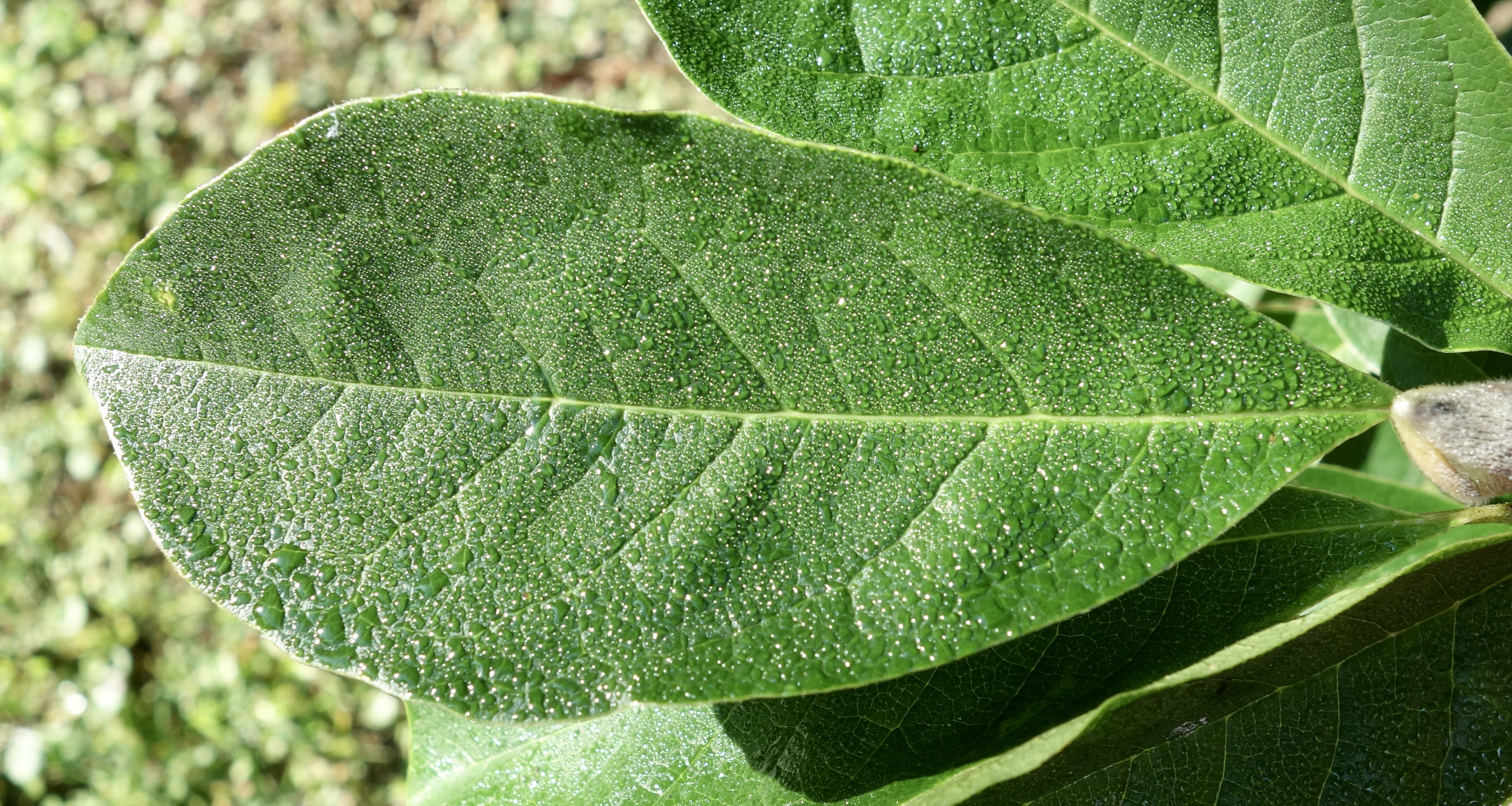
Leaf

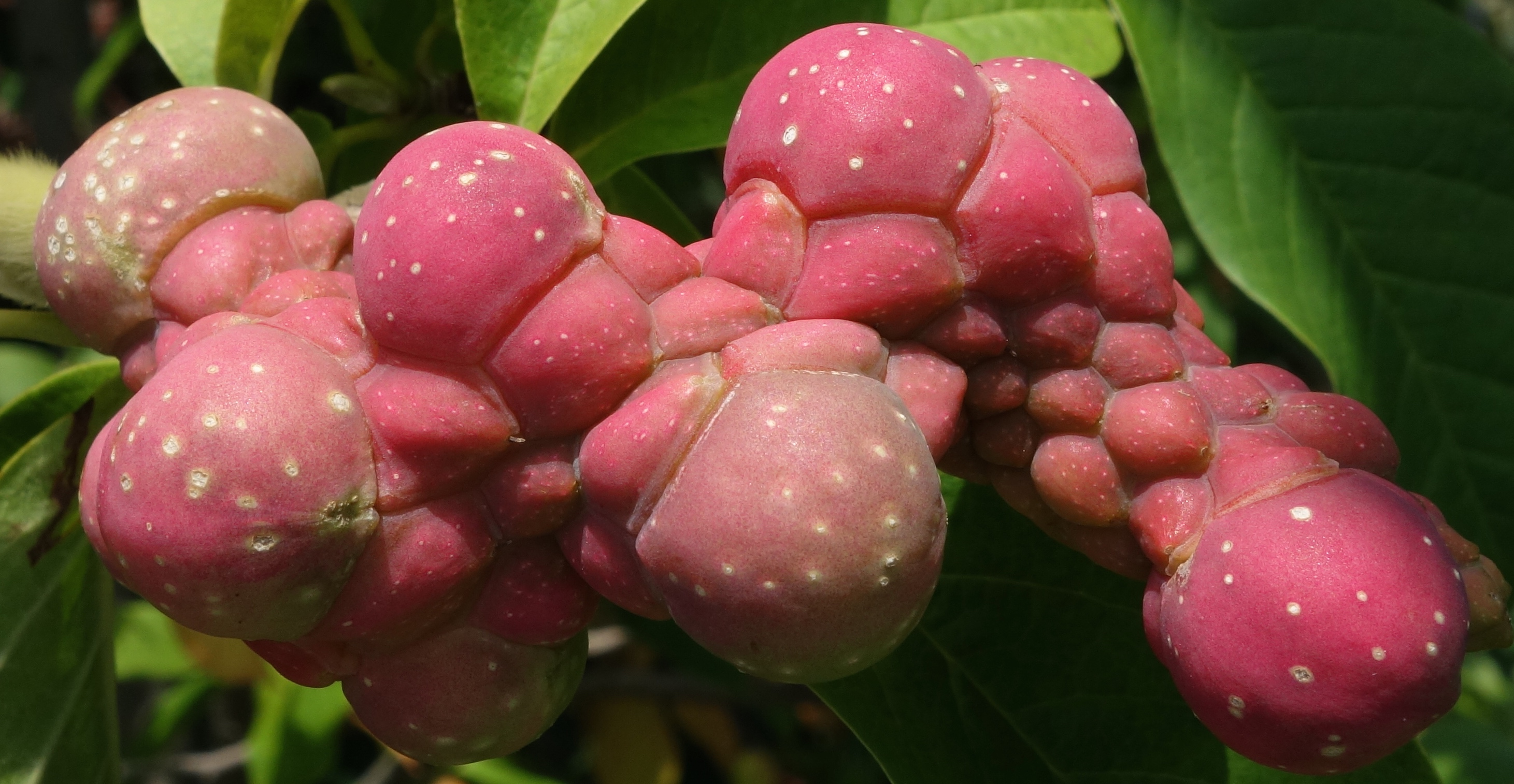
Maturing fruit

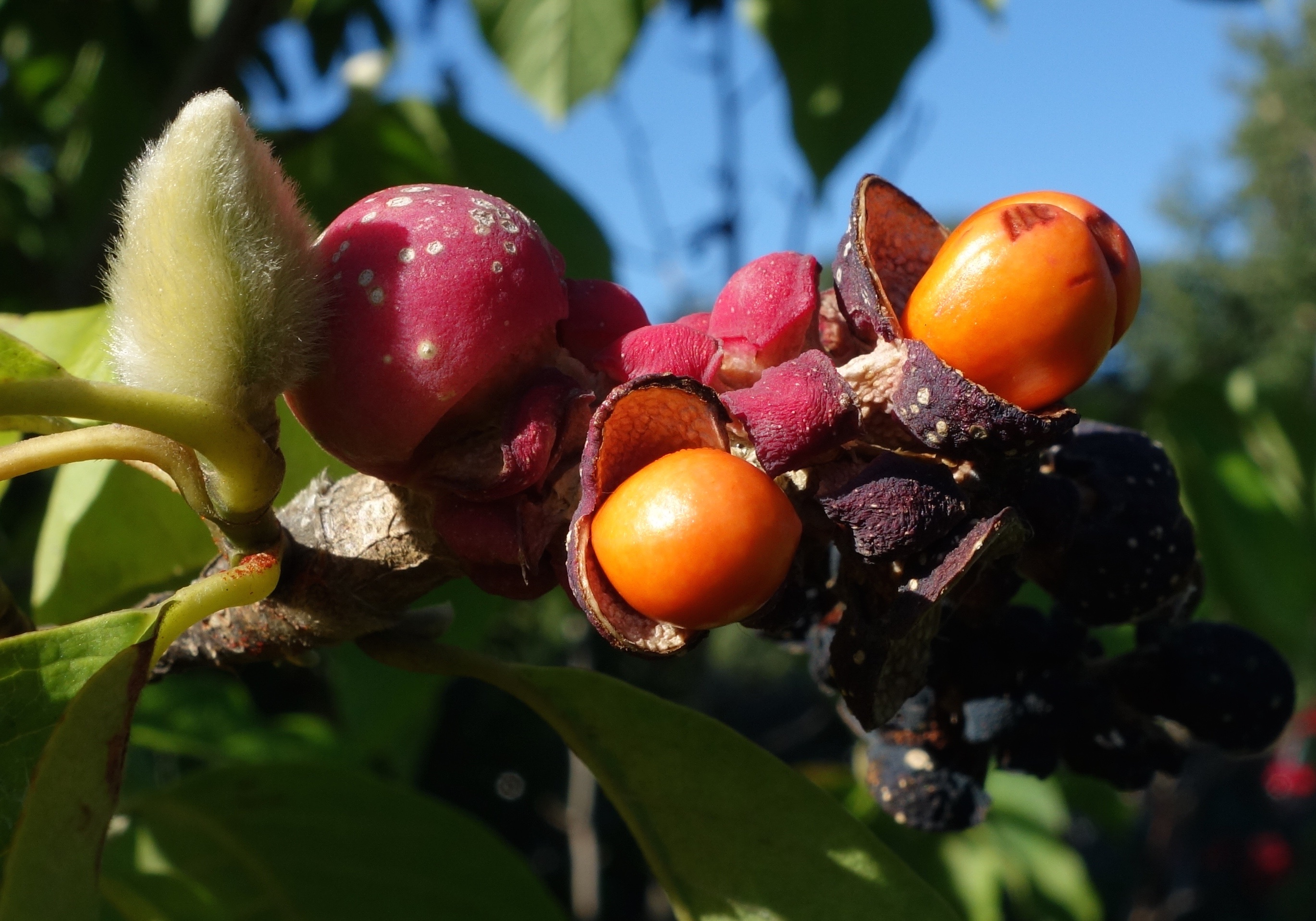
Mature fruit with seeds

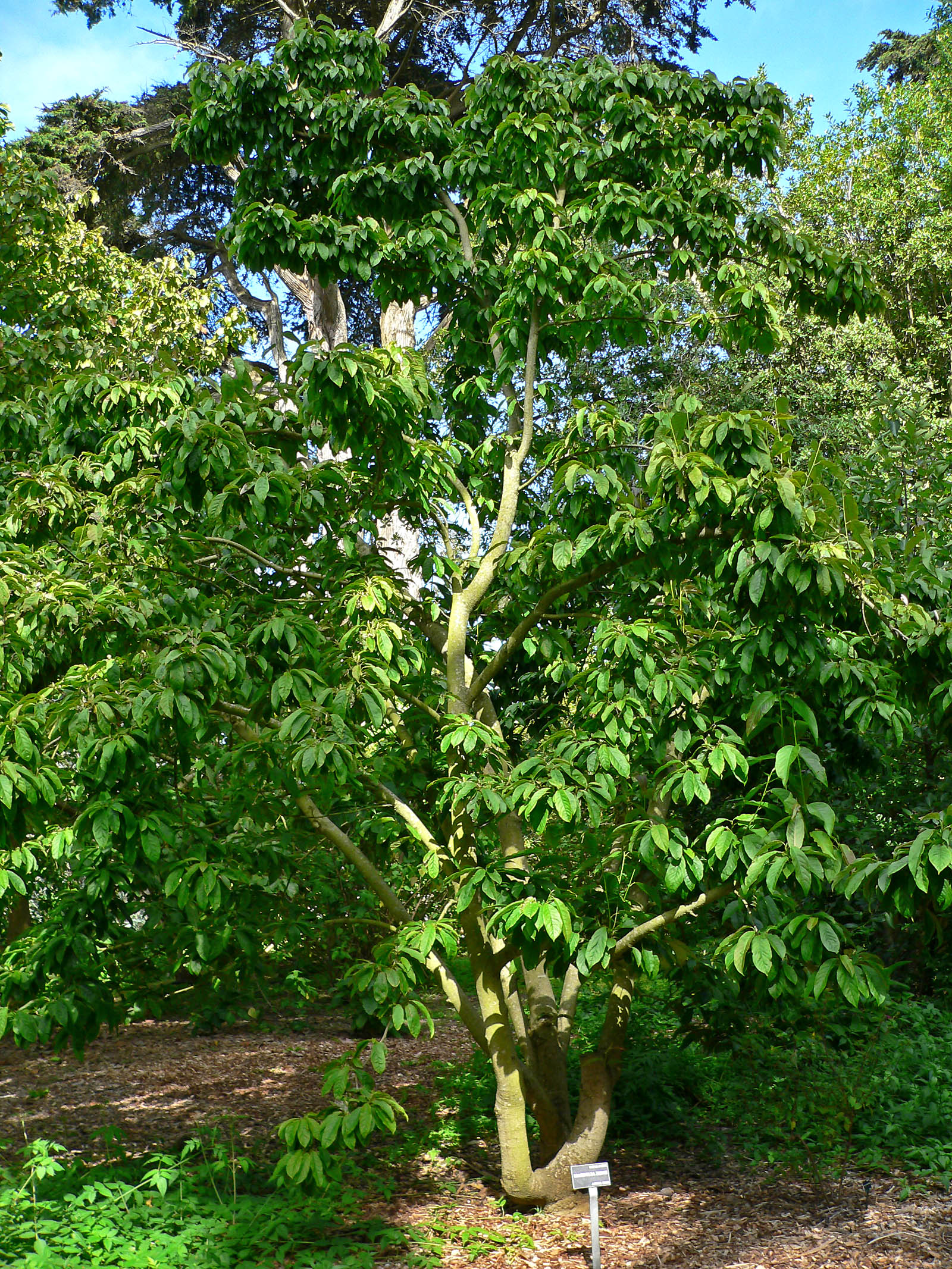
Photo of Magnolia zenii at the San Francisco Botanical Garden
