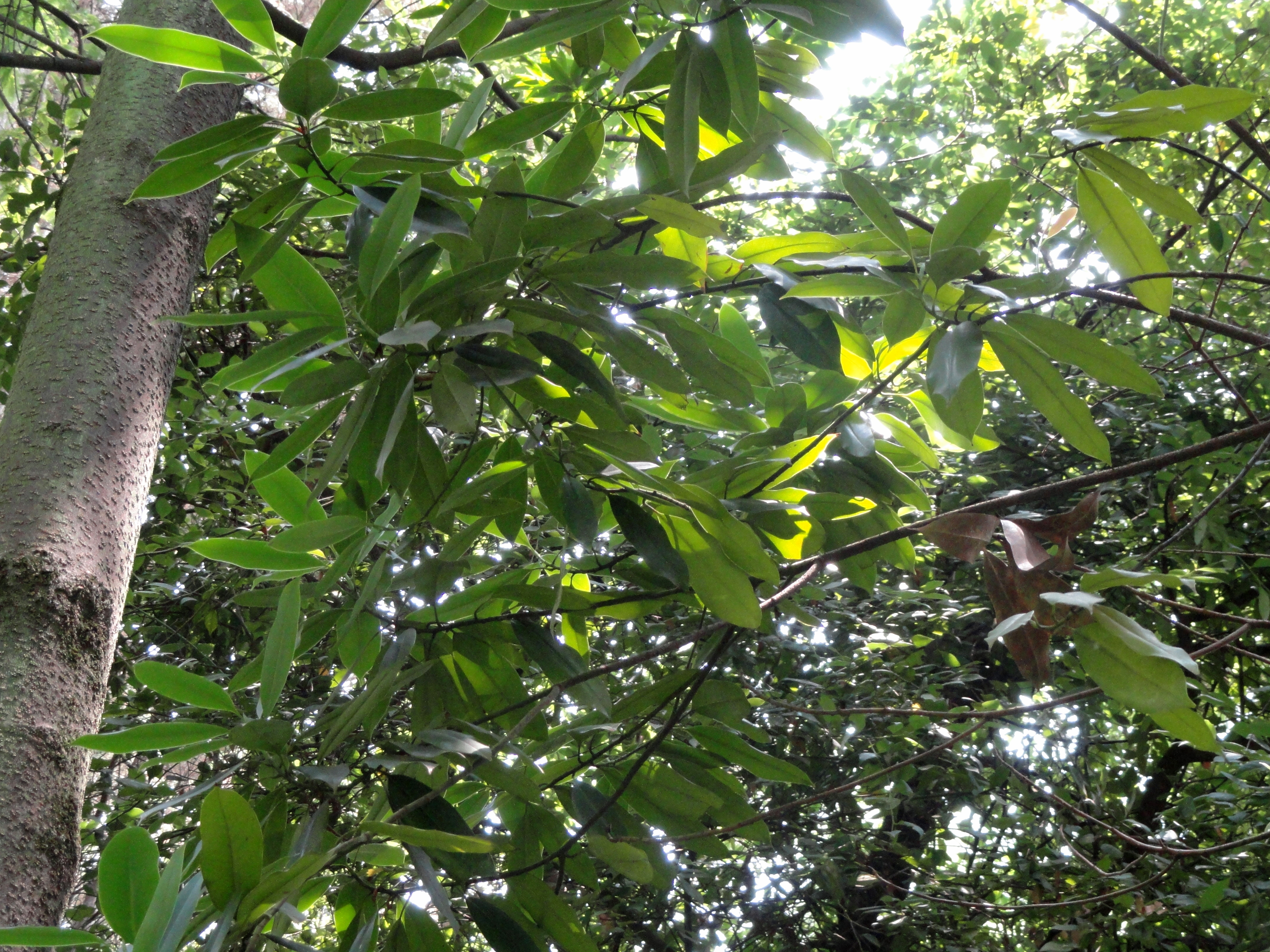

Conservation status
- Data Deficient (IUCN 3.1)

Scientific classification
- Kingdom: Plantae
- Clade: Embryophytes
- Clade: Tracheophytes
- Clade: Spermatophytes
- Clade: Angiosperms
- Clade: Magnoliids
- Order: Magnoliales
- Family: Magnoliaceae
- Genus: Magnolia
- Species: M. yunnanensis

Binomial name
- Magnolia yunnanensis (Hu) Noot.

Synonyms
- Magnolia nitida var. robusta B.L.Chen & Noot.; Magnolia robusta (B.L.Chen & Noot.) D.L.Fu; Pachylarnax yunnanensis (Hu) Sima & S.G.Lu; Pachylarnax yunnanensis var. robusta (B.L.Chen & Noot.) Sima; Parakmeria robusta (B.L.Chen & Noot.) Q.N.Vu & N.H.Xia; Parakmeria yunnanensis Hu

= Magnolia yunnanensis =

Species of tree

Magnolia yunnanensis is a species of tree in the family Magnoliaceae, native to evergreen broad-leaved forests of southern China and Vietnam.

Richard Figlar notes that Magnolia yunnanensis is "often cultivated as street trees in their native Yunnan because of their 'Gallery Pear-type' growth habit and their exceptionally glossy evergreen foliage". He also notes that "their flowers are not as profuse and are less showy than those of other magnolia species".

== Gallery ==
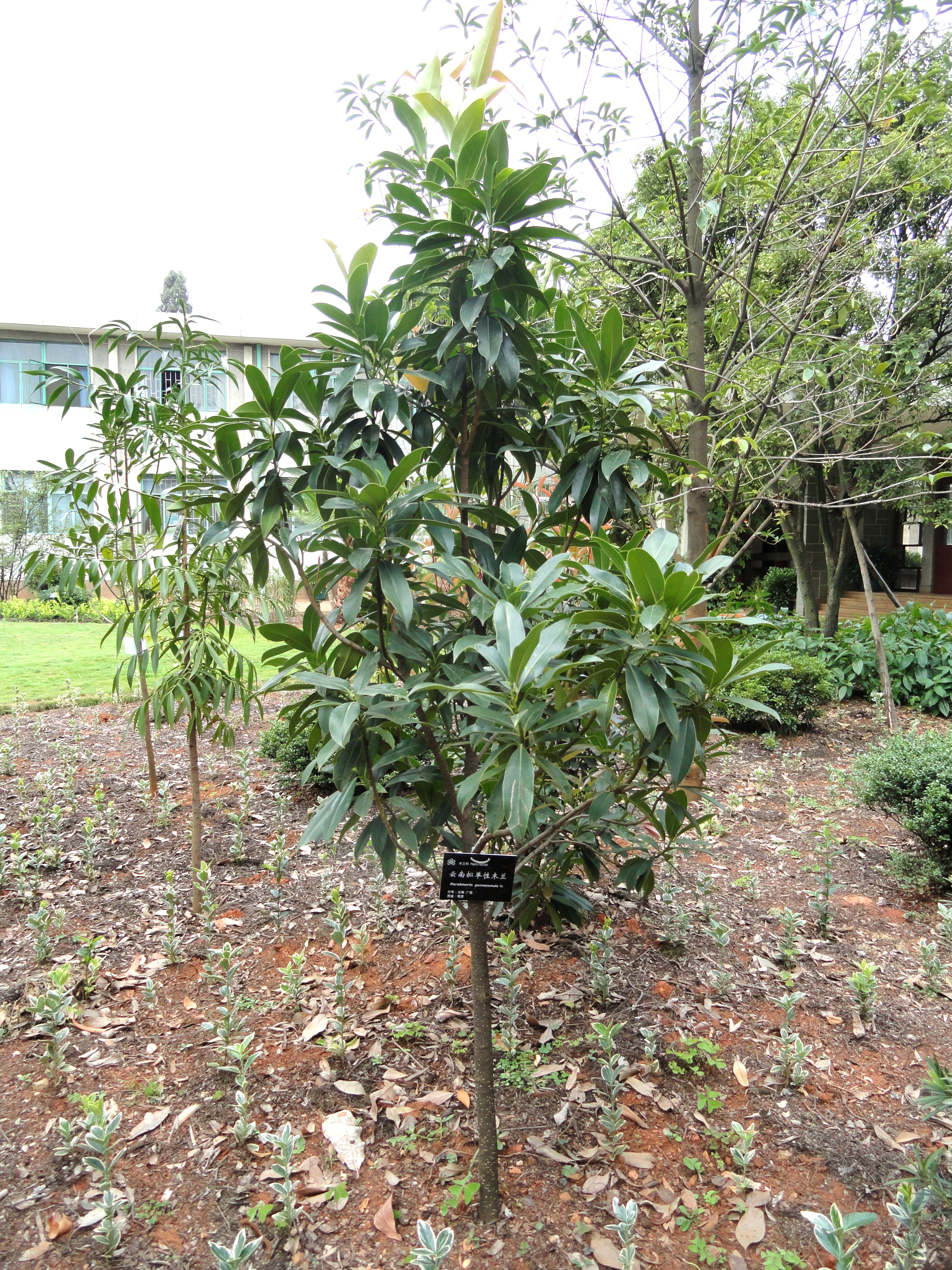

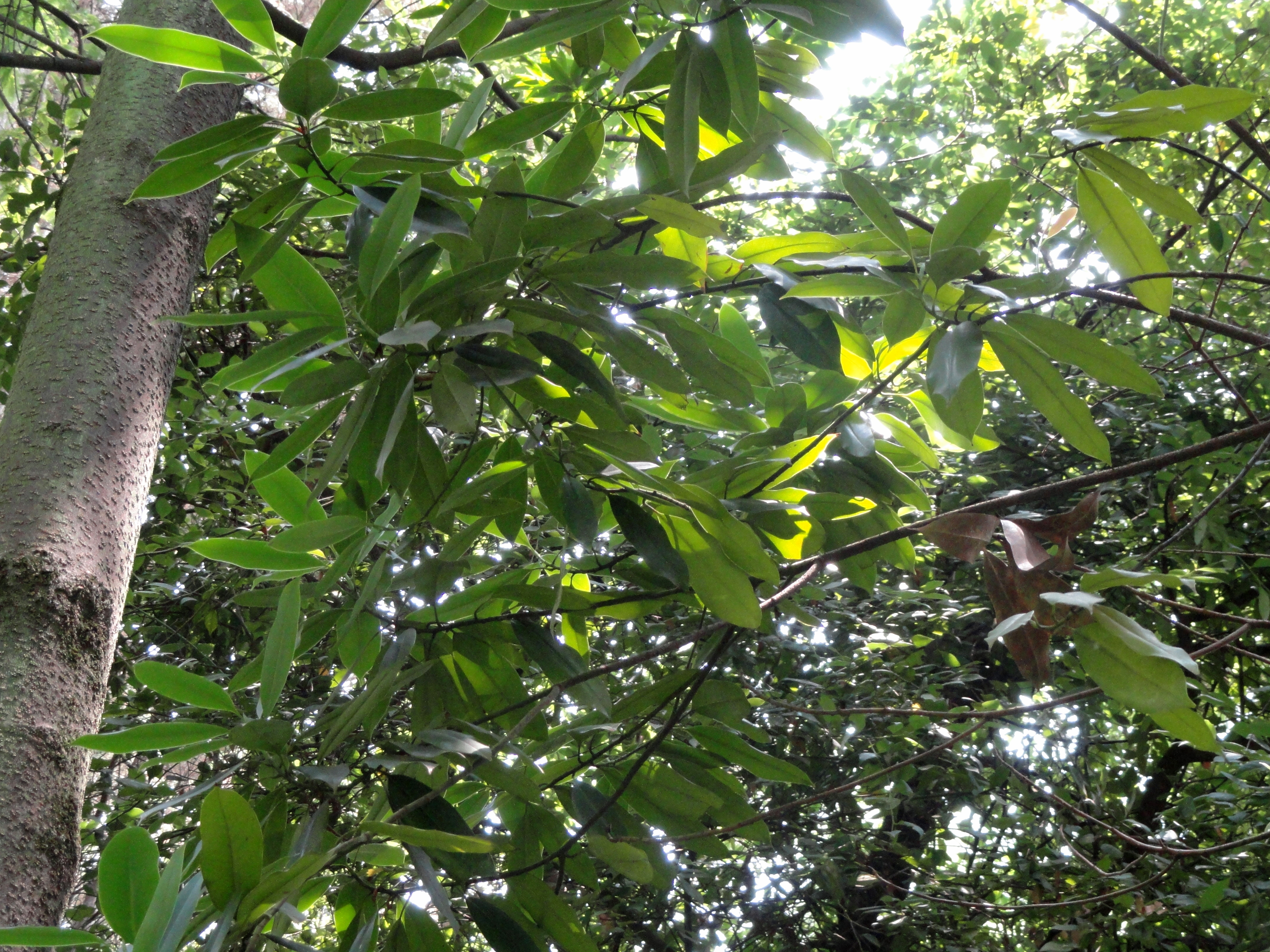

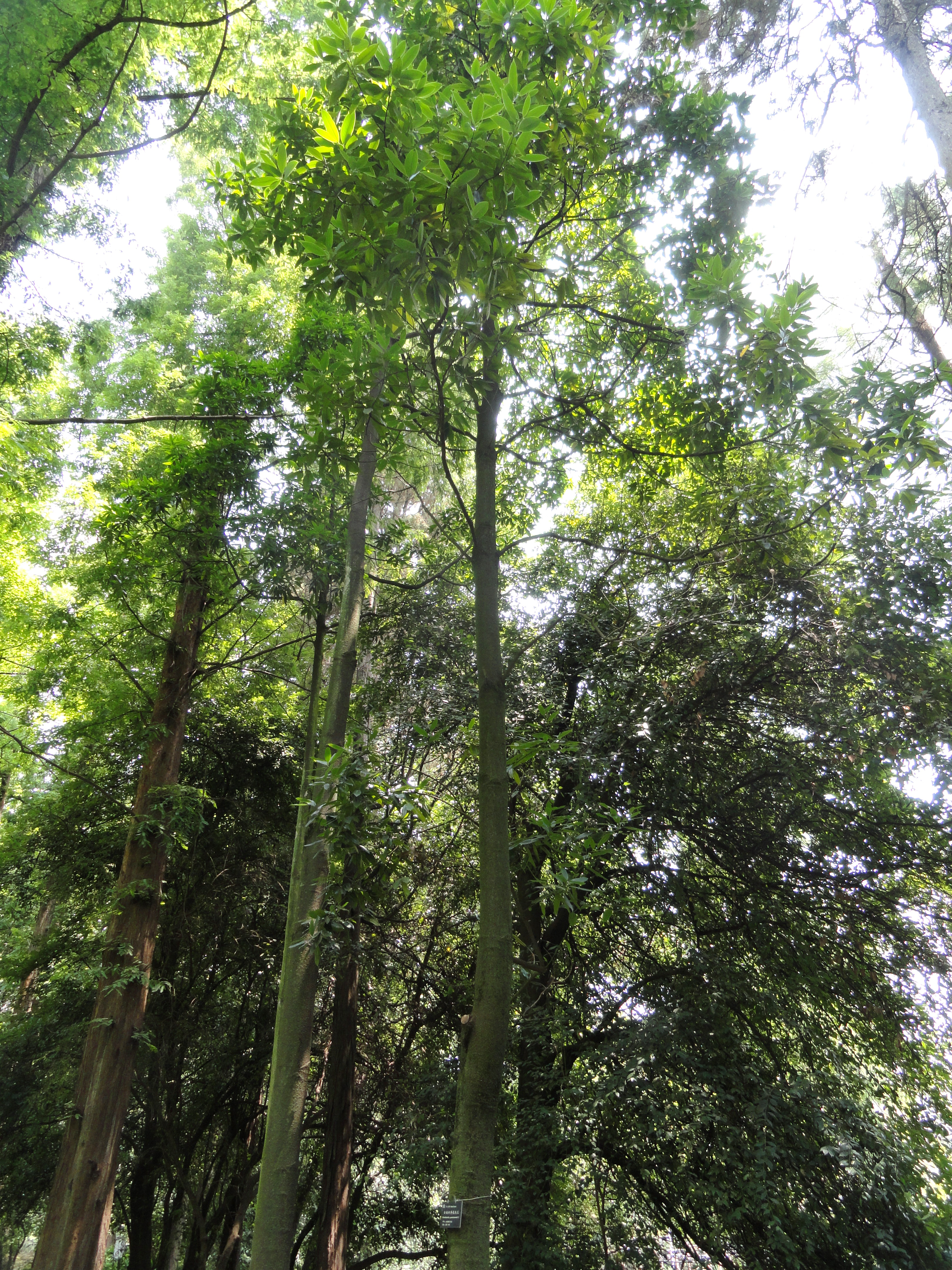
