= Magnolia aromatica =

Conservation status
- Endangered (IUCN 3.1)

Scientific classification
- Kingdom: Plantae
- Clade: Embryophytes
- Clade: Tracheophytes
- Clade: Spermatophytes
- Clade: Angiosperms
- Clade: Magnoliids
- Order: Magnoliales
- Family: Magnoliaceae
- Genus: Magnolia
- Species: M. aromatica

Binomial name
- Magnolia aromatica (Dandy) V.S.Kumar

Synonyms
- Manglietia aromatica Dandy; Paramanglietia aromatica (Dandy) Hu & W.C.Cheng

Species of flowering plant

Magnolia aromatica is a species of flowering plant in the family Magnoliaceae. It is a tree native to southern China (Yunnan, Guizhou, and Guangxi) and southern Vietnam. It is threatened by habitat loss.
