= Magnolia fistulosa =

Conservation status
- Data Deficient (IUCN 3.1)

Scientific classification
- Kingdom: Plantae
- Clade: Embryophytes
- Clade: Tracheophytes
- Clade: Spermatophytes
- Clade: Angiosperms
- Clade: Magnoliids
- Order: Magnoliales
- Family: Magnoliaceae
- Genus: Magnolia
- Subgenus: Magnolia subg. Magnolia
- Section: Magnolia sect. Gwillimia
- Subsection: Magnolia subsect. Gwillimia
- Species: M. fistulosa

Binomial name
- Magnolia fistulosa (Finet & Gagnep.) Dandy

Synonyms
- Lirianthe fistulosa (Finet & Gagnep.) N.H.Xia & C.Y.Wu; Magnolia championii subsp. fistulosa (Finet & Gagnep.) J.Li; Talauma fistulosa Finet & Gagnep.; Lirianthe phanerophlebia (B.L.Chen) Sima; Magnolia phanerophlebia B.L.Chen; Magnolia talaumoides Dandy

Species of flowering plant

Magnolia fistulosa is a species of plant in the family Magnoliaceae. It is endemic to China.
