= Magnolia pleiocarpa =

Conservation status
- Critically Endangered (IUCN 3.1)

Scientific classification
- Kingdom: Plantae
- Clade: Tracheophytes
- Clade: Angiosperms
- Clade: Magnoliids
- Order: Magnoliales
- Family: Magnoliaceae
- Genus: Magnolia
- Subgenus: Magnolia subg. Gynopodium
- Section: Magnolia sect. Manglietiastrum
- Species: M. pleiocarpa

Binomial name
- Magnolia pleiocarpa (Dandy) Figlar & Noot.

Synonyms
- Pachylarnax pleiocarpa Dandy

Species of flowering plant

Magnolia pleiocarpa is a species of plant in the family Magnoliaceae. It is endemic to the montane forests near Lakhimpur in the state of Assam in India. It is threatened by habitat loss.
