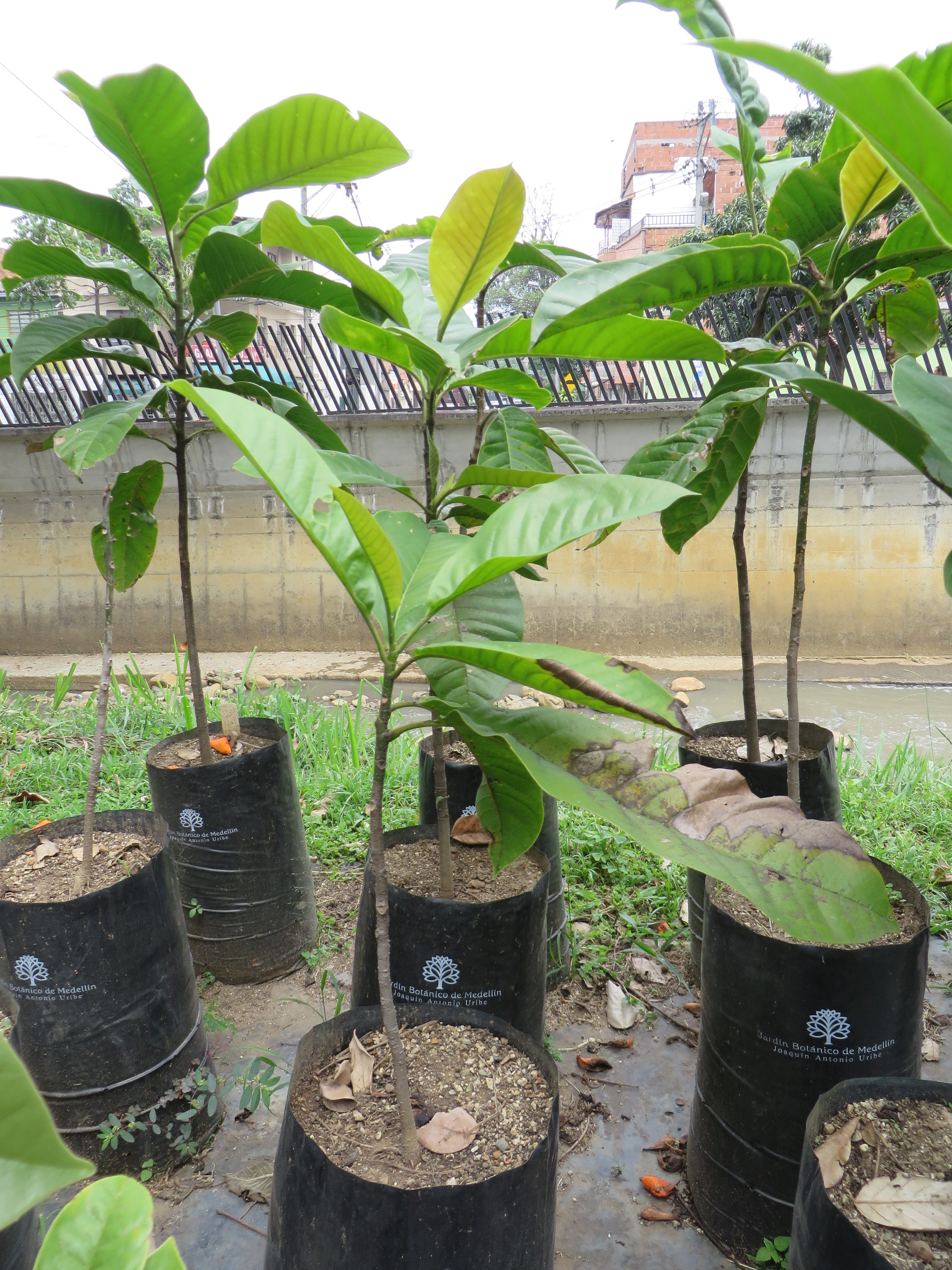

Conservation status
- Critically Endangered (IUCN 3.1)

Scientific classification
- Kingdom: Plantae
- Clade: Embryophytes
- Clade: Tracheophytes
- Clade: Spermatophytes
- Clade: Angiosperms
- Clade: Magnoliids
- Order: Magnoliales
- Family: Magnoliaceae
- Genus: Magnolia
- Section: Magnolia sect. Talauma
- Species: M. jardinensis

Binomial name
- Magnolia jardinensis M.Serna, C.Velásquez & Cogollo

= Magnolia jardinensis =

Species of tree

Magnolia jardinensis is a tree native to Colombia and endangered due to its exploitation. Common names include Gallinazo blanco, copachí and centello.

== Description ==
This tree can reach a height of up to 25 m and up to 60 cm in diameter. The bark is grey coloured with dark streaks. Young leaves have a woolly and golden pubescence. Leaves are spiralled, elliptic and chartaceous, 15.3 cm to 34 cm in length and 10.6 to 21.4 cm in width. They have a dense, golden pubescence on the underside, with a petiole streaked longitudinally. Flowers are cream-coloured, with a floral bud with three pubescent bracts, three sepals and eight pulpy petals. Fruits are small and elliptical.

== Distribution and habitat ==
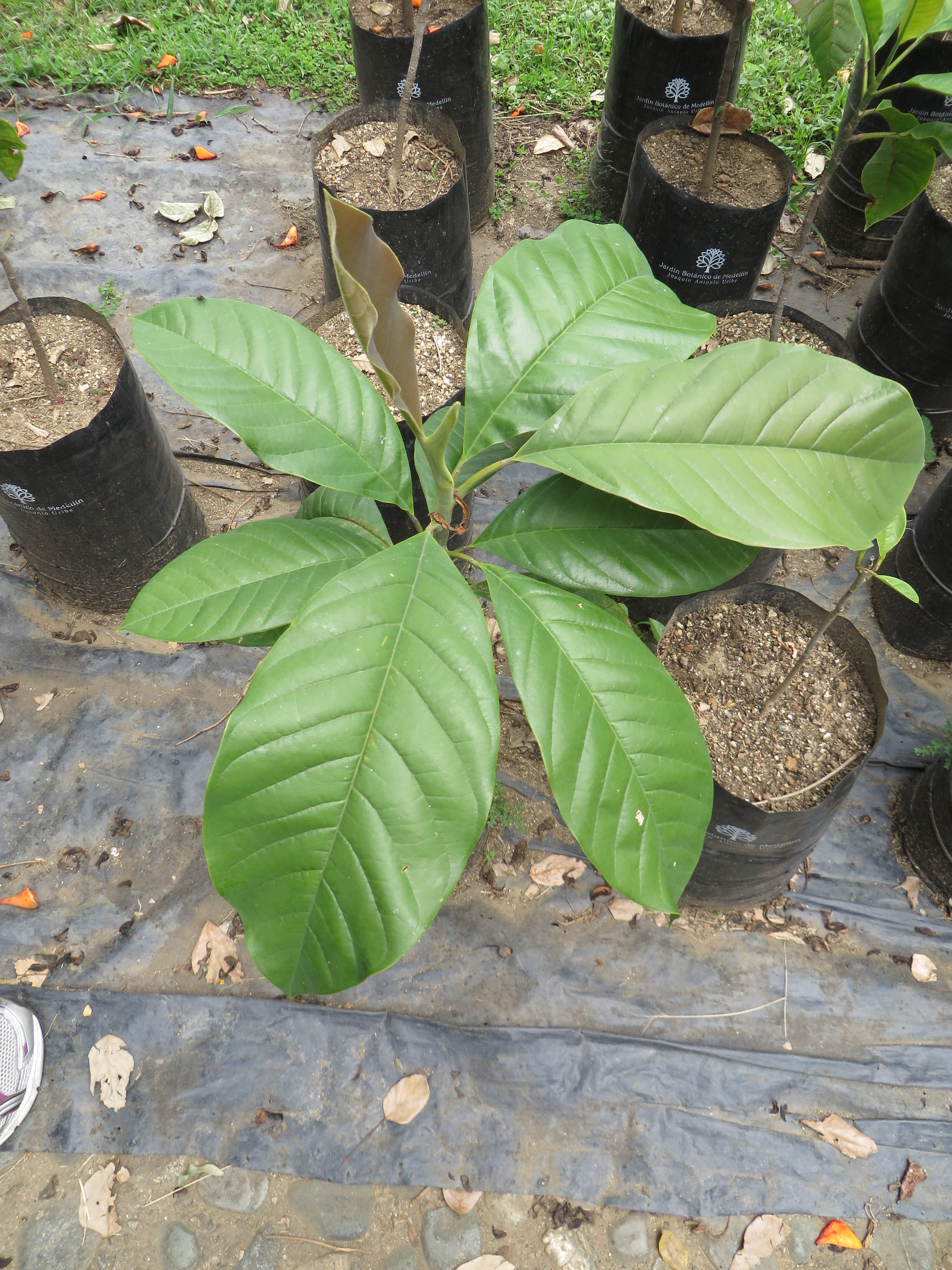
Seedling of M. jardinensis

The tree is endemic to the Colombian department of Antioquia. It grows in tropical forest and in very wet low mountain forest, in the western cordillera of Jardín, between 1,900 and 2,800m altitude.

== Uses ==
In the past it was probably a very sought-after logged timber species, similar to others species of its family.

== Conservation status ==
Magnolia jardinensis was classified as a critically endangered species (CR) by the Red book of Colombian plants, which is due to its distributional range and because the population is very small.

== Flowering and fruiting ==
The tree has flowers almost the whole year, with a slight decrease of the reproductive output during the month of June. It offers an abundant flowering with floral buds and opened flowers covering more than 20% of the top. Insects pollinate the flowers. The production of fruits is low, which is due to numerous miscarriages during this process. During the rainy season (December to February and August to September) the production of fruits increases. Seeds are scattered by birds and small mammals.
