= Magnolia gustavii =

Conservation status
- Critically Endangered (IUCN 3.1)

Scientific classification
- Kingdom: Plantae
- Clade: Embryophytes
- Clade: Tracheophytes
- Clade: Spermatophytes
- Clade: Angiosperms
- Clade: Magnoliids
- Order: Magnoliales
- Family: Magnoliaceae
- Genus: Magnolia
- Subgenus: Magnolia subg. Yulania
- Section: Magnolia sect. Michelia
- Subsection: Magnolia subsect. Maingola
- Species: M. gustavii

Binomial name
- Magnolia gustavii King

Synonyms
- Aromadendron gustavi (King) Sima & S.G.Lu

Species of flowering plant

Magnolia gustavii is a species of flowering plant in the family Magnoliaceae. It is native to the Assam region, Myanmar and Thailand.
