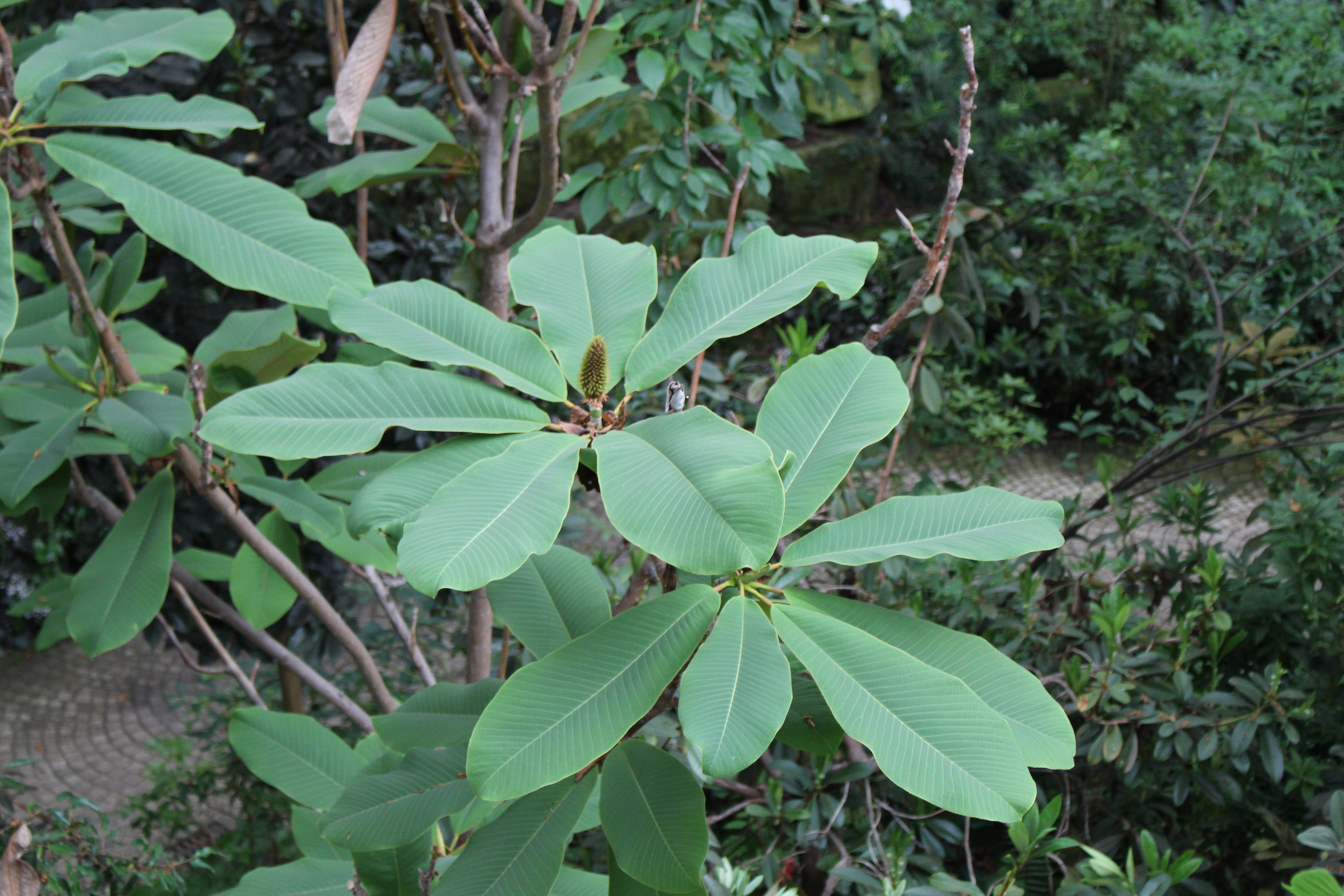
- Leaves and immature fruit

Conservation status
- Endangered (IUCN 3.1)

Scientific classification
- Kingdom: Plantae
- Clade: Embryophytes
- Clade: Tracheophytes
- Clade: Spermatophytes
- Clade: Angiosperms
- Clade: Magnoliids
- Order: Magnoliales
- Family: Magnoliaceae
- Genus: Magnolia
- Subgenus: Magnolia subg. Magnolia
- Section: Magnolia sect. Rhytidospermum
- Subsection: Magnolia subsect. Rhytidospermum
- Species: M. rostrata

Binomial name
- Magnolia rostrata W.W.Sm.

Synonyms
- Houpoea rostrata (W.W.Sm.) N.H.Xia & C.Y.Wu

= Magnolia rostrata =

Species of tree

Magnolia rostrata, the beaked magnolia, is a species of flowering plant in the family Magnoliaceae. It is a tree native to the Himalayas of southeastern Tibet, western Yunnan, and northeastern Myanmar. It is an IUCN Red List endangered species, threatened by habitat loss.

== Description ==
The tree's leaves are to 50 cm long by 20–30 cm wide. It has melon scented flowers in summer, white with some pink. According to Backyard Gardener, it can reach in height up too 50–100 feet.

== Cultivation ==
Magnolia rostrata is grown as an ornamental tree in gardens.
