= Magnolia xanthantha =

Conservation status
- Endangered (IUCN 3.1)

Scientific classification
- Kingdom: Plantae
- Clade: Embryophytes
- Clade: Tracheophytes
- Clade: Spermatophytes
- Clade: Angiosperms
- Clade: Magnoliids
- Order: Magnoliales
- Family: Magnoliaceae
- Genus: Magnolia
- Subgenus: Magnolia subg. Yulania
- Section: Magnolia sect. Michelia
- Subsection: Magnolia subsect. Michelia
- Species: M. xanthantha

Binomial name
- Magnolia xanthantha (C.Y.Wu ex Y.W.Law & Y.F.Wu) Figlar

Synonyms
- Michelia xanthantha C.Y.Wu ex Y.W.Law & Y.F.Wu

Species of tree

Magnolia xanthantha is a species of flowering plant in the family Magnoliaceae. It is a tree endemic to southern Yunnan in south-central China. It is known only from its type specimen, collected in 1957 from Menghai County in Xishuangbanna, and described in 1988.
