= Magnolia calimaensis =

Conservation status
- Critically Endangered (IUCN 3.1)

Scientific classification
- Kingdom: Plantae
- Clade: Embryophytes
- Clade: Tracheophytes
- Clade: Spermatophytes
- Clade: Angiosperms
- Clade: Magnoliids
- Order: Magnoliales
- Family: Magnoliaceae
- Genus: Magnolia
- Section: Magnolia sect. Talauma
- Subsection: Magnolia subsect. Dugandiodendron
- Species: M. calimaensis

Binomial name
- Magnolia calimaensis (Lozano) Goavaerts

Synonyms
- Dugandiodendron calimaense Lozano

Species of flowering plant

Magnolia calimaensis is a species of flowering plant in the family Magnoliaceae. It is endemic to Colombia, where it is known from a single location. It is a tree which makes up part of the canopy in tropical forest habitat. Its common name is almagnegra del Calima.
