= Magnolia guatapensis =

Conservation status
- Endangered (IUCN 3.1)

Scientific classification
- Kingdom: Plantae
- Clade: Embryophytes
- Clade: Tracheophytes
- Clade: Spermatophytes
- Clade: Angiosperms
- Clade: Magnoliids
- Order: Magnoliales
- Family: Magnoliaceae
- Genus: Magnolia
- Section: Magnolia sect. Talauma
- Subsection: Magnolia subsect. Dugandiodendron
- Species: M. guatapensis

Binomial name
- Magnolia guatapensis (Lozano) Govaerts

Synonyms
- Dugandiodendron guatapense Lozano

Species of flowering plant

Magnolia guatapensis is a species of flowering plant in the family Magnoliaceae. It is a tree endemic to Antioquia Department of Colombia. Common names include: almanegra, almanegra de Guatapé.

== Description ==
The tree can be reaching up to 34 m height and 37 cm in diameter. The wood presents fine texture and yellow-green color, the color of the grain varies from black to olive green. Leaves are alternate, simple, spirally arranged, oval, texture varies from papiraceous to chartaceous, with slightly emarginated apex, linear scars caused by prefoliation/vernation. The top of the leaf is shiny and the bottom is covered by indumentum (cream colored, very short) and is also present on the twigs internodes. Terminal flowers, hermaphrodites; floral buds are covered by spataceous bracts; present 3 sepals, one is external, the next one is intern-external and the third one is totally internal. It has 10 obovate fleshy petals colored yellowish green. Woody fruit, elliptic, green color, measuring from 3 to 4 cm long and from 2,4 to 2,8 cm broad; the carpels split open irregularly. Each fruit contains around from 13 to 20 seeds and some of them might not be completely formed.

== Habitat and local distribution ==
It is endemic of Antioquia Department, Colombia, it can be found in two localities of the central Andes, in the east plateau (altiplano) and in the north plateau (altiplano), between 1,800 and 2,300 metres elevation. It occurs in humid montane forests and humid pre-montane forests. Usually it can be found dispersed in small forest patches or as lonely trees on pasture lands. It was reported in Angostura, Valdivia and Yarumal Municipalities.

== Uses ==
It has been widely used in carpentry and woodworking, furniture making, floor, beams. It has great potential for ornamental uses.

== Conservation ==
It is listed in the category "Endangered" (EN) in the Red Book of Plants of Colombia. and also as "Endangered" (EN) by the IUCN Red List of Threatened Species.This is due to the species occurrence in an area smaller than 5.000 km2 and which is reducing due to land clearing for agriculture and cattle grazing.

== Reproductive phenology ==
Magnolia guatapensis produces flower buds almost along the whole year, presenting higher production at the beginning of the rainy season in April and May. According to monitoring activities, a high percentage of flower buds are aborted before becoming a flower. Fruit formation derived from the few remained flowers can take from 4 to 5 months. Although throughout the year the presence of flowers and fruits are observed in different stages of formation, harvest is done during the months of high rainfall such as August and September.

== Seed management, sexual propagation and nursery production ==
=== Fruit and seed description ===
It is a woody fruit, elliptic, green colored, measuring from 3 to 4 cm long and from 2,4 to 2,8 cm broad. Each fruit has 13 to 20 seeds and some of them can be formed completely. The seeds are smooth, dark brown, measuring from 13 to 20 mm broad, 6,2 to 10,8 mm long and 3,1 and 4,2 mm tick. The seeds are covered by an aromatic reddish fleshy layer named sarcotesta. The moister content of fresh seeds is around 35,3%. 1'000 seeds weight from 108 to 125 grams and 1 kilogram can have from 8'000 to 9'260 seeds.

=== Collecting and processing the fruits ===
Fruit harvest is made during August and September, which are months with high rainfall. Since the fruits are dehiscent, it is recommended to harvest the fruits directly from the trees before they open to release the seeds when they are still green, but opening lines can already be seen. If the tree is not too high, harvest can be done using an extension pruning pole. However, if the canopy is not reachable from the ground, fruits and seeds can be collected from the ground, always taking care to eliminate seeds and fruits with fungus presence or holes caused by insects. Climbing trees is another way to collect the fruits because they can be harvested when they are still closed and they dehiscent after being picked. In some cases it is possible to collect seeds that are hanging from open fruits on the trees. Seeds transportation or seed storage should be done using sealed plastic bags together with wet sawdust and kept in a cool place. Once the fruits have dehiscence, mature seeds are extracted and the ones with good phytosanitary conditions are selected. In order to remove the red sacotesta covering the seeds, they should be immersed in cold water for 24 hours, then macerated and rinsed with water.

=== Seed storage ===
According to previous studies it has been possible to determine that seeds are very sensitive to the desiccation and for this reason it is advisable to avoid to store them. They have to be sowed immediately after the collection.

=== Sowing and germination ===
The germination capacity of fresh seeds is very variable. In different tests done with the same substratum (mix of soil and sand, 2:1 proportion), very distinct germination values: between 25 and 73% of germination capacity have been reached. On the other hand, concerning the previous hydration of the seeds during 17 hours before sowing, the hydration held up the germination for up to one month. Nevertheless, the germination capacity did not change: Before sowing, it is advisable to stir the sarcotesta of the seeds, clean it with running water and emerge it into a solution of 1% sodium hypochlorite during 45 minutes to avoid fungal infestations. The germination is epigeous, starts 56 to 64 days after sowing and is completed 20 days later.

=== Handling of seedlings in nursery ===
For a better dissemination It is recommendable to use a mix of soil and sand in 2:1 proportion. Once seedlings reached 4 cm of height we can move it to a bag. After this process, it is advisable to leave the plants under shade and reduce it gradually. When seedlings reach 25 cm of height and have been hardened at least a little, we can consider that they are ready to be planted definitively at the field.
