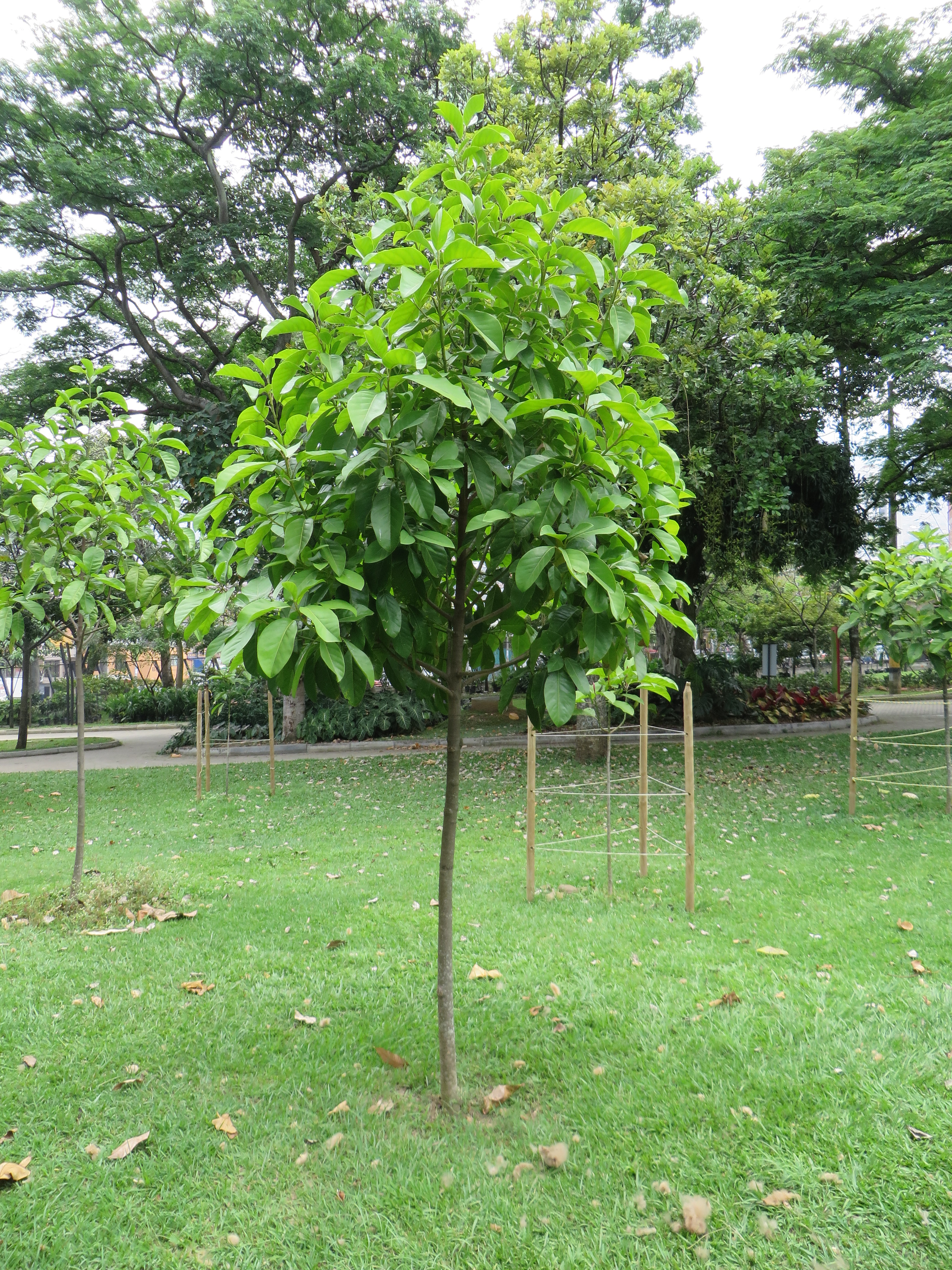

Conservation status
- Endangered (IUCN 3.1)

Scientific classification
- Kingdom: Plantae
- Clade: Embryophytes
- Clade: Tracheophytes
- Clade: Spermatophytes
- Clade: Angiosperms
- Clade: Magnoliids
- Order: Magnoliales
- Family: Magnoliaceae
- Genus: Magnolia
- Section: Magnolia sect. Talauma
- Species: M. silvioi

Binomial name
- Magnolia silvioi (Lozano) Govaerts

Synonyms
- Talauma silvioi Lozano

= Magnolia silvioi =

Species of flowering plant

Magnolia silvioi is a species of Magnolia tree endemic to Antioquia Department of Colombia. Common names include guanábano de monte, fruta de molinillo, and guanabanillo.

== Description ==
They are trees reaching up to 35 m height and 100 cm in diameter. Leaves alternate, simple, spirally arranged, coriaceous, elliptic, measuring from 11 to 26 cm long and from 7,4 to 12 cm wide; petiole greatly thickened at the base and present a scar that cover it completely. Flowers have cream color, two bracts up to 5 cm long covering the flower bud; three sepals and seven petals. The fruits are subglobose to ovoid, large, up to 16 cm long; 1-2 seeds per carpel with red cover.

== Distribution and habitat ==
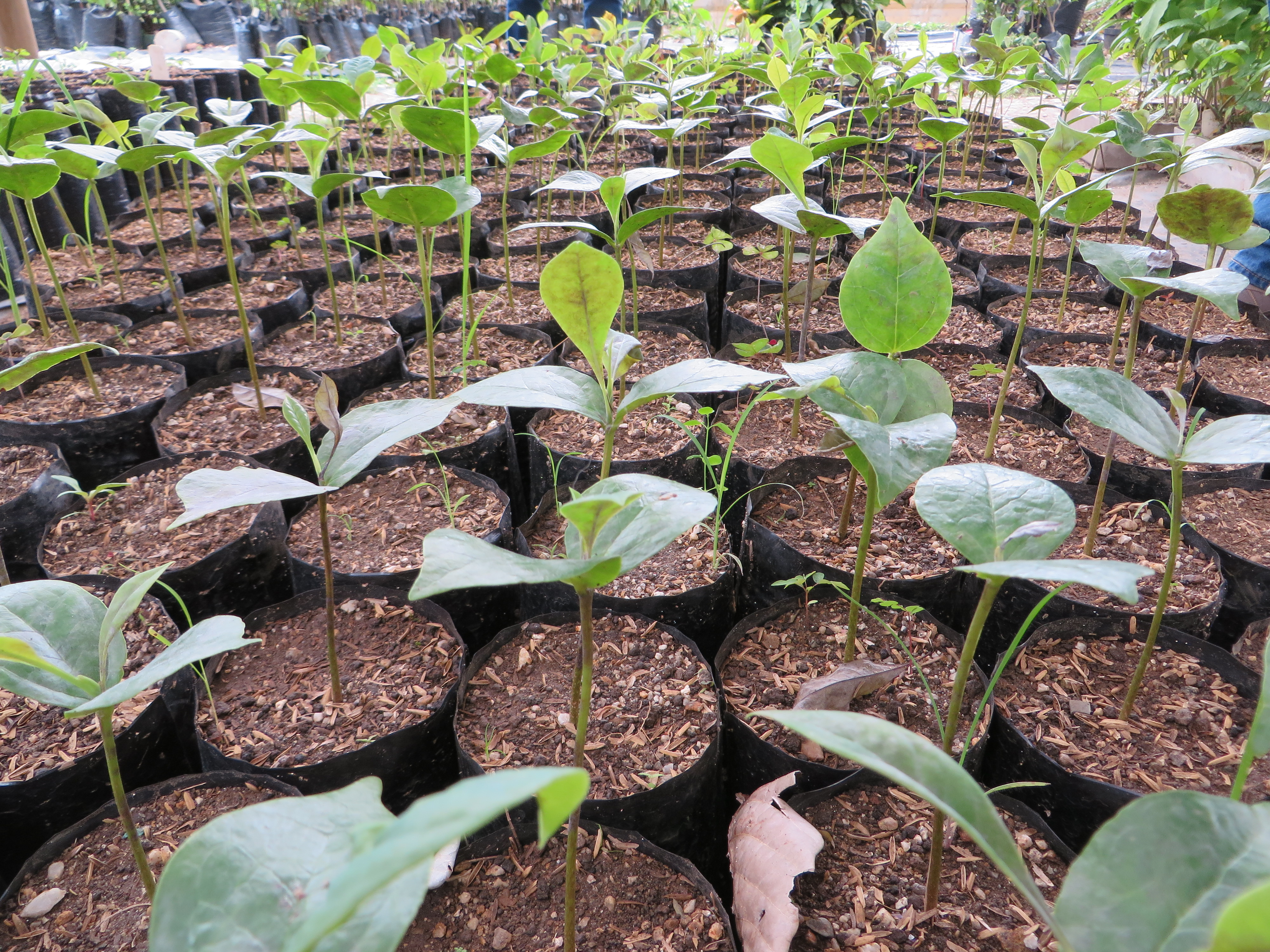
Seedlings M. silvioi

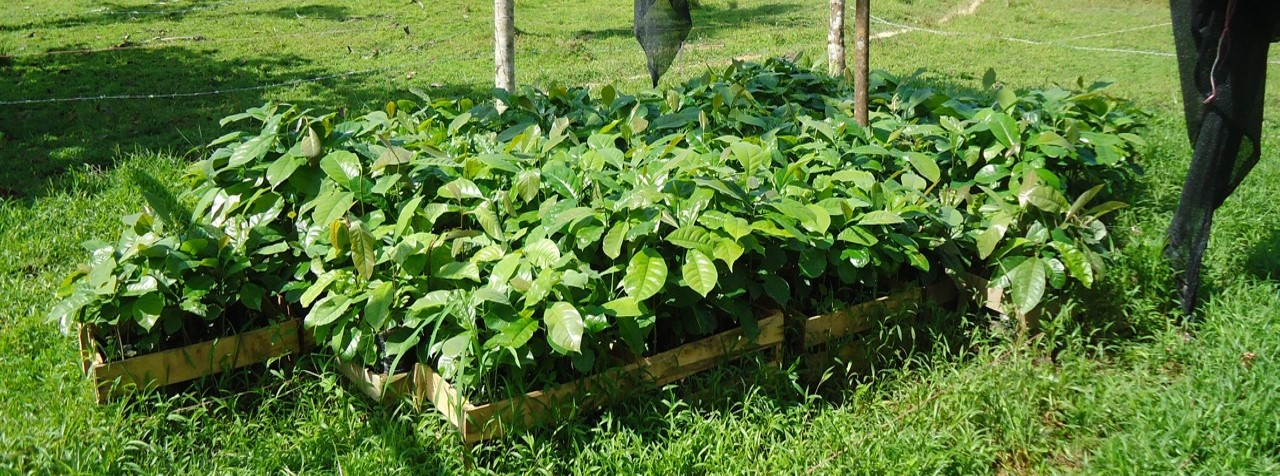
Seedlings M. silvioi

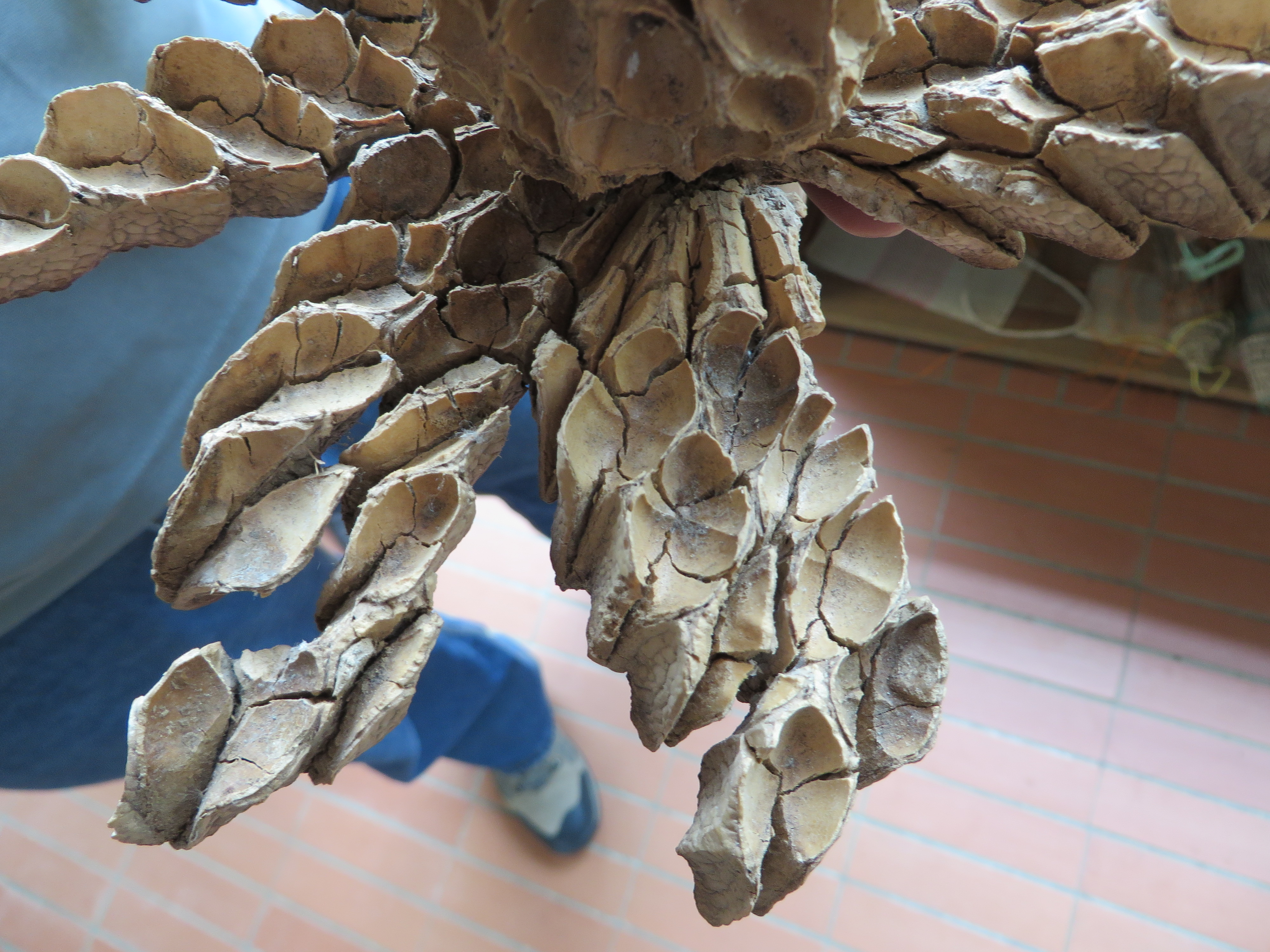
Dry open fruit

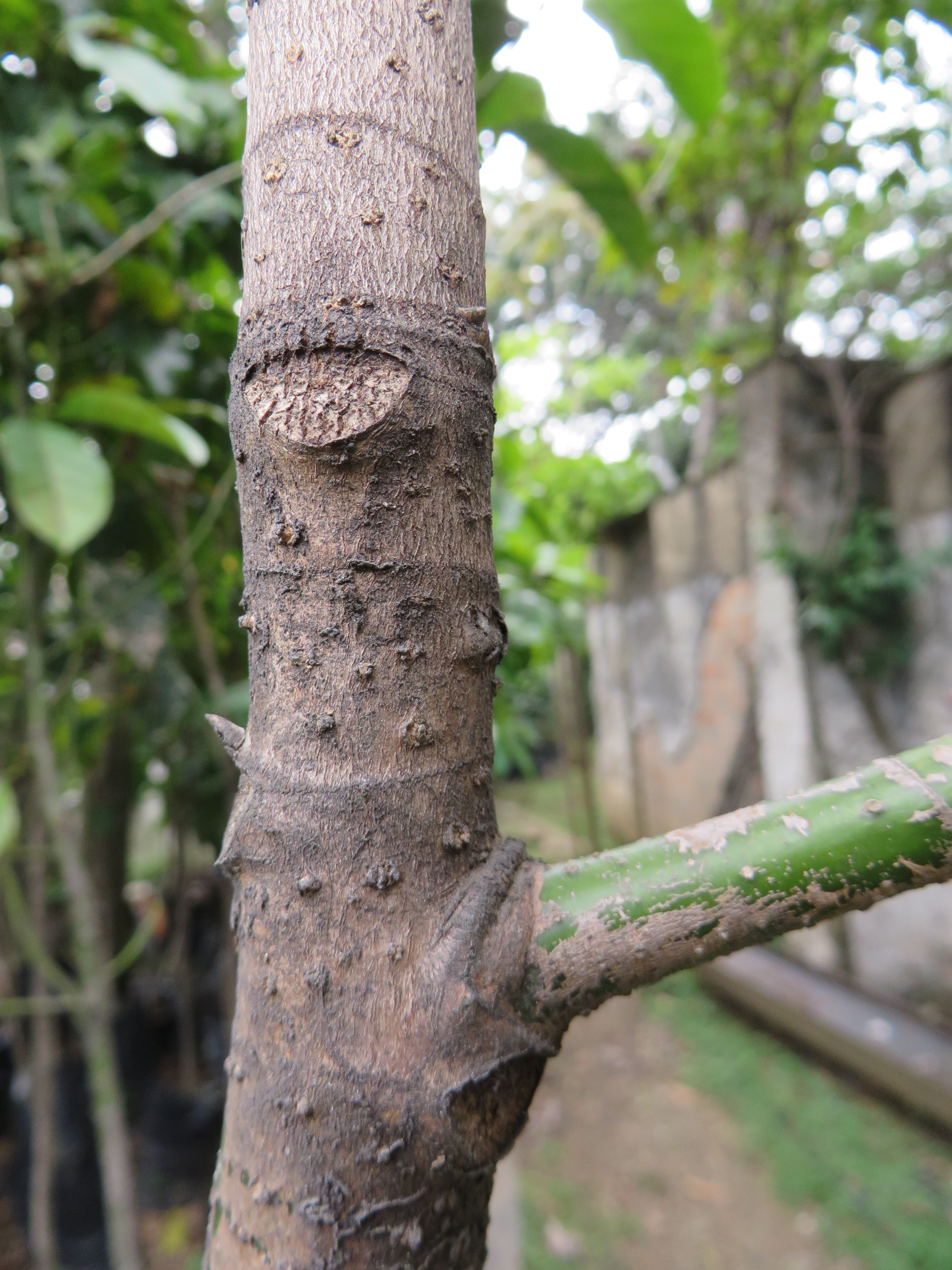
Trunk of M. silvioi

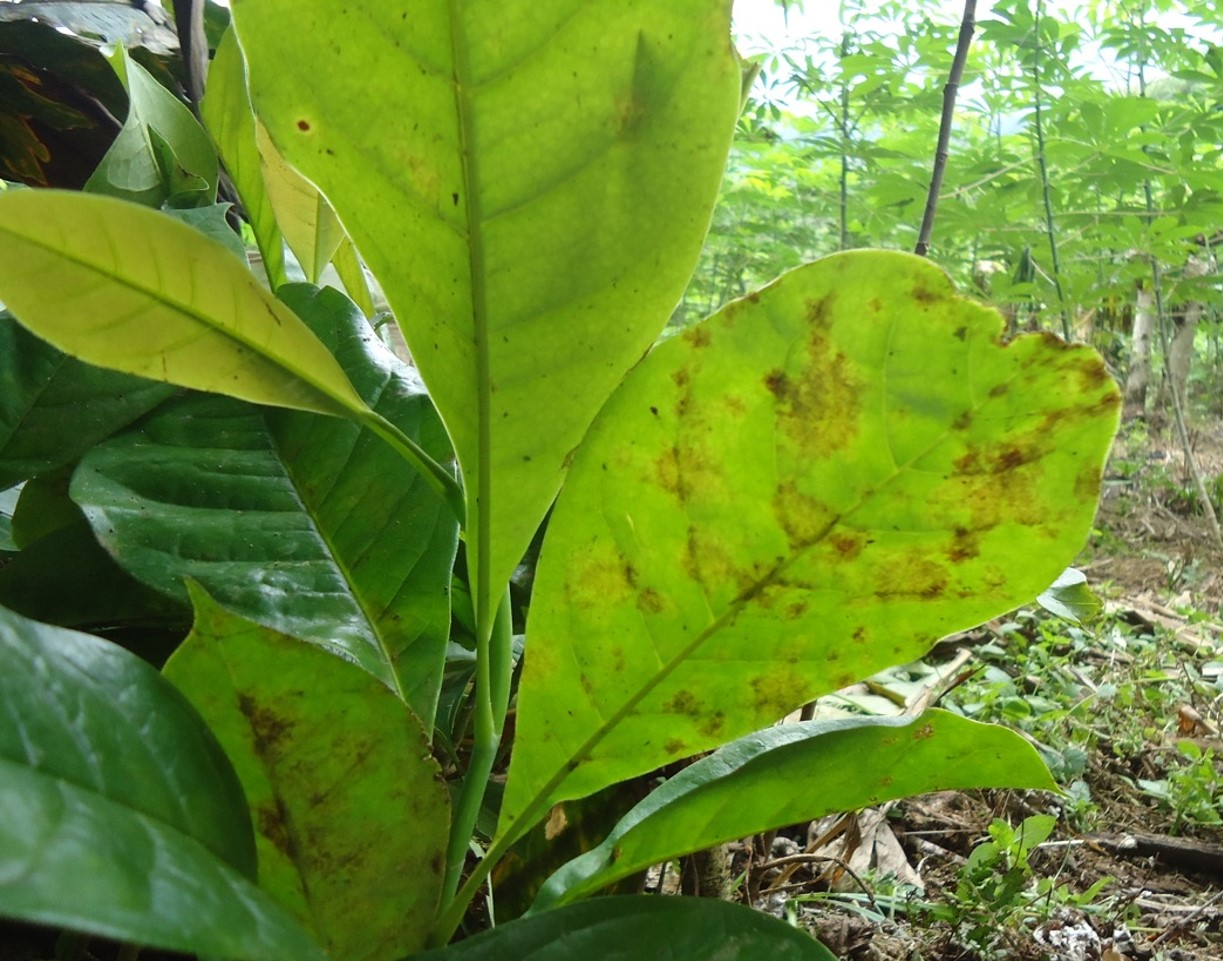
Leaves of M. silvioi

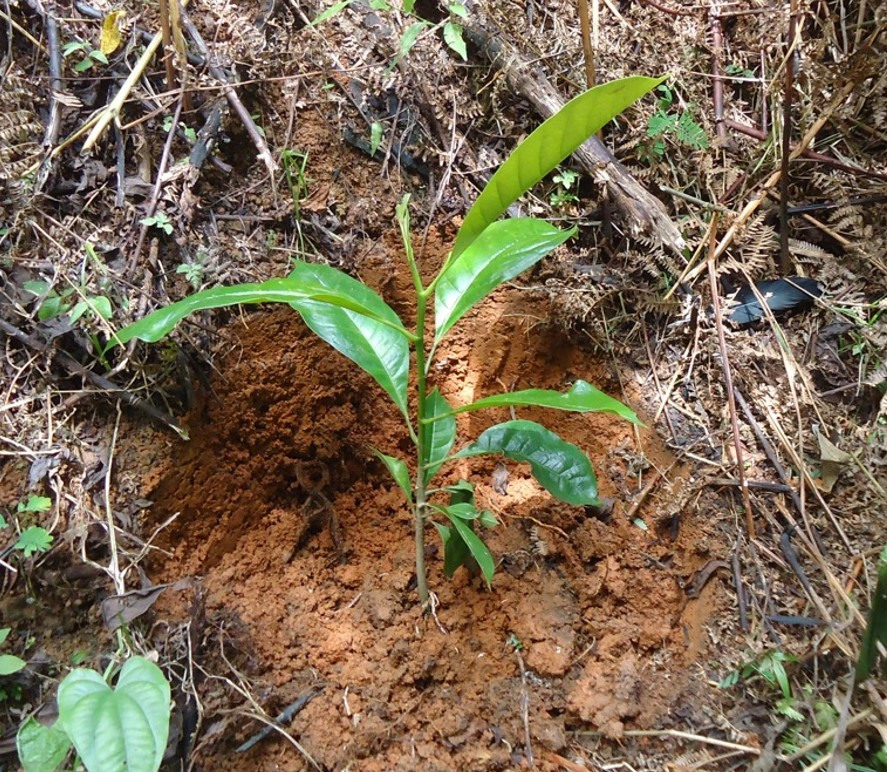
Seedling of M. silvioi

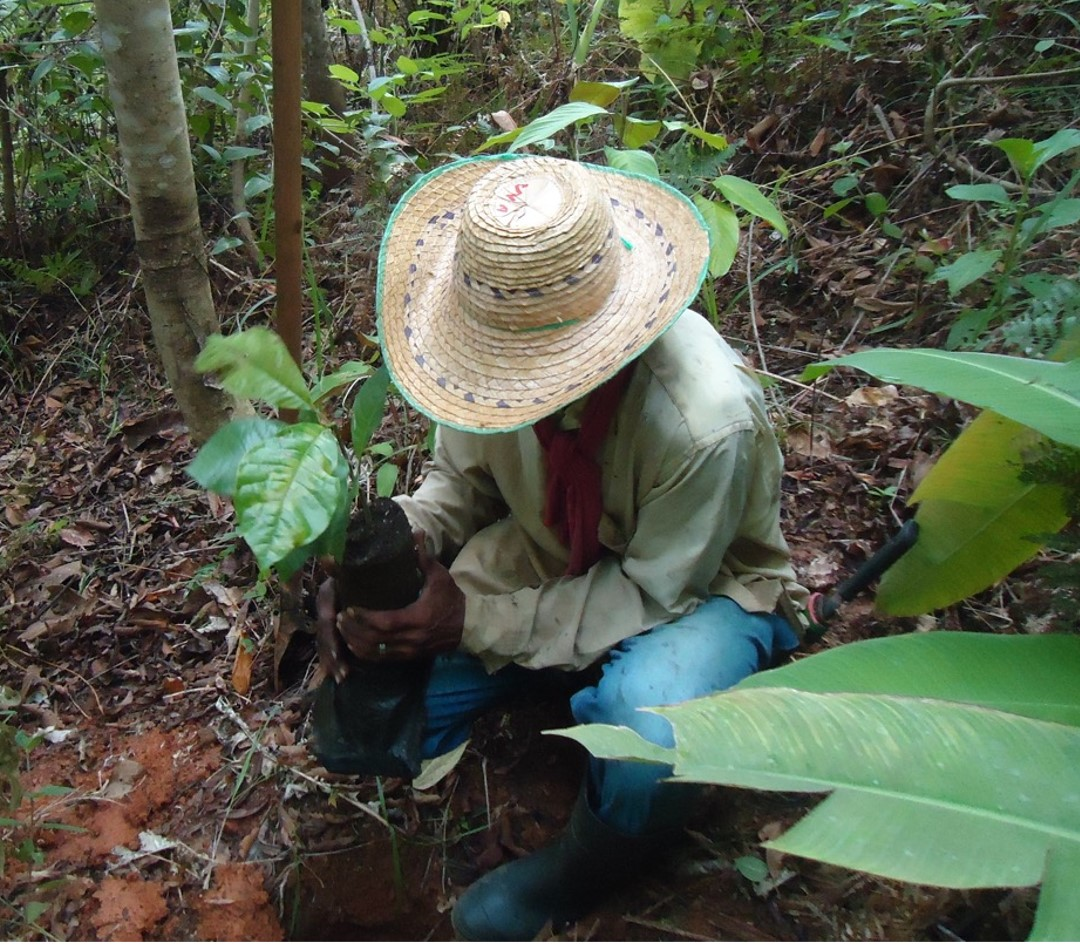
Planting M. silvioi

This is an endemic species of Antioquia Department. It is distributed in Central Andes in two regions in Northeast and East of the department in the medium valley of Magdalena River. Its elevational range is from 400 to 1,550 metres.

== Uses ==
In the past the wood was used in building structures for mining. Today is possibly used as saw timber. It has great potential as ornamental and has been used with this purpose in Valle del Aburrá and has been shown good development.

== Conservation status ==
It is listed in category “Endangered” (EN) in the Red Book of Plants of Colombia due to its small range distribution and also in forests subject to overexplotacion of saw timber and roundwood.
