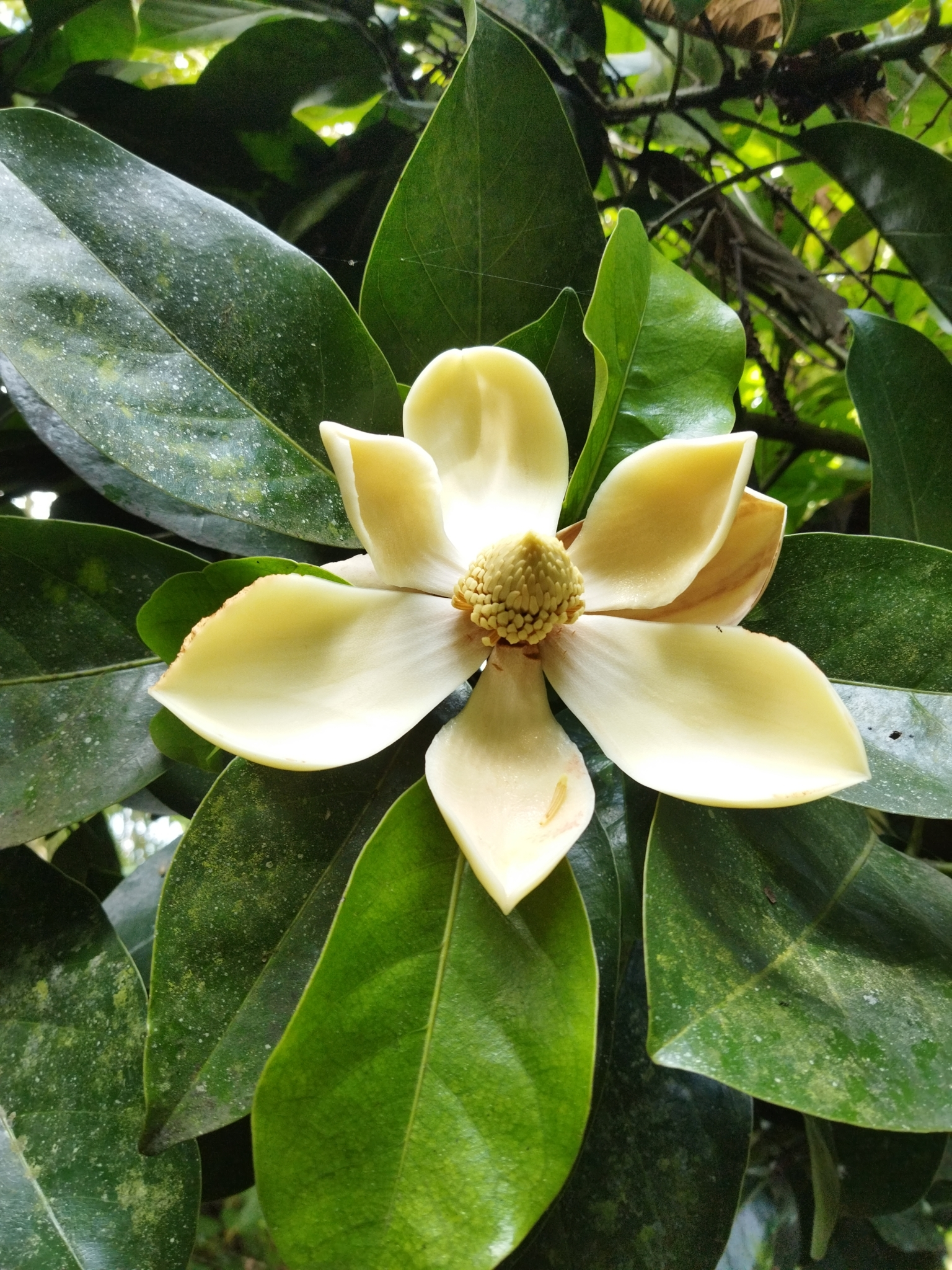

Conservation status
- Endangered (IUCN 3.1)

Scientific classification
- Kingdom: Plantae
- Clade: Embryophytes
- Clade: Tracheophytes
- Clade: Spermatophytes
- Clade: Angiosperms
- Clade: Magnoliids
- Order: Magnoliales
- Family: Magnoliaceae
- Genus: Magnolia
- Section: Magnolia sect. Talauma
- Species: M. gilbertoi

Binomial name
- Magnolia gilbertoi (Lozano) Govaerts

= Magnolia gilbertoi =

Species of flowering plant

Magnolia gilbertoi is a species of flowering plant in the family Magnoliaceae. It is a tree endemic to Colombia. It is known commonly as cana bravo and hojarasco de Gilberto.

This tree is part of the canopy in sub-Andean and Andean forests. It is cut for its wood and its habitat is being cleared for agriculture, making it an endangered species.
