= Magnolia neillii =

Conservation status
- Endangered (IUCN 3.1)

Scientific classification
- Kingdom: Plantae
- Clade: Embryophytes
- Clade: Tracheophytes
- Clade: Spermatophytes
- Clade: Angiosperms
- Clade: Magnoliids
- Order: Magnoliales
- Family: Magnoliaceae
- Genus: Magnolia
- Section: Magnolia sect. Talauma
- Species: M. neillii

Binomial name
- Magnolia neillii (Lozano) Govaerts

Synonyms
- Talauma neillii Lozano

Species of flowering plant

Magnolia neillii is a species of plant in the family Magnoliaceae. It is a tree native to southeastern Colombia and eastern Ecuador. Its natural habitat is subtropical or tropical moist lowland forests. If the Magnolia family is treated as consisting of a large number of smaller genera, then this species is placed in genus Talauma. In modern literature, it is customary to treat Magnolia as one large genus, and in that case, this species is treated as belonging to section Talauma in subgenus Magnolia.
