= Magnolia narinensis =

Conservation status
- Critically Endangered (IUCN 3.1)

Scientific classification
- Kingdom: Plantae
- Clade: Embryophytes
- Clade: Tracheophytes
- Clade: Spermatophytes
- Clade: Angiosperms
- Clade: Magnoliids
- Order: Magnoliales
- Family: Magnoliaceae
- Genus: Magnolia
- Section: Magnolia sect. Talauma
- Species: M. narinensis

Binomial name
- Magnolia narinensis (Lozano) Govaerts

Species of flowering plant

Magnolia narinensis is a species of flowering plant in the family Magnoliaceae. It is a tree endemic to Colombia.
