= Magnolia rimachii =

Conservation status
- Least Concern (IUCN 3.1)

Scientific classification
- Kingdom: Plantae
- Clade: Embryophytes
- Clade: Tracheophytes
- Clade: Spermatophytes
- Clade: Angiosperms
- Clade: Magnoliids
- Order: Magnoliales
- Family: Magnoliaceae
- Genus: Magnolia
- Section: Magnolia sect. Talauma
- Species: M. rimachii

Binomial name
- Magnolia rimachii (Lozano) Govaerts

Synonyms
- Talauma rimachii Lozano

Species of tree

Magnolia rimachii is a small to medium-sized tree of the family Magnoliaceae commonly reaching 8 to 15 m high. It is found in the western lowland Amazon Basin tropical forest, in Ecuador and Peru, between 140–500 metres (460–1,640 ft) in elevation.

== Description ==
Magnolia rimachii has chartaceous elliptic leaves 12–26 cm (4.7–10.2 in) long and 5–10 cm (2.0–3.9 in) broad. Flowers are fragrant and can have 6 or 7 obovate petals 2–4.5 cm (0.79–1.77 in) long and 1–2 cm (0.39–0.79 in) wide. The elliptic fruit can be ca. 3.5 cm (1.4 in) long.
