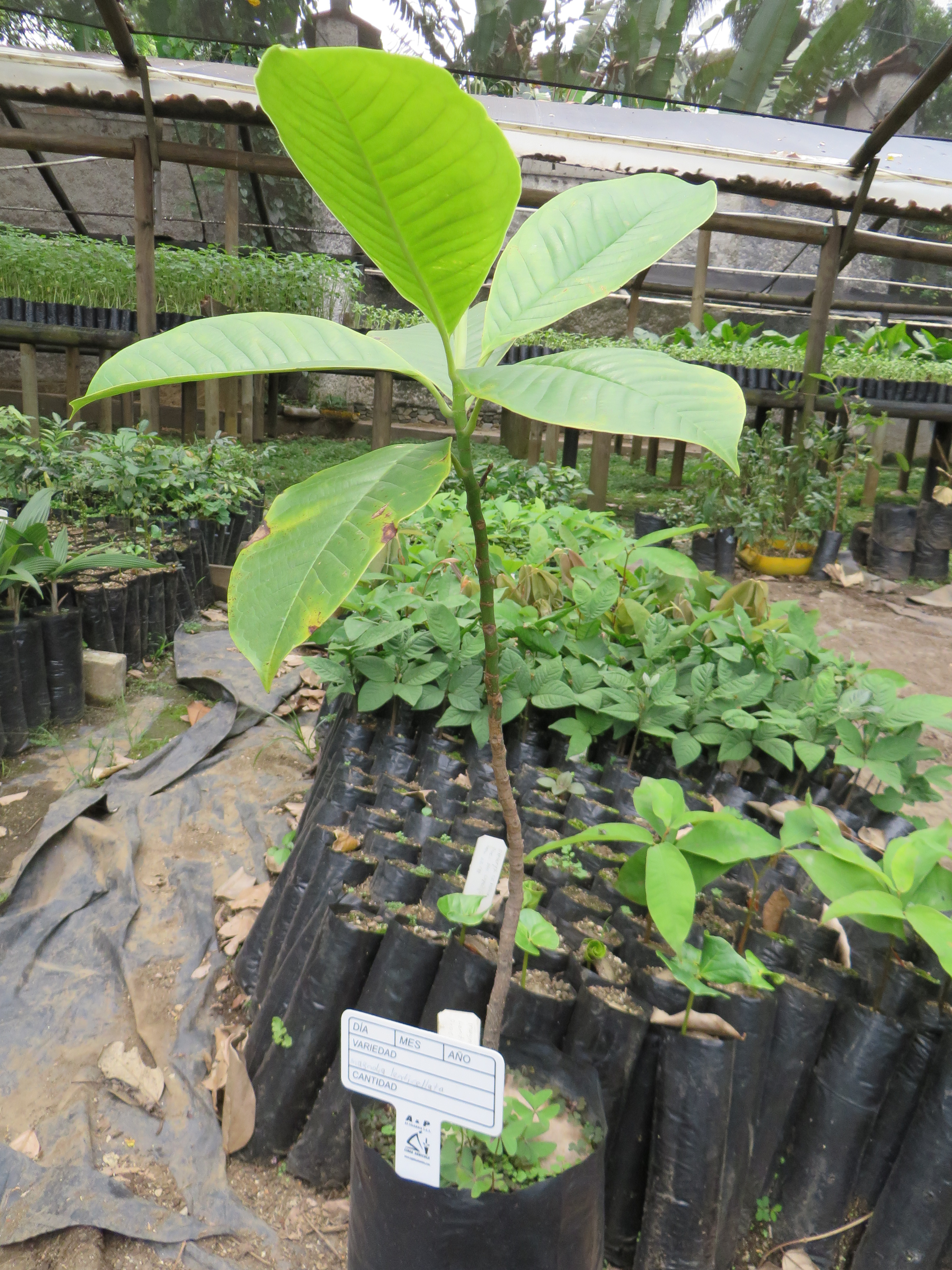
- Seedling of M. lenticelata

Conservation status
- Endangered (IUCN 3.1)

Scientific classification
- Kingdom: Plantae
- Clade: Embryophytes
- Clade: Tracheophytes
- Clade: Spermatophytes
- Clade: Angiosperms
- Clade: Magnoliids
- Order: Magnoliales
- Family: Magnoliaceae
- Genus: Magnolia
- Species: M. lenticellata

Binomial name
- Magnolia lenticellata (Lozano) Govaerts

Synonyms
- Dugandiodendron lenticellata Lozano

= Magnolia lenticellata =

Species of flowering plant

Magnolia lenticellata is a species of flowering plant in the family Magnoliaceae. It is a tree endemic to Antioquia Department of Colombia.
