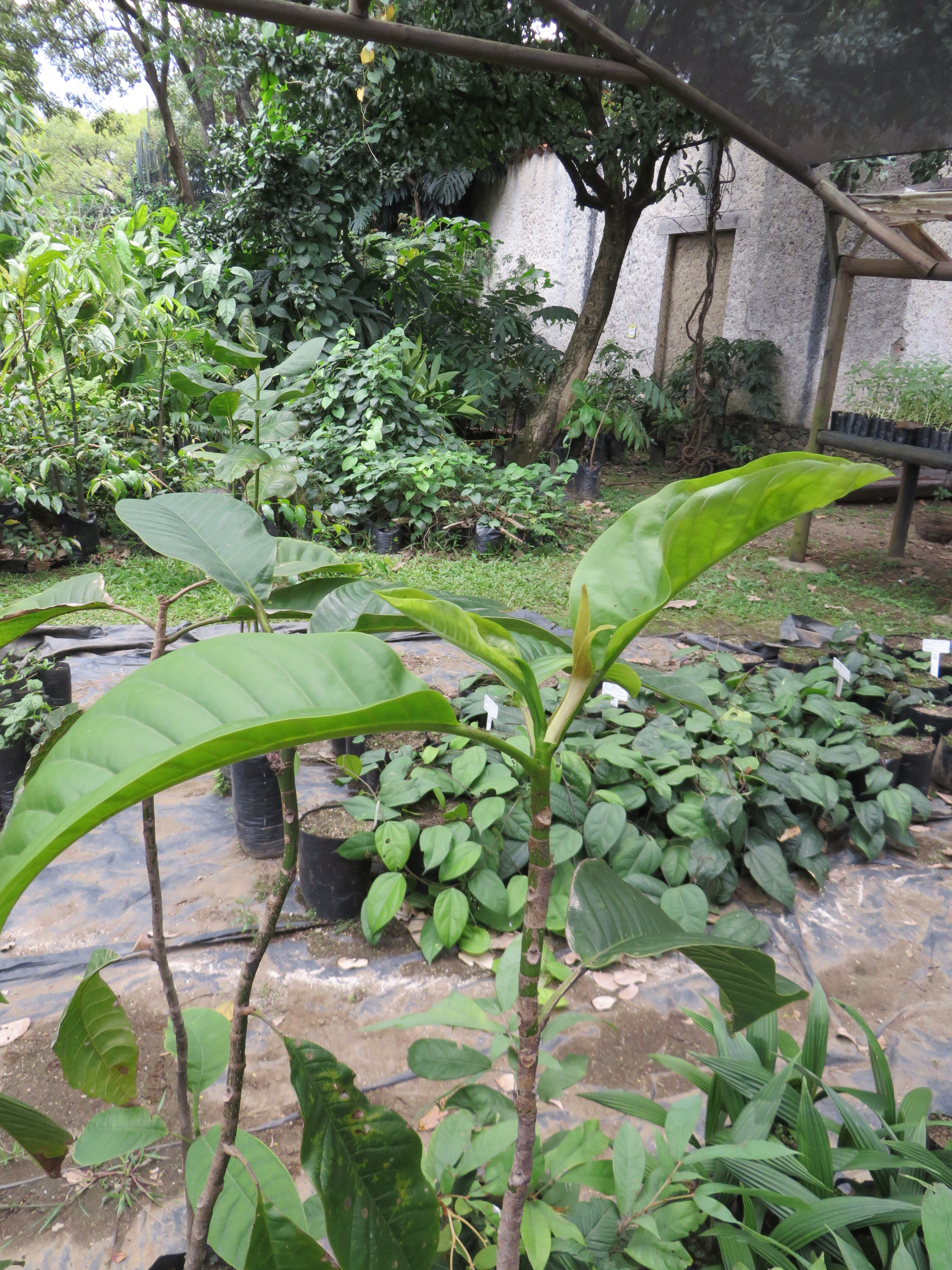

Conservation status
- Critically Endangered (IUCN 3.1)

Scientific classification
- Kingdom: Plantae
- Clade: Embryophytes
- Clade: Tracheophytes
- Clade: Spermatophytes
- Clade: Angiosperms
- Clade: Magnoliids
- Order: Magnoliales
- Family: Magnoliaceae
- Genus: Magnolia
- Section: Magnolia sect. Talauma
- Species: M. polyhypsophylla

Binomial name
- Magnolia polyhypsophylla (Lozano) Govaerts

Synonyms
- Talauma polyhypsophylla Lozano

= Magnolia polyhypsophylla =

Species of flowering plant

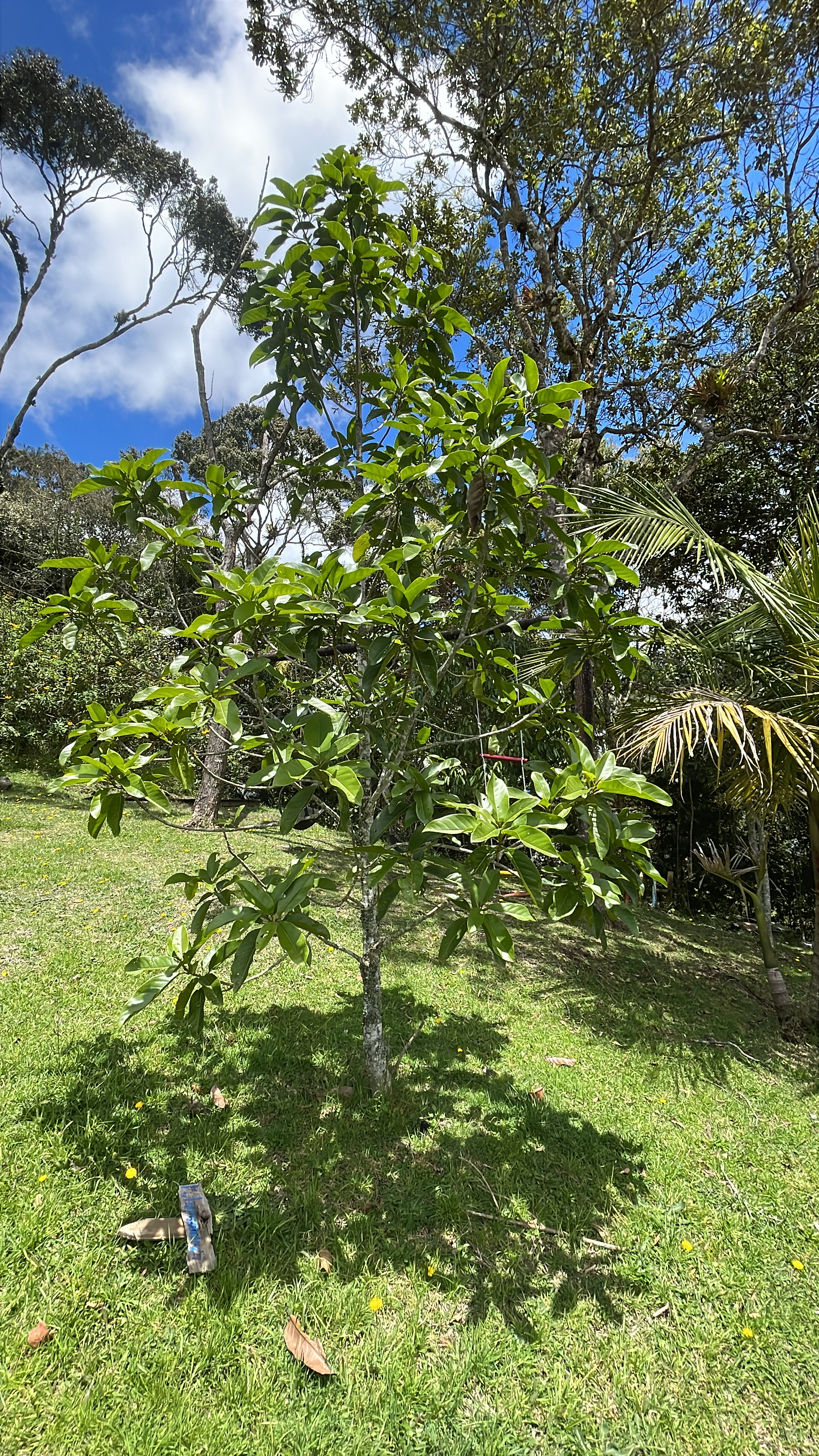

Magnolia polyhypsophylla is a species of flowering plant in the family Magnoliaceae. It is a tree endemic to Colombia. It is known commonly as almanegra de ventanas.

== Description ==
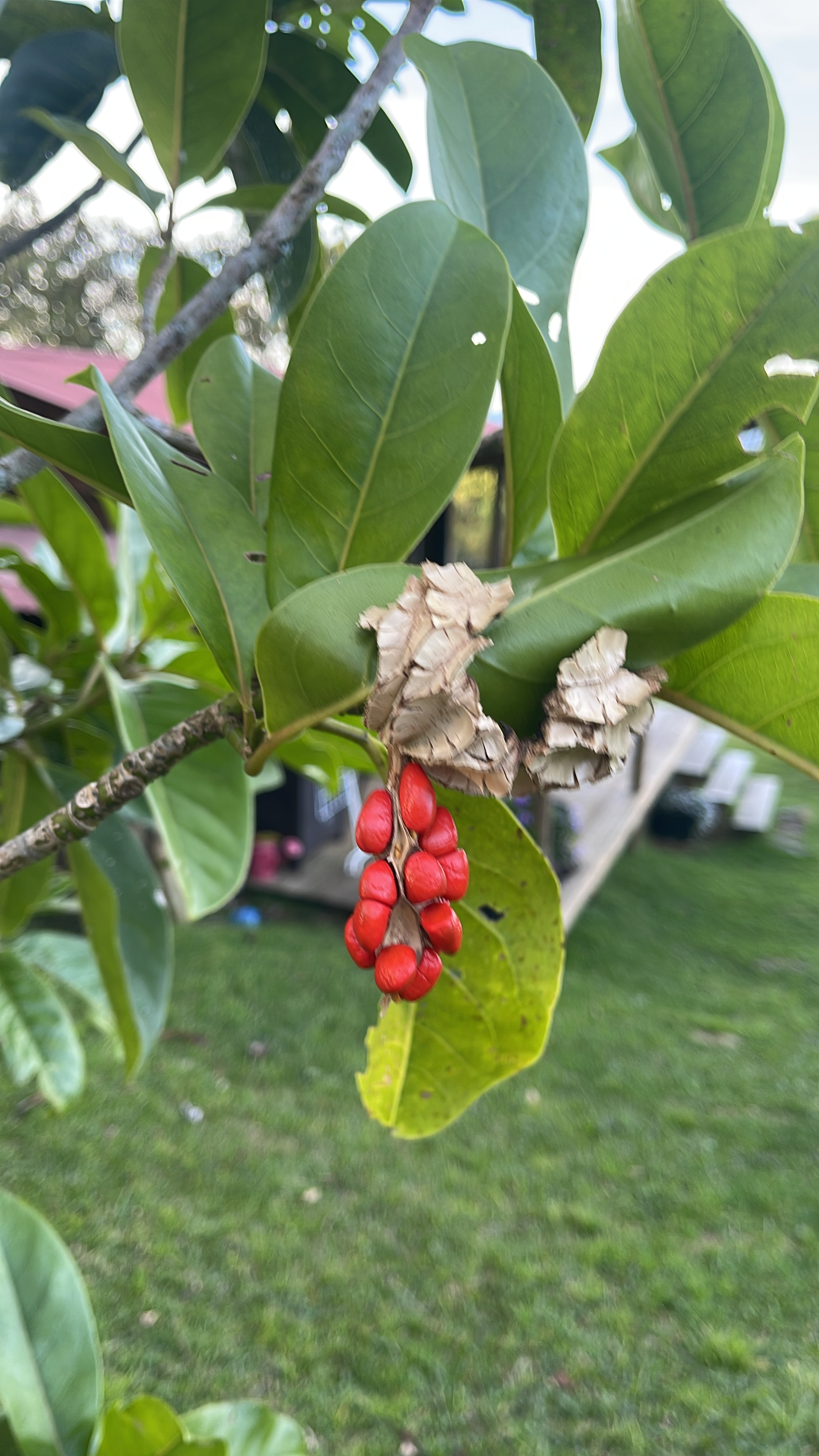

This species is a tree up to 25 meters tall and 80 cm in diameter. The bark is grey with darker grain. The leaves are alternately arranged with a light green petiole tinged with burgundy. The leaf blade is elliptical and leathery in texture, light bright green colored on the top, pale green on the underside, with a prominent median nerve on the bottom. The flowers are generally solitary at the end of the branches. They have three cream colored sepals, truncate at the base and apiculate at apex and six yellow-green petals. The fruits are elliptic in shape, measuring about 7 centimeters long by 3 wide. They open irregularly by detachment of the carpels. Each carpel has one or two aromatic red seeds.

== Distribution and habitat ==
This is an endemic tree of Antioquia department, where it grows in humid forests in the pre-montane and low montane in a region known as Alto de Ventanas between the municipalities of Briceño, Valdívia and Yarumal. It is a canopy tree and can be found on grazing lands and on the edge of small forest fragments using for protection of water courses. It grows at elevations of 1800 to 2600 m.a.s.l.

== Uses ==
This tree is harvested for timber and is used for furniture and wood beams. It is also grown as an ornamental plant.

== Conservation ==
This species is listed as Critically Endangered (CR) in the Red Book of Plants of Colombia due to its presence is limited to only one locality smaller than 100 square kilometers. The local habitat is fragmented and degraded, in part by pasture and dairy farming use.

== Fruit production and seed collection ==
Magnolia polyhypsophylla produces flower buds year round, but few flowers open or lead to fruit production. Fruit collection should be done during the months of August, September and November, when fruits are most abundant. The fruits take at least 5 months to mature.

Fruits are collected before or after they fall from the tree. Immature fruits may be left to ripen so that the seeds may be collected after dehiscence. The fruits are soaked and cleaned to retrieve the seeds. The seeds are sensitive to desiccation. They require no pre-germination treatment and can be sowed in a sand/soil mix.
