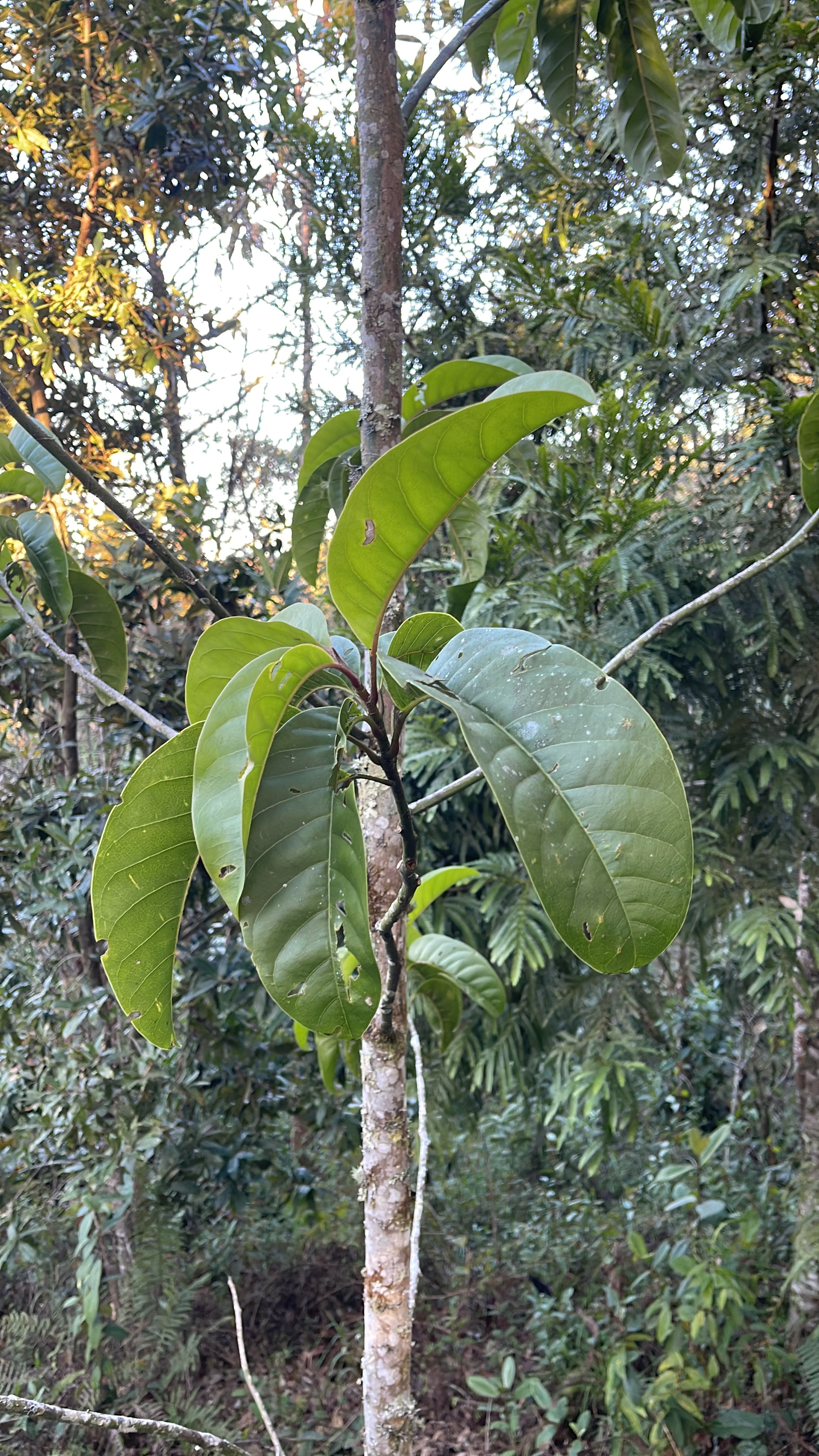

Conservation status
- Critically Endangered (IUCN 3.1)

Scientific classification
- Kingdom: Plantae
- Clade: Tracheophytes
- Clade: Angiosperms
- Clade: Magnoliids
- Order: Magnoliales
- Family: Magnoliaceae
- Genus: Magnolia
- Subgenus: Magnolia subg. Magnolia
- Section: Magnolia sect. Talauma
- Subsection: Magnolia subsect. Talauma
- Species: M. espinalii

Binomial name
- Magnolia espinalii (Lozano) Govaerts

= Magnolia espinalii =

Species of flowering plant

Magnolia espinalii is a species of plant in the family Magnoliaceae. It is endemic to Colombia but critically endangered. According to López-A et al., as of 2008 there were only 23 known surviving trees in the wild. Common names include: hojarasco, magnolio de monte.

== Description ==
The trees are reaching up to 30 m height and 55 cm in diameter; the bark and wood are cinnamon colored. It has knotted twigs marked by annual scars, with short internodes covered with pubescence and oval lenticels. Leaves alternate, simple and spirally arranged. The petiole presents a scar the surface caused by the fall of the leaf bud. The pubescence is located on the main vein on the bottom of the leave. The leaf shape can vary from oval to elliptic and present coriaceous leaves; leaf base and apex are rounded. Solitary flowers located at the end of the branches, colored from yellowish green to beige, with 3 to 5 deciduous floral bracts; 3 obovate thick fresh sepals; 6 to 7 obovate and fleshy petals with truncate base and acute apex. Woody fruit, elliptic, measuring from 6,9 to 8,5 cm long and 3,3 to 4,5 cm broad; the carpels split open irregularly. Each fruit contains from 6 to 20 well developed ripe seeds which might not be completely formed .

== Habitat and local distribution ==
It is endemic of Antioquia State, Colombia, distributed along the Central Andes and East Andes, between 1.800 and 2.400 m. It occurs in humid pre-montane forests and humid montane forests in the following towns: Angelópolis, Armenia Mantequilla, Betania, Caldas, Envigado, Jericó and Medellín.

== Uses ==
The wood was used for utility poles, wooden sticks, wood boards, pillars, scantling wood and furniture. It has great potential for ornamental uses.

== Conservation ==
It is listed in the category "Critically Endangered" (CR) in the Red Book of Plants of Colombia and also by the IUCN Red List of Threatened Species. This is due to an estimated reduction in population size of 50% which is caused by the degradation of habitats where populations occur.

== Reproductive phenology ==
Magnolia espinalii presents good amount of flower buds almost along the whole year, with a slightly decrease during the end of the second rain period and during the beginning of the dry season (November, December and January). As other magnolias species monitored, presents high percentage of flower bud fall, which are aborted without completing their development. Although fruit production is low, two fruit production periods can be noted, one from March to April and one from October to November. It takes from 5 to 6 months to the fruit to complete their development and ripe.

== Seed management, sexual propagation and nursery production ==
=== Fruit and seed description ===
The fruit is woody, elliptic, measuring from 6.9 to 8.5 cm long and from 3.3 to 4.5 cm broad. Only 50 to 80% of the seeds develop completely. The seeds are smooth, colored from dark brown to black, irregular shape resembling a heart. The seeds size goes from 10 to 14 mm broad and from 9 to 12 mm long. The seed are covered by an aromatic reddish fleshy layer called sarcotesta. 1,000 seeds weigh from 195 to 215 grams, and 1 kilogram can have 4,650 to 5,130 seeds. The dispersal of seeds is done by birds and small mammals.

=== Collecting and processing the fruits ===
Two harvest periods during the high rainfall months have been identified. One starts in March and ends in April and the second goes from October to November. The best option is to harvest the fruits directly from the trees before they open and release the seeds. However, when this is not possible, fruits can be collected from the ground. If fruits are collected from the ground, fruits and seeds that present signs of rot or insect attack should be discarded. In order to optimize fruit harvest directly from the tree, a system was designed to identify green fruits and protects its fruits using a small basket which can be built with wire and plastic mesh (with mesh size of 1 mm or less). These baskets protect the fruits from predation and decreases the chances of losing the fruits. Once the fruit starts dehiscence, they are collected manually (climbing the tree) or using an extension pruning pole. If the fruits are collected when they are still closed, they should be stored in shade until they dehiscence, then the seeds should be extracted and select only those with bright red sarcotesta (indicates the seeds are ripe). In order to clean the seeds and remove the bright red aril, the seeds should be put into water overnight, macerated and rinsed using running water. It is recommended to make an immersion in sodium hypochlorite 1% for 15 minutes to prevent infestation by fungi.

=== Seed storage ===
According to preliminary studies, the seeds quickly lose viability and therefore should be sown as fresh as possible. When this is not possible, it is recommended to keep them for a short period of time with the red sarcotesta within a wet substrate (sawdust and sand, for example), airtight container and at low temperature (about 4 °C).

=== Sowing and germination ===
The fresh seeds do not need a pre-germination treatment; nevertheless, it is advisable to pay attention to the luminous conditions because this is a factor that affects the final results. For example, fresh seeds sowed in a substratum of soil and sand (proportion 2:1), under two very different luminous conditions (full sun exposition and darkness) showed a germination capacity of 60% and 80%, respectively. The germination of the sowed seeds under full exposition started after 46 days and was completed a month later, while the seeds sowed under a complete darkness started 69 days and was completed 19 days after. The germination is epigeous, starts from 45 to 60 days after sowing and is completed 30 days after. Two weeks after the germination, seedlings had already unfolded the cotyledon leaves and it showed 3, 5 cm average height.

=== Handling of seedlings in nursery ===
For a better dissemination, we can use a mix of soil and sand (2:1 proportion). Once seedlings reached 4 cm of height they can be moved into a bag. After this process, it is advisable to leave the plants under shade and reduce it gradually. When seedlings reach 25 to 30 cm of height, they are ready to be planted definitively in the field (with a shade-providing roof in case of sunny stands).
