= Magnolia cararensis =

Conservation status
- Critically Endangered (IUCN 3.1)

Scientific classification
- Kingdom: Plantae
- Clade: Embryophytes
- Clade: Tracheophytes
- Clade: Spermatophytes
- Clade: Angiosperms
- Clade: Magnoliids
- Order: Magnoliales
- Family: Magnoliaceae
- Genus: Magnolia
- Section: Magnolia sect. Talauma
- Subsection: Magnolia subsect. Dugandiodendron
- Species: M. cararensis

Binomial name
- Magnolia cararensis (Lozano) Govaerts

Synonyms
- Dugandiodendron cararense Lozano

Species of flowering plant

Magnolia cararensis is a species of flowering plant in the family Magnoliaceae. It is endemic to Colombia, where it is known from a single location. This area is vulnerable to clearing for agriculture and the trees are cut for wood.
