= Magnolia henaoi =

Conservation status
- Endangered (IUCN 3.1)

Scientific classification
- Kingdom: Plantae
- Clade: Embryophytes
- Clade: Tracheophytes
- Clade: Spermatophytes
- Clade: Angiosperms
- Clade: Magnoliids
- Order: Magnoliales
- Family: Magnoliaceae
- Genus: Magnolia
- Section: Magnolia sect. Talauma
- Species: M. henaoi

Binomial name
- Magnolia henaoi (Lozano) Govaerts

Species of flowering plant

Magnolia henaoi is a species of flowering plant in the family Magnoliaceae. It is endemic to Colombia, where it is known from only two locations. It is known commonly as hojarasco de Henao. It is an uncommon part of the canopy of sub-Andean forest habitat. It is threatened by overcollection for its wood.
