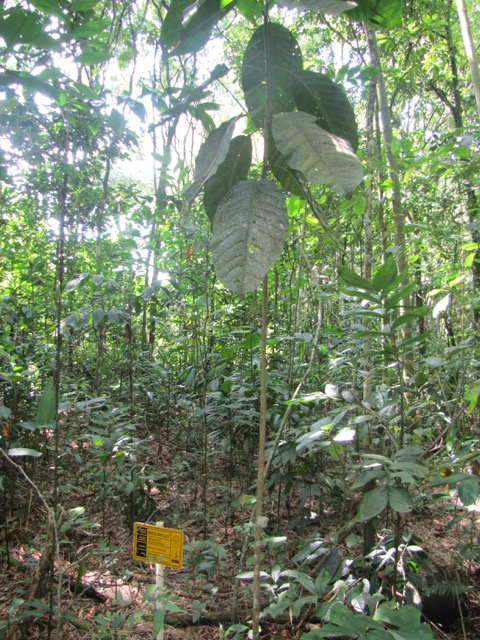

Conservation status
- Endangered (IUCN 3.1)

Scientific classification
- Kingdom: Plantae
- Clade: Embryophytes
- Clade: Tracheophytes
- Clade: Spermatophytes
- Clade: Angiosperms
- Clade: Magnoliids
- Order: Magnoliales
- Family: Magnoliaceae
- Genus: Magnolia
- Section: Magnolia sect. Talauma
- Species: M. hernandezii

Binomial name
- Magnolia hernandezii (Lozano) Govaerts

Synonyms
- Talauma hernandezii Lozano

= Magnolia hernandezii =

Species of tree

Magnolia hernandezii is a species of flowering plant in the family Magnoliaceae. It is a tree endemic to western Colombia. The tree can attain a height of up to 40 m and trunk diameter approaching 1 m with smooth, light-brown or light-grey bark. It has a woody, globular fruit with up to 15 cm diameter.

The Species is being investigated by a conservation and propagation research program implemented by Technical University of Pereira with support by Botanical Gardens Conservation International .

Locally called molinillo, the tree is endemic to the Cauca river watershed and surroundings, from Antioquia Department to the South of Valle department. It is distributed between 1700 and 2600 metres elevation. Currently the species only occurs in a few locations with remains of old-growth primary forest, on the slopes of the Occidental and Central Andean Cordillera, in Valle, Quindío, Antioquia and Risaralda departments. In Risaralda department, it is very scarce, there is confirmed presence of the species in the Municipalities of Santuario, La Celia, Pereira and potentially in rural areas of the municipalities of Pueblo Rico, Belén de Umbría, Apía and Balboa.

Its distribution is critically endangered principally because of expansion of coffee growth, and livestock grazing areas, construction of housing and roads, and especially due to its overexploitation for use as sawnwood.

== Description ==
They are trees reaching from 18 to 30 m height and 50–70 cm in diameter, wide dark green canopy. The bark is almost smooth, pale brown. Fine texture wood. Leaves alternate, simple, ovate leathery, glabrous, apex rounded, entire margin, cuneate base, prominent veins on the bottom of the leaves. The petiole has a scar covering its entire surface. The flowers are solitary, glabrous; white to cream color, locates at the end of the branches, peduncle are thicker towards the apex. Flower bud enclosed within an involucre by four bracts usually covered with pubescence; 3 elliptical sepals, white, fleshy; has from 8 to 10 petals cream colored, thick and oblong. Woody fruit, sub-globose, glabrous, green colored, measuring between 9,7 and 20 cm long and 8–25 cm broad; when the fruits dehiscence, seeds remain attached in its central axis. Each fruit can have 105-219 seeds, and in some cases more than 50% of it can be completely formed. One carpel has from 1 to 2 seeds.

== Habitat and distribution ==
This species only occurs in Colombia, it is distributed along the geographical valley of Cauca River from 1'700 to 2'600 m in the humid montane forests and humid pre-montane forests. It is a tree located in the canopy top that grows in disturbed primary forest fragments and stubble, or as solitary tree in grazing areas or coffee plantations, mainly on peaks or mountain slopes. It is reported in the municipalities of Andes, Betulia, Buriticá, Caramanta, Ciudad Bolívar, Ebéjico, Jardín, Pueblo Rico and Támesis.

== Uses ==
The central axis of the fruit has been used for many years in the manufacture of pinwheel . The wood has been used on carpentry and woodworking. The species also has potential do be used as ornamental because of its great shape, shiny foliage and flower size.

== Conservation ==
It is listed in category "Endangered" (EN) in the Red Book of Plants of Colombia and also by the IUCN Red List of Threatened Species. This is due to diminishing of its population size estimated above 50%, which, in turn, is caused by the loss of their natural habitats.

== Reproductive phenology ==
According to observations, the trees of M. hernandezii present almost constant amount of flowers and flower buds along the year. During the months of June and July the production of flowers and flower bud decrease because of the lack of rainfall comparing to other months. Although there is no specific time for harvesting the fruits as these are present constantly and at different stages of development, a greater proportion of mature fruits were recorded during the months of September, October, December, January and June. As observed the formation and development of the fruits take between 7 and 8 months, which are longer than for other species. This might be due to the bigger size of its fruits.

== Seed management, sexual propagation and nursery production ==
=== Fruit and seed description ===
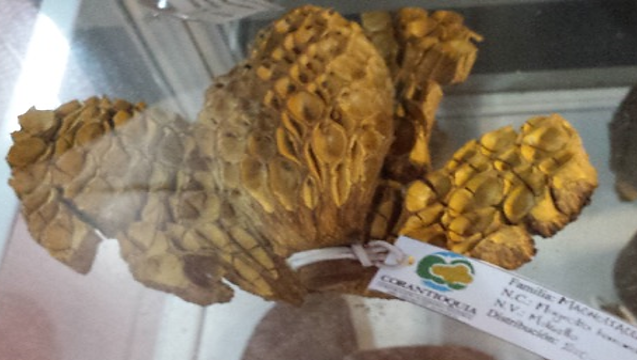
Open dry fruit of M. hernandezii

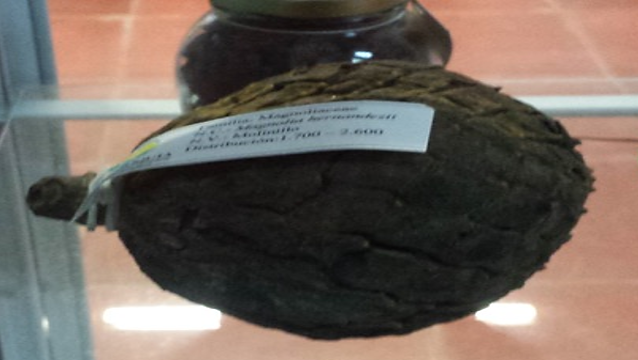
Fruit of M. hernandezii

It is a woody fruit, subglobose, glabrous, green colored, measuring from 9,7 to 20 cm long and from 8 to 25 cm broad; when the fruits dehiscence, seeds remain attached in its central axis. Each fruit has 1105 to 219 seeds and in some cases more than 50% of it is not fully formed. Each follicle contains 1 to 2 seeds. The seeds are smooth, dark brown, measuring from 13 to 20 mm broad, 6,2 to 10,8 mm long and 3,1 and 4,2 mm tick. The seeds are covered by an aromatic reddish fleshy layer named sarcotesta. The moister content of fresh seeds is around 35,3%. 1'000 seeds weight from 108 to 125 grams and 1 kilogram can have from 8'000 to 9'260 seeds.

=== Collecting and processing the fruits ===
Fruit harvest is made during September, October, December, January and June. Since the fruits are dehiscent, it is recommended to harvest the fruits directly from the trees before they open to release the seeds when they are still green, but opening lines can be seeing. The safest and more recommendable way to collect the fruits is directly from the tree using a climbing technique that doesn't damage the bark. In some cases when the trees are not too height and the branches are easy to reach, it is recommended to collect the fruit from the ground using an extension pruning pole. When collecting from the ground, special attention should be given to the presence of insect hole and fungus in the fruits to eliminate those fruits. Once the fruits have dehiscence, mature seeds are extracted and the ones with good phytosanitary conditions are selected. In order to remove the red sacotesta covering the seeds, they should be immersed in cold water for 24 hours, then macerated and rinsed with water.

=== Seed storage ===
In accordance with previous studies it is not advisable to keep the seeds, because they are very sensitive to the desiccation. Nevertheless, if it is not possible to proceed to the sowing immediately we can keep it in the fridge for few days with the red sarcotesta in a closed container with sawdust.

=== Sowing and germination ===
Before sowing, it is advisable to stir the sarcotesta of the seeds, clean it with running water and emerge it into a solution of 1% sodium hypochlorite during 15 minutes to avoid fungal infestations. For a better germination it is suggested to hydrate the seeds during 12 hours and sow it after in a mix of soil and sand (2:1 proportion). With this process the germination capacity is changing from 60 to 68%, while in no hydrated seeds the germination capacity oscillates between 40 and 48%. Germination starts between 56 and 61 days after sowing and is completed 30 or 40 days after. It is not important if they have exposed to the sunlight or under shade. Another option to improve the dissemination of the species is to mix the seeds (previously hydrated during 12 hours) with wet sawdust and to put it into black bags. With this process, the germination starts two months after sowing and is completed three months later. The average of germination is 74% that oscillates between 52 and 92%. The germination is epigeous.

=== Handling of seedlings in nursery ===
For a better dissemination it is recommendable to use a mix of soil and sand in 2:1 proportion. Once seedlings reached 4 cm of height we can move it to a bag. After this process, it is advisable to leave the plants under shade and reduce it gradually. When seedlings reach 25 cm of height and have been hardened at least a little, we can consider that they are ready to be planted definitively at the field.
