= Magnolia georgii =

Conservation status
- Endangered (IUCN 3.1)

Scientific classification
- Kingdom: Plantae
- Clade: Embryophytes
- Clade: Tracheophytes
- Clade: Spermatophytes
- Clade: Angiosperms
- Clade: Magnoliids
- Order: Magnoliales
- Family: Magnoliaceae
- Genus: Magnolia
- Section: Magnolia sect. Talauma
- Species: M. georgii

Binomial name
- Magnolia georgii (Lozano) Govaerts

Synonyms
- Talauma georgii Lozano

Species of flowering plant

Magnolia georgii is a species of flowering plant in the family Magnoliaceae. It is a tree endemic to Colombia, where it is known commonly as cucharo. It has thick spoon-shaped leaves, and flowers and fruits in July and October. It grows on the western slopes of the Cordillera Oriental, from northern Boyaca Department to southern Santander Department. It is a canopy tree of Andean moist montane forests from 2,300 to 2,400 metres elevation.

The species was first described as Talauma georgii by Gustavo Lozano Contreras in 1983. In 1996 Rafaël Govaerts placed the species in genus Magnolia as M. georgii.
