= Magnolia minor =

Conservation status
- Endangered (IUCN 3.1)

Scientific classification
- Kingdom: Plantae
- Clade: Embryophytes
- Clade: Tracheophytes
- Clade: Spermatophytes
- Clade: Angiosperms
- Clade: Magnoliids
- Order: Magnoliales
- Family: Magnoliaceae
- Genus: Magnolia
- Section: Magnolia sect. Talauma
- Species: M. minor

Binomial name
- Magnolia minor (Urb.) Govaerts

Synonyms
- Svenhedinia minor (Urb.) Urb.; Talauma minor Urb.

Species of flowering plant

Magnolia minor is a species of flowering plant in the family Magnoliaceae. It is a tree endemic to eastern Cuba. It is threatened by habitat loss.
