= Magnolia gloriensis =

Conservation status
- Data Deficient (IUCN 3.1)

Scientific classification
- Kingdom: Plantae
- Clade: Embryophytes
- Clade: Tracheophytes
- Clade: Spermatophytes
- Clade: Angiosperms
- Clade: Magnoliids
- Order: Magnoliales
- Family: Magnoliaceae
- Genus: Magnolia
- Section: Magnolia sect. Talauma
- Species: M. gloriensis

Binomial name
- Magnolia gloriensis (Pittier) Govaerts

Synonyms
- Talauma gloriensis Pittier

Species of flowering plant

Magnolia gloriensis is a species of plant in the family Magnoliaceae. It is native to the mountains of Costa Rica and western Panama.

== Description ==
Magnolia gloriensis is a large tree.

== Range and habitat ==
Magnolia gloriensis is native to the mountains of Costa Rica and western Panama. It may also range into the mountains of southern Nicaragua, but its presence and range there is not known.

Magnolia gloriensis lives in humid submontane and lower montane forests, from 600 to 1,800 meters elevation. In the Monteverde region of northwestern Costa Rica it is found at 600 meters elevation. In western Panama it has been recorded between 1,500 and 1,800 meters elevation.

== Conservation and threats ==
The species' population and conservation is not well understood. Portions of its range are in protected areas. Its conservation status is assessed as data deficient.
