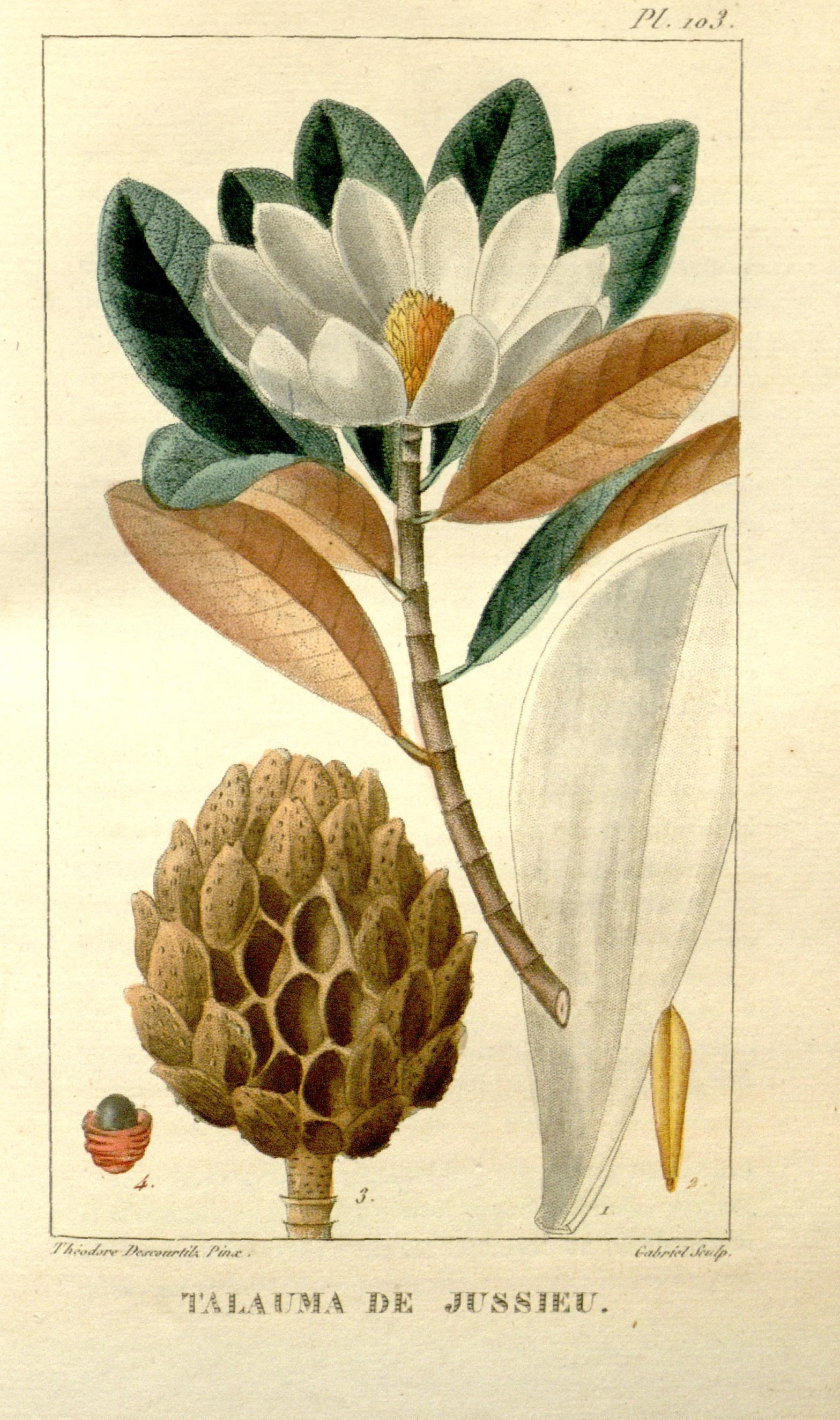

Scientific classification
- Kingdom: Plantae
- Clade: Embryophytes
- Clade: Tracheophytes
- Clade: Spermatophytes
- Clade: Angiosperms
- Clade: Magnoliids
- Order: Magnoliales
- Family: Magnoliaceae
- Genus: Magnolia
- Section: Magnolia sect. Talauma
- Species: M. dodecapetala

Binomial name
- Magnolia dodecapetala (Lam.) Govaerts

Synonyms
- Annona dodecapetala Lam.; Magnolia fatiscens Rich. ex DC.; Magnolia linguifolia L. ex Descourt.; Magnolia ovata P.Parm.; Magnolia plumieri Sw.; Talauma caerulea J.St.-Hil.; Talauma dodecapetala (Lam.) Urb.; Talauma plumieri (Sw.) DC.

= Magnolia dodecapetala =

Species of flowering plant

Magnolia dodecapetala is a species of flowering plant in the genus Magnolia, family Magnoliaceae. It is a tree native to the Leeward Islands and Windward Islands of the Caribbean. It was described by a French naturalist named Lamarck, and it obtained its current name from a Belgian botanist named Rafaël Herman Anna Govaerts.
