= Magnolia amazonica =

Conservation status
- Least Concern (IUCN 3.1)

Scientific classification
- Kingdom: Plantae
- Clade: Embryophytes
- Clade: Tracheophytes
- Clade: Spermatophytes
- Clade: Angiosperms
- Clade: Magnoliids
- Order: Magnoliales
- Family: Magnoliaceae
- Genus: Magnolia
- Section: Magnolia sect. Talauma
- Species: M. amazonica

Binomial name
- Magnolia amazonica (Ducke) Govaerts

Synonyms
- Talauma amazonica Ducke

Species of tree

Magnolia amazonica is a flowering evergreen tree of the family Magnoliaceae native to the lower western Amazon River Basin, including Peru and Brazil.

== Description ==
Magnolia amazonica grows up to 20 metres (66 ft) high, in terra firma tropical lowland forests. Leaves are elliptic, 11 - 28.5 cm long and 4.2 - 10.5 cm broad. The creamy white fragrant flowers reportedly open at night, petals can be 6 – 7 cm long.
