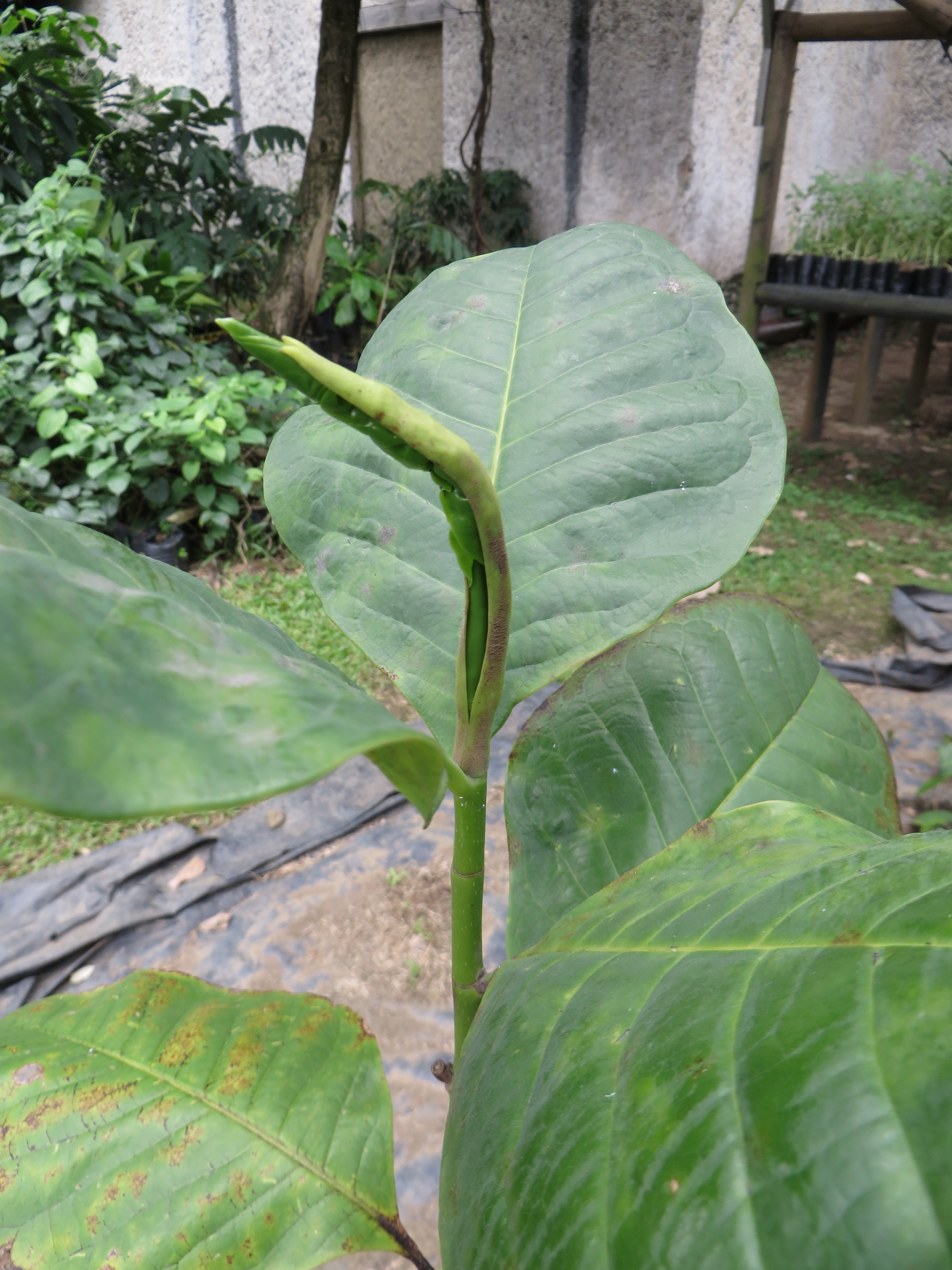

Conservation status
- Endangered (IUCN 3.1)

Scientific classification
- Kingdom: Plantae
- Clade: Embryophytes
- Clade: Tracheophytes
- Clade: Spermatophytes
- Clade: Angiosperms
- Clade: Magnoliids
- Order: Magnoliales
- Family: Magnoliaceae
- Genus: Magnolia
- Section: Magnolia sect. Talauma
- Subsection: Magnolia subsect. Dugandiodendron
- Species: M. yarumalense

Binomial name
- Magnolia yarumalense (Lozano) Govaerts

= Magnolia yarumalense =

Species of flowering plant

Magnolia yarumalense is a species of plant in the family Magnoliaceae. It is endemic to Colombia. Common names include: Gallinazo morado, gallinazo (Andes and Jardín), boñigo (Barbosa), almanegra (Santa Rosa de Osos and Yarumal).

== Description ==
They are trees reaching up to 30 m height and 70 cm in diameter. The heartwood is dark green. Leaves alternate, simple, spirally arranged, obovate, coriaceous, measuring from 14.4 to 25.5 cm long and from 15 to 29.2 cm broad; short and tomentose pubescence on the bottom, much more noticeable in the main vein, and can be felt by touching it; the stipules are large and covered with short and soft pubescence. The flowers are cream color, with a bract on the flower bud covered with a short and deciduous indumentum; they have three sepals and eight thick petals. The fruits are elliptical and asymmetric, measuring from 4.2 to 6.7 cm large and from 3.2 to 3.6 cm broad; the central axis of the fruit has a length of 4.5 to 5.3 cm and 1.4 to 1.7 cm wide; opens irregularly due to the detachment of its carpels. Each carpel has 1 to 2 seeds and in total may contain about 27 seeds; many of them are not fully developed. The seeds have a fleshy scarlet red aromatic cover, with characteristic odor.

== Habitat and distribution ==
It is distributed in two regions of Antioquia department: center and the north of central Andes between the municipalities of Barbosa, Anorí, Amalfi, Carolina del Príncipe, Santa Rosas de Osos and Yarumal; and southeast, on the eastern Andes between the towns of Andes, Ciudad Bolivar y Jardin. Grows in low montane wet forests, between 1'800 and 2'600 meters. This species has also been recorded on the north of Risalda department on the Western Andes in the Tatamá National Natural Park.

== Uses ==
This species, like many other Magnolias, have been used since a long time for furniture making, as roundwood (utility poles, wooden sticks and pillars) and as sawtimber (wood boards and scantlings). The wood is fine and commercially appreciates by its dark green color, which might be the reason for its common names of boñigo, almanegra and gallinazo morado. The species also has potential do be used as ornamental.

== Conservation ==
It is listed in category "Endangered" (EN) in the Red Book of Plants of Colombia and as "Endangered" (EN) by the IUCN Red List of Threatened Species. This is due to selective logging and the destruction and fragmentation of their forests.

== Reproductive phenology ==
The trees of this species produce flowers along the year; however, the higher production is concentrated in the dry season and the beginning of rainy season (between the months of December and May). Most trees have fruits all year round; however, very few of them reach maturity due to mass abortion of flowers and fruits at different stages of development. Ripe fruits can be found in any season given the dispersion of reproductive events; nevertheless it is during August, September and October that the best harvest has been done. The time of formation and development of the fruits is around 4 to 5 months.

== Seed management, sexual propagation and nursery production ==
=== Fruit and seed description ===
The fruits are elliptical and asymmetric, measured from 4.2 to 6.7 cm long and from 3.2 to 3.6 cm wide; the central axis of the fruit has a length of 4.5 to 5.3 cm and from 1.4 to 1.7 cm wide; they open irregularly by detachment of the carpels. Each carpel has 1 to 2 seeds, and in total may contain about 27 seeds, many of them are not fully developed. The seeds have a fleshy scarlet red aromatic cover; the seed coat is hard, smooth, dark brown to black; their shape is triangular, measuring from 8.5 to 10.1 mm wide and from 8.3 to 9.1 mm high and from 3.9 to 4.6 mm thick. The moisture content of fresh seeds can be about 25.4%. The weight of 1'000 seeds ranges between 144 and 166 grams and one kilogram can contain between 6'000 and 7'000 seeds.

=== Collecting and processing the fruits ===
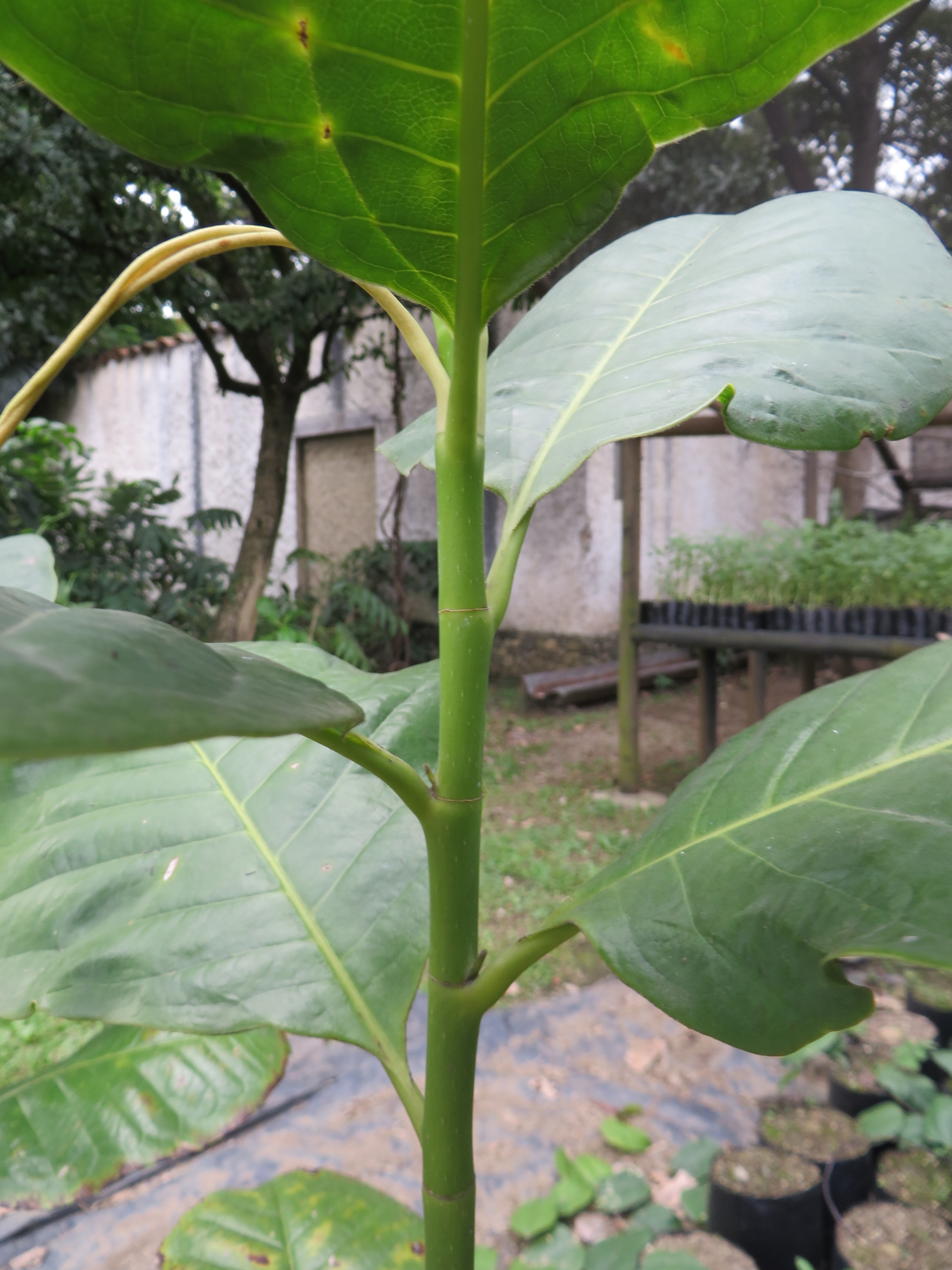
Detail M. yarumalense

Fruits should be harvested during the months of August, September and October (high rainfall) that is the time which higher concentration of fruits. The fruits and the seeds can be collected directly from the ground, however, the falling green fruits usually contain few seeds developed; it is common to find fruits and seeds that are decomposed or attacked by insects. To avoid losses, plastic tarp can be placed under the canopy to collect material falling from the tree.

Another possibility is to climb the tree and collect seeds directly from open fruits or collect ripe fruits that are still closed and put in the post-mature processing and thereby control the process of dehiscence. If the tree is difficult to climb or the equipment is not adequate, the material can be collected using an extension pruning pole. The collecting features some of the following disadvantages: the fruits and seeds are susceptible to insect attacks, or are eaten by wildlife since they are an important source of food; many fruits that are still green with immature seeds are aborted; ripe fruits can dehiscence and drop the seeds. Because of this, the scarcity of individuals of this species, low seed production, the harvest time is still unknown, it has been necessary to develop an appropriate system in order to optimize the collection. The system consist in build a basket using wire and plastic mesh (with mesh size of 1 mm or less). This way it is possible to overcome the disadvantages mentioned and collect (manually or using an extension pruning pole) the green fruits that are closed to post-mature, open ripe fruits with the seeds still attached to the central axis or detached seeds. In all collection systems described above, the selection of seeds should be done. Seeds that present biotic or abiotic damage or any kind of infestation should be discard.

=== Seed storage ===
In accordance with previous studies it is not advisable to keep the seeds, because they are very sensitive to desiccation and they lose their viability. Nevertheless, if it is not possible to proceed to the sowing immediately we can keep it in the fridge for few days with the red sarcotesta in a closed container with wet substratum (sawdust or sans, among others) at low temperatures (4 °C approx.).

=== Sowing and germination ===
These seeds do not require a pre-germination treatment. Before sowing, it is advisable to stir the sarcotesta of the seeds, clean it with running water and emerge it into a solution of 1% sodium hypochlorite during 15 minutes to avoid fungal infestations. When these seeds are sowed in a substratum with soil under obscurity conditions could have a germination capacity that oscillates between 80 and 90%. Germination starts between 39 and 46 days after sowing and is completed between 20 and 30 days after. Nevertheless, when seeds germinate in a black bag with sawdust substratum the germination capacity oscillates between 68 and 100%, stars 55 days after sowing and is completed 2 months after. The germination is epigeous and starts each one month and a half after sowing and is completed 30 days after approx. Seedlings present a high percentage of survival within the replanting.

=== Handling of seedlings in nursery ===
It is advisable to proceed to the dissemination as follows: we put some seeds in a black bag and with wet sawdust, after we close the bag and we leave in a nursery. This method allows to minimize the space used, does not present continuous risk, it is easier to control the insects attacks and/or pathogen, the substratum used is cheap and easy to get, the vegetal material produced is of good quality, among others advantages. It is recommendable to monitoring periodically in order to extract the seedling germinated. If we do not do this, the seedlings could suffer morpho-physiological damages such as malformation of the root system and forming mould. Other aspect to take in consideration is the position of the seed in open bags. It is important to sow it in a flat shape because that assures that the radicle is going to contact the substratum rapidly. When we sow in obscurity, once germinated, it is advisable to replant rapidly to avoid physiological problems such as moulding. The seedlings of this species present a high percentage of survival after replanting. They are plants of rapid growth initially and after slow. It is recommendable to keep it under shade or semi-shade.
