= Magnolia dixonii =

Conservation status
- Endangered (IUCN 3.1)

Scientific classification
- Kingdom: Plantae
- Clade: Embryophytes
- Clade: Tracheophytes
- Clade: Spermatophytes
- Clade: Angiosperms
- Clade: Magnoliids
- Order: Magnoliales
- Family: Magnoliaceae
- Genus: Magnolia
- Section: Magnolia sect. Talauma
- Species: M. dixonii

Binomial name
- Magnolia dixonii (Little) Govaerts

Synonyms
- Talauma dixonii Little

Species of flowering plant

Magnolia dixonii is a species of flowering plant in the family Magnoliaceae. It is a tree endemic to Ecuador. It is known commonly as cucharillo.

Its natural habitat is subtropical or tropical moist lowland forests. If the Magnolia family is treated as consisting of a large number of smaller genera, then this species is placed in genus Talauma. In modern literature, it is customary to treat Magnolia as a large genus, and in that case, this species is treated as belonging to section Talauma in subgenus Magnolia.
