= Magnolia sambuensis =

Conservation status
- Near Threatened (IUCN 3.1)

Scientific classification
- Kingdom: Plantae
- Clade: Embryophytes
- Clade: Tracheophytes
- Clade: Spermatophytes
- Clade: Angiosperms
- Clade: Magnoliids
- Order: Magnoliales
- Family: Magnoliaceae
- Genus: Magnolia
- Section: Magnolia sect. Talauma
- Species: M. sambuensis

Binomial name
- Magnolia sambuensis (Pittier) Govaerts

Synonyms
- Talauma sambuensis Pittier

Species of flowering plant

Magnolia sambuensis is a species of flowering plant in the family Magnoliaceae. It is a tree native to northwestern Colombia and Panama. It is threatened by habitat loss.
