= Magnolia boliviana =

Conservation status
- Endangered (IUCN 3.1)

Scientific classification
- Kingdom: Plantae
- Clade: Embryophytes
- Clade: Tracheophytes
- Clade: Spermatophytes
- Clade: Angiosperms
- Clade: Magnoliids
- Order: Magnoliales
- Family: Magnoliaceae
- Genus: Magnolia
- Section: Magnolia sect. Talauma
- Species: M. boliviana

Binomial name
- Magnolia boliviana (M.Nee) Govaerts

Synonyms
- Talauma boliviana M.Nee

Species of tree

Magnolia boliviana is a tree in the family Magnoliaceae native to the rainforests of the eastern Andean foothills of Bolivia.

== Description ==
Magnolia boliviana is a tree of 30 m with a trunk of 50–75 cm in diameter. The smooth ovate-elliptic leaves are 12–29 cm long and 7.5–12 cm wide. The flowers have 6 obovate white petals ca. 6 cm long; the ovoid fruit can be 11–14 cm long. It is known as granadilla.

== Distribution and habitat ==
In Bolivia, in rainforests in elevations between 200–500 meters. It is reported to occur in Isiboro Secure National Park, Arroyo Negro National Park and Madidi National Park.

== Conservation ==
The IUCN has assigned it the endangered conservation status. It is threatened by habitat loss due to timber harvesting and clearance of forests for the production of cocaine.
