= Quercus brevicalyx =

Conservation status
- Data Deficient (IUCN 3.1)

Scientific classification
- Kingdom: Plantae
- Clade: Embryophytes
- Clade: Tracheophytes
- Clade: Spermatophytes
- Clade: Angiosperms
- Clade: Eudicots
- Clade: Rosids
- Order: Fagales
- Family: Fagaceae
- Genus: Quercus
- Subgenus: Quercus subg. Cerris
- Section: Quercus sect. Cyclobalanopsis
- Species: Q. brevicalyx

Binomial name
- Quercus brevicalyx A.Camus

Synonyms
- Cyclobalanopsis yingjiangensis Y.C.Hsu & Q.Z.Dong; Quercus yingjiangensis (Y.C.Hsu & Q.Z.Dong) Govaerts

Species of oak tree

Quercus brevicalyx, synonym Quercus yingjiangensis, is an uncommon Asian species of tree in the beech family Fagaceae. It is native to southwestern Yunnan Province in southwestern China and to Laos.

Quercus brevicalyx is a tree up to 20 meters tall. Twigs are dark purple. Leaves can be as much as 12 cm long.
