= Magnolia mexicana =

Mexican magnolia

Conservation status
- Vulnerable (IUCN 3.1)

Scientific classification
- Kingdom: Plantae
- Clade: Embryophytes
- Clade: Tracheophytes
- Clade: Spermatophytes
- Clade: Angiosperms
- Clade: Magnoliids
- Order: Magnoliales
- Family: Magnoliaceae
- Genus: Magnolia
- Section: Magnolia sect. Talauma
- Species: M. mexicana

Binomial name
- Magnolia mexicana DC.

Synonyms
- Talauma mexicana (DC.) G.Don

Species of flowering plant

Magnolia mexicana, the Mexican magnolia, is a species of magnolia that is found in parts of Mexico, Guatemala and Honduras. The flower is known in parts of Mexico as yolloxochitl, an Aztec word that loosely translates to heart-shaped flower. The Mexican magnolia, often described as having a strong beautiful scent, has been used throughout the years for its medicinal properties, as it is said to have similar compounds to that of the Digitalis medication.

== Etymology ==
The word yolloxochitl is from the Aztec language Nahuatl and it loosely translates to heart-shaped flower after its rose-like appearance of unopened buds. Even though the plant is called a Mexican magnolia, it has differing names throughout the regions it is located and often describe its beautiful scent or its heart-shaped characteristics.

The genus Magnolia ranges throughout the Americas and parts of Asia. Magnolias are one of the oldest groups of flowering plants on the planet, and have fossil records that date back over 100 million years.

== Description ==
This species is a large tree. The leaves of most magnolias are green to dark green in color, covered in wax, and have a smooth edge to the blades. Flowers are monoecious as each flower contains both the male and female reproductive organs of the plant. The tree can reach heights of up to 80 feet as they tower over the forests in the Central American regions of Mexico, Guatemala, and Honduras.

Flowers are generally white. They have no distinguishable sepal and petals and therefore have what is called a tepal, a combination of the two with the petals having a strong texture to handle the beetle pollinators. They have their stamens sprouting from the ovary at the base of the flower that they will lose after pollination to allow for the ovary to develop the seeds. The seeds are than protected by cone-like coverings that further protect the seed from damage.

== Range and habitat ==
Magnolia mexicana is found on the humid Gulf Coastal Plain of southeastern Mexico, on the adjacent gulfward-facing slopes of the Sierra Madre Oriental and Sierra Madre de Oaxaca, and in the coastal Sierra de los Tuxtlas, in the states of Puebla, Veracruz, and Oaxaca. It ranges from 150 to 2000 meters elevation. It also ranges into Guatemala and Honduras.

It is generally found in mature humid tropical forests, including lowland rain forests and montane cloud forests.

Habitat destruction has greatly reduced and fragmented species' population. Much of its old-growth forest habitat has been cleared for agriculture, cattle raising, and timber harvesting.

== Human use ==
The Mexican magnolia has been used extensively for medicinal purposes. The flower has also been used in culinary settings as well as being a source for lumber. Magnolia's in general, are also used for decorative purposes in places such as golf courses or other bigger settings due to their beautiful blooming colors and strong fragrance.

=== Medical ===
All the parts of the tree including flowers have been used for generations, mostly as teas, as a means to treat specific medicinal conditions. The bark of the tree is said to aid in controlling fevers and also as an herbal medicine to treat some heart conditions with the properties of this plant said to mimic those of the medication, Digitalis. Further, the flowers are also used to treat various ailments including fever, heart conditions, epilepsy, and infertility. The flower can also be infused and used as an aphrodisiac. The chemical properties and medicinal properties of the Mexican magnolia have not been researched in depth and therefore remain relatively misunderstood. Therefore, it is of great importance to be cautious of taking teas and preparations that have not been researched for side effects or adverse effects.

=== Culinary ===
The leaves of the Mexican magnolia have been used in the culinary setting to flavor chocolate and other foods and have been used in the flavoring of cacao during the time of the Aztecs and Mayans.

=== Lumber ===
The Mexican magnolia has also been used for lumber and therefore it has begun to run the risk of extinction in some regions, particularly in Guatemala, where the tree has been extensively cut and used. The wood of the Mexican magnolia, and in general all magnolias, are said to be of high quality and therefore leads to their shrinking numbers in regions where deforestation is rampant and no sustainable measures are in place to preserve the species in that region.
