= Eduino Carbonó =

Colombian botanist

Eduino Carbonó de la Hoz (born June 4, 1950) is a Colombian botanist. He is Director of the Botanical Gardens of Santa Marta.

In 1974, he obtained a degree in agronomy from the Technological University of Magdalena, and later a master's degree in biology, specialising in plant systematics, from the National University of Colombia, with a thesis on the ethnobotanical study of the Kogi community of the Sierra Nevada de Santa Marta.
