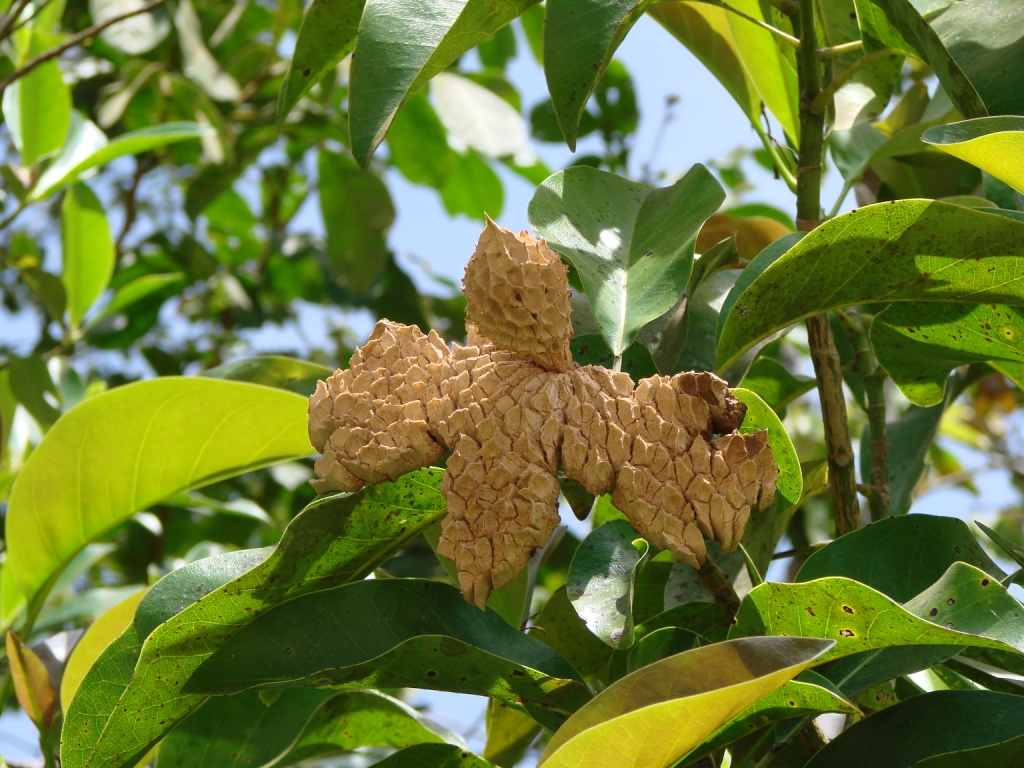
- Fruit of Magnolia ovata, typical for a former Talauma species

Scientific classification
- Kingdom: Plantae
- Clade: Tracheophytes
- Clade: Angiosperms
- Clade: Magnoliids
- Order: Magnoliales
- Family: Magnoliaceae
- Genus: Magnolia
- Section: Magnolia sect. Talauma

= Magnolia sect. Talauma =

Section of plant genus

Magnolia sect. Talauma is a section of the genus Magnolia in the family Magnoliaceae. It was formerly treated as the separate genus Talauma. It contains only New World species, and is native to Mexico, Panama, Brazil, and the West Indies.

== Taxonomy ==
In 1879, Antoine de Jussieu created the genus Talauma for the species Magnolia plumieri (now a synonym of Magnolia dodecapetala). In 1866, Henri Baillon reduced the genus to a section of Magnolia, M. sect. Talauma. The taxon has also been treated as a subgenus and as a subsection of Magnolia. It contains about 96 species.

=== Some former Talauma species ===
- Talauma amazonica Ducke → Magnolia amazonica
- Talauma boliviana M.Nee → Magnolia boliviana
- Talauma caricifragrans Loz.-Contr. → Magnolia caricifragrans
- Talauma cespedesii Triana & Planch. → Magnolia cespedesii
- Talauma dixonii Little → Magnolia dixonii
- Talauma espinalii Loz.-Contr. → Magnolia espinalii
- Talauma georgii Loz.-Contr. → Magnolia georgii
- Talauma gilbertoi Loz.-Contr. → Magnolia gilbertoi
- Talauma gloriensis Pittier → Magnolia gloriensis
- Talauma henaoi Loz.-Contr. → Magnolia henaoi
- Talauma hernandezii → Magnolia hernandezii, molinillo o copachí
- Talauma katiorum Loz.-Contr. → Magnolia katiorum
- Talauma mexicana (DC.) G.Don. → Magnolia mexicana
- Talauma minor Urb. → Magnolia minor
- Talauma narinensis Loz.-Contr. → Magnolia narinensis
- Talauma neillii Lozano → Magnolia neillii
- Talauma polyhypsophylla Loz.-Contr. → Magnolia polyhypsophylla
- Talauma rimachii Loz.-Contr. → Magnolia rimachii
- Talauma sambuensis Pittier → Magnolia sambuensis
- Talauma santanderiana Loz.-Contr. → Magnolia santanderiana
- Talauma virolinensis Loz.-Contr. → Magnolia virolinensis
- Talauma wolfii Loz.-Contr. → Magnolia wolfii
