= Gustavo Lozano (botanist) =

Colombian botanist

Gustavo Lozano-Contreras (1938–2000) was a Colombian botanist. He was a Professor of Botany at the Instituto de Ciencias Naturales de la Universidad Nacional in Colombia.

With Eduino Carbonó, he described 125 species of plants endemic to Sierra Nevada de Santa Marta in Colombia.

He served as Director of Botany in the Science Faculty of the National University of Colombia in Bogotá.
