= Rafaël Govaerts =

Belgian botanist, noted for plant taxonomy

Rafaël Herman Anna Govaerts
- Born: 1968 (age 57–58)
- Scientific career
- Fields: Botany, Taxonomy
- Author abbrev. (botany): Govaerts

Rafaël Herman Anna Govaerts (born 1968) is a Belgian botanist. He is particularly noted for his work on plant taxonomy.

He studied a Bachelor in Science at the European University College Brussels (EHSAL), and since 1994, has worked at the Royal Botanic Gardens, Kew. He is the principal contributor to the World Checklist of Selected Plant Families, which was completed in 2023, and will continue to be updated as Plants of the World Online.

He is also a Fellow of the Linnean Society of London.

== External sources ==
Royal Botanic Gardens Kew Staff Profile
