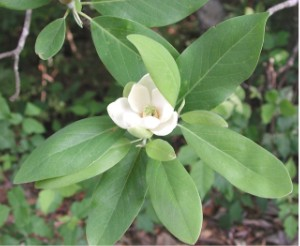
- Magnolia virginiana
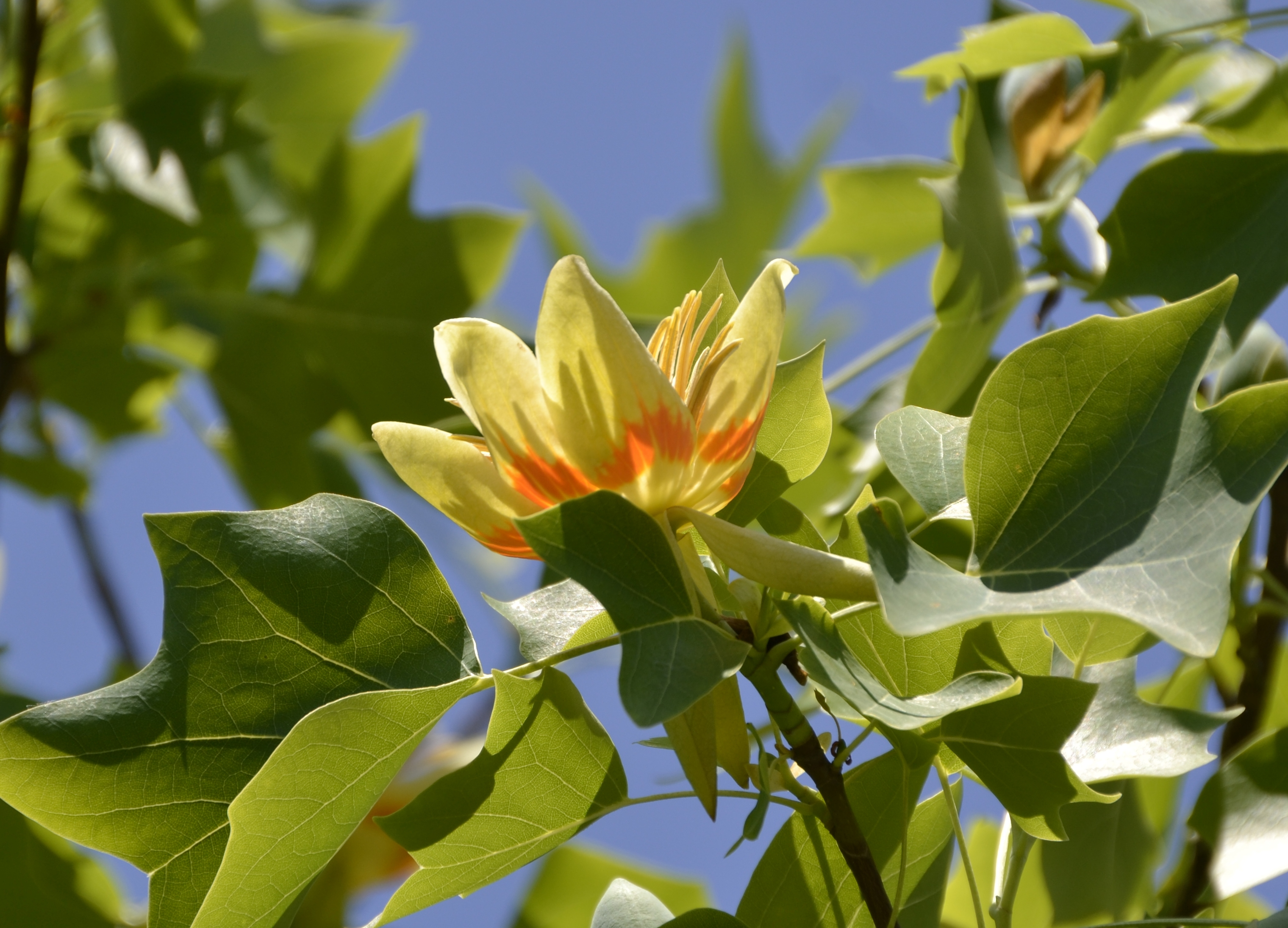
- Liriodendron tulipifera

Scientific classification
- Kingdom: Plantae
- Clade: Embryophytes
- Clade: Tracheophytes
- Clade: Spermatophytes
- Clade: Angiosperms
- Clade: Magnoliids
- Order: Magnoliales
- Family: Magnoliaceae; Juss.

Genera
- Magnolia (> 200 species); Liriodendron (2 species)

= Magnoliaceae =

Magnoliaceae Temporal range: Cenomanian - recent

Family of flowering plants

The Magnoliaceae (/mæɡˌnoʊliˈeɪsii/) are a flowering plant family, the magnolia family, in the order Magnoliales. It consists of two genera: Magnolia and Liriodendron (tulip trees).

Unlike most angiosperms, whose flower parts are in whorls (rings), the Magnoliaceae have their stamens and pistils in spirals on a conical receptacle. This arrangement is found in some fossil plants and is believed to be a basal or early condition for angiosperms. The flowers also have parts not distinctly differentiated into sepals and petals, while angiosperms that evolved later tend to have distinctly differentiated sepals and petals. The poorly differentiated perianth parts that occupy both positions are known as tepals. This family has distinct fruit with brightly colored seeds.

The family has about 300 species and ranges across subtropical eastern North America, Mexico and Central America, the West Indies, tropical South America, southern and eastern India, Sri Lanka, Indochina, Malesia, China, Japan, and Korea.

There are multiple systematic and taxonomic groupings within the family leading to a continual debate. DNA sequencing is uncovering new information leading to rearrangements of these systematic and taxonomic classifications.

== Genera ==
The number of genera in Magnoliaceae is a subject of debate. Up to 17 have been recognized, including Alcimandra, Lirianthe, Manglietia, Michelia, Pachylarnax, Parakmeria, Talauma and Yulania. However, many recent studies have opted to merge all genera within subfamily Magnolioideae into the genus Magnolia. Thus, Magnoliaceae would include only two extant genera, Magnolia and Liriodendron.

== Description ==
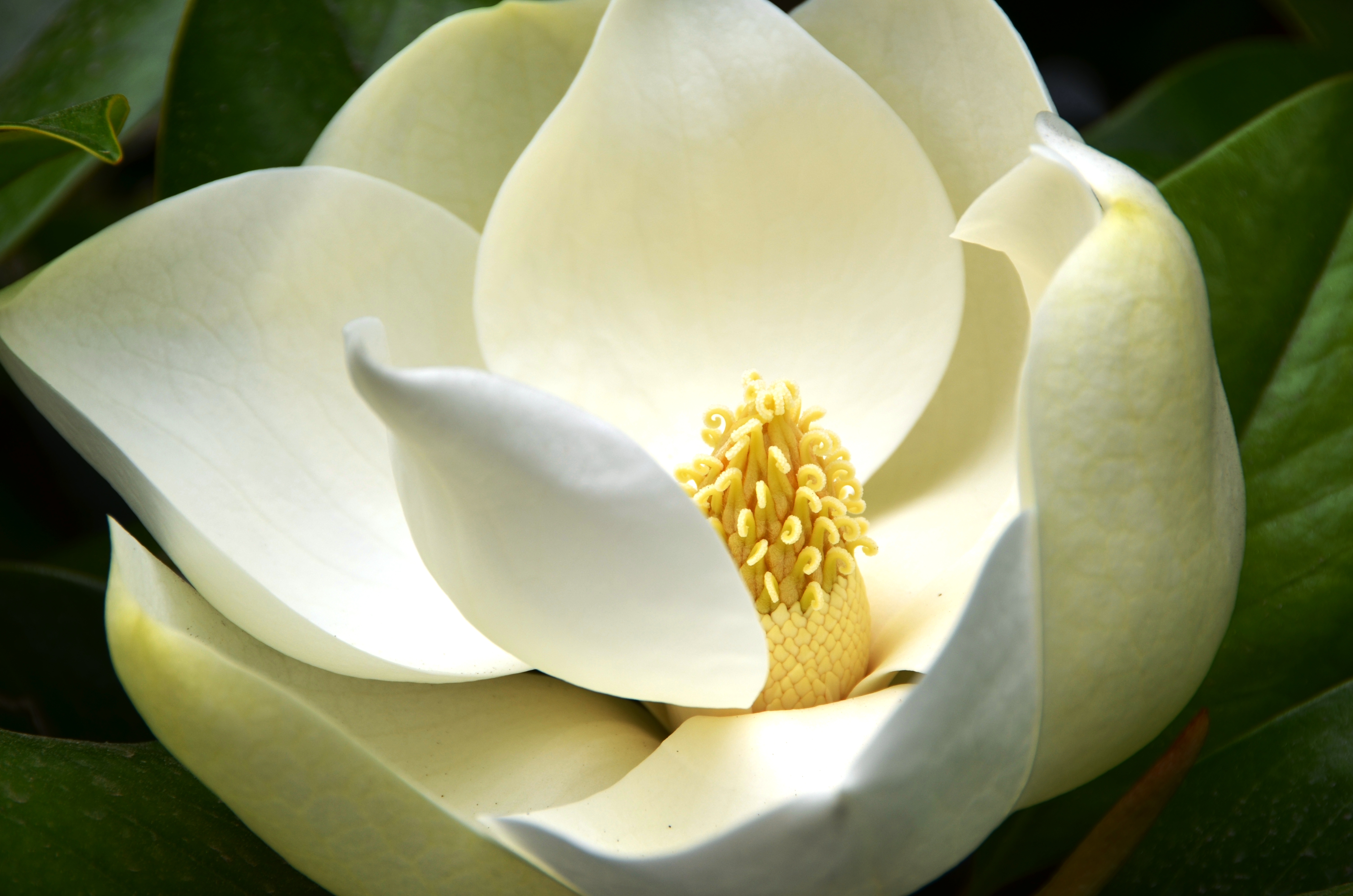
Flowers In magnolias, the tepals are arranged in whorls, and the other flower parts are arranged spirally, not in whorls.

The monophyly of Magnoliaceae is supported by a number of shared morphological characters among the various genera in the family. Most have bisexual flowers (with the exception of Kmeria and some species of Magnolia section Gynopodium), showy, fragrant, radial, and with an elongated receptacle. Leaves are alternate, simple, and sometimes lobed. The inflorescence is a solitary, showy flower with indistinguishable petals and sepals. Sepals range from six to many; stamens are numerous and feature short filaments which are poorly differentiated from the anthers. Carpels are usually numerous, distinct, and on an elongated receptacle or torus. The fruit is an aggregate fruit (etaerio) of follicles which usually become closely appressed as they mature and open along the abaxial surface. Seeds have a fleshy coat, aril, and color that ranges from red to orange (except Liriodendron). Magnoliaceae flowers are beetle pollinated, except for Liriodendron, which is bee pollinated. The carpels of Magnolia flowers are especially thick to avoid damage by beetles that land, crawl, and feast on them. The seeds of Magnolioideae are bird-dispersed, while the seeds of Liriodendron are wind-dispersed.

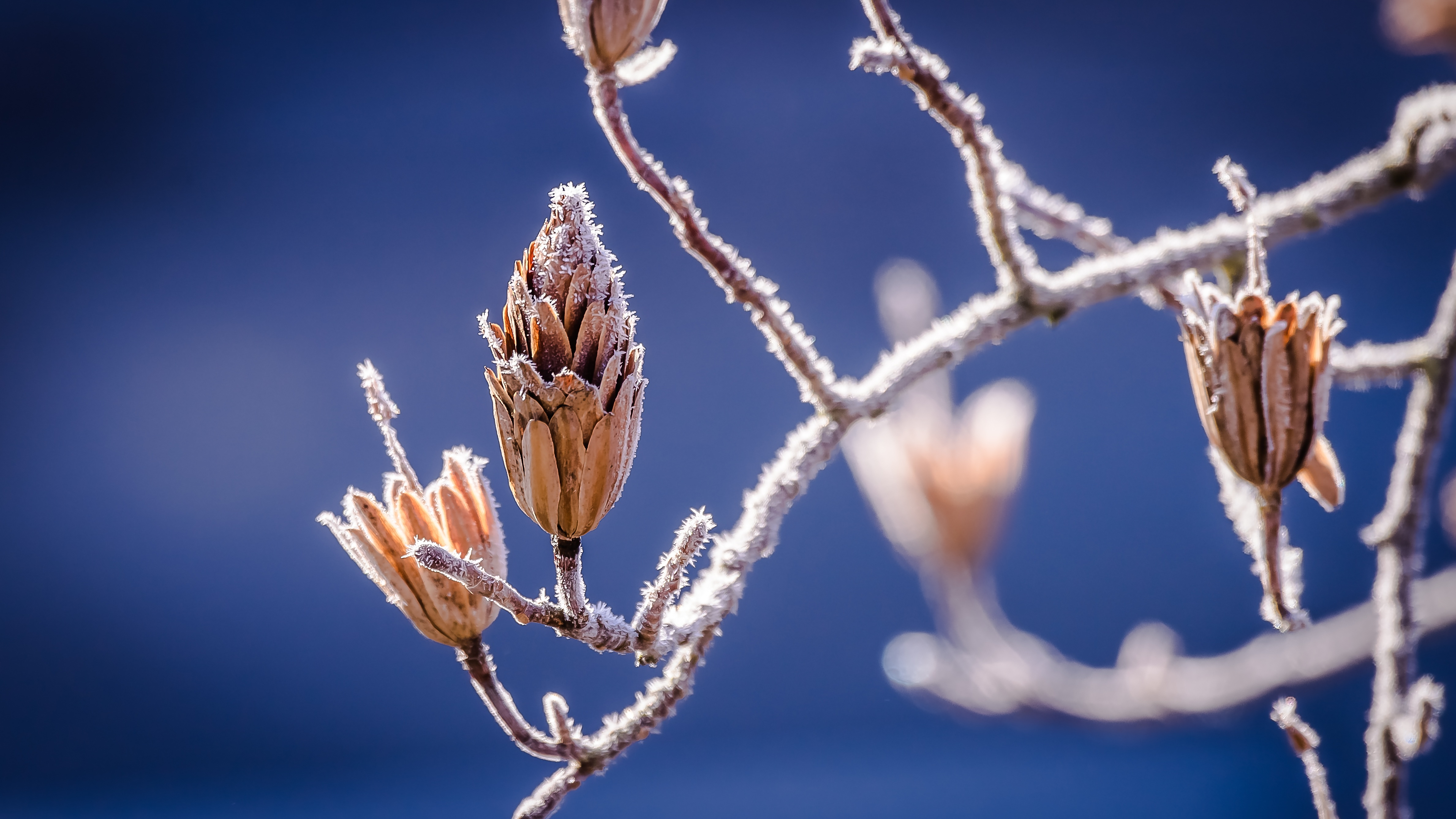
Fruit of liriodendron showing an aggregate of winged seeds.

The genus liriodendron includes two large tree species. It is found in Asia and Eastern North America. These two species have green, waxy, alternate leaves with 3-4 lobes. The petals are green to yellow with an orange base. The fruit are different from the characteristic fruits of magnolia, they are a coned shaped aggregate of samara (winged seeds).

=== Fruits and seeds ===
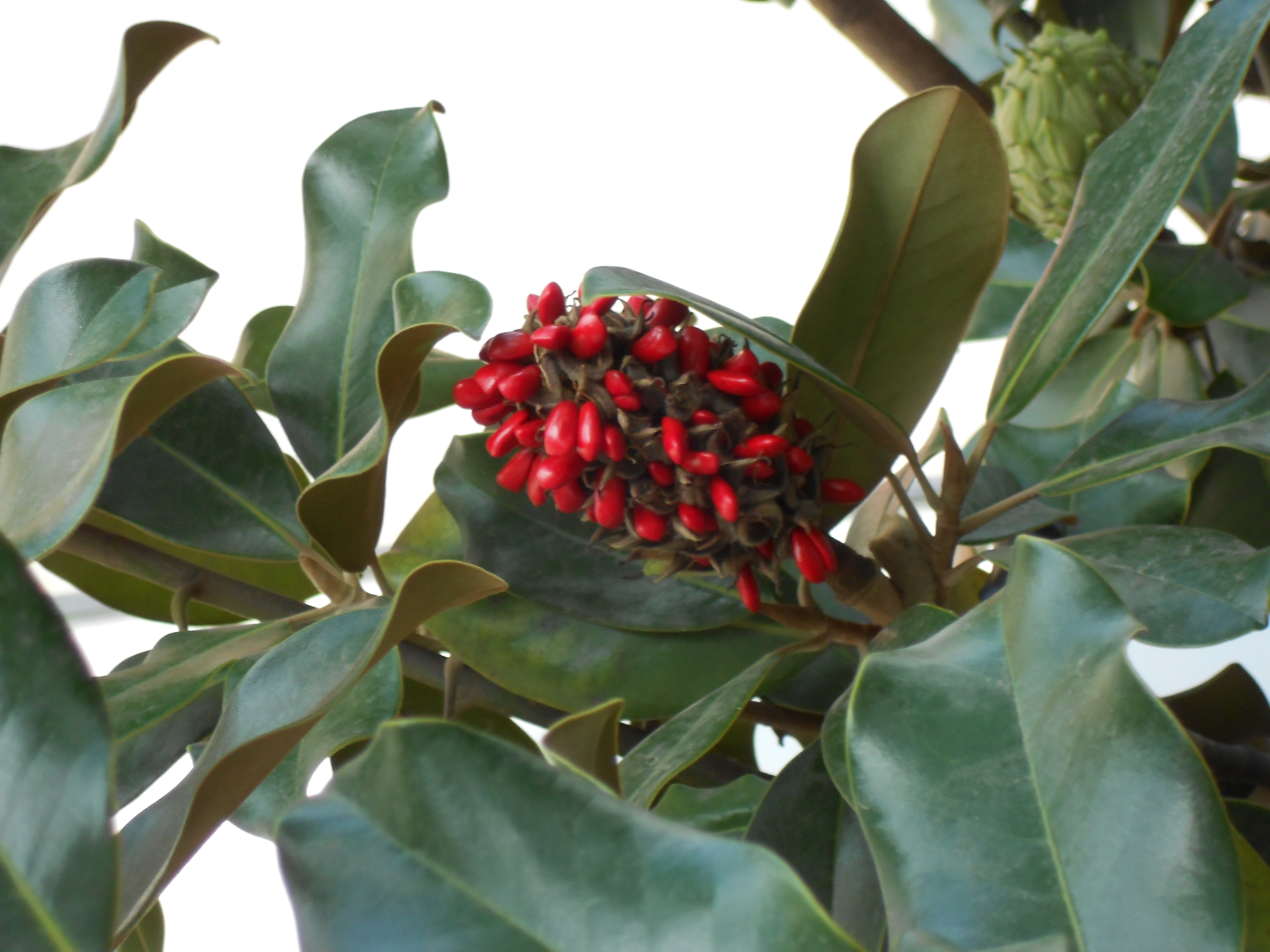
Woody fruit of Magnolia with red seeds.

A distinct feature of Magnolia is the fruit and the seeds within. In many species in the Magnolia family spirally arranged carpels form the fruit. These carpels become woody and often open (dehisce) at maturity. The fruits are aggregate fruits but often appear to be syncarps. There are multiple shapes, most commonly oblong, cone shaped, and long and linear. When the fruit reaches maturity and dehisces the seeds within become exposed. The seeds are typically red or orange in color and hang out of the fruit. Magnolia seeds get dispersed through endozoochory, meaning animals eat the seeds and spread them when they are excreted. The bright coloring of the seeds helps to attract animals and promote the dispersal of the seeds.

== Biogeography ==
Due to its great age, the geographical distribution of the Magnoliaceae has become disjunct or fragmented as a result of major geologic events such as ice ages, continental drift, and mountain formation. This distribution pattern has isolated some species, while keeping others in close contact. Extant species of the Magnoliaceae are widely distributed in temperate and tropical Asia from the Himalayas to Japan and southwest through Malaysia and New Guinea. Asia is home to about two-thirds of the species in Magnoliaceae, with the remainder of the family spread across the Americas with temperate species extending into southern Canada and tropical elements extending into Brazil and the West Indies.

== Systematics ==
=== Foundational taxonomic and systematics research (18th-19th century) ===
The earliest botanical description of the Magnoliaceae as a family is in Antonii Laurentii de Jussieu's Genera Plantarum, which describes eight genera included within the family (Euryandra, Drymis, Illicium, Michelia, Magnolia, Talauma, Liriodendrum, and Mayna) as well as four genera closely related to the family (Dillenia, Curatella, Ochna, and Quassia). Bentham and Hooker's Genera Plantarum, almost a century later, sorts the family's genera into three tribes: the Wintereae, including the genera Drimys and Illicium, the Magnolieae, including the genera Talauma, Magnolia, Manglieta, Michelia, and Liriodendron, and the Schizandreae, including the genera Schizandra and Kadsura. In his following work Adansonia, Baillon recognizes Bentham and Hooker's changes and additions but proposes an alternative taxonomy where he sets aside the Tulipier genus and include all remaining genera under one Magnolieae tribe. From this basic separation, scholars have continued to debate the systematics of the family.

=== Modern systematics research (20th-21st century) ===
Dandy's taxonomic proposal in 1927 sets aside the genus Liriodendron as a part of the subfamily Liriodendreae and includes Bentham and Hooker's four genera in addition to four more (Kmeria, Pachylarnax, Alcimandra, and Elmerrillia) within the Magnolieae tribe. Dandy's model with eleven genera was widely accepted until molecular evidence brought it into question (Figlar, 2019). Qiu et al. analyzed molecular data in 1995 to investigate the divergences within and between East Asian and East North American species of Magnolia, presenting molecular evidence which shows that Dandy's section Rytidospermum is not monophyletic. Azuma et al. employ both molecular phylogeny and parsimonious mapping of the chemistry of floral scents in 1999 to propose a phylogenetic tree where, unlike Dandy's taxonomy, they include Michelia species within the Magnolia genus as a sister group to the subgenus Yulania and also find that the section Rytidospermum is not monophyletic, placing some of its members in a clade with the section Oyama.

The most recent research on the family continues the debate over the genera of the family. Wang et al.'s study analyzes complete chloroplast genome sequences of 86 species in the Magnoliaceae and supports a phylogeny with fifteen major clades, two subfamilies, two genera, and fifteen sections, maintaining Magnolia's classification as one monophyletic genus. Dong et al. also place Magnolia as the sole genus of the subfamily Magnolioideae made up of fifteen sections. However, Yang et al. and Zhao et al. work with phylogenies of the Magnoliaceae that recognize several genera in the Magnolioideae.

=== Consensus and debates today ===
Although phylogenetic trees of the Magnoliaceae still include anywhere from 2 to 17 genera, the broad generic concept (where one genus, Magnolia, is in the Magnolioideae) is largely accepted as a practical construction upheld by molecular and morphological evidence. Even as debates over rank persist, monophyletic groups are largely established with opportunities for further research into endangered and extinct species. The family's place as early angiosperms means that research into its taxonomy and evolutionary history contributes to our broader understanding of the evolution of plant life.

The development of DNA sequencing at the end of the 20th century had a profound impact on the research of phylogenetic relationships within the family. The employment of ndhF and cpDNA sequences has refuted many of the traditionally accepted phylogenetic relationships within the Magnoliaceae. For example, the genera Magnolia and Michelia were shown to be paraphyletic when the remaining four genera of the Magnolioideae are split out. In fact, even many of the subgenera (Magnolia subg. Magnolia, Magnolia subg. Talauma) have been found to be paraphyletic. Although no completely resolved phylogeny for the family has yet been determined, these technological advances have allowed systematists to broadly circumscribe major lineages.

== Economic significance ==
As a whole, the Magnoliaceae are not an economically significant family. With the exception of ornamental cultivation, the economic significance of magnolias is generally confined to the use of wood from certain timber species and the use of bark and flowers from several species believed to possess medicinal qualities. The wood of the American tuliptree, Liriodendron tulipifera and the wood of the cucumbertree magnolia, Magnolia acuminata, and, to a lesser degree, that of the Frasier magnolia, Magnolia fraseri, are harvested and marketed collectively as "yellow poplar." This is a lightweight and exceptionally fine-grained wood, lending itself to precision woodworking for purposes such as pipe organ building.

Magnolias have a rich cultural tradition in China, where references to their healing qualities go back thousands of years. The Chinese have long used the bark of Magnolia officinalis, a magnolia native to the mountains of China with large leaves and fragrant white flowers, as a remedy for cramps, abdominal pain, nausea, diarrhea, and indigestion. Certain magnolia flowers, such as the buds of Magnolia liliiflora, have been used to treat chronic respiratory and sinus infections and lung congestion. Recently, magnolia bark has become incorporated into alternative medicine in the west, where tablets made from the bark of M. officinalis have been marketed as an aid for anxiety, allergies, asthma, and weight loss. Compounds found in magnolia bark might have antibacterial and antifungal properties, but no large-scale study on the health effects of magnolia bark or flowers has yet been conducted.
