= Michelia =

Historically recognized genus of flowering plants

Michelia is a historical genus of flowering plants belonging to the family Magnoliaceae. The genus included about 50 species of evergreen trees and shrubs, native to tropical and subtropical south and southeast Asia (Indomalaya), including southern China. Today it is regarded as a synonym and section of the genus Magnolia.

== Description ==
The Magnoliaceae are an ancient family; fossil plants identifiably belonging to the Magnoliaceae date back 95 million years. A primitive aspect of the Magnolia family is that their large, cup-shaped flowers lack distinct petals or sepals. The large non-specialized flower parts, resembling petals, are called tepals.

The leaves, flowers, and form of Michelia resemble Magnolia, but the blossoms of Michelia generally form clusters among the leaves, rather than singly at the branch ends as Magnolia does.

== Uses ==
Several of the larger species are locally important sources of timber. Some species, including the champak (Michelia champaca) and Michelia doltsopa are grown for their flowers, both on the tree and as cut flowers. Champak flowers are also used to produce an essential oil for perfume. A few species have been introduced to gardens or as street trees outside of the Indomalaya region, including Michelia figo, M. doltsopa, and M. champaca. The genus is named after the Florentine botanist Pietro Antonio Micheli (1679–1737). They grow to the height of 10–45 metres

== Recent changes in classification ==
Morphological data and molecular data recently showed that the genus Michelia is very closely related to subgenus Yulania of genus Magnolia. Many botanists now treat the genus Michelia accordingly. New combinations of names have been provided for. For further information see under genus Magnolia.

== Some former Michelia species ==
Some species formerly placed in Michelia include the following. Synonyms are from Plants of the World Online, as of March 2022.

- Michelia aenea Dandy, synonym of Magnolia foveolata Merr. ex Dandy
- Michelia × alba DC., synonym of Magnolia × alba. White champaca or white sandalwood, considered to be a hybrid between Magnolia champaca and Magnolia montana.
- Michelia calcicola C.Y. Wu ex Y.-W. Law & Y.-F. Wu, synonym of Magnolia fulva var. calcicola

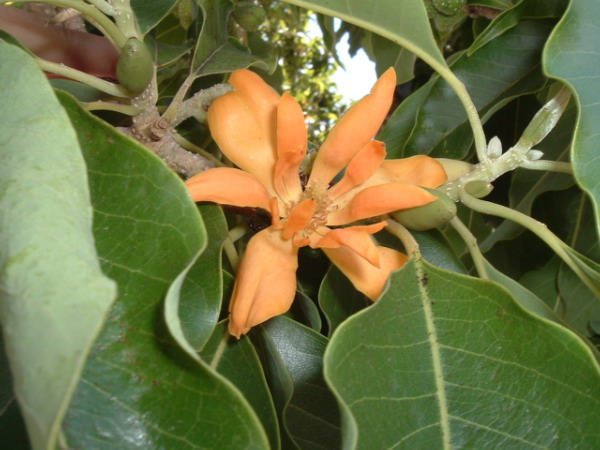
Flower and leaves of Magnolia champaca

- Michelia champaca L., synonym of Magnolia champaca. Champak. Native to India, Java, and the Philippines. A tree or shrub which grows from 3 to 6 meters high and wide. Glossy bright green leaves to 16 cm. Produces fragrant orange, yellow, or creamy white flowers in the spring. The flowers of this plant produce an essential oil that is used in perfume.
- Michelia compressa (Maxim.) Sarg., synonym of Magnolia compressa
- Michelia coriacea Hung T.Chang & B.L.Chen, synonym of Magnolia coriacea
- Michelia doltsopa Buch.-Ham. ex DC., synonym of Magnolia doltsopa. Large shrubs and trees, growing to 30 meters. Native to the eastern Himalayas and Meghalaya subtropical forests. Varies in form from bushy to narrow and upright. Leathery dark-green leaves, 6 to 17 cm in length. Clusters of creamy white flowers in winter. Growing in popularity as a street tree in coastal California.
- Michelia figo (Lour.) Spreng., synonym of Magnolia figo (basionym: Liriodendron figo Lour.) Banana shrub. A slow growing shrub or small tree that can grow up to 5 meters high and nearly as wide. Densely covered with small glossy green leaves. Bears clusters of large, white, sometimes purple-streaked, flowers with a potent, sweet banana scent. 'Port Wine' is a cultivar that bears rose to maroon flowers.
- Michelia fulgens Dandy, synonym of Magnolia foveolata
- Michelia fuscata (Andrews) Blume ex Wall., synonym Magnolia figo var. figo
- Michelia hedyosperma Y.-W. Law, synonym of Magnolia hypolampra
- Michelia hypolampra Dandy, synonym of Magnolia hypolampra
- Michelia ingrata Chen & Yang, synonym of Magnolia fulva var. fulva
- Michelia laevifolia Y.-W. Law & Y.-F. Wu, synonym of Magnolia laevifolia
- Michelia longistyla Y.-W. Law & Y.-F. Wu, synonym of Magnolia foveolata
- Michelia montana Blume, synonym of Magnolia montana.
- Michelia nilagirica Zenker, synonym of Magnolia nilagirica. Native to southern India.
- Michelia odora (W.Y. Chun) Noot. & Chen, synonym of Magnolia odora
- Michelia punduana Hook.f. & Thomson, synonym of Magnolia punduana. Native to Meghalaya subtropical forests.
- Michelia wilsonii Finet & Gagnep., synonym of Magnolia ernestii
- Michelia skinneriana Dunn, synonym of Magnolia figo var. skinneriana
- Michelia xanthantha C.Y. Wu ex Y.-W. Law & Y.-F. Wu, synonym of Magnolia xanthantha
- Michelia yunnanensis Franch. ex Finet & Gapnep., synonym of Magnolia laevifolia
