= Ten-thousand-flower Camellia =

Camellia tree at Jade Peak Temple

Coordinates: 26°59′38.67″N 100°11′43.05″E

The Ten-thousand-flower Camellia is a Camellia reticulata tree at Jade Peak Temple, near the Jade Dragon Snow Mountain in China. The plant is reputed to be over 500 years old.

It is not clear if two varieties have been grafted onto a single stock, or if the stock variety also shows in the flowering.

In a nearby courtyard a pair of Michelia yunnanensis, some 120 years old, have been trained in a similar formation.
