= Magnolia parviflora =

Magnolia parviflora can refer to the following plant species:

- Magnolia parviflora Blume, a synonym of Magnolia figo (Lour.) DC. var. figo
- Magnolia parviflora Siebold & Zucc., a synonym of Magnolia sieboldii K.Koch subsp. japonica K.Ueda
