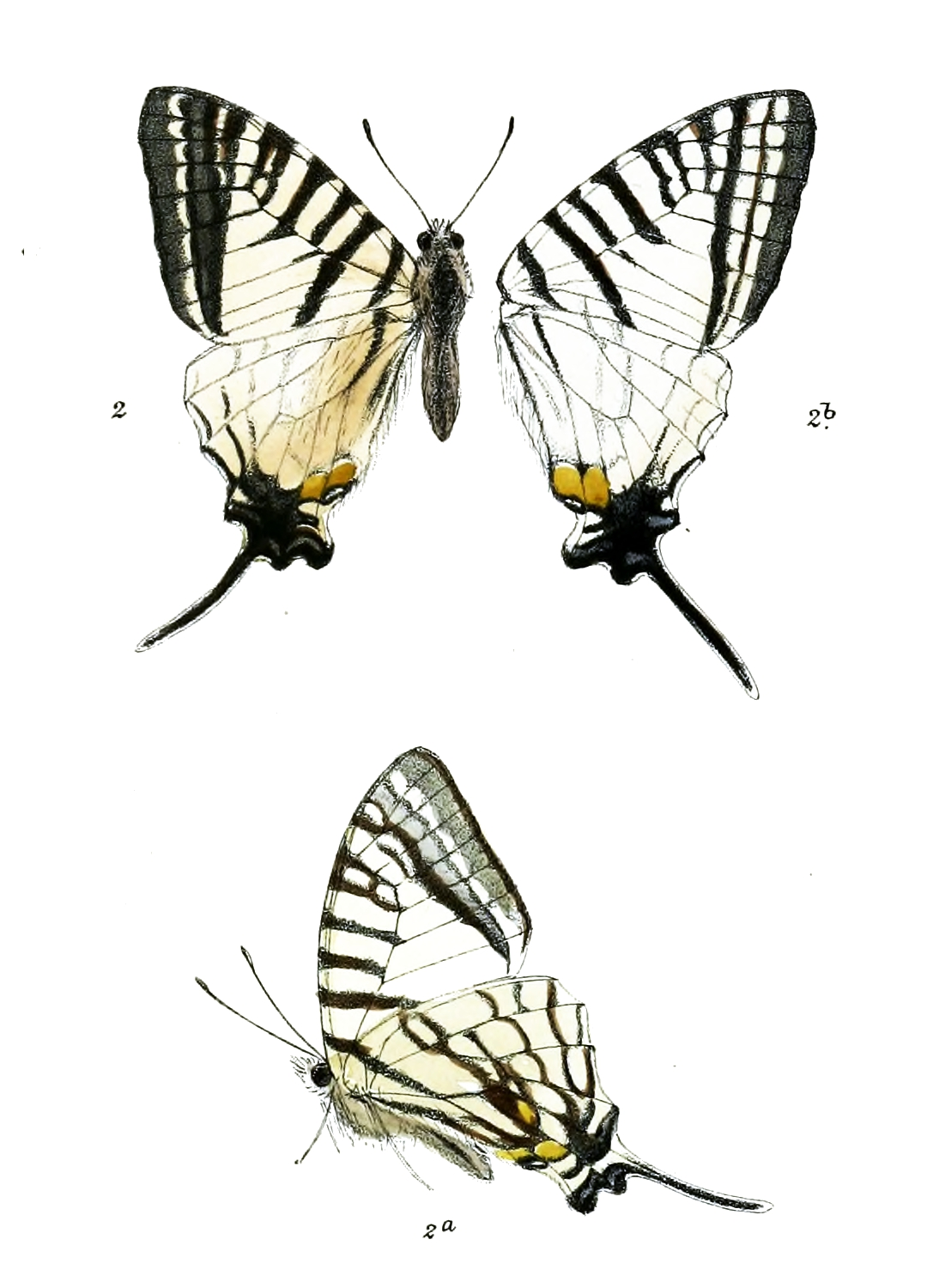

Scientific classification
- Kingdom: Animalia
- Phylum: Arthropoda
- Class: Insecta
- Order: Lepidoptera
- Family: Papilionidae
- Genus: Graphium
- Species: G. eurous

Binomial name
- Graphium eurous (Leech, 1893)

= Graphium eurous =

Sixbar swordtail

Species of butterfly

Graphium eurous, the sixbar swordtail, is a swallowtail butterfly belonging to the genus Graphium, also known as the swordtails.

== Description ==
All the bands are narrowed, being only blackish stripes on a pale yellow transparent ground, the anal area of the hindwing being alone more strongly coloured, bearing a honey-yellow anal spot which is somewhat constricted in the middle; behind this spot there is a blue-centred dot, which represents the anal ocellus.Karl Jordan in Seitz (page 86) provides a description differentiating eurous from nearby taxa and discussing some forms.

== Range ==
It is known along the Himalayas west from northern Pakistan into India (including Jammu & Kashmir, Himachal Pradesh, Garhwal and Kumaon, Sikkim, Assam, Manipur), Nepal, northern Myanmar extending into south-western and central China; and Taiwan.

== Status ==
Though overall common and not threatened, it tends to be extremely local.

== Taxonomy ==
Graphium eurous belongs to the subgenus Pazala. Suggested subspecies are:

- G. e. asakurae (Matsumura, 1908) - Taiwan.
- G. e. caschmirensis (Rothschild, 1895) - India (Jammu & Kashmir to Himachal Pradesh and Uttarakhand).
- G. e. eurous Leech 1893 - Nepal to India (Assam, Manipur, Bengal, Sikkim), possibly Bhutan, Myanmar to China (Yunnan).
- G. e. inthanon Katayama, 1986 - Thailand (Northern), Laos.
- G. e. melli Racheli & Cotton 2009 - China (Guanxi [Southern]).
- G. e. meridionalis (Mell 1935) - China (Southeast, Northern Guandong to Zhejiang).
- G. e. panopaea (de Nicéville, 1900) - China (Western provinces).
- G. e. sikkimica (Heron, 1895) - India (West Bengal, Sikkim, Arunachal Pradesh, Nagaland, Manipur and Meghalaya), Nepal.

== Habitat ==
These butterflies are found in open places in wooded country between 3,000 and 8,000 feet (910 and 2,440 m) in the Himalayas. They inhabit certain small localities and are always to be found there.

== Habits ==
While the male swordtails are rarely away from their favourite spots, the females wander abroad in search of their host plants, the laurels.

The males generally fly high up, often around a selected tree, where they can be seen settling now and then well out of reach. Occasionally, they descend close to the ground where they can be netted. The females, being less lively, fly closer to the ground, and are often found settling on their host plants.

== Life cycle ==
This species is single brooded. It regularly emerges in Himachal Pradesh area in mid-April and stays on the wing till mid-May. The brood emerges slightly earlier east of Himachal till in Assam the butterflies appear as early as January.

Usually, the females emerge much later than the males and it is not uncommon to see fresh females with wings in perfect condition being courted by males with tattered wings.

=== Caterpillar ===
The caterpillars are greenish and have black dots. It has a yellow transverse band. Each thoracic segment has a pair of spines. The anal processes are yellow and have a black tip.

=== Pupa ===
The pupas are slender, green and have four yellowish lines.

=== Food plants ===
The larval food plants of the sixbar swordtail are primarily from family Lauraceae. Haribal lists Persea odoratissima and Michelia doltsopa (family Magnoliaceae) as the larval host plants. Smetacek (2012) has reared larvae found to be feeding on Persea duthei King ex J.D. Hooker and Neolitsea umbrosa (Nees) Gamble, to adulthood.

== See also ==
- Papilionidae
- List of butterflies of India
- List of butterflies of India (Papilionidae)
