= Magnolia foveolata =

Conservation status
- Least Concern (IUCN 3.1)

Scientific classification
- Kingdom: Plantae
- Clade: Embryophytes
- Clade: Tracheophytes
- Clade: Spermatophytes
- Clade: Angiosperms
- Clade: Magnoliids
- Order: Magnoliales
- Family: Magnoliaceae
- Genus: Magnolia
- Species: M. foveolata

Binomial name
- Magnolia foveolata (Merr. ex Dandy) Figlar

Synonyms
- Magnolia aenea (Dandy) Figlar; Magnolia xinningia (Y.W.Law & R.Z.Zhou) C.B.Callaghan & Png; Michelia aenea Dandy; Michelia foveolata Merr. ex Dandy; Michelia fulgens Dandy; Michelia longistyla Y.W.Law & Y.F.Wu; Michelia oblongifolia Hung T.Chang & B.L.Chen; Michelia xinningia Y.W.Law & R.Z.Zhou

Species of tree

Magnolia foveolata is a species of flowering plant in the family Magnoliaceae. It is a tree native to southern China and northern Vietnam.
