= Magnolia fulva =

Conservation status
- Data Deficient (IUCN 3.1)

Scientific classification
- Kingdom: Plantae
- Clade: Embryophytes
- Clade: Tracheophytes
- Clade: Spermatophytes
- Clade: Angiosperms
- Clade: Magnoliids
- Order: Magnoliales
- Family: Magnoliaceae
- Genus: Magnolia
- Species: M. fulva

Binomial name
- Magnolia fulva (Hung T.Chang & B.L.Chen) Figlar

Synonyms
- Michelia fulva Hung T.Chang & B.L.Chen; Magnolia fulva var. calcicola: Michelia calcicola C.Y.Wu ex Y.W.Law & Y.F.Wu; Michelia fulva var. calcicola (C.Y.Wu ex Y.W.Law & Y.F.Wu) Sima & H.Yu; Magnolia fulva var. fulva: Magnolia glaucophylla Sima & Hong Yu; Magnolia ingrata (B.L.Chen & S.C.Yang) Figlar; Michelia glaucophylla (Sima & Hong Yu) Sima & S.G.Lu; Michelia ingrata B.L.Chen & S.C.Yang

Species of flowering plant

Magnolia fulva is a species of flowering plant in the family Magnoliaceae, native to south-central China and Vietnam. It was first described, as Michelia fulva, in 1987.

Two varieties are recognized:

- Magnolia fulva var. calcicola (C.Y.Wu ex Y.W.Law & Y.F.Wu) ined.
- Magnolia fulva var. fulva
