= Magnolia hypolampra =

Conservation status
- Data Deficient (IUCN 3.1)

Scientific classification
- Kingdom: Plantae
- Clade: Embryophytes
- Clade: Tracheophytes
- Clade: Spermatophytes
- Clade: Angiosperms
- Clade: Magnoliids
- Order: Magnoliales
- Family: Magnoliaceae
- Genus: Magnolia
- Species: M. hypolampra

Binomial name
- Magnolia hypolampra (Dandy) Figlar

Synonyms
- Magnolia gioi (A.Chev.) Noot.; Michelia gioi (A.Chev.) Sima & W.H.Chen; Michelia hedyosperma Y.W.Law; Michelia hypolampra Dandy; Talauma gioi A.Chev.

Species of tree

Magnolia hypolampra is a species of flowering plant in the family Magnoliaceae. It is a tree native to Guangxi, Hainan, and southern Yunnan in southern China and to Vietnam.
