= Annona dodecapetala =

Scientific classification
- Kingdom: Plantae
- Clade: Tracheophytes
- Clade: Angiosperms
- Clade: Magnoliids
- Order: Magnoliales
- Family: Annonaceae
- Genus: Annona
- Species: A. dodecapetala

Binomial name
- Annona dodecapetala Lam.

Species of flowering plant

Annona dodecapetala is a species of flowering plant plants in the Annona genus, Annonaceae, described by Jean-Baptiste Lamarck.
