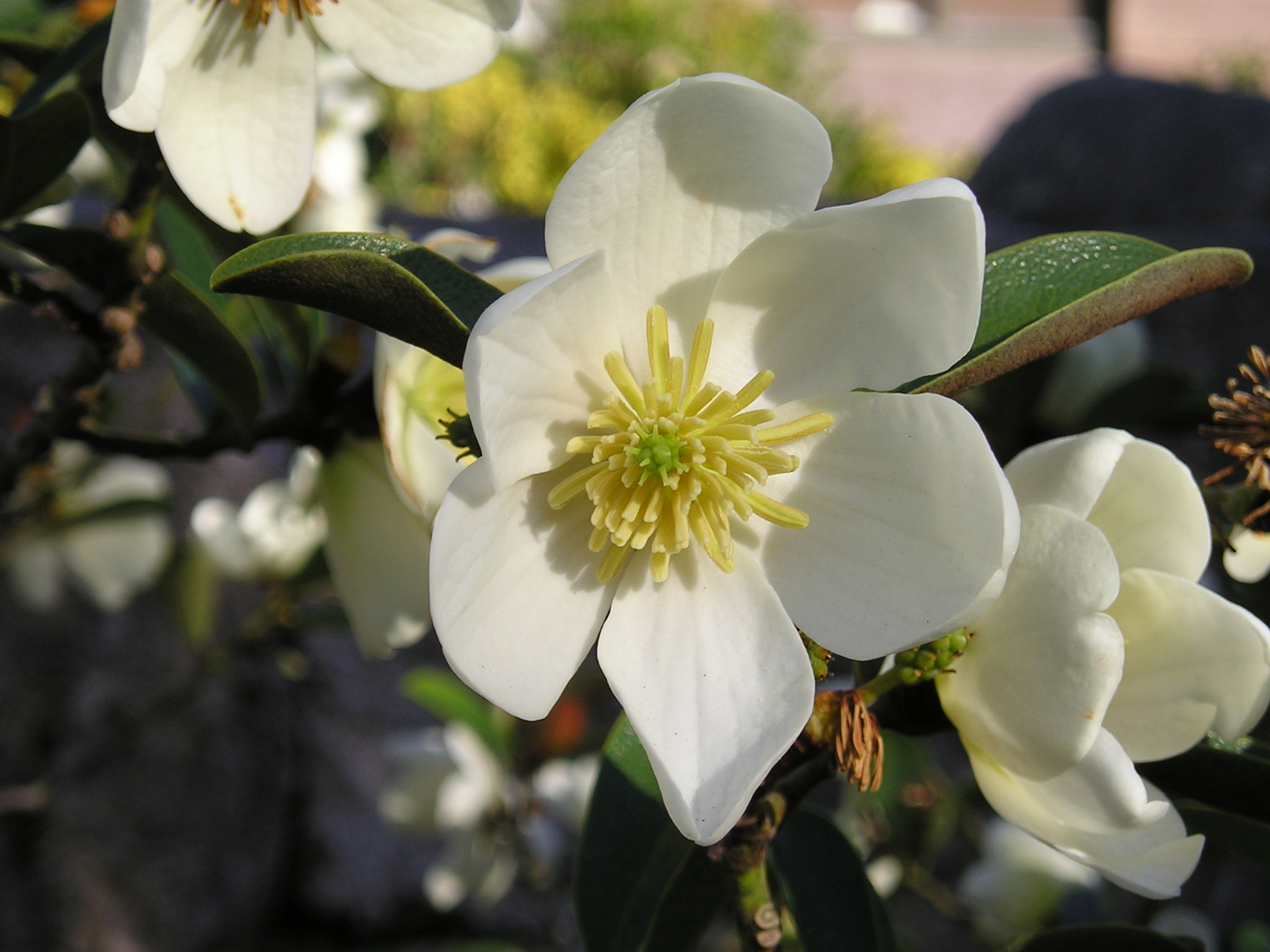
- The fragrant flowers tend to form along branches rather than terminally

Conservation status
- Data Deficient (IUCN 3.1)

Scientific classification
- Kingdom: Plantae
- Clade: Embryophytes
- Clade: Tracheophytes
- Clade: Spermatophytes
- Clade: Angiosperms
- Clade: Magnoliids
- Order: Magnoliales
- Family: Magnoliaceae
- Genus: Magnolia
- Species: M. laevifolia

Binomial name
- Magnolia laevifolia (Y.W.Law & Y.F.Wu) Noot.

Synonyms
- List: Magnolia amabilis Sima & Y.H.Wang; Magnolia concinna (H.Jiang & E.D.Liu) C.B.Callaghan & Png; Magnolia dianica Sima & Figlar; Michelia amabilis (Sima & Y.H.Wang) Y.M.Shui; Michelia concinna H.Jiang & E.D.Liu; Michelia dandyi Hu; Michelia laevifolia Y.W.Law & Y.F.Wu; Michelia yunnanensis Franch. ex Finet & Gagnep.

= Magnolia laevifolia =

Species of flowering plant

Magnolia laevifolia is a species of flowering plant in the family Magnoliaceae, native to south-central China. Hardy to USDA zone 8, it easily tolerates pruning, and can be formed into topiaries, hedges and screens. The Royal Horticultural Society recommends the 'Gail's Favourite' cultivar for small gardens.
