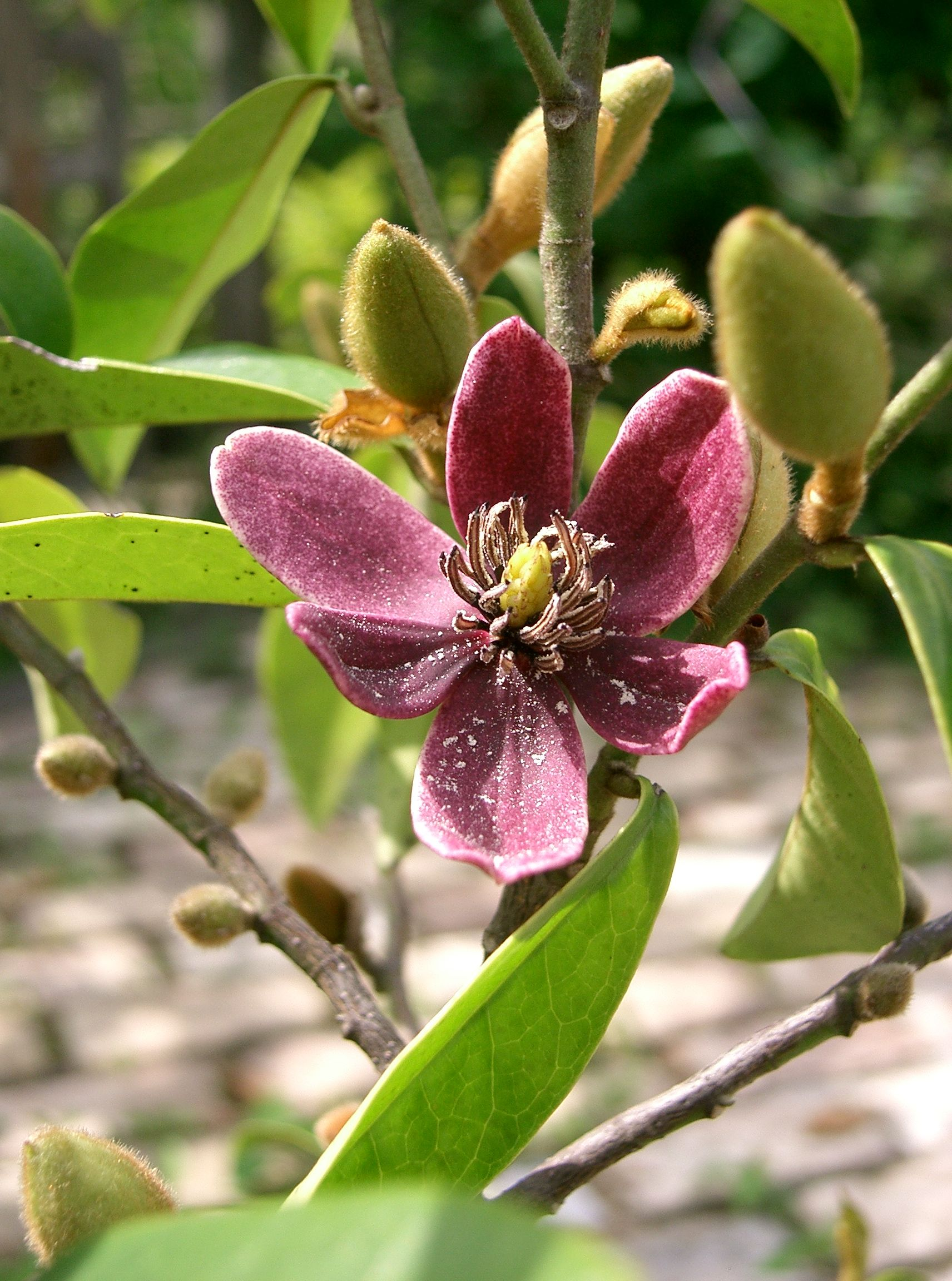
- Cultivar 'Purple Queen'

Conservation status
- Least Concern (IUCN 3.1)

Scientific classification
- Kingdom: Plantae
- Clade: Embryophytes
- Clade: Tracheophytes
- Clade: Angiosperms
- Clade: Magnoliids
- Order: Magnoliales
- Family: Magnoliaceae
- Genus: Magnolia
- Subgenus: Magnolia subg. Yulania
- Section: Magnolia sect. Michelia
- Subsection: Magnolia subsect. Michelia
- Species: M. figo

Binomial name
- Magnolia figo (Lour.) DC.

Synonyms
- Liriodendron figo Lour.; Michelia figo (Lour.) Spreng.

= Magnolia figo =

Species of tree

Magnolia figo is a species of flowering plant in the family Magnoliaceae. This evergreen tree is sometimes referred to by the common names banana shrub, and port wine magnolia. It grows to 3–4 metres (10–13 feet) tall.

Initially described by Portuguese missionary and naturalist João de Loureiro as Liriodendron figo, it was reclassified as Michelia figo by German botanist Curt Polycarp Joachim Sprengel. In 2006, a cladistic analysis of the genus Michelia found them to lie within the genus Magnolia, with the name now being Magnolia figo.

It is cultivated as an ornamental plant in gardens for its fragrant flowers, which are cream-white and sometimes yellow, purple rounded, or light-purple, and strongly scented with isoamyl alcohol. It is also popular to keep M. figo as a houseplant. Flower buds, as well as new leaves, are covered with hairs, giving it a texture similar to that of velvet. The leaves are leathery, dark glossy-green, up to 10 cm long.

This plant is used in Shanghai, China, as a tall evergreen hedge. It grows very slowly and matures into a large evergreen compact tree. It grows in acid and alkaline soil very well, but is susceptible to black soot.

== Distribution ==
It is native to China.
