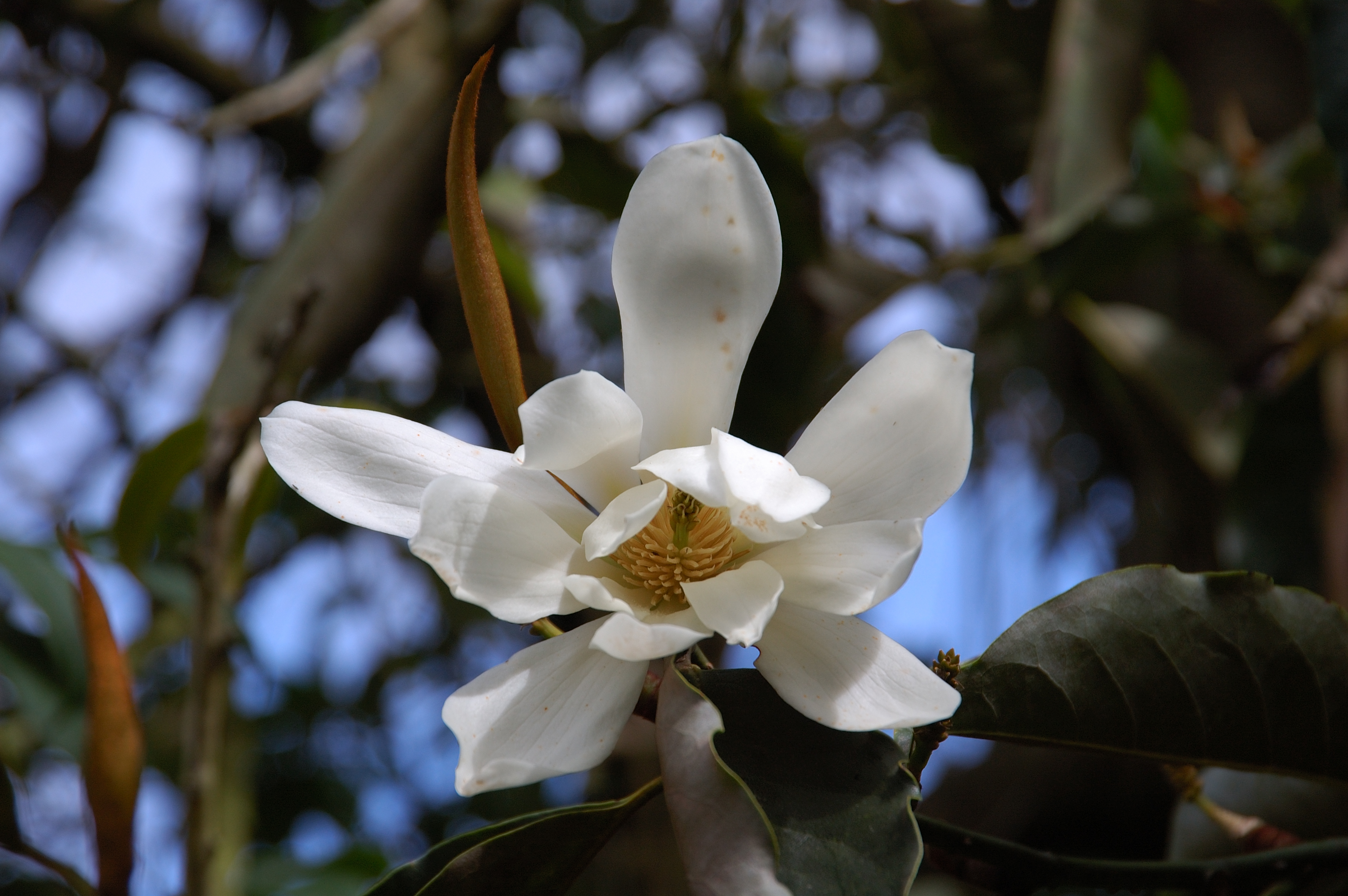

Conservation status
- Data Deficient (IUCN 3.1)

Scientific classification
- Kingdom: Plantae
- Clade: Embryophytes
- Clade: Tracheophytes
- Clade: Spermatophytes
- Clade: Angiosperms
- Clade: Magnoliids
- Order: Magnoliales
- Family: Magnoliaceae
- Genus: Magnolia
- Subgenus: Magnolia subg. Yulania
- Section: Magnolia sect. Michelia
- Subsection: Magnolia subsect. Michelia
- Species: M. doltsopa

Binomial name
- Magnolia doltsopa (Buch.-Ham. ex DC.) Figlar

Synonyms
- Michelia doltsopa Buch.-Ham. ex DC.; Magnolia excelsa (Wall.) Blume; Michelia manipurensis Watt ex Brandis; Michelia wardii Dandy; Michelia calcuttensis P.Parm.; Sampacca excelsa (Wall.) Kuntze

= Magnolia doltsopa =

Species of tree

Magnolia doltsopa is a large shrub or small tree native to the eastern Himalayan region and the Meghalaya subtropical forests in Northeastern India. The wood is fragrant.

== Description ==
The plant varies in form from bushy to narrow and upright, can grow to a height of 30 metres (98 ft) tall. The tree flowers in spring and produces heavily scented white flowers. It has long leathery and glossy dark-green leaves, 6–17 centimetres (2.4–6.7 in) in length, that provide a point of interest all year long. The wood is a rich brown. It grows in evergreen broad-leaved forests.

The "Silver Cloud" variety grows to 15 feet and flowers earlier in its lifespan.

== Cultivation ==
Magnolia doltsopa is used as a featured ornamental tree and street tree, or pruned as a hedge. It enjoys a sheltered position in full or part sun, and appreciates well drained soil. It can tolerate acidic soil.

== Global distribution and use ==
In Nepal, the wood of the Magnolia doltsopa is used for house building. It is also used for house building in Bhutan, where in the 1980s it suffered from over-harvesting.

The Magnolia doltsopa is useful in a Shifting cultivation system, which relies on species with good nitrogen fixation in soil.
