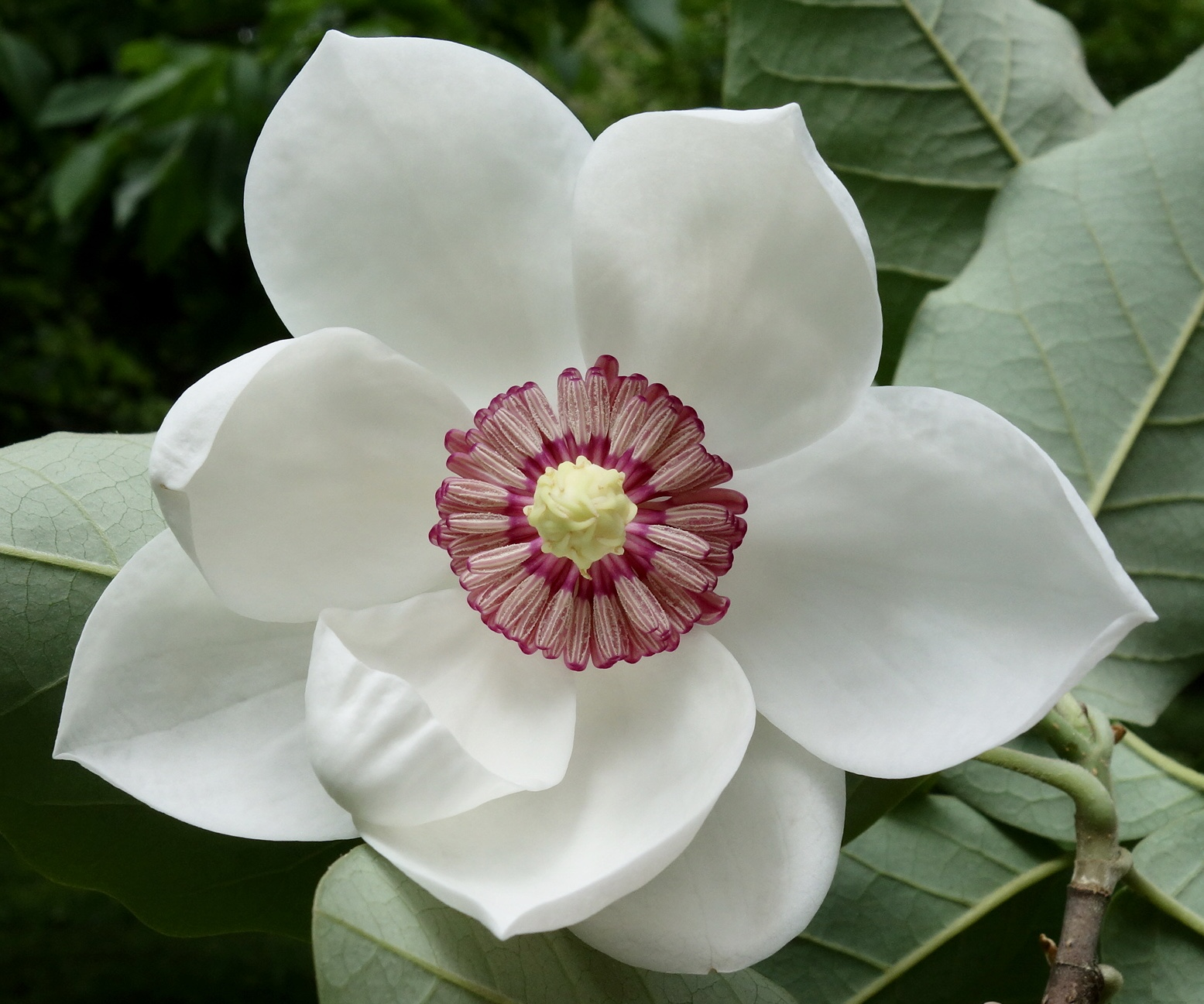
- Magnolia sieboldii

Scientific classification
- Kingdom: Plantae
- Clade: Tracheophytes
- Clade: Angiosperms
- Clade: Magnoliids
- Order: Magnoliales
- Family: Magnoliaceae
- Genus: Magnolia; L.

Type species
- Magnolia virginiana L.

Subgenera
- Magnolia; Yulania; Gynopodium

Diversity
- 210 to 340 species

Synonyms
- List: Alcimandra Dandy; Aromadendron Blume; Blumia Nees ex Blume; Buergeria Siebold & Zucc.; Champaca Adans.; Dugandiodendron Lozano; Elmerrillia Dandy; Guillimia Rchb.; Gwillimia Rottler ex DC.; Houpoea N.H.Xia & C.Y.Wu; Kmeria Dandy; Kobus Kaempf. ex Salisb.; Lassonia Buc'hoz; Lirianthe Spach; Liriopsis Spach; Manglietia Blume; Manglietiastrum Y.W.Law; Metamagnolia Sima & S.G.Lu; Michelia L.; Micheliopsis H.Keng; Oyama (Nakai) N.H.Xia & C.Y.Wu; Pachylarnax Dandy; Parakmeria Hu & W.C.Cheng; Paramagnolia Sima & S.G.Lu; Paramanglietia Hu & W.C.Cheng; Paramichelia Hu; Sampacca Kuntze; Santanderia Cespedes ex Triana & Planch.; Sinomanglietia Z.X.Yu; Sphenocarpus Wall.; Svenhedinia Urb.; Talauma A.Juss.; Tsoongiodendron Chun; Tulipastrum Spach; Woonyoungia Y.W.Law; Yulania Spach

= Magnolia =

Magnolia Temporal range: Campanian to Holocene

Genus of angiosperms

Magnolia is a large genus of about 210 to 340 (Note: The number of species in the genus Magnolia depends on the taxonomic view that one takes. Recent molecular and morphological research shows that former genera Talauma, Dugandiodendron, Manglietia, Michelia, Elmerrillia, Kmeria, Parakmeria, Pachylarnax (and a small number of monospecific genera) all belong within the same genus, Magnolia s.l. (s.l. = sensu lato: 'in a broad sense', as opposed to s.s. = sensu stricto: 'in a narrow sense'). The genus Magnolia s.s. contains about 120 species. See the section Nomenclature and classification in this article.) flowering plant species in the subfamily Magnolioideae of the family Magnoliaceae. The natural range of Magnolia species is disjunct, with a main center in east, west, south and southeast Asia and a secondary center in South America, Central America, the West Indies, and some species in eastern North America.

Magnolias are evergreen or deciduous trees or shrubs known for their large, fragrant, bowl- or star-shaped flowers with numerous spirally arranged reproductive parts, producing cone-like fruits in autumn that open to reveal seeds. The genus Magnolia was first named in 1703 by Charles Plumier, honoring Pierre Magnol, with early taxonomy refined by Linnaeus in the 18th century based on American and later Asian species. Modern molecular phylogenetic studies have revealed complex relationships leading to taxonomic debates about merging related genera like Michelia with Magnolia. Magnolia species are valued horticulturally for their early and showy flowering, used culinarily in various edible forms, employed in traditional medicine for their bioactive compounds like magnolol and honokiol, and harvested for timber, with hybridization enhancing desirable traits.

Magnolia is an ancient genus that dates back to the Cretaceous. Fossilized specimens of M. acuminata have been found dating to 20 million years ago (mya), and fossils of plants identifiably belonging to the Magnoliaceae date to 95 mya. They are theorized to have evolved to encourage pollination by beetles as they existed prior to the evolution of bees. Another aspect of Magnolia considered to represent an ancestral state is that the flower bud is enclosed in a bract rather than in sepals; the perianth parts are undifferentiated and called tepals rather than distinct sepals and petals. Magnolia shares the tepal characteristic with several other flowering plants near the base of the flowering plant lineage, such as Amborella and Nymphaea (as well as with many more recently derived plants, such as Lilium).

Magnolias are culturally significant symbols, serving as official flowers and trees in various regions like Shanghai, Mississippi, Louisiana, North Korea, and Seoul, and are closely associated with the Southern United States. In the arts, magnolias symbolize both beauty and resilience, as seen in the play and film Steel Magnolias, while also evoking the contrasting brutality of lynching in the song "Strange Fruit" and Southern stereotypes in political commentary.

== Description ==
Stereo image
Left frame
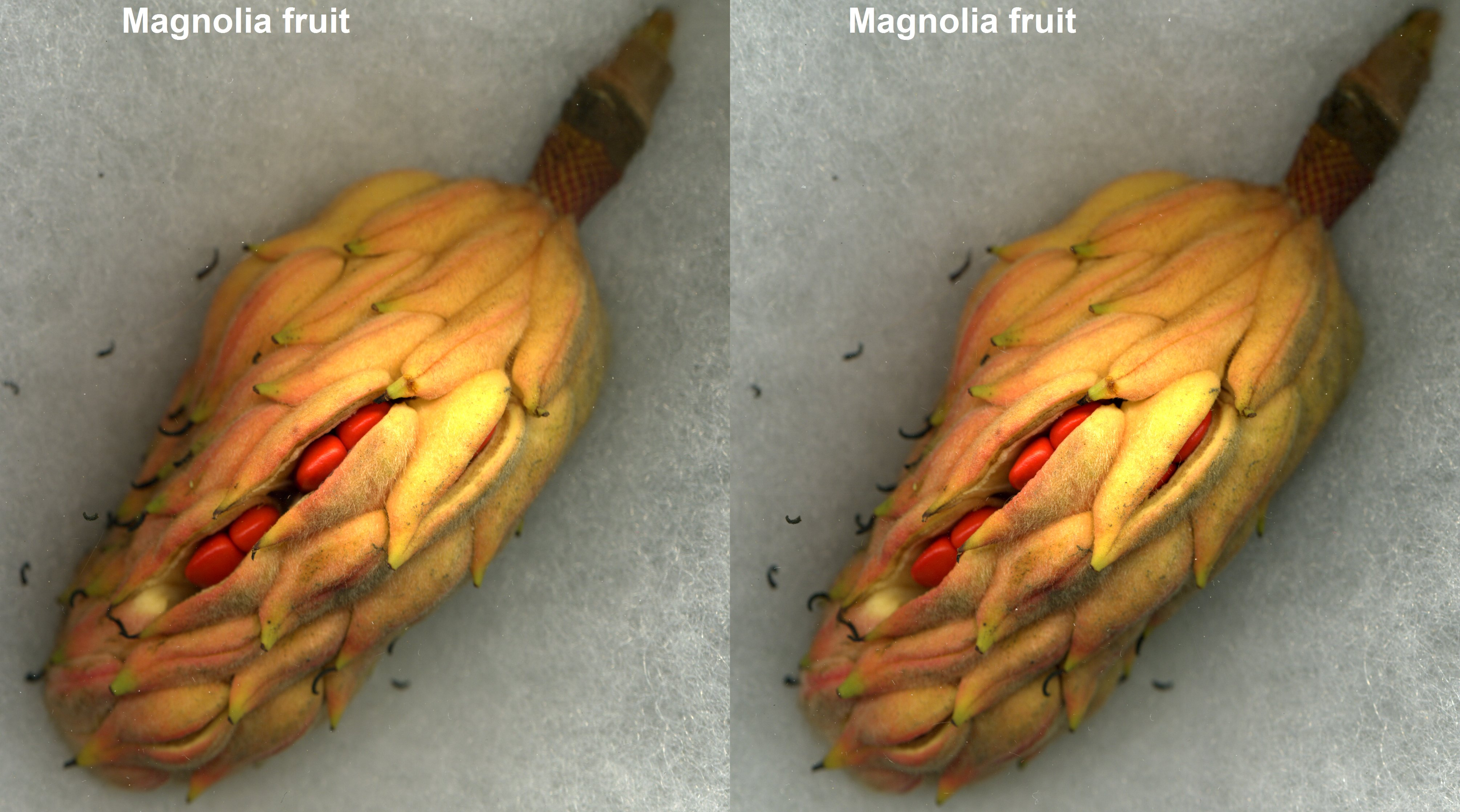
Right frame
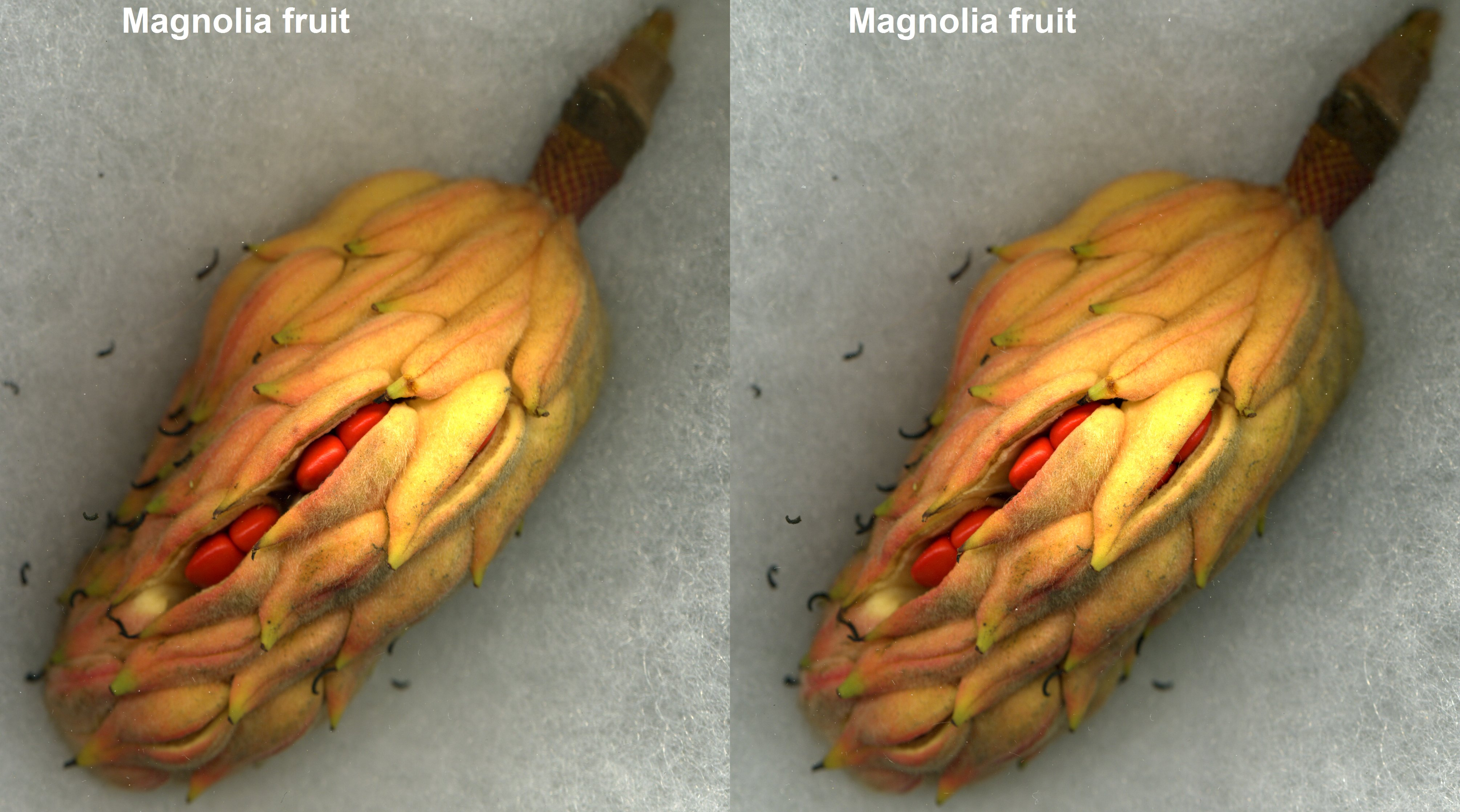
Parallel view
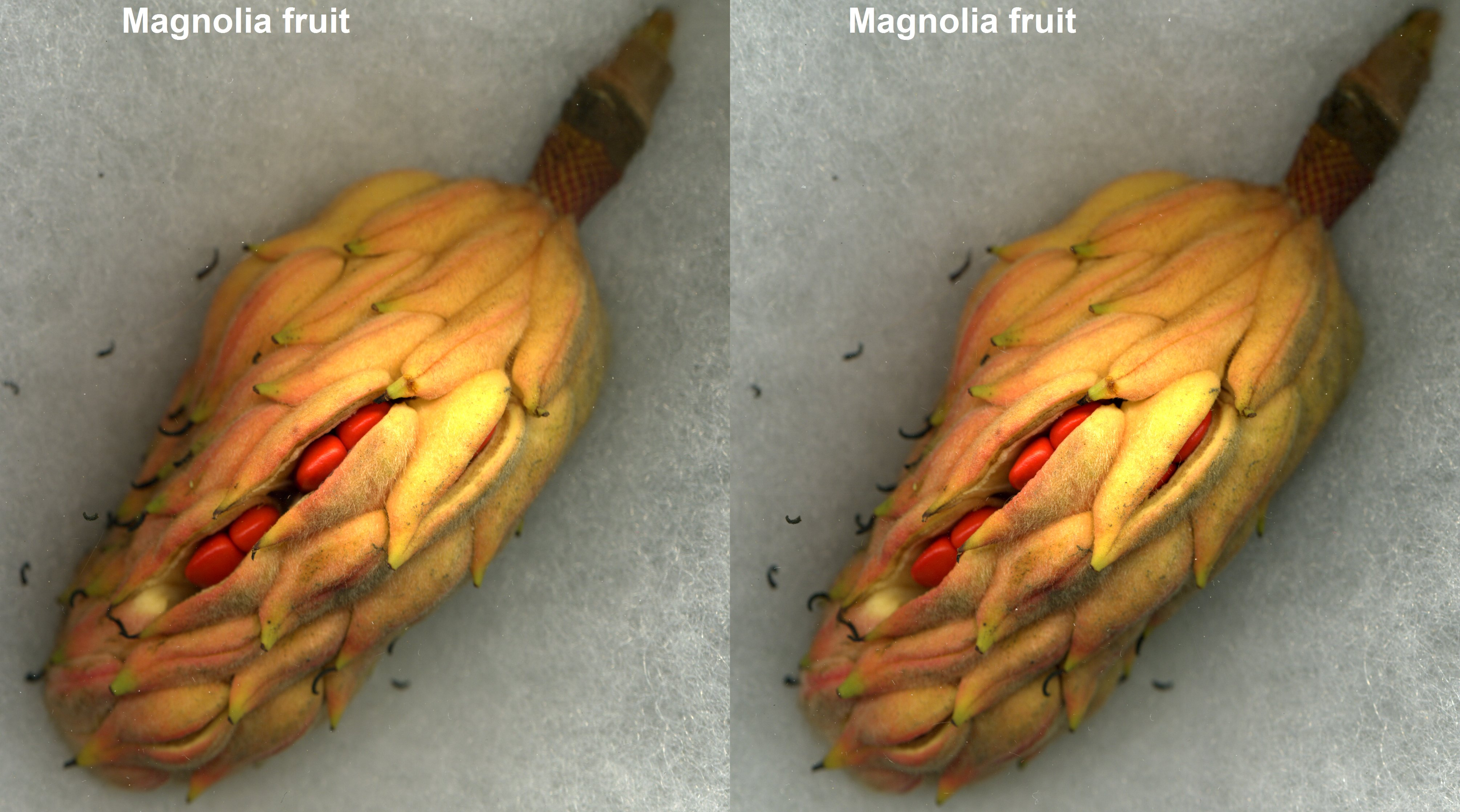
Cross-eye view
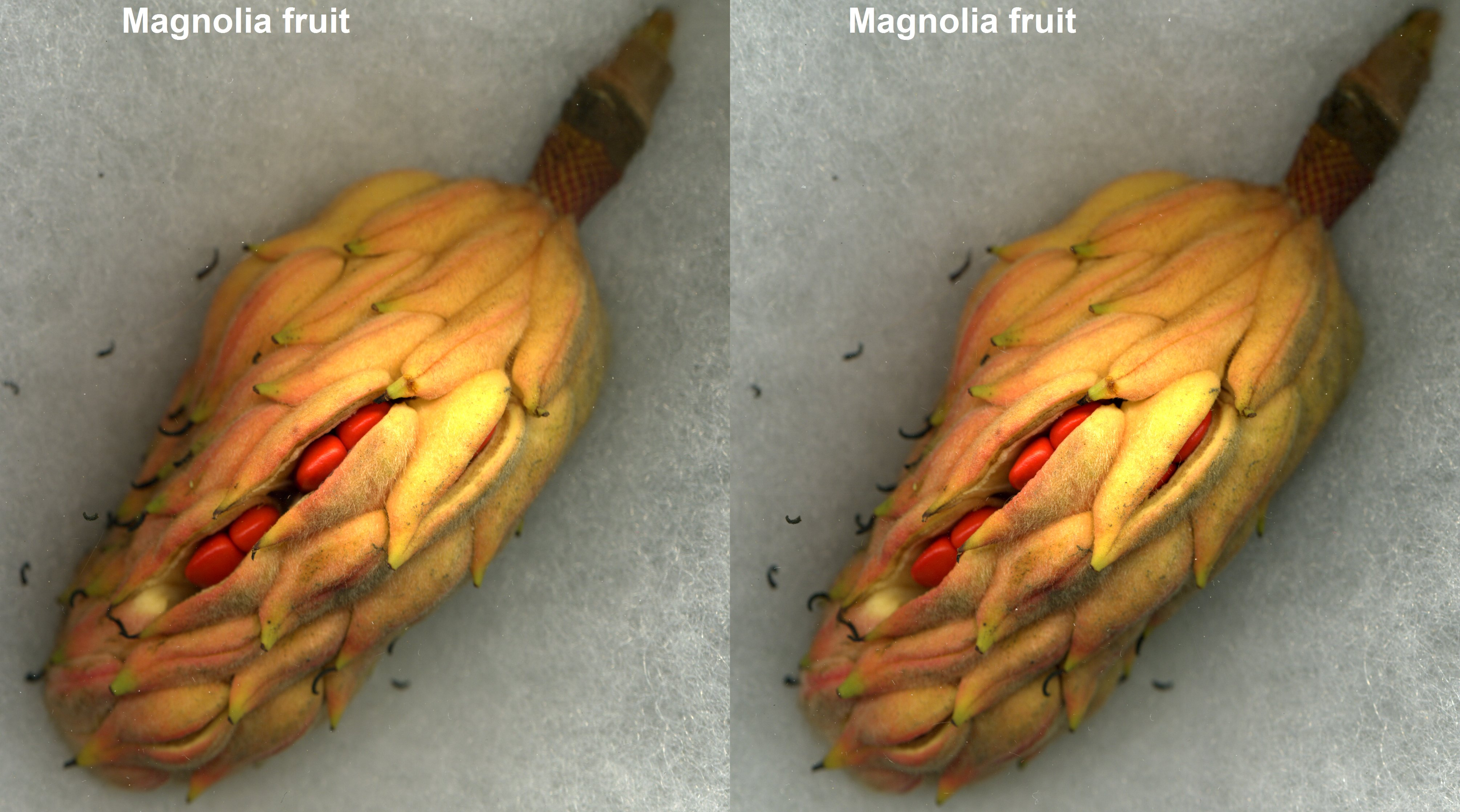

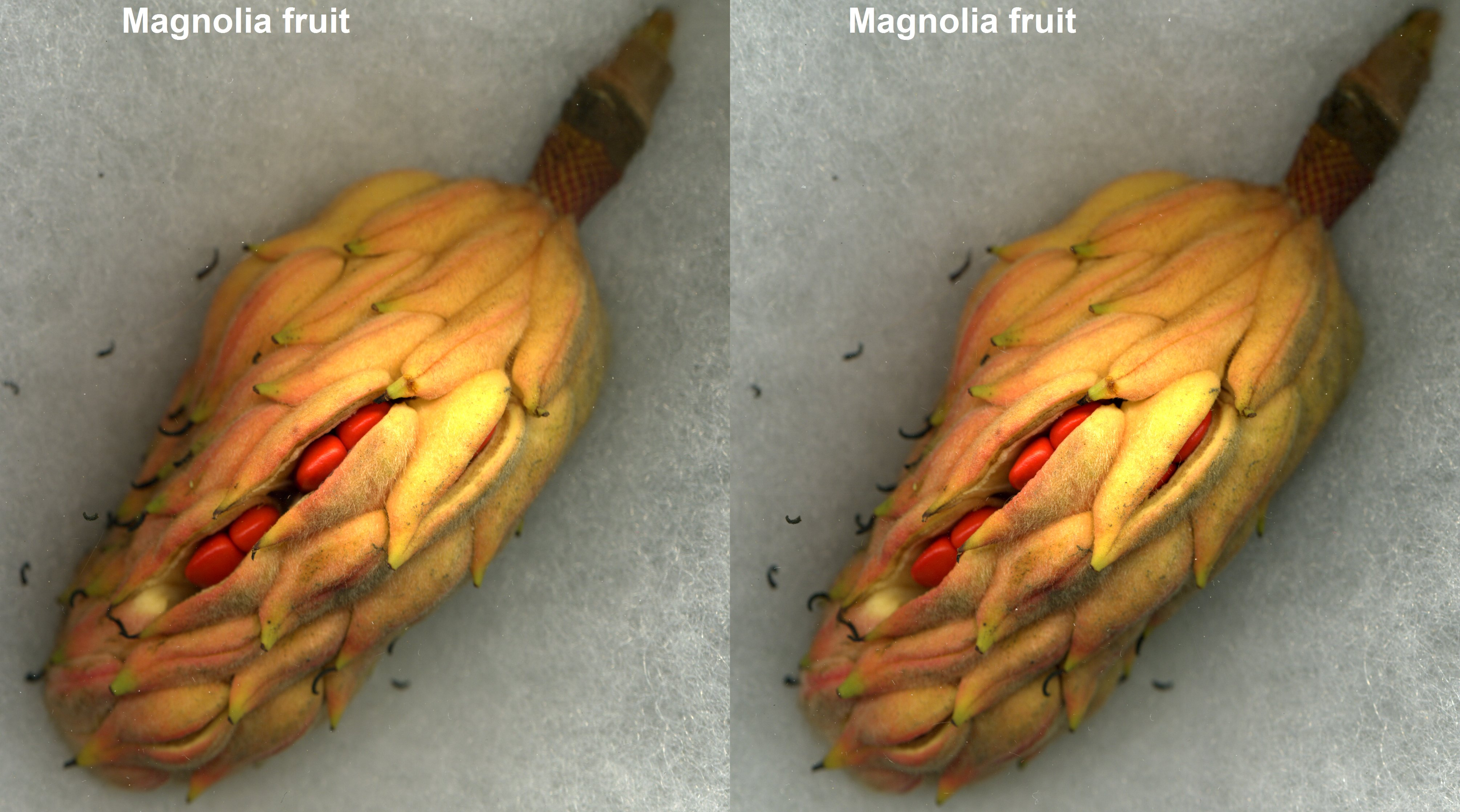
- Mature magnolia fruit just starting to open, with a few seeds visible

An anatomical diagram of the flower of Magnolia biondii

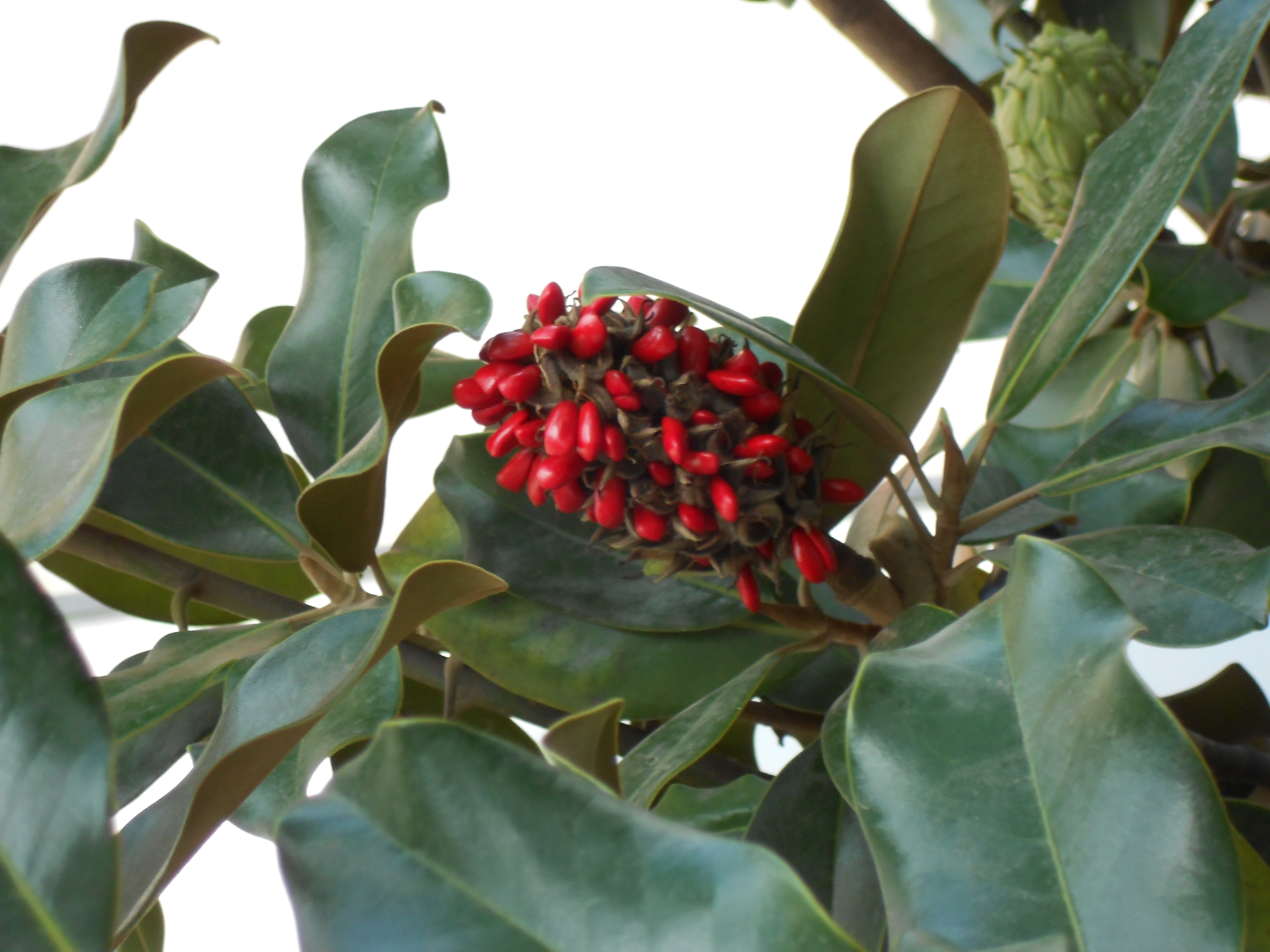
Magnolia seeds and fruit

Magnolias are spreading evergreen or deciduous trees or shrubs characterised by large fragrant flowers, which may be bowl-shaped or star-shaped, in shades of white, pink, purple, green, or yellow. In deciduous species, the blooms often appear before the leaves in spring. Cone-like fruits are often produced in the autumn.

As with all Magnoliaceae, the perianth is undifferentiated, with 9–15 tepals in three or more whorls. The flowers are hermaphroditic, with numerous adnate carpels and stamens arranged in a spiral fashion on the elongated receptacle. The flowers' carpels are often damaged by pollinating beetles.

The fruit dehisces along the dorsal sutures of the carpels. The pollen is monocolpate, and the embryonic development is of the Polygonum type. Taxonomists, including James E. Dandy in 1927, have used differences in the fruits of Magnoliaceae as the basis for classification systems.

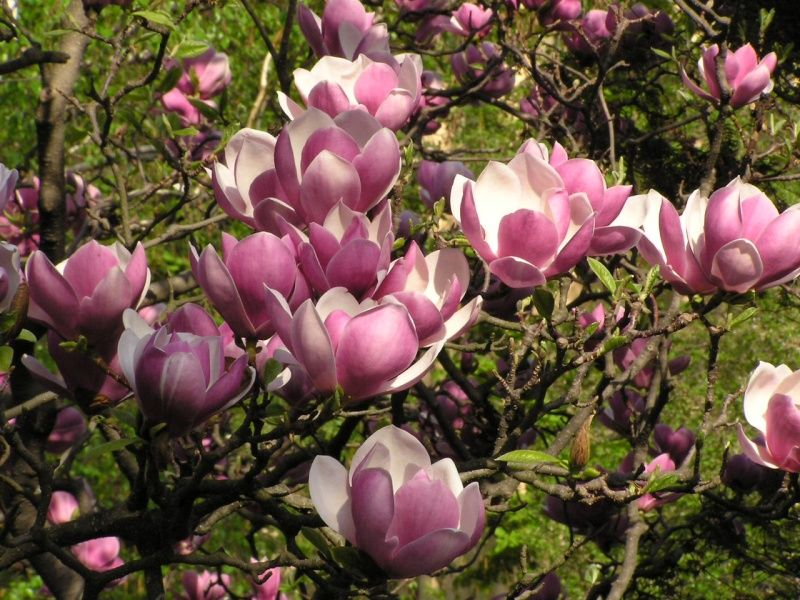
Magnolia × soulangeana

== Taxonomy ==
=== History ===
==== Early ====
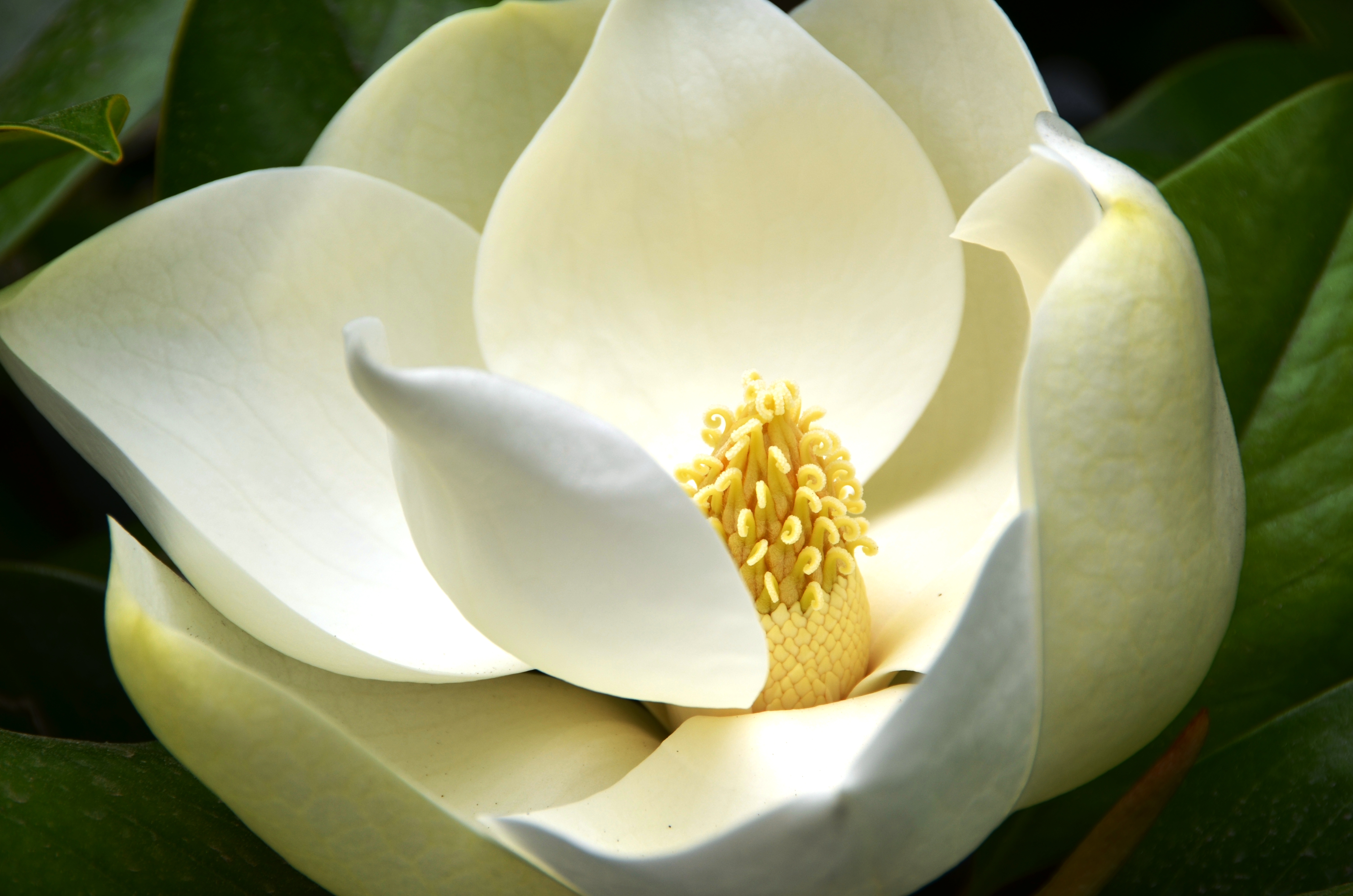
Magnolia grandiflora

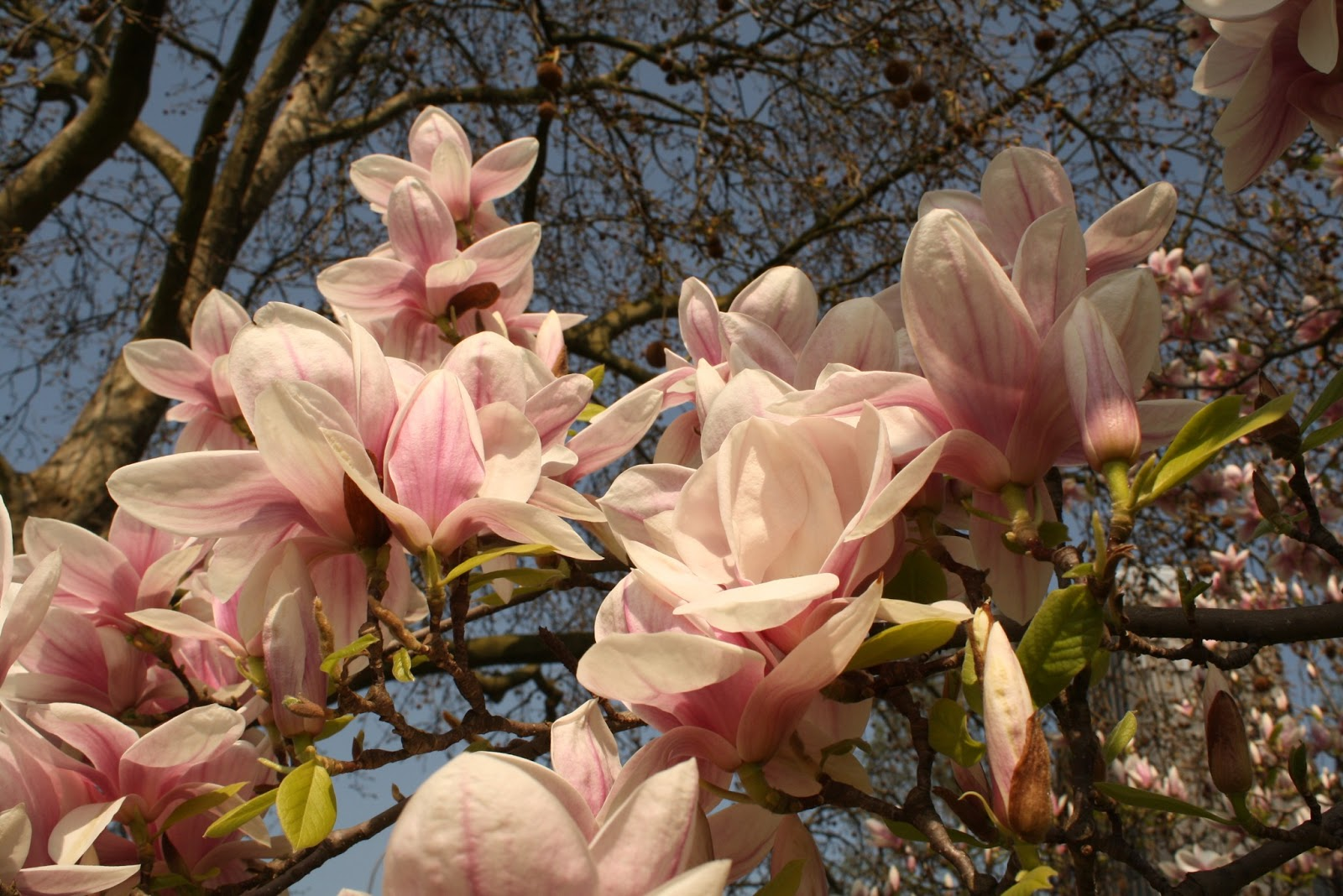
Magnolia flowers

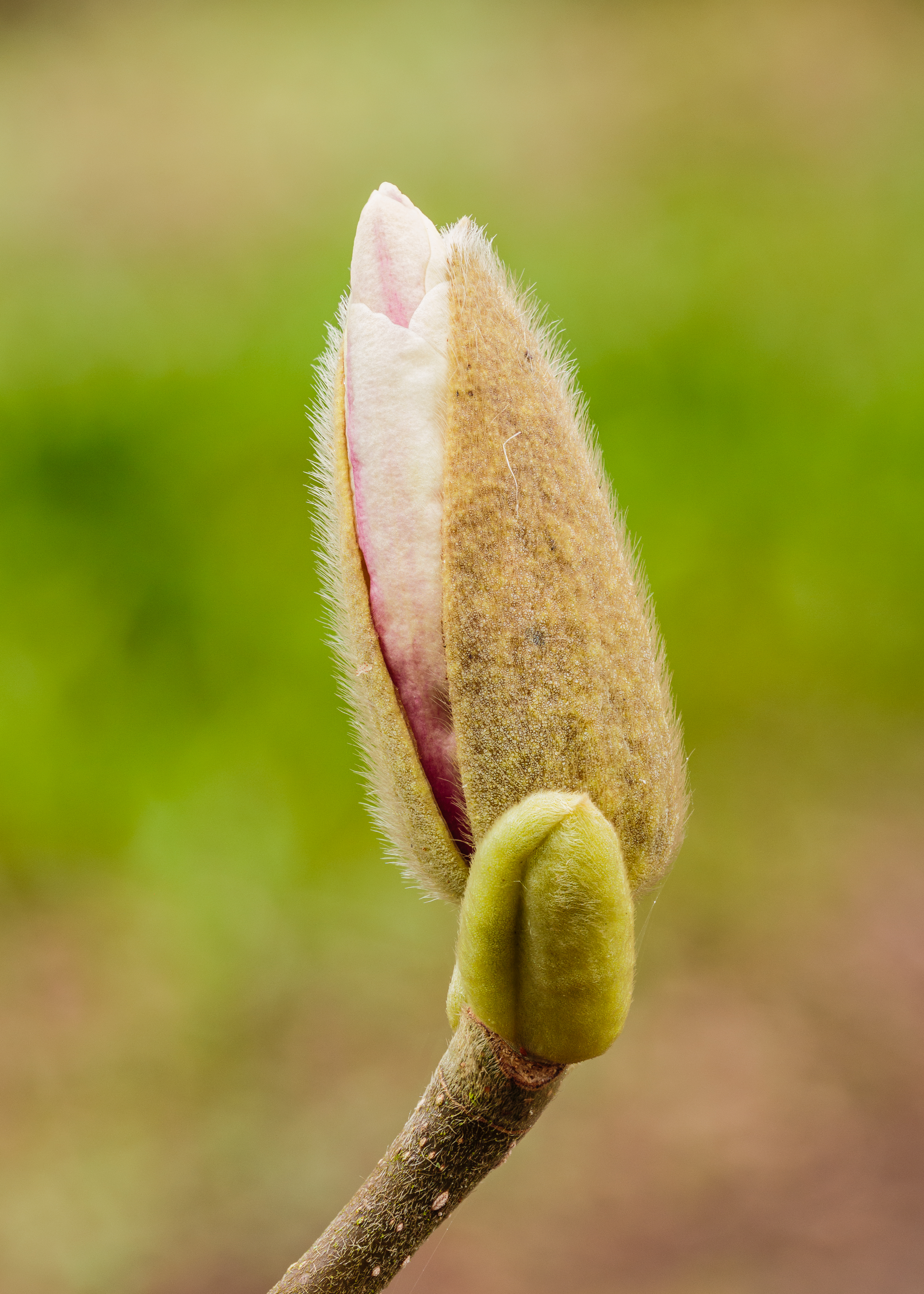
Flower bud

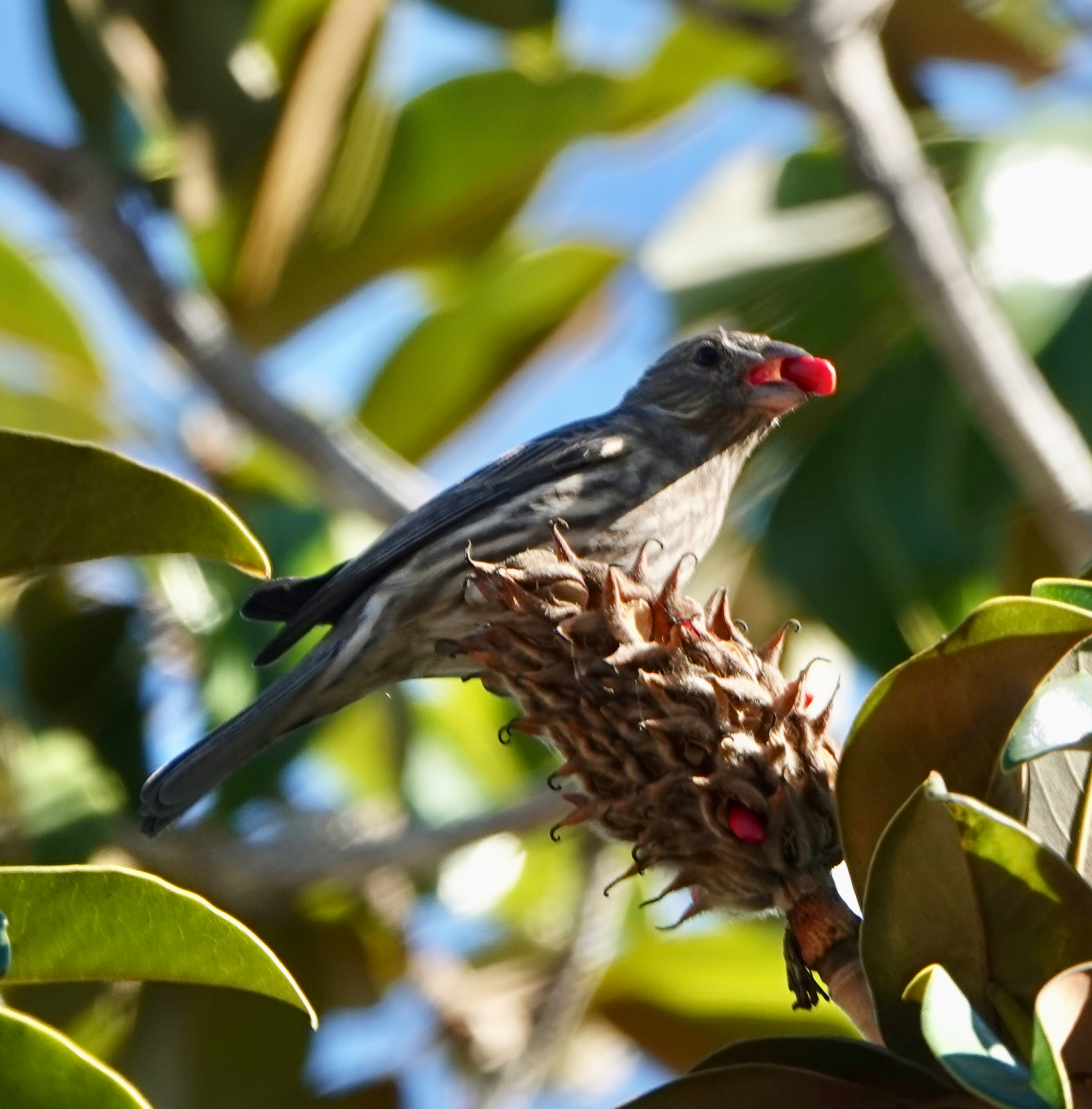
House finch feeding from a magnolia seed pod

The name Magnolia first appeared in 1703 in the Genera written by French botanist Charles Plumier, for a flowering tree from the island of Martinique (talauma). It was named after French botanist Pierre Magnol. English botanist William Sherard, who studied botany in Paris under Joseph Pitton de Tournefort, a pupil of Magnol, was most probably the first after Plumier to adopt the genus name Magnolia. He was at least responsible for the taxonomic part of Johann Jacob Dillenius's Hortus Elthamensis and of Mark Catesby's Natural History of Carolina, Florida and the Bahama Islands. These were the first works after Plumier's Genera that used the name Magnolia, this time for some species of flowering trees from temperate North America. The species that Plumier originally named Magnolia was later described as Annona dodecapetala by Jean-Baptiste Lamarck and has since been named Magnolia plumieri and Talauma plumieri (among a number of other names), but is now known as Magnolia dodecapetala. (Note: Under the rule of priority, the first name that is validly published in Linnaeus' Species Plantarum (1 May 1753) or any other work of any other botanist after that, takes precedence over later names. Plumier's name was not a binomen and moreover published before Species Plantarum, so it has no status. The first binomen published after 1753 was Lamarck's Annona dodecapetala (1786). Magnolia plumieri (1788) was published on a later date by Schwartz, and is treated as a later synonym, as are Magnolia fatiscens (1817; Richard), Talauma caerulea (Jaume St-Hilaire 1805) and Magnolia linguifolia (1822).)

Carl Linnaeus, who was familiar with Plumier's Genera, adopted the genus name Magnolia in 1735 in his first edition of Systema Naturae, without a description but with a reference to Plumier's work. In 1753, he took up Plumier's Magnolia in the first edition of Species Plantarum. He described a monotypic genus, with the sole species being Magnolia virginiana. Since Linnaeus never saw a herbarium specimen (if there ever was one) of Plumier's Magnolia and had only his description and a rather poor picture at hand, he must have taken it for the same plant that was described by Mark Catesby in his 1730 Natural History of Carolina. He placed it in the synonymy of Magnolia virginiana var. fœtida, the taxon now known as Magnolia grandiflora. Under Magnolia virginiana, Linnaeus described five varieties (glauca, fœtida, grisea, tripetala, and acuminata). In the tenth edition of Systema Naturae (1759), he merged grisea with glauca and raised the four remaining varieties to species status. (Note: Magnolia glauca has the same type specimen as Magnolia virginiana and as the latter is the first valid name, the species is now called Magnolia virginiana (sweetbay magnolia). Var. fœtida was renamed Magnolia grandiflora, which is legitimate as the epithet fœtida only has priority in its rank of variety. Magnolia grandiflora is the southern magnolia. Magnolia tripetala (umbrella magnolia) and Magnolia acuminata (cucumber tree) are still recognized as species.)

By the end of the 18th century, botanists and plant hunters exploring Asia had begun to name and describe the Magnolia species from China and Japan. The first Asiatic species to be described by western botanists were Magnolia denudata, Magnolia liliiflora, (Note: Under these names the species were described by Desrousseaux in Lamarck's Encyclopédie Méthodique Botanique, tome troisieme (1792): 675. In the beginning of the 20th century, descriptions which seemed to represent the same species, were found in a work of the French naturalist P.J. Buc'hoz, Plantes nouvellement découvertes (1779), under the names Lassonia heptapeta and Lassonia quinquepeta. In 1934, the English botanist J.E. Dandy argued that these names had priority over the names by which both species had been known for over a century and hence from then on Magnolia denudata had to be named Magnolia heptapeta, Magnolia liliiflora should be changed into Magnolia quinquepeta. After a lengthy debate, specialist taxonomists decided that the Buc'hoz's names were based on chimaeras (pictures constructed of elements of different species), and as Buc'hoz did not cite or preserve herbarium specimens, his names were ruled not to be acceptable.) Magnolia coco, and Magnolia figo. (Note: These species were published as Liriodendron coco and Liriodendron figo by J. de Loureiro in Flora Cochinchinensis (1790) and later (1817) transferred to Magnolia by A. P. de Candolle. Magnolia figo was soon after transferred to the genus Michelia.) Soon after that, in 1794, Carl Peter Thunberg collected and described Magnolia obovata from Japan, and roughly at the same time Magnolia kobus was also first collected.

==== Recent ====
With the number of species increasing, the genus was divided into two subgenera, Magnolia and Yulania. Magnolia contains the American evergreen species M. grandiflora, which is of horticultural importance, especially in the southeastern United States, and M. virginiana, the type species. Yulania contains several deciduous Asiatic species, such as M. denudata and M. kobus, which have become horticulturally important in their own right and as parents in hybrids. Classified in Yulania is also the American deciduous M. acuminata (cucumber tree), which has recently attained greater status as the parent responsible for the yellow flower color.

Relations in the family Magnoliaceae have puzzled taxonomists for a long time. Because the family is quite old and has survived many geological events (such as ice ages, mountain formation, and continental drift), its distribution has become scattered. Some species or groups of species have been isolated for a long time, while others could stay in close contact. To create divisions in the family (or even within the genus Magnolia) solely based upon morphological characters has proven to be a nearly impossible task. (Note: In 1927 J.E. Dandy accepted 10 genera in The genera of Magnoliaceae, Kew Bulletin 1927: 257–264. In 1984 Law Yuh-Wu proposed 15 in A preliminary study on the taxonomy of the family Magnoliaceae, Acta Phytotaxonomica Sinica 22: 89–109; in 2004 even 16, in Magnolias of China. This is not just about grouping some genera together where others do not; authors often choose different boundaries.)

By the end of the 20th century, DNA sequencing had become available as a method of large-scale research on phylogenetic relationships. Several studies, including studies on many species in the family Magnoliaceae, were carried out to investigate relationships. What these studies all revealed was that the genus Michelia and Magnolia subgenus Yulania were far more closely allied to each other than either one of them was to Magnolia subgenus Magnolia. These phylogenetic studies were supported by morphological data.

As nomenclature is supposed to reflect relationships, the situation with the species names in Michelia and Magnolia subgenus Yulania was undesirable. Taxonomically, three choices are available:

1. to join Michelia and Yulania species in a common genus, not being Magnolia (for which the name Michelia has priority);
2. to raise subgenus Yulania to generic rank, leaving Michelia names and subgenus Magnolia names untouched, or;
3. to join Michelia with the genus Magnolia into the genus Magnolia s.l. (a big genus).

Magnolia subgenus Magnolia cannot be renamed because it contains M. virginiana, the type species of the genus and of the family.

Not many Michelia species have so far become horticulturally or economically important, apart from their wood. Both subgenus Magnolia and subgenus Yulania include species of major horticultural importance, and a change of name would be very undesirable for many people, especially in the horticultural branch. In Europe, Magnolia is even more or less a synonym for Yulania, since most of the cultivated species on this continent have Magnolia (Yulania) denudata as one of their parents. Most taxonomists who acknowledge close relations between Yulania and Michelia therefore support the third option and join Michelia with Magnolia.

The same goes, mutatis mutandis, for the (former) genera Talauma and Dugandiodendron, which are then placed in subgenus Magnolia, and genus Manglietia, which could be joined with subgenus Magnolia or may even earn the status of an extra subgenus. Elmerrillia seems to be closely related to Michelia and Yulania, in which case it will most likely be treated in the same way as Michelia is now. The precise nomenclatural status of small or monospecific genera like Kmeria, Parakmeria, Pachylarnax, Manglietiastrum, Aromadendron, Woonyoungia, Alcimandra, Paramichelia, and Tsoongiodendron remains uncertain. Taxonomists who merge Michelia into Magnolia tend to merge these small genera into Magnolia s.l. as well. Botanists do not agree on whether to recognize a big Magnolia or the different small genera. For example, Flora of China offers two choices: a large genus Magnolia, which includes about 300 species and everything in the Magnoliaceae except Liriodendron (tulip tree), or 16 different genera, some of them recently split out or re-recognized, each of which contains up to 50 species. The western co-author favors the big genus Magnolia, whereas the Chinese recognize the different small genera.

New species of Magnolia are still being discovered today. In 2014, researchers discovered Magnolia vargasiana and Magnolia llangantensis in Ecuador’s Cordillera Llanganates, within the Río Zuñac Reserve at 2000 meters elevation. The Río Zuñac Reserve is a privately protected conservation area in Ecuador, managed by the EcoMinga Foundation. This newly identified tree species grows between 11 and 26 meters tall and features sub-orbicular leaves, creamy white petals, and a pollination system involving flea beetles. Found during a vegetation survey, its limited distribution and low population density place it at risk of extinction.

=== Fossil record ===
Fossils go back to the Late Cretaceous. Post K-Pg fossils of Magnolia are known from the Paleogene, for example the species Magnolia nanningensis, named for mummified wood from the Oligocene of Guangxi, China, which has a close affinity to members of the modern section Michelia.

=== Subdivision ===
In 2012, the Magnolia Society published on its website a classification of the genus produced by Richard B. Figlar, based on a 2004 classification by Figlar and Hans Peter Nooteboom. Species of Magnolia were listed under three subgenera, 12 sections, and 13 subsections. Subsequent molecular phylogenetic studies have led to some revisions of this system; for example, the subgenus Magnolia was found not to be monophyletic. A revised classification in 2020, based on a phylogenetic analysis of complete chloroplast genomes, abandoned subgenera and subsections, dividing Magnolia into 15 sections. The relationships among these sections are shown in the following cladogram, as is the paraphyletic status of subgenus Magnolia.

- - Clade I
    - - M. sect. Splendentes
      - M. sect. Talauma
    - M. sect. Gwillimia
  - Clade II
    - Clade A
      - M. sect. Tuliparia
      - M. sect. Macrophylla
    - - Clade B
        - M. sect. Magnolia
        - - - M. sect. Oyama
            - M. sect. Rytidospermum
          - M. sect. Manglietia
      - Clade C
        - M. sect. Kmeria
        - - M. sect. Gynopodium
          - - - M. sect. Tulipastrum
              - M. sect. Yulania
            - - M. sect. Maingola
              - M. sect. Michelia

The table below compares the 2012 and 2020 classifications. (The circumscriptions of the corresponding taxa may not be the same.)

Comparison of two classifications of Magnolia
Figlar (2012)		Wang et al. (2020)
Section	Subsection	Section
Talauma	Dugandiodendron	Splendentes
Talauma	Cubenses	Splendentes
Talauma	Talauma	Talauma
Gwillimia	Gwillimia	Gwillimia
Gwillimia	Blumiana	Gwillimia
Auriculata		Tuliparia
Macrophylla		Macrophylla
Magnolia		Magnolia
Rhytidospermum	Oyama	Oyama
Rhytidospermum	Rhytidospermum	Rytidospermum
Manglietia		Manglietia
Kmeria		Kmeria
Gynopodium		Gynopodium
Manglietiastrum		Gynopodium
Yulania	Yulania	Yulania
Yulania	Tulipastrum	Tulipastrum
Michelia	Maingola	Maingola
Michelia	Aromadendron	Maingola
Michelia	Michelia	Michelia
Michelia	Elmerrillia	Michelia

== Relevance to humans ==
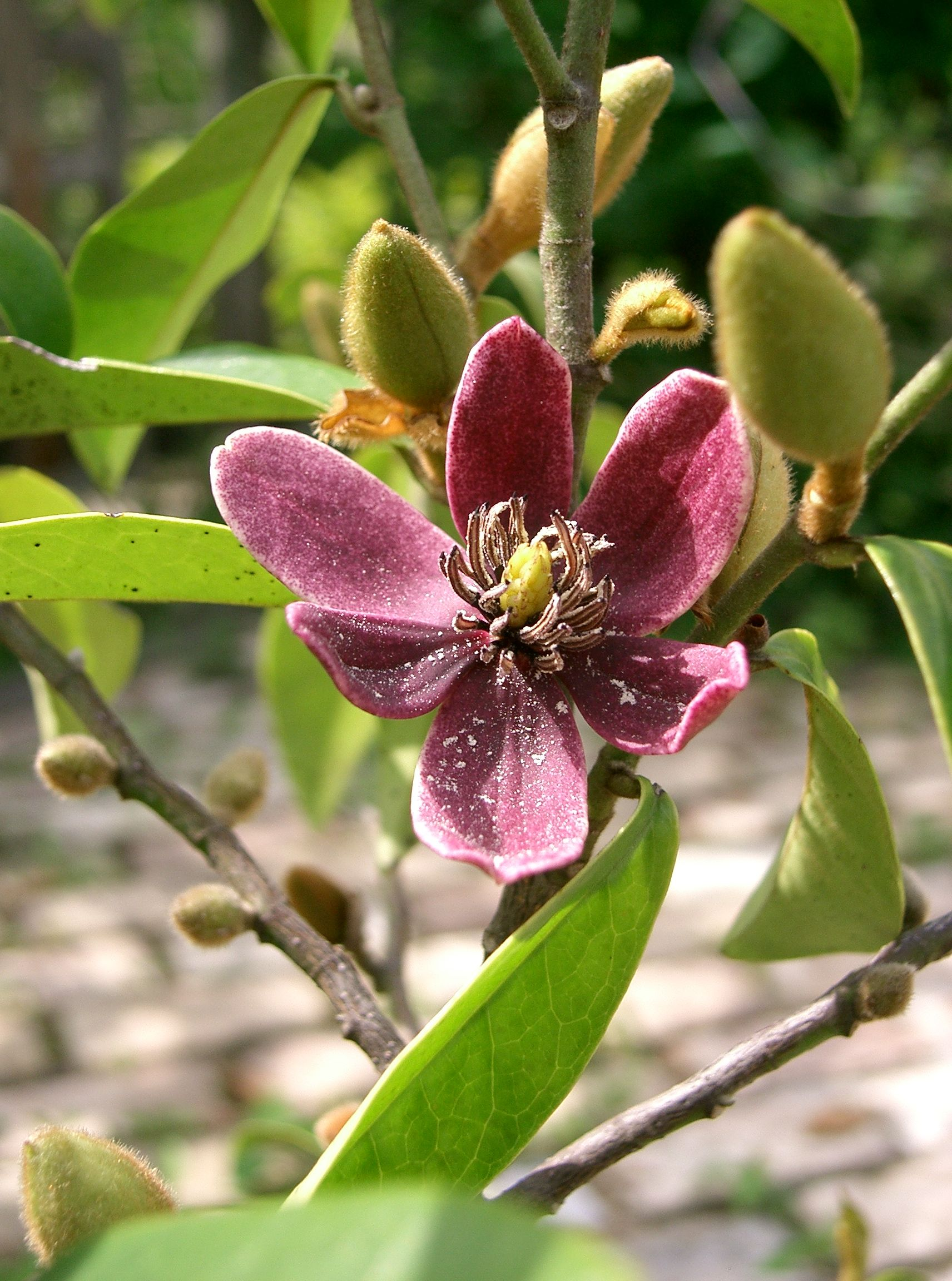
Flowering Magnolia figo 'Purple Queen'

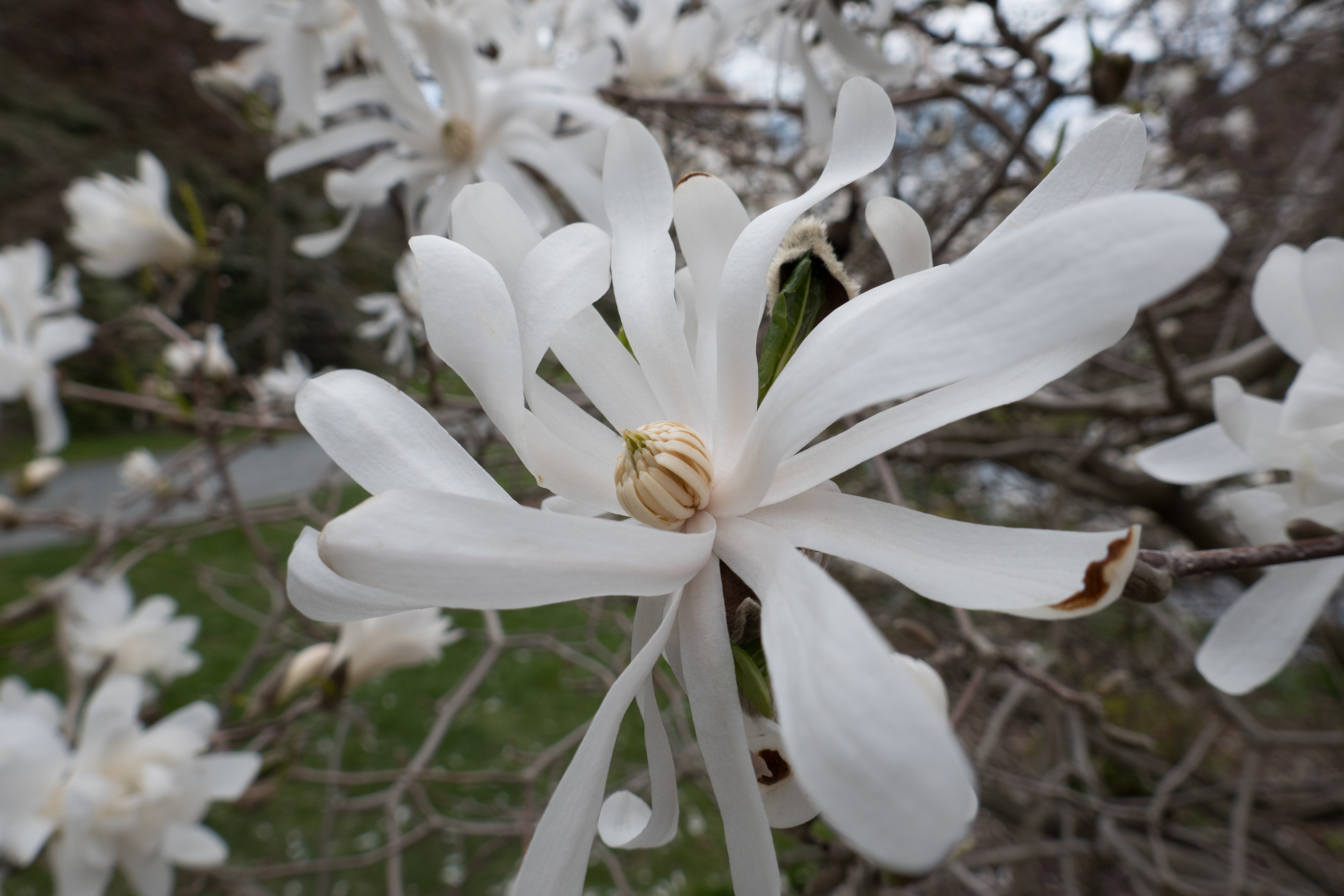
Magnolia stellata or star magnolia of shrub form

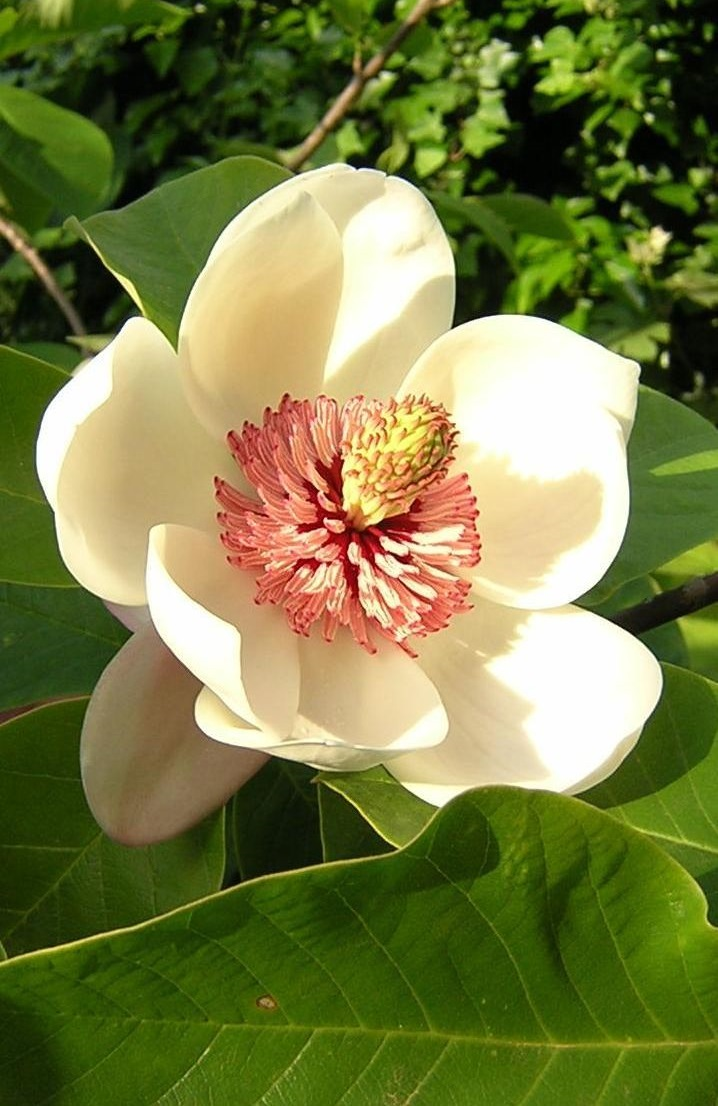
M. × wieseneri hybrid

=== Horticulture ===
In general, the genus Magnolia has attracted horticultural interest. Some, such as the shrub M. stellata (star magnolia) and the tree M. × soulangeana (saucer magnolia) flower quite early in the spring, before the leaves open. Others flower in late spring or early summer, including M. virginiana (sweetbay magnolia) and M. grandiflora (southern magnolia). The shape of these flowers lends itself to the common name tulip tree that is sometimes applied to some Magnolia species. (Note: "Tulip tree" usually refers to Liriodendron tulipifera, but sometimes refers to Magnolia species, especially Magnolia × soulangeana.)

Hybridisation has been immensely successful in combining the best aspects of different species to give plants which flower at an earlier age than the parent species, as well as having more impressive flowers. One of the most popular garden magnolias, M. × soulangeana, is a hybrid of M. liliiflora and M. denudata. In the eastern United States, five native species are frequently in cultivation: M. acuminata (as a shade tree), M. grandiflora, M. virginiana, M. tripetala, and M. macrophylla. The last two species must be planted where high winds are not a frequent problem because of the large size of their leaves. Young plants of the Florida endemic M. ashei start flowering at a particularly early age, even just 3–4 years old, making it popular.

=== Culinary ===
The flowers of many species are considered edible. In some Asian cuisines, the buds are pickled and used to flavor rice and scent tea. In Japan, the young leaves and flower buds of M. hypoleuca are broiled and eaten as a vegetable. Older leaves are made into a powder and used as seasoning; dried, whole leaves are placed on a charcoal brazier and filled with miso, leeks, daikon, and shiitake, and broiled. There is a type of miso which is seasoned with magnolia, hoba miso.

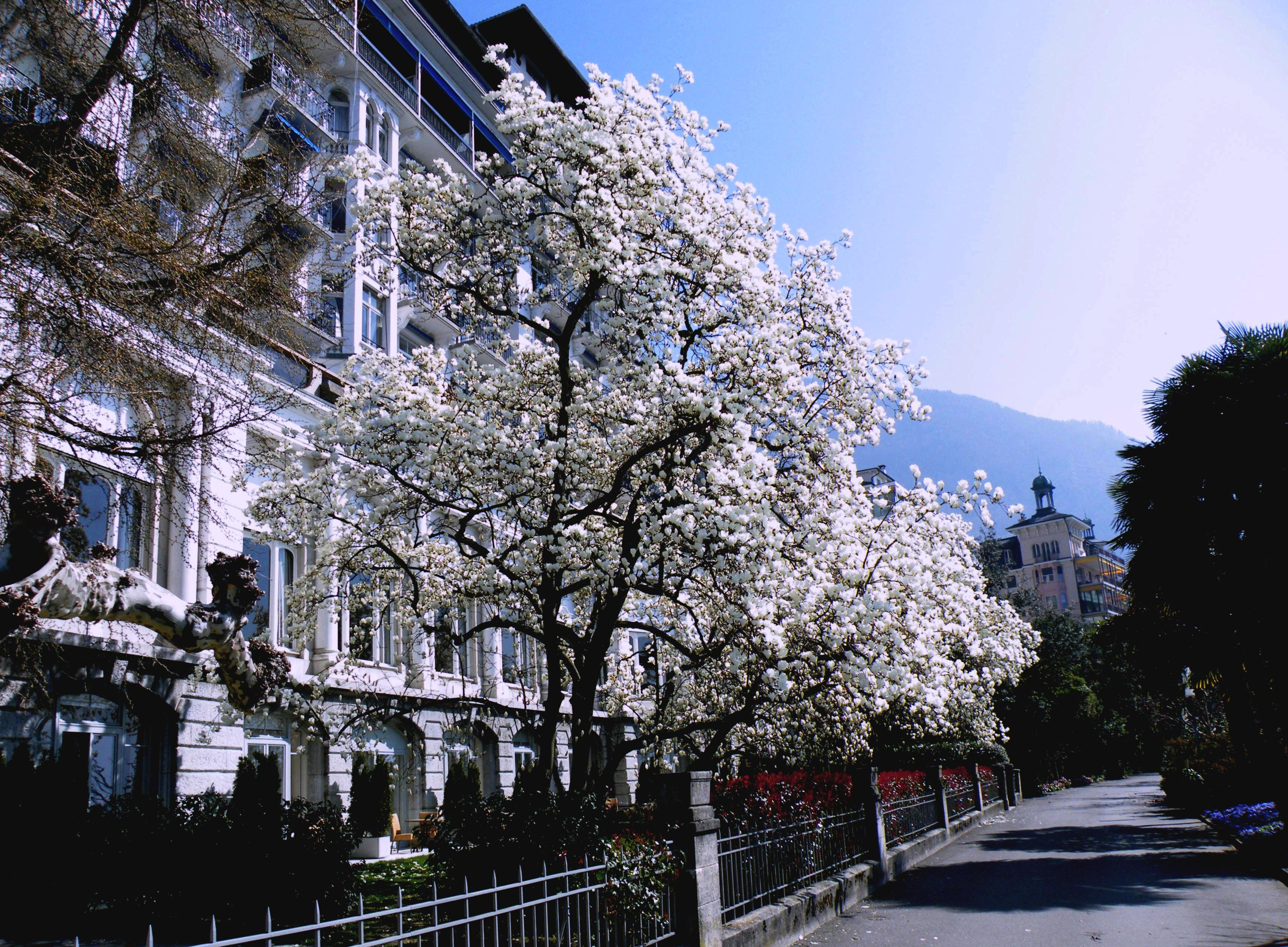
A magnolia tree in a nudiflorum varietal showing full bloom in spring before leaf emergence

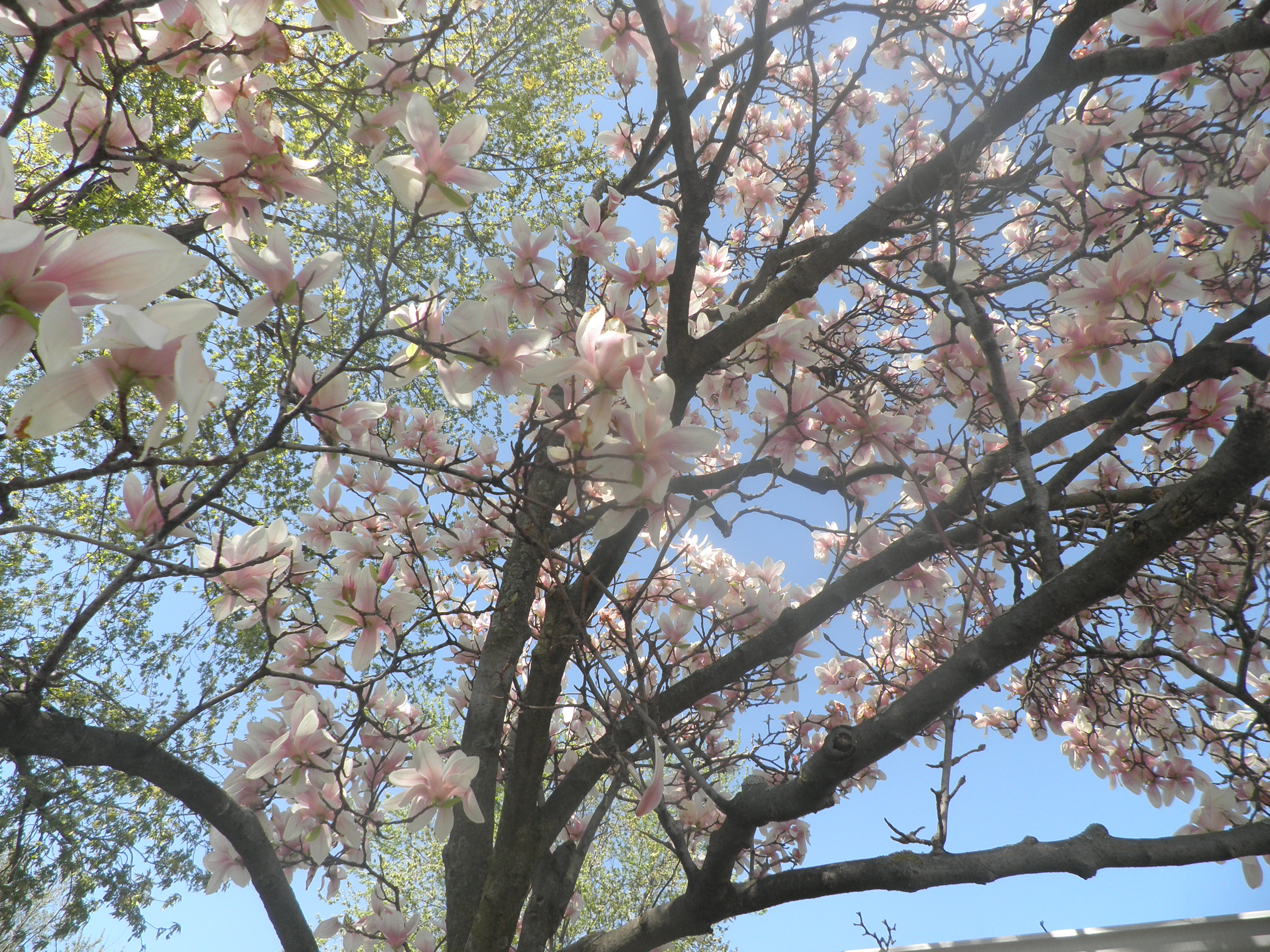
Magnolia tree in bloom

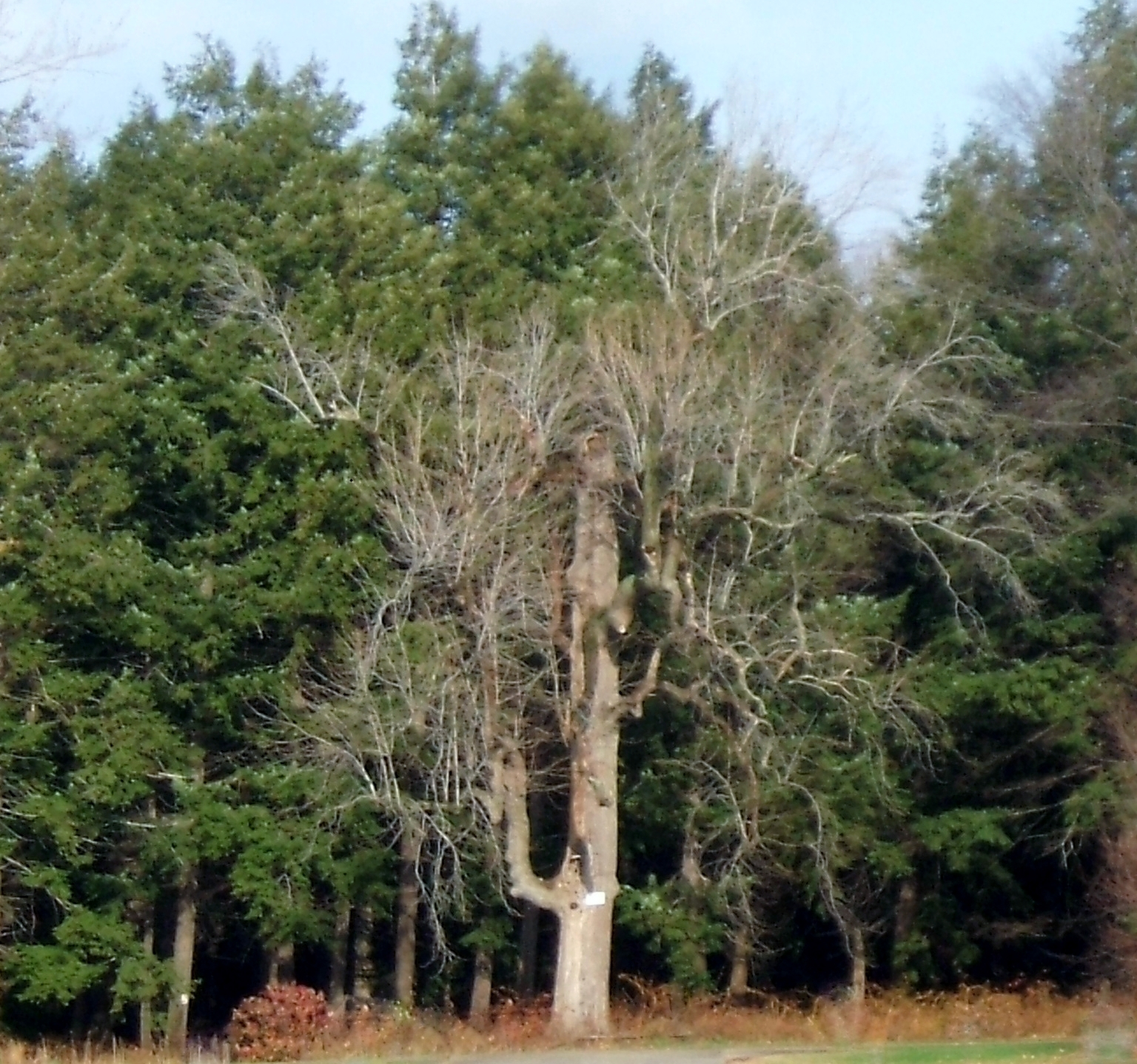
Magnolia tree in autumn

=== Traditional medicine ===
The bark and flower buds of M. officinalis have long been used in traditional Chinese medicine, where they are known as hou po (厚朴). In Japan, kōboku, M. obovata, has been used in a similar manner.

=== Timber ===
The cucumbertree, M. acuminata, grows to large size and is harvested as a timber tree in northeastern U.S. forests. Its wood is sold as "yellow poplar" along with that of the tuliptree, Liriodendron tulipifera. The Fraser magnolia, M. fraseri, also attains enough size sometimes to be harvested, as well.

=== Chemical compounds and bioeffects ===
The aromatic bark contains magnolol, honokiol, 4-O-methylhonokiol, and obovatol. Magnolol and honokiol activate the nuclear receptor peroxisome proliferator-activated receptor gamma.

=== Culture ===
==== Symbols ====
- White or Yulan magnolia (subgenus Yulania) is the official flower of Shanghai.
- According to Paul Standley's Trees and Shrubs of Mexico, magnolia is also called Semiramis tree.
- Magnolia grandiflora is the state flower of both Mississippi and Louisiana. The flower's abundance in Mississippi is reflected in its nickname of "Magnolia State" and the state flag. The magnolia is also the state tree of Mississippi. Historically, magnolias have been associated with the Southern United States.
- Magnolia sieboldii is the national flower of North Korea and the Gangnam District of Seoul.

==== Arts ====
- The 1989 movie Steel Magnolias is based on a 1987 play, Steel Magnolias, by Robert Harling. They are about the bond among a group of women from Louisiana, who can be as beautiful as magnolias, but are as tough as steel. The name 'magnolia' specifically refers to a magnolia tree about which they are arguing at the beginning.
- In the 1939 song "Strange Fruit", originally written as a poem by New York schoolteacher and communist activist Abel Meeropol to condemn the practice of lynching, the magnolia flower was referred to as being associated with the Southern United States, where many lynchings took place:

Pastoral scene of the gallant south
The bulging eyes and the twisted mouth
Scent of magnolias, sweet and fresh,
Then the sudden smell of burning flesh.

Despite Meeropol's frequent mention of the South and magnolia trees, the horrific image which inspired his poem, Lawrence Beitler's 1930 photograph of the lynching of Thomas Shipp and Abram Smith following the robbery and murder of Claude Deteer, was taken in Marion, Indiana, where magnolia trees are less common.

- In the 1960s, magnolias were a symbol of the South in the popular press: the New York Post noted of Lyndon Johnson that "A man who wore a ten-gallon Stetson and spoke with a magnolia accent had little hope of winning the Democratic nomination in 1960", and biographer Robert Caro picks up the symbol by saying that when Johnson became president "[t]he taint of magnolias still remained to be scrubbed off."
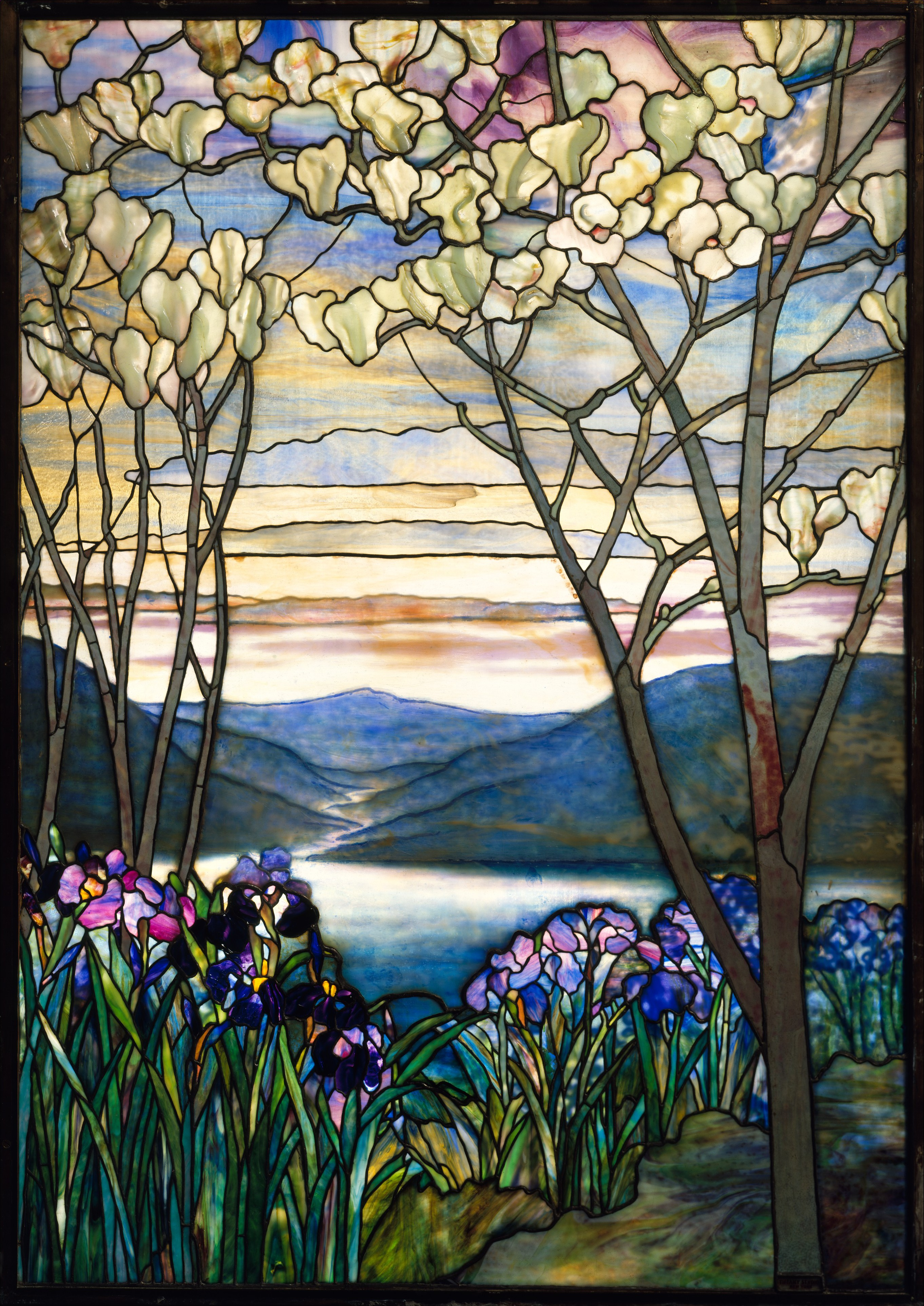
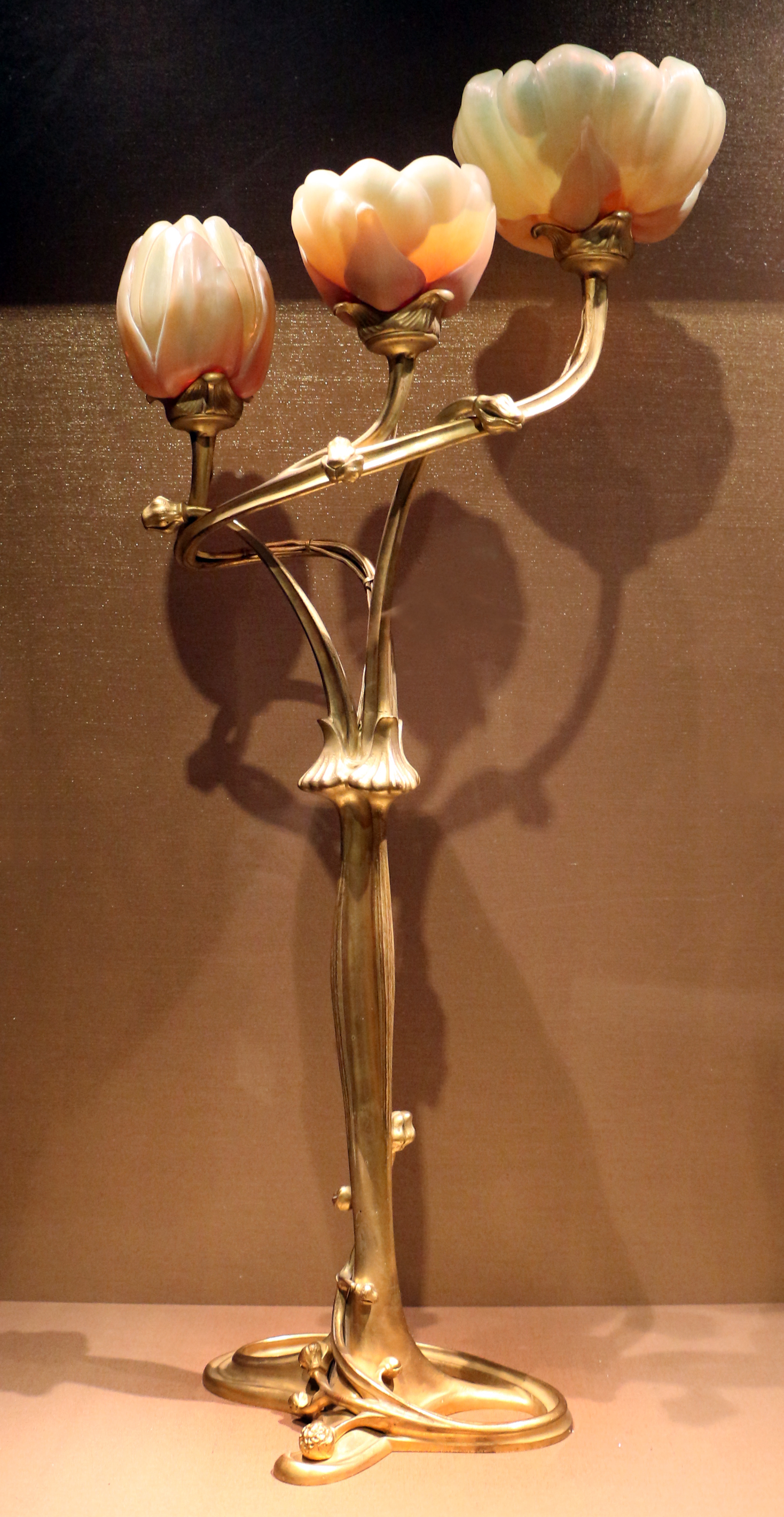
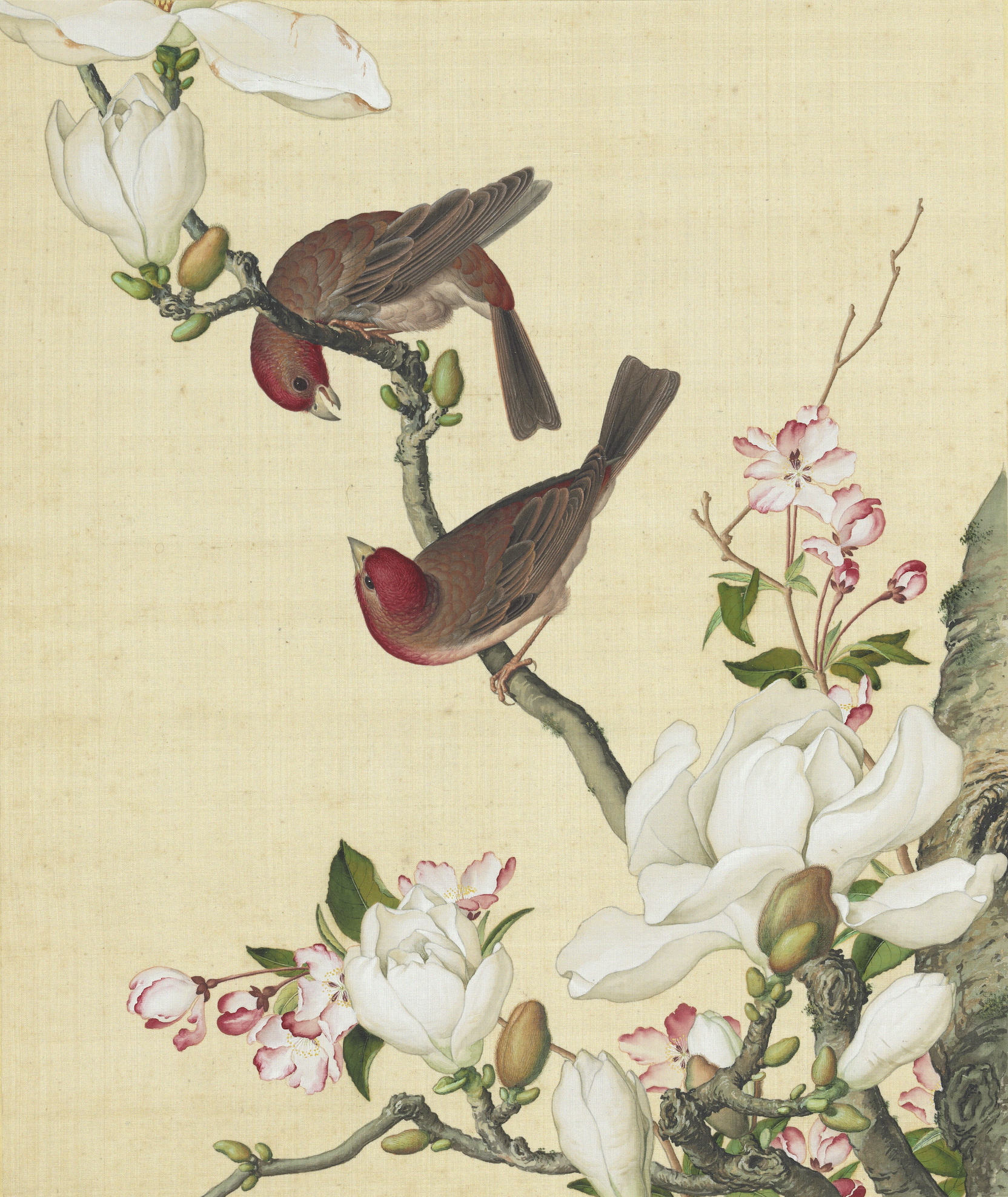
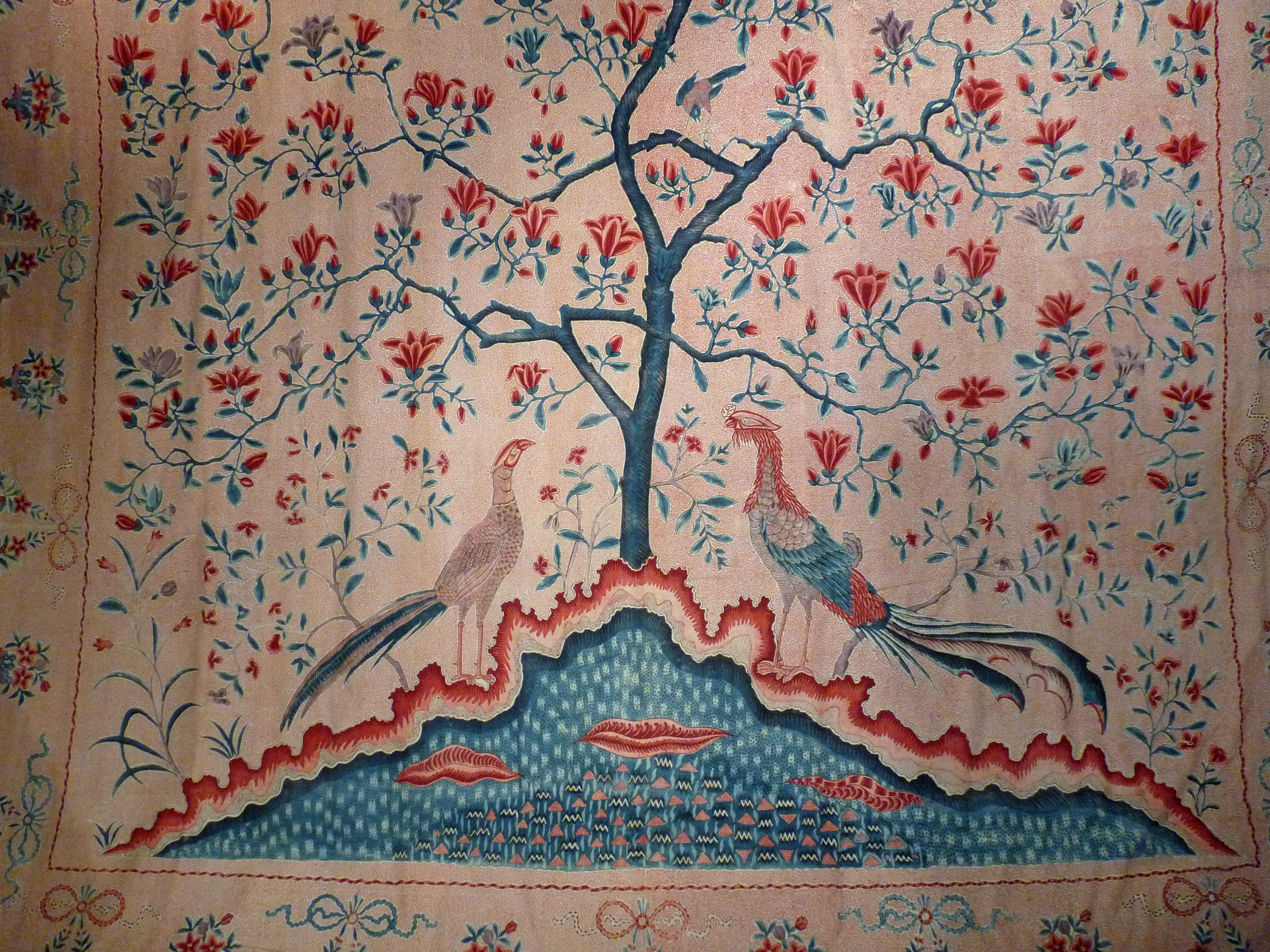
Magnolia in art

== See also ==
- List of AGM magnolias
