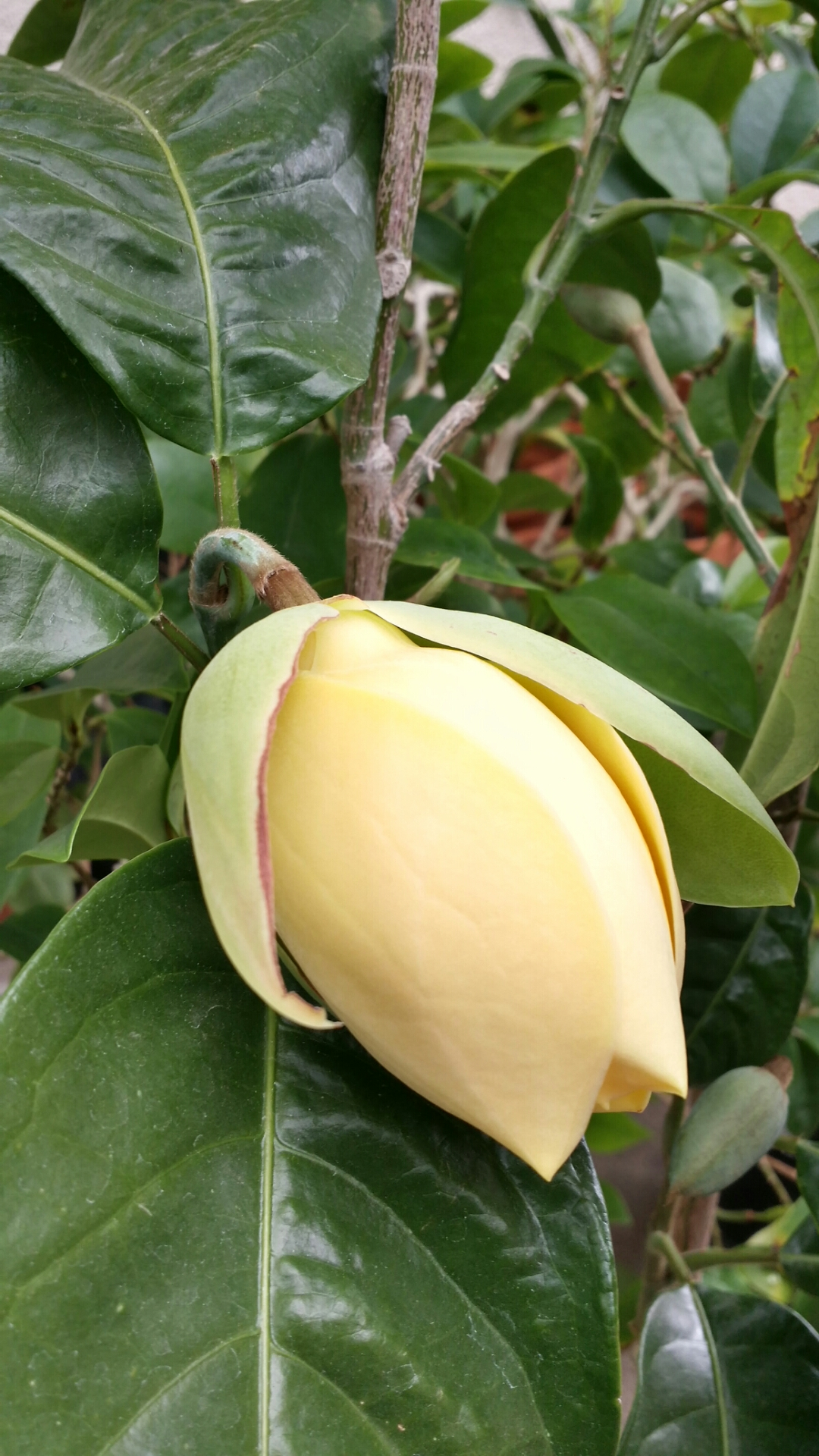
- The typical cream-colored flower of Magnolia liliifera

Conservation status
- Least Concern (IUCN 3.1)

Scientific classification
- Kingdom: Plantae
- Clade: Embryophytes
- Clade: Tracheophytes
- Clade: Spermatophytes
- Clade: Angiosperms
- Clade: Magnoliids
- Order: Magnoliales
- Family: Magnoliaceae
- Genus: Magnolia
- Subgenus: Magnolia subg. Magnolia
- Section: Magnolia sect. Gwillimia
- Subsection: Magnolia subsect. Blumiana
- Species: M. liliifera

Binomial name
- Magnolia liliifera (L.) Baill.

Synonyms
- Aromadendron oreadum (Diels) Kaneh. & Hatus.; Blumia candollei Nees nom. inval.; Liriodendron liliiferum L.; Magnolia andamanica (King) D.C.S.Raju & M.P.Nayar; Magnolia andamanica King nom. inval.; Magnolia candollei (Blume) H.Keng nom. illeg.; Magnolia craibiana Dandy; Magnolia forbesii King nom. inval.; Magnolia kunstleri King nom. inval.; Magnolia mutabilis (Blume) H.J.Chowdhery & P.Daniel; Magnolia odoratissima Reinw. ex Blume nom. inval.; Magnolia pachyphylla Dandy; Magnolia poilanei (Dandy ex Humbert) Callaway nom. inval.; Magnolia pulgarensis Dandy; Magnolia pumila Andrews; Magnolia rumphii (Blume) Spreng.; Magnolia splendens Reinw. ex Blume nom. inval.; Magnolia thamnodes Dandy; Manglietia celebica Miq.; Manglietia sebassa King; Manglietia thamnodes (Dandy) Gagnep.; Talauma andamanica King; Talauma athliantha Dandy; Talauma borneensis Merr.; Talauma candollei Blume; Talauma celebica Koord.; Talauma forbesii King; Talauma gitingensis Elmer; Talauma gracilior Dandy; Talauma inflata P.Parm.; Talauma javanica P.Parm.; Talauma kunstleri King; Talauma liliifera (L.) Kuntze; Talauma liliifera (L.) Kurz; Talauma longifolia (Blume) Ridl.; Talauma macrophylla Blume ex Miq.; Talauma miqueliana Dandy; Talauma mutabilis Blume; Talauma nhatrangensis Dandy; Talauma oreadum Diels; Talauma pulgarensis Elmer; Talauma pumila (Andrews) Blume; Talauma reticulata Merr.; Talauma rubra Miq.; Talauma rumphii Blume; Talauma sebassa (King) Miq. ex Dandy; Talauma soembensis Dandy; Talauma sumatrana A.Agostini; Talauma thamnodes (Dandy) Tiep; Talauma undulatifolia A.Agostini

= Magnolia liliifera =

Species of tree

Magnolia liliifera, commonly known as egg magnolia, is a flowering tree native to the Indomalayan realm. It bears white to cream-colored flowers on terminal stems. The leaves are elliptical and get as large as 25 cm (10 in) long and 8 cm (3 in) wide. The tree ranges in height from 3.5 to 18.5 m (12 to 60 ft) in situ.

== Varieties ==
Magnolia liliifera was classified as having several varieties, however these have now been generally accepted as species by several botanists including Hans Peter Nooteboom and Richard B. Figlar according to data compiled by Rafaël Govaerts, a researcher for the WCSP at Kew Gardens.

- Magnolia liliifera var. angatensis (Blanco) Noot, also accepted as Magnolia angatensis Blanco
- Magnolia liliifera var. beccarii (Ridley) Noot., also accepted as Magnolia beccarii (Ridl.) ined.
- Magnolia liliifera var. championii, (Benth.) Pamp also accepted as Magnolia championii Benth..
- Magnolia liliifera var. obovata (Korth.), also accepted as Magnolia hodgsonii (Hook.f. & Thom.) H.Keng (Note: Magnolia obovata is used for a distantly related species from a different section of Magnolia.)
- Magnolia liliifera var. singapurensis (Ridl.) Govaerts, also accepted as Magnolia singapurensis (Ridl.) H.Keng

== Cultivation ==
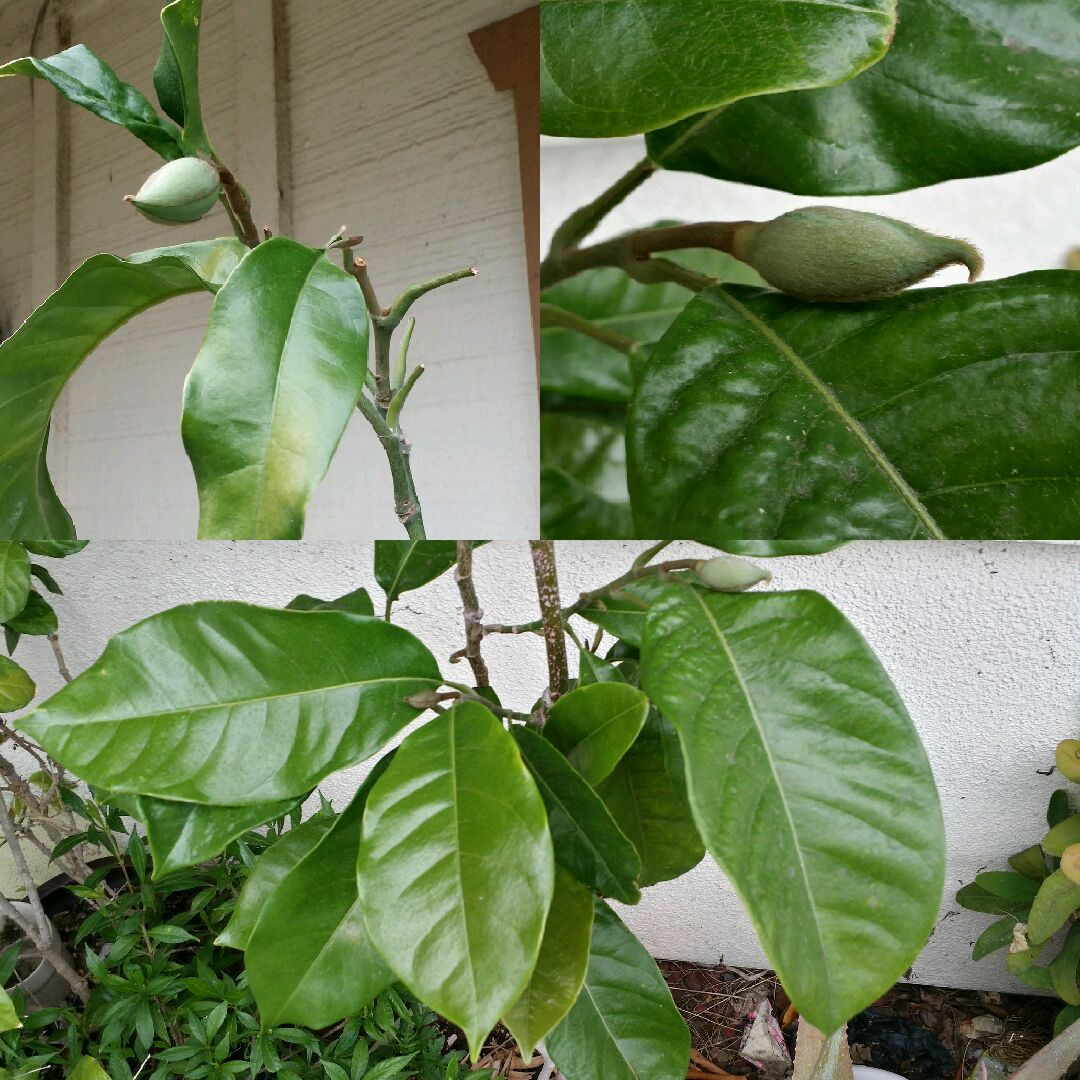
Magnolia liliifera foliage and flower buds in cultivation.

Magnolia liliifera is grown as an ornamental plant and is suited to culture in pots. Although tropical, the egg magnolia is reported to withstand sub-tropical climates at USDA zone 10 and higher. It has been grown in the West since the Victorian era with the first report of a flowering specimen at Kew Gardens in April, 1862. The egg magnolia is valued for its fragrant, egg-like flower which releases a wafting pineapple-like scent in the morning.

== See also ==
- Magnolia hodgsonii
- Talauma
