= Binomial nomenclature =

Species naming system

Orcinus orca, the orca or the killer whale

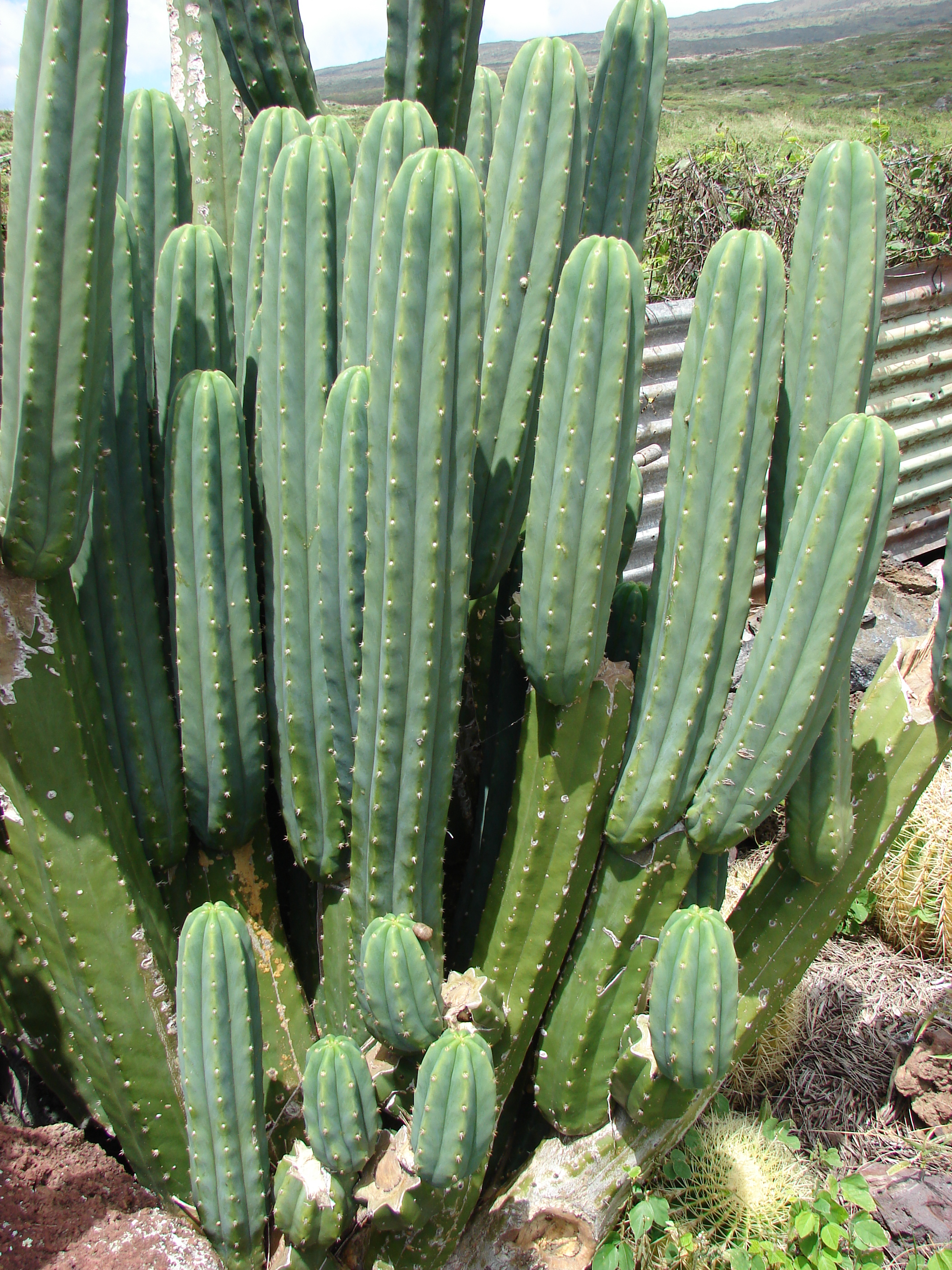
Echinopsis pachanoi, the San Pedro cactus

In taxonomy, binomial nomenclature ("two-term naming system"), also called binary nomenclature, is a formal system of naming species of living things by giving each a name composed of two parts, both of which use Latin grammatical forms, although they can be based on words from other languages. Such a name is called a binomial name (often shortened to just "binomial"), a binomen, binominal name, or a scientific name; more informally, it is also called a Latin name. In the International Code of Zoological Nomenclature (ICZN), the system is also called binominal nomenclature, with an "n" before the "al" in "binominal", which is not a typographic error, meaning "two-name naming system".

The first part of the name – the generic name – identifies the genus to which the species belongs, whereas the second part – the specific name or specific epithet – distinguishes the species within the genus. For example, modern humans belong to the genus Homo and within this genus to the species Homo sapiens. The formal introduction of this system of naming species is credited to Carl Linnaeus, effectively beginning with his work Species Plantarum in 1753. But as early as 1622, Gaspard Bauhin introduced in his book Pinax theatri botanici (English, Illustrated Exposition of Plants) containing many names of genera that were later adopted by Linnaeus. Binomial nomenclature was introduced in order to provide succinct, relatively stable and verifiable names that could be used and understood internationally, unlike common names which are usually different in every language.

The application of binomial nomenclature is now governed by various internationally agreed codes of rules, of which the two most important are the International Code of Zoological Nomenclature (ICZN) for animals and the International Code of Nomenclature for algae, fungi, and plants (ICNafp or ICN). Although the general principles underlying binomial nomenclature are common to these two codes, there are some differences in the terminology they use and their particular rules.

In modern usage, the first letter of the generic name is always capitalized in writing, while that of the specific epithet is not, even when derived from a proper noun such as the name of a person or place. Similarly, both parts are italicized in normal text (or underlined in handwriting). Thus the binomial name of the annual phlox (named after botanist Thomas Drummond) is now written as Phlox drummondii. Often, after a species name is introduced in a text, the generic name is abbreviated to the first letter in subsequent mentions (e.g., P. drummondii).

In scientific works, the authority for a binomial name is usually given, at least when it is first mentioned, and the year of publication may also be specified.

- In zoology
  - "Patella vulgata Linnaeus, 1753". The name "Linnaeus" tells the reader who published the name, and description for this species; 1753 is the year the name and original description were published (in this case, in the 10th edition of the book Systema Naturae).
  - "Passer domesticus (Linnaeus, 1758)". The original name given by Linnaeus was Fringilla domestica; the parentheses indicate that the species is now placed in a different genus. The ICZN does not require that the name of the person who changed the genus be given, nor the date on which the change was made, although nomenclatorial catalogs usually include such information.
- In botany
  - "Amaranthus retroflexus L." – "L." is the standard abbreviation used for "Linnaeus".
  - "Hyacinthoides italica (L.) Rothm." – Linnaeus first named this bluebell species Scilla italica; Rothmaler transferred it to the genus Hyacinthoides; the ICNafp does not require that the dates of either publication be specified.

== Etymology ==
The word binomial is composed of two elements: bi- (Latin prefix meaning 'two') and nomial (the adjective form of nomen, Latin for 'name'). In Medieval Latin, the related word binomium was used to signify one term in a binomial expression in mathematics. In fact, the Latin word binomium may validly refer to either of the epithets in the binomial name, which can equally be referred to as a binomen (pl. binomina).

== History ==
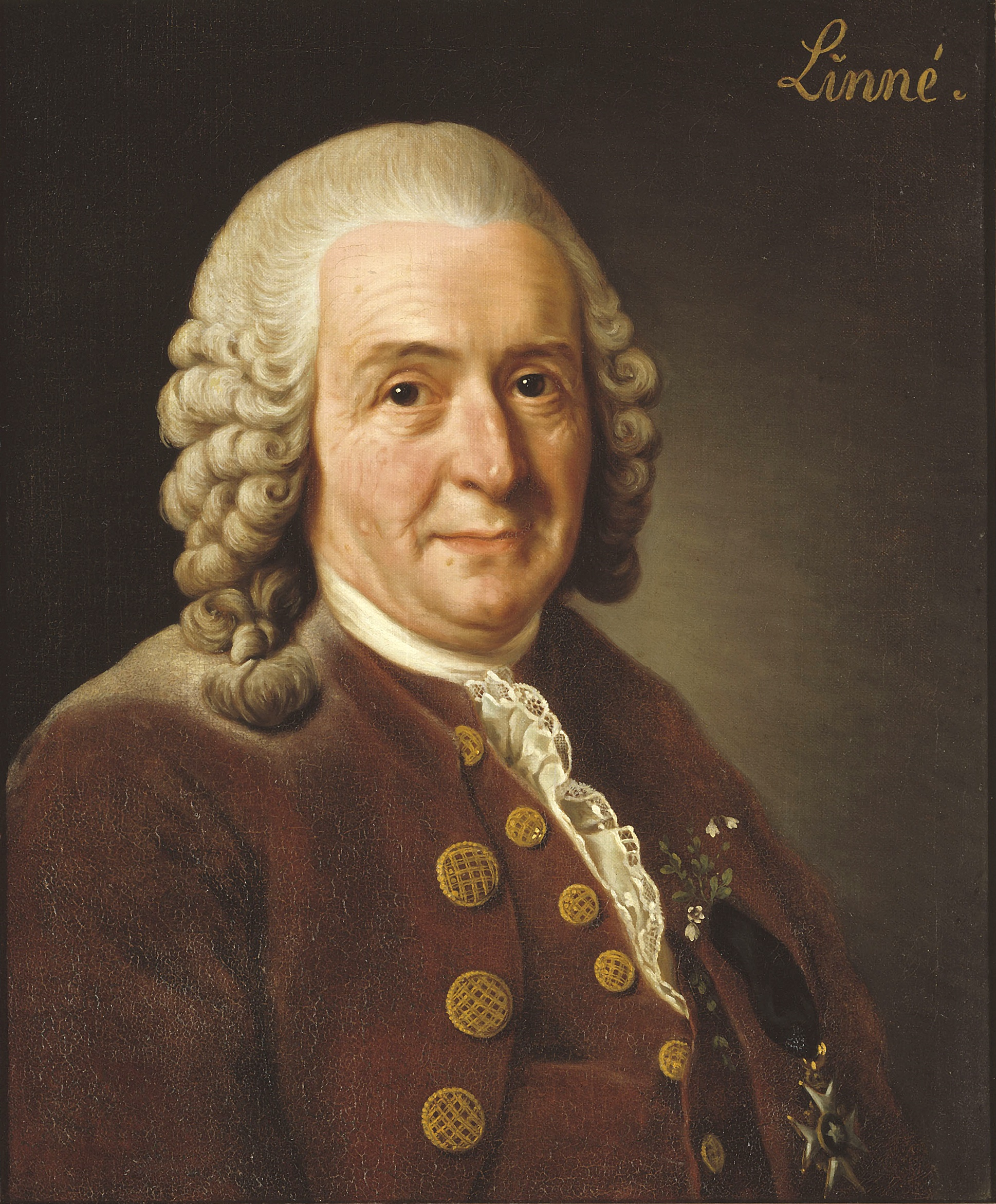
Carl Linnaeus (1707–1778), a Swedish botanist, physician, and zoologist, invented the modern system of binomial nomenclature.

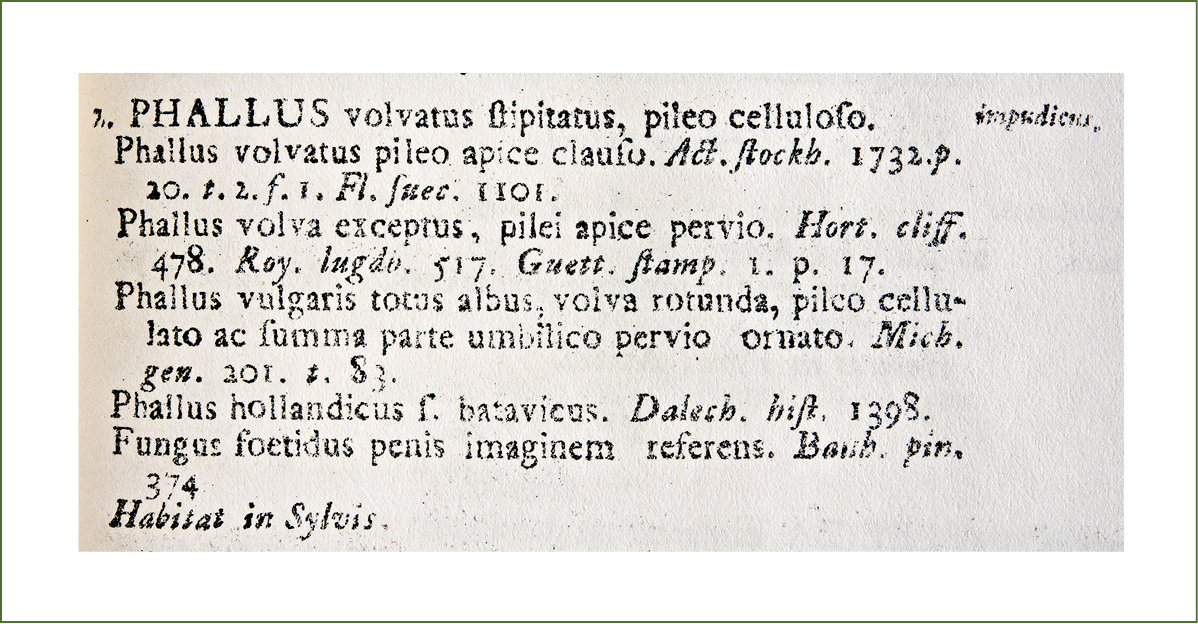
Part of page 1179 of volume 2 of the 1st edition of Linnaeus’s Species Plantarum, describing mushroom species Phallus impudicus. The body text is using polynomial nomenclature, with the trivial name attached in the margin.

Before the adoption of the modern binomial system of naming species, a scientific name consisted of a generic name combined with a specific name that was from one to several words long. Together they formed a system of polynomial nomenclature. These names had two separate functions: to designate or label the species, and to be a diagnosis or description. These two goals were eventually found to be incompatible. In a simple genus that contained few species, it was easy to tell them apart with a one-word genus and a one-word specific name; but as more species were discovered, the names necessarily became longer and unwieldy—for instance, Plantago foliis ovato-lanceolatus pubescentibus, spica cylindrica, scapo tereti ("plantain with pubescent ovate-lanceolate leaves, a cylindric spike and a terete scape"), which we know today as Plantago media.

Such "polynomial names" may sometimes look like binomials, but are different. For example, Gerard's herbal (as amended by Johnson) describes various kinds of spiderwort: "The first is called Phalangium ramosum, Branched Spiderwort; the second, Phalangium non ramosum, Unbranched Spiderwort. The other ... is aptly termed Phalangium Ephemerum Virginianum, Soon-Fading Spiderwort of Virginia". The Latin phrases are short descriptions, rather than identifying labels.

The Bauhins, in particular Caspar Bauhin (1560–1624), took some important steps towards the binomial system by pruning the Latin descriptions, in many cases to two words. The adoption by biologists of a system of strictly binomial nomenclature is due to Swedish botanist and physician Carl Linnaeus (1707–1778). It was in his 1753 Species Plantarum that Linnaeus began consistently using a one-word trivial name (nomen triviale) after a generic name (genus name) in a system of binomial nomenclature. Trivial names had already appeared in his Critica Botanica (1737) and Philosophia Botanica (1751). This trivial name is what is now known as a specific epithet (ICNafp) or specific name (ICZN). The Bauhins' genus names were retained in many of these, but the descriptive part was reduced to a single word.

Linnaeus's trivial names introduced the idea that the function of a name could simply be to give a species a unique label, meaning that the name no longer needed to be descriptive. Both parts could, for example, be derived from the names of people. Thus Gerard's Phalangium ephemerum virginianum became Tradescantia virginiana, where the genus name honoured John Tradescant the Younger, (Note: Some sources say that both John Tradescant the Younger and his father, John Tradescant the Elder, were intended by Linnaeus.) an English botanist and gardener. A bird in the parrot family was named Psittacus alexandri, meaning "Alexander's parrot", after Alexander the Great, whose armies introduced eastern parakeets to Greece. Linnaeus's trivial names were much easier to remember and use than the parallel polynomial names, and eventually replaced them.

Nowadays, many species are mainly referred to by their binomial names, even in non-specialized fields, such as environmental education and the internet in general. Because of this use, the binomial Tyrannosaurus rex is widely known.

== Value ==
The bacterium Escherichia coli, commonly shortened to E. coli

The value of the binomial nomenclature system derives primarily from its economy, its widespread use, and the uniqueness and stability of names that the Codes of Zoological and Botanical, Bacterial and Viral Nomenclature provide:

- Economy. Compared to the polynomial system which it replaced, a binomial name is shorter and easier to remember. It corresponds to the noun-adjective form many vernacular names take to indicate a species within a group (for example, 'brown bear' to refer to a particular type of bear), as well as the widespread system of family name plus given name(s) used to name people in many cultures.
- Widespread use. The binomial system of nomenclature is governed by international codes and is used by biologists worldwide. A few binomials have also entered common speech, such as Homo sapiens, E. coli, Boa constrictor, Tyrannosaurus rex, and Aloe vera.
- Uniqueness. Provided that taxonomists agree as to the limits of a species, it can have only one name that is correct under the appropriate nomenclature code, generally the earliest published if two or more names are accidentally assigned to a species. This means the species a binomial name refers to can be clearly identified, as compared to the common names of species which are usually different in every language. However, establishing that two names actually refer to the same species and then determining which has priority can sometimes be difficult, particularly if the species was named by biologists from different countries. Therefore, a species may have more than one regularly used name; all but one of these names are "synonyms". Furthermore, within zoology or botany, each species name applies to only one species. If a name is used more than once, it is called a homonym.

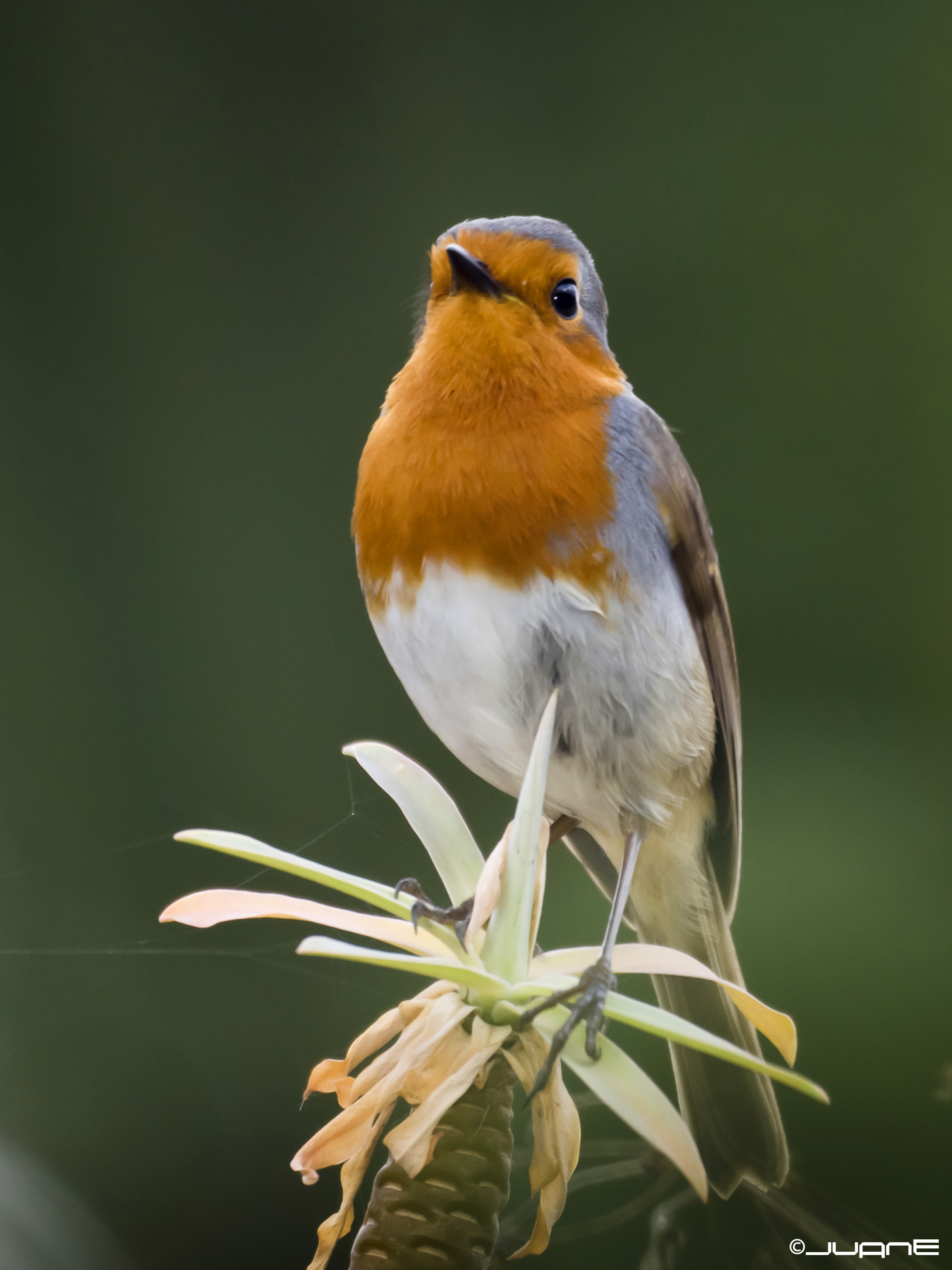
Erithacus rubecula superbus, the Tenerife robin or petirrojo

- Stability. Although stability is far from absolute, the procedures associated with establishing binomial names, such as the principle of priority, tend to favor stability. For example, when species are transferred between genera (as not uncommonly happens as a result of new knowledge), the second part of the binomial is kept the same (unless it becomes a homonym). Thus, there is disagreement among botanists as to whether the genera Chionodoxa and Scilla are sufficiently different for them to be kept separate. Those who keep them separate give the plant commonly grown in gardens in Europe the name Chionodoxa siehei; those who do not give it the name Scilla siehei. The siehei element is constant. Similarly, if what were previously thought to be two distinct species are demoted to a lower rank, such as subspecies, the second part of the binomial name is retained as a trinomen (the third part of the new name). Thus, the Tenerife robin may be treated as a different species from the European robin, in which case its name is Erithacus superbus, or as only a subspecies, in which case its name is Erithacus rubecula superbus. The superbus element of the name is constant, as are its authorship and year of publication.

== Problems ==
Binomial nomenclature for species has the effect that when a species is moved from one genus to another, sometimes the specific name or epithet must be changed as well. This may happen because the specific name is already used in the new genus, or to agree in gender with the new genus if the specific epithet is an adjective modifying the genus name. Some biologists have argued for the combination of the genus name and specific epithet into a single unambiguous name, or for the use of uninomials (as used in nomenclature of ranks above species).

Because genus names are unique only within a nomenclature code, it is possible for homonyms (two or more species sharing the same genus name) to happen, and even the same binomial if they occur in different kingdoms. At least 1,258 instances of genus name duplication occur (mainly between zoology and botany).

== Relationship to classification and taxonomy ==
Nomenclature (including binomial nomenclature) is not the same as classification, although the two are related. Classification is the ordering of items into groups based on similarities or differences; in biological classification, species are one of the kinds of item to be classified. In principle, the names given to species could be completely independent of their classification. This is not the case for binomial names, since the first part of a binomial is the name of the genus into which the species is placed. Above the rank of genus, binomial nomenclature and classification are partly independent; for example, a species retains its binomial name if it is moved from one family to another or from one order to another, unless it better fits a different genus in the same or different family, or it is split from its old genus and placed in a newly created genus. The independence is only partial since the names of families and other higher taxa are usually based on genera.

Taxonomy includes both nomenclature and classification. Its first stages (sometimes called "alpha taxonomy") are concerned with finding, describing and naming species of living or fossil organisms. Binomial nomenclature is thus an important part of taxonomy as it is the system by which species are named. Taxonomists are also concerned with classification, including its principles, procedures and rules.

== Derivation of binomial names ==
A complete binomial name is always treated grammatically as if it were a phrase in the Latin language (hence the common use of the term "Latin name" for a binomial name). However, the two parts of a binomial name can each be derived from a number of sources, of which Latin is only one. These include:

- Latin, from any period, whether classical, medieval or modern. Thus, both parts of the binomial name Homo sapiens are Latin words, meaning "wise" (sapiens) "human/man" (Homo).
- Classical Greek. The genus Rhododendron was named by Linnaeus from the Greek word ῥοδόδενδρον, itself derived from rhodon, "rose", and dendron, "tree". Greek words are often converted to a Latinized form. Thus coca (the plant from which cocaine is obtained) has the name Erythroxylum coca. Erythroxylum is derived from the Greek words erythros, red, and xylon, wood. The Greek ending -ον (-on), when it is neuter, is often converted to the Latin neuter ending -um. (Note: The ending "-on" may derive from the neuter Greek ending -ον, as in Rhodoxylon floridum, or the masculine Greek ending -ων, as in Rhodochiton atrosanguineus.)
- Other languages. The second part of the name Erythroxylum coca is derived from kuka, the name of the plant in Aymara and Quechua. Since many dinosaur fossils were found in Mongolia, their names often use Mongolian words, e.g. Tarchia from tarkhi, meaning "brain", or Saichania meaning "beautiful one".
- Names of people (often naturalists or biologists). The name Magnolia campbellii commemorates two people: Pierre Magnol, a French botanist, and Archibald Campbell, a doctor in British India.
- Names of places. The lone star tick, Amblyomma americanum, is widespread in the United States.
- Other sources. Some binomial names have been constructed from taxonomic anagrams or other re-orderings of existing names. Thus the name of the genus Muilla is derived by reversing the name Allium. Names may also be derived from jokes or puns. For example, Neal Evenhuis described a number of species of flies in a genus he named Pieza, including Pieza pi, Pieza rhea, Pieza kake, and Pieza deresistans, alluding to "piece of pie", "pizzeria", "piece of cake", and "pièce de résistance" respectively.

The first part of the name, which identifies the genus, must be a word that can be treated as a Latin singular noun in the nominative case. It must be unique within the purview of each nomenclatural code, but can be repeated between them. Thus Huia recurvata is an extinct species of plant, found as fossils in Yunnan, China, whereas Huia masonii is a species of frog found in Java, Indonesia.

The second part of the name, which identifies the species within the genus, is also treated grammatically as a Latin word. It can have one of a number of forms:

- The second part of a binomial may be an adjective. If so, the form of the adjective must agree with the genus name in gender. Latin nouns can have three genders, masculine, feminine and neuter, and many Latin adjectives will have two or three different endings, depending upon the gender of the noun they refer to. The house sparrow has the binomial name Passer domesticus. Here domesticus ("domestic") simply means "associated with the house". The sacred bamboo is Nandina domestica rather than Nandina domesticus, since Nandina is feminine whereas Passer is masculine. The tropical fruit langsat is a product of the plant Lansium parasiticum, since Lansium is neuter. Some common endings for Latin adjectives in the three genders (masculine, feminine, neuter) are -us, -a, -um (as in the previous example of domesticus); -is, -is, -e (e.g., tristis, meaning "sad"); and -or -or -us (e.g., minor, meaning "smaller"). For further information, see Latin declension: Adjectives.
- The second part of a binomial may be a noun in the nominative case. An example is the binomial name of the lion, which is Panthera leo. Grammatically the noun is said to be in apposition to the genus name and the two nouns do not have to agree in gender; in this case, Panthera is feminine and leo is masculine.

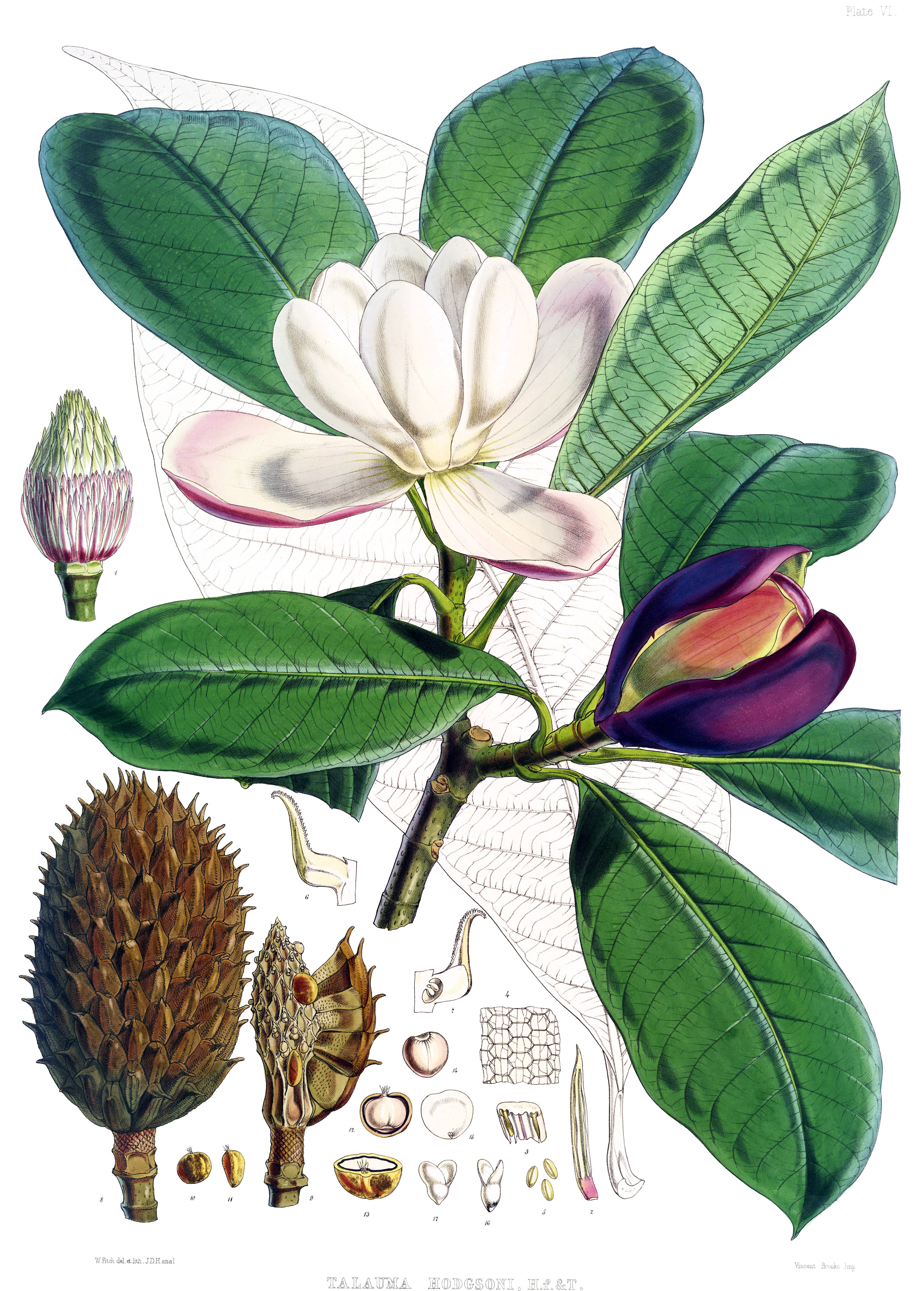
Magnolia hodgsonii

- The second part of a binomial may be a noun in the genitive (possessive) case. The genitive case is constructed in a number of ways in Latin, depending on the declension of the noun. Common endings for masculine and neuter nouns are -ii or -i in the singular and -orum in the plural, and for feminine nouns -ae in the singular and -arum in the plural. The noun may be part of a person's name, often the surname, as in the Tibetan antelope (Pantholops hodgsonii), the shrub Magnolia hodgsonii, or the olive-backed pipit (Anthus hodgsoni). The meaning is "of the person named", so Magnolia hodgsonii means "Hodgson's magnolia". The -ii or -i endings show that in each case Hodgson was a man (not the same one); had Hodgson been a woman, hodgsonae would have been used. The person commemorated in the binomial name is not usually (if ever) the person who created the name; for example, Anthus hodgsoni was named by Charles Wallace Richmond, in honour of Hodgson. Rather than a person, the noun may be related to a place, as with Latimeria chalumnae, meaning "of the Chalumna River". Another use of genitive nouns is in, for example, the name of the bacterium Escherichia coli, where coli means "of the colon". This formation is common in parasites, as in Xenos vesparum, where vesparum means "of the wasps", since Xenos vesparum is a parasite of wasps.

Whereas the first part of a binomial name must be unique within the purview of each nomenclatural code, the second part is quite commonly used in two or more genera (as is shown by examples of hodgsonii above), but cannot be used more than once within a single genus. The full binomial name must be unique within each code.

== Codes ==
From the early 19th century onwards, it became ever more apparent that a body of rules was necessary to govern scientific names. In the course of time these became nomenclature codes. The International Code of Zoological Nomenclature (ICZN) governs the naming of animals, the International Code of Nomenclature for algae, fungi, and plants (ICNafp) that of plants (including cyanobacteria), and the International Code of Nomenclature of Bacteria (ICNB) that of bacteria (including Archaea). Virus names are governed by the International Committee on Taxonomy of Viruses (ICTV), a taxonomic code, which determines taxa as well as names. These codes differ in certain ways, for example:

- "Binomial nomenclature" is the correct term for botany, although it is also used by zoologists. Since 1961, "binominal nomenclature" is the technically correct term in zoology. A binomial name is also called a binomen (plural binomina) or binominal name.
- Both codes consider the first part of the two-part name for a species to be the "generic name". In the zoological code (ICZN), the second part of the name is a "specific name". In the botanical code (ICNafp), it is a "specific epithet". Together, these two parts are referred to as a "species name" or "binomen" in the zoological code: or "species name", "binomial", or "binary combination" in the botanical code. "Species name" is the only term common to the two codes.
- The ICNafp, the plant code, does not allow the two parts of a binomial name to be the same (such a name is called a tautonym), whereas the ICZN, the animal code, does. Thus the American bison has the binomen Bison bison; a name of this kind would not be allowed for a plant.
- The starting points, the time from which these codes are in effect (retroactively), vary from group to group. In botany, the starting point will often be in 1753 (the year Carl Linnaeus first published Species Plantarum). In zoology, the starting point is 1758 (1 January 1758 is considered the date of the publication of Linnaeus's Systema Naturae, 10th Edition, and also Clerck's Aranei Svecici). Bacteriology started anew, with a starting point on 1 January 1980.

Summary of terminology for the names of species in the ICZN and ICNafp
| Code | Full name | First part | Second part |
|---|---|---|---|
| ICZN | species name, binomen, binominal name | generic name, genus name | specific name |
| ICNafp | species name, binary combination, binomial (name) | generic name | specific epithet |

Unifying the different codes into a single code, the "BioCode", has been suggested, although implementation is not in sight. (There is also a published code for a different system of biotic nomenclature, which does not use ranks above species, but instead names clades. This is called PhyloCode.)

=== Differences in handling personal names ===
As noted above, there are some differences between the codes in how binomials can be formed; for example the ICZN allows both parts to be the same, while the ICNafp does not. Another difference is in how personal names are used in forming specific names or epithets. The ICNafp sets out precise rules by which a personal name is to be converted to a specific epithet. In particular, names ending in a consonant (but not "er") are treated as first being converted into Latin by adding "-ius" (for a man) or "-ia" (for a woman), and then being made genitive (i.e. meaning "of that person or persons"). This produces specific epithets like lecardii for Lecard (male), wilsoniae for Wilson (female), and brauniarum for the Braun sisters. By contrast, the ICZN does not require the intermediate creation of a Latin form of a personal name, allowing the genitive ending to be added directly to the personal name. This explains the difference between the names of the plant Magnolia hodgsonii and the bird Anthus hodgsoni. Furthermore, the ICNafp requires names not published in the form required by the code to be corrected to conform to it, whereas the ICZN is more protective of the form used by the original author.

== Writing binomial names ==
By tradition, the binomial names of species are usually typeset in italics; for example, Homo sapiens. When handwritten, a binomial name should be underlined; for example, Homo sapiens.

The first part of the binomial, the genus name, is always written with an initial capital letter. Older sources, particularly botanical works published before the 1950s, used a different convention: if the second part of the name was derived from a proper noun, e.g., the name of a person or place, a capital letter was used. Thus, the modern form Berberis darwinii was written as Berberis Darwinii. A capital was also used when the name is formed by two nouns in apposition, e.g., Panthera Leo or Centaurea Cyanus. (Note: The modern notation was resisted by some, partly because writing names like Centaurea cyanus can suggest that cyanus is an adjective which should agree with Centaurea, i.e. that the name should be Centaurea cyana, whereas Cyanus is derived from the Greek name for the cornflower.) In current usage, the second part is never written with an initial capital.

When used with a common name, the scientific name often follows in parentheses, although this varies with publication. For example, "The house sparrow (Passer domesticus) is decreasing in Europe."

The binomial name should generally be written in full. The exception to this is when several species from the same genus are being listed or discussed in the same paper or report, or the same species is mentioned repeatedly; in which case the genus is written in full when it is first used, but may then be abbreviated to an initial (and a period/full stop). For example, a list of members of the genus Canis might be written as "Canis lupus, C. aureus, C. simensis". In rare cases, this abbreviated form has spread to more general use; for example, the bacterium Escherichia coli is often referred to as just E. coli, and Tyrannosaurus rex is perhaps even better known simply as T. rex, these two both often appearing in this form in popular writing even where the full genus name has not already been given.

The abbreviation "sp." is used when the actual specific name cannot or need not be specified. The abbreviation "spp." (standing for species pluralis, Latin for "multiple species") indicates "several species". These abbreviations are not italicised (or underlined). For example: "Canis sp." means "an unspecified species of the genus Canis", while "Canis spp." means "two or more species of the genus Canis". (These abbreviations should not be confused with the abbreviations "ssp." (zoology) or "subsp." (botany), plurals "sspp." or "subspp.", referring to one or more subspecies. See trinomen (zoology) and infraspecific name.)

The abbreviation "cf." (i.e., confer in Latin) is used to compare individuals/taxa with known/described species. Conventions for use of the "cf." qualifier vary. In paleontology, it is typically used when the identification is not confirmed. For example, "Corvus cf. nasicus" was used to indicate "a fossil bird similar to the Cuban crow but not certainly identified as this species". In molecular systematics papers, "cf." may be used to indicate one or more undescribed species assumed to be related to a described species. For example, in a paper describing the phylogeny of small benthic freshwater fish called darters, five undescribed putative species (Ozark, Sheltowee, Wildcat, Ihiyo, and Mamequit darters), notable for brightly colored nuptial males with distinctive color patterns, were referred to as "Etheostoma cf. spectabile" because they had been viewed as related to, but distinct from, Etheostoma spectabile (orangethroat darter). This view was supported to varying degrees by DNA analysis. The somewhat informal use of taxa names with qualifying abbreviations is referred to as open nomenclature and it is not subject to strict usage codes.

In some contexts, the dagger symbol ("†") may be used before or after the binomial name to indicate that the species is extinct.

== Authority ==
In scholarly texts, at least the first or main use of the binomial name is usually followed by the "authority" – a way of designating the scientist(s) who first published the name. The authority is written in slightly different ways in zoology and botany. For names governed by the ICZN the surname is usually written in full together with the date (normally only the year) of publication. One example of author citation of scientific name is: "Amabela Möschler, 1880." (Note: Here Amabela is the name of the genus. It is written in italic form. Followed by the last name of the scientist who discovered it (Heinrich Benno Möschler), a comma, and the year when it was published.) The ICZN recommends that the "original author and date of a name should be cited at least once in each work dealing with the taxon denoted by that name." For names governed by the ICNafp the name is generally reduced to a standard abbreviation and the date omitted. The International Plant Names Index maintains an approved list of botanical author abbreviations. Historically, abbreviations were used in zoology too.

When the original name is changed, e.g., the species is moved to a different genus, both codes use parentheses around the original authority; the ICNafp also requires the person who made the change to be given. In the ICNafp, the original name is then called the basionym. Some examples:

- (Plant) Amaranthus retroflexus L. – "L." is the standard abbreviation for "Linnaeus"; the absence of parentheses shows that this is his original name.
- (Plant) Hyacinthoides italica (L.) Rothm. – Linnaeus first named the Italian bluebell Scilla italica; that is the basionym. Rothmaler later transferred it to the genus Hyacinthoides.
- (Animal) Passer domesticus (Linnaeus, 1758) – the original name given by Linnaeus was Fringilla domestica; unlike the ICNafp, the ICZN does not require the name of the person who changed the genus (Mathurin Jacques Brisson) to be given.

== Other ranks ==
Binomial nomenclature, as described here, is a system for naming species. Implicitly, it includes a system for naming genera, since the first part of the name of the species is a genus name. In a classification system based on ranks, there are also ways of naming ranks above the level of genus and below the level of species. Ranks above genus (e.g., family, order, class) receive one-part names, which are conventionally not written in italics. Thus, the house sparrow, Passer domesticus, belongs to the family Passeridae. Family names are normally based on genus names, such as in zoology, although the endings used differ between zoology and botany.

Ranks below species receive three-part names, conventionally written in italics like the names of species. There are significant differences between the ICZN and the ICNafp. In zoology, the only formal rank below species is subspecies and the name is written simply as three parts (a trinomen). Thus, one of the subspecies of the olive-backed pipit is Anthus hodgsoni berezowskii. Informally, in some circumstances, a form may be appended, though such names are unavailable, and have no formal standing in zoological nomenclature (i.e., they have no recognized author or date, and do not compete for homonymy). For example Harmonia axyridis f. spectabilis is the harlequin ladybird in its black or melanic forms having four large orange or red spots. In botany, there are many ranks below species and although the name itself is written in three parts, a "connecting term" (not part of the name) is needed to show the rank. Thus, the American black elder is Sambucus nigra subsp. canadensis; the white-flowered form of the ivy-leaved cyclamen is Cyclamen hederifolium f. albiflorum.

== See also ==
- Glossary of scientific naming
- Botanical name
- Genus–differentia definition
- Hybrid name (botany)
- List of botanists by author abbreviation
- List of Latin and Greek words commonly used in systematic names
- List of organisms named after famous people
- List of zoologists by author abbreviation
- Scientific terminology
- Species description
- Undescribed taxon

== Bibliography ==
- Hyam, R.; Pankhurst, R. J. (1995). Plants and their names: A concise dictionary. Oxford: Oxford University Press. ISBN 978-0-19-866189-4.
- Johnson, A.T.; Smith, H. A. (1972). Plant Names Simplified: Their Pronunciation Derivation & Meaning. Buckenhill, Herefordshire: Landsmans Bookshop. ISBN 978-0-900513-04-6.
- International Commission on Zoological Nomenclature (1999). International Code of Zoological Nomenclature online (4th ed.). The International Trust for Zoological Nomenclature. ISBN 978-0-85301-006-7.
- McNeill, J.; Barrie, F. R.; Buck, W. R.; Demoulin, V.; Greuter, W.; Hawksworth, D. L.; Herendeen, P. S.; Knapp, S.; Marhold, K.; Prado, J.; Prud'homme Van Reine, W. F.; Smith, G. F.; Wiersema, J. H.; Turland, N. J. (2012). International Code of Nomenclature for algae, fungi, and plants (Melbourne Code) adopted by the Eighteenth International Botanical Congress Melbourne, Australia, July 2011. Regnum Vegetabile 154. Königstein, Germany: Koeltz Scientific Books. ISBN 978-3-87429-425-6. Archived from the original on 7 May 2017.
