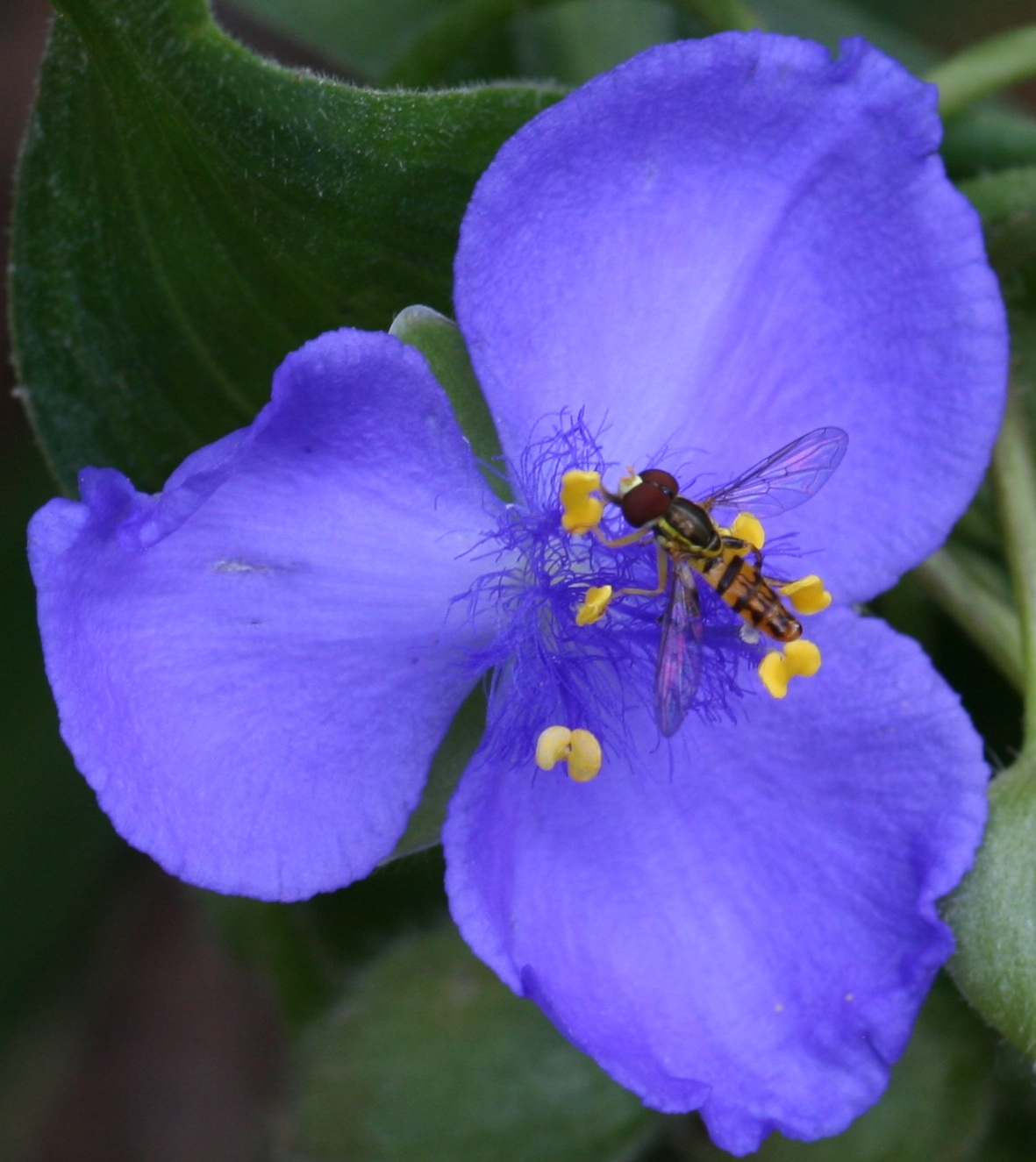
- Open flower with a Toxomerus sp. hoverfly feeding

Conservation status
- Secure (NatureServe)

Scientific classification
- Kingdom: Plantae
- Clade: Embryophytes
- Clade: Tracheophytes
- Clade: Spermatophytes
- Clade: Angiosperms
- Clade: Monocots
- Clade: Commelinids
- Order: Commelinales
- Family: Commelinaceae
- Genus: Tradescantia
- Species: T. virginiana

Binomial name
- Tradescantia virginiana L.

= Tradescantia virginiana =

Species of flowering plant

Tradescantia virginiana, the Virginia spiderwort, is a species of flowering plant in the family Commelinaceae (the spiderwort family). It is the type species of the genus Tradescantia, native to the eastern United States. Common names include Virginia spiderwort, common spiderwort, lady's tears, and spider lily.

== Description ==
Virginia spiderwort is an herbaceous, perennial, clump-forming plant that is native to eastern and central United States and Ontario, Canada. It is considered a wildflower, and whole plant habits include arching, clumping, erect, and spreading. This species arises from a cluster of stout, overwintering roots. It spreads through underground stems to form large colonies. The plant can grow 1.5–3 feet (0.46–0.91 m) tall and 1–1.5 ft (0.30–0.46 m) wide. Stems of this species are commonly clumped but may be solitary. They can be smooth or have scattered, short hairs and usually grow unbranched. Each stem has 2–5 leaves attached by a leaf sheath that is one to three centimeters long. The leaf blades are elongate, arching, long, and narrow with a prominent midrib that gradually ends in a tapered tip. The leaves can grow up to 1 ft (0.30 m) long and 1 inch (2.5 cm) wide.

The lightly fragrant flowers of this species occur in tight clusters at the apex of the stem with bracts similar to the leaves located below each flower. The opened flowers are elevated above the cluster of buds on a pubescent pedicel. This pedicel can be up to 1.4 in (3.5 cm) long. There are three sepals that are green, ovate, and pubescent. In open flowers, a majority of the sepals are hidden by the petals except for the tips. There are also three petals that are broadly ovate and range in size between 0.47–0.71 in (1.2–1.8 cm) long. Petals can range in color from rose/pink or white to blue or purple. Flowers are bisexual and have six stamens that are clustered around the center of the flower. The stamens are made up of the filaments that have dense hairs and are topped with yellow anthers. The ovary is superior and three-lobed, which is hidden by the pubescent stamens. The fruit of this species is a capsule, which is hairless, 4–7 millimeters long, and yields 6 seeds or fewer. Flowers of this species are ephemeral, lasting for a very short time (about half of a day). After flowering, the petals dissolve into drops of purple liquid, and the pedicles recurve, which positions the fruit capsules below the bracts. Though the flowers only bloom for about half of a day, the flowers are produced daily for several weeks.

== Distribution and habitat ==
=== Distribution ===
This species is native to the eastern and central United States in a variety of states, including Alabama, Connecticut, Delaware, Georgia, Illinois, Indiana, Kentucky, Louisiana, Maine, Maryland, Massachusetts, Missouri, New Hampshire, New Jersey, New York, North Carolina, Ohio, Pennsylvania, Rhode Island, South Carolina, Tennessee, Vermont, West Virginia, and Wisconsin. Its native range also extends north in Ontario, Canada and south in Cuba. Along with this species' native range, it has also been introduced into the state of California and in other countries, including France, Germany, Great Britain, Italy, Madeira, North Caucasus, and Transcaucasus.

=== Habitat ===
Virginia spiderwort inhabits wood edges, upland forests, rocky open woods, meadows/moist prairies, fertile woodlands, and limestone outcrops. It can be found along roadsides, railway lines, and fence rows. This species is typically said to inhabit acidic soils but is normally found in neutral soils ranging in pH from 6.0–8.0. Virginia spiderwort is known to prefer shaded areas but can sometimes be found in full sun. Bumblebees (Bombus sp.) are the major pollinators of this species, but hummingbirds (Archilochus sp.) and butterflies (Order Lepidoptera) are also known to pollinate them.

== Taxonomy ==
A United States native group of 17 species are particularly close relatives of T. virginiana and many are known to hybridize. A majority of the commercially available plants labelled T. virginiana in cultivation are actually complex hybrids, mostly derived from crosses between T. virginiana, T. ohiensis (bluejacket), and T. subaspera (zigzag spiderwort). These hybrids have been called by the invalid name T. × andersoniana, but are now correctly known as the Andersoniana Cultivar Group.

== History ==
The Commelinaceae family is believed to have evolved sometime during the mid- to late- Cretaceous period, with estimates of the family's origin ranging between 123 and 73 million years ago. Diversification within the group followed between an estimated 110 and 66 million years ago. There is little information on when the genus Tradescantia evolved. The scientific name of the genus Tradescantia was chosen by Carl Linnaeus. He chose this name to honor English naturalists and explorers John Tradescant the Elder and John Tradescant the Younger, who were plant collectors and gardeners for King Charles I of England. The youngest John Tradescant traveled to Virginia in the 1630s, and then sent specimens back to England, particularly of the genus Tradescantia. This is how this species was given the name Tradescantia virginiana.

== Topics of interest ==
Virginia spiderwort has a history of ethnobotany that is tied to Native American tribes, specifically the Cherokee, for food and medicinal purposes. The younger leaves were mixed with other greens and eaten raw or boiled. The plant was also used as a tea to treat stomachaches from overeating and serve as a laxative. The plant was also combined with other ingredients to form a tea used to treat female ailments. For medicinal purposes, the plant was often mashed and rubbed onto insect bites to relieve itching and related pain. The root would be mashed and turned into a paste to treat cancer. Kidney issues were also amongst the illnesses that the plant could serve.

Biology teachers can use this plant when teaching cell structures. The hairs on the stamen of this plant consist of a chain of single cells. Under a microscope, the nucleus and flowing cytoplasm of these cells are clearly visible.

The common name of the genus Tradescantia, spiderwort, could have come from a variety of physical characteristics. The most common explanation is that the angled arrangement of the leaves resembles a spider that is squatting. Another explanation claims that the name may be based on the threadlike secretions that come from the stem when cut, which resemble spider silk. The purple silk-like threads that are in the center of the flower could also explain the common name.

== Cultivation ==
Virginia spiderwort is a sturdy plant and will persist in a variety of sunlight and soil conditions. The plant prefers moist soils and shade but will adapt to drier soil and full sun. These plants can be propagated from a seed but are better suited for starting from cuttings or divisions. Established plants will grow by themselves, and stalks on the ground will root from the nodes. To manage Virginia spiderwort, they can be partially clipped back after blooming. These plants can also be partially controlled by dividing them and regularly removing slumping stalks every two to four years. Flowering occurs from April to July.

== Cautions ==
Poison severity for humans is low but can be mildly toxic to humans and pets if ingested. In small amounts, ingestion can cause mouth and stomach irritation. Poison parts include the leaves and sap/juice. Handling the leaves or sap of this plant can cause contact dermatitis leaving skin irritation, redness, and itching in both humans and dogs/cats. The poison/toxic principle of this plant is unknown, but possibly is related to oxalate crystals. Virginia spiderwort does not have any serious disease or insect issues. Snails can sometimes damage the net growth of the species. It does have invasive qualities and can spread easily by seed, requiring control.

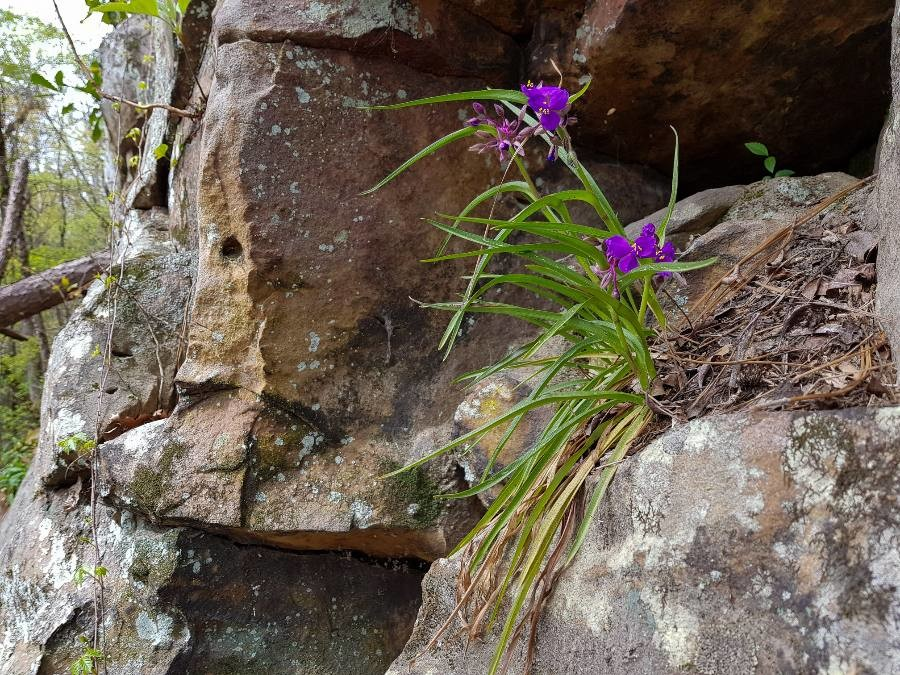

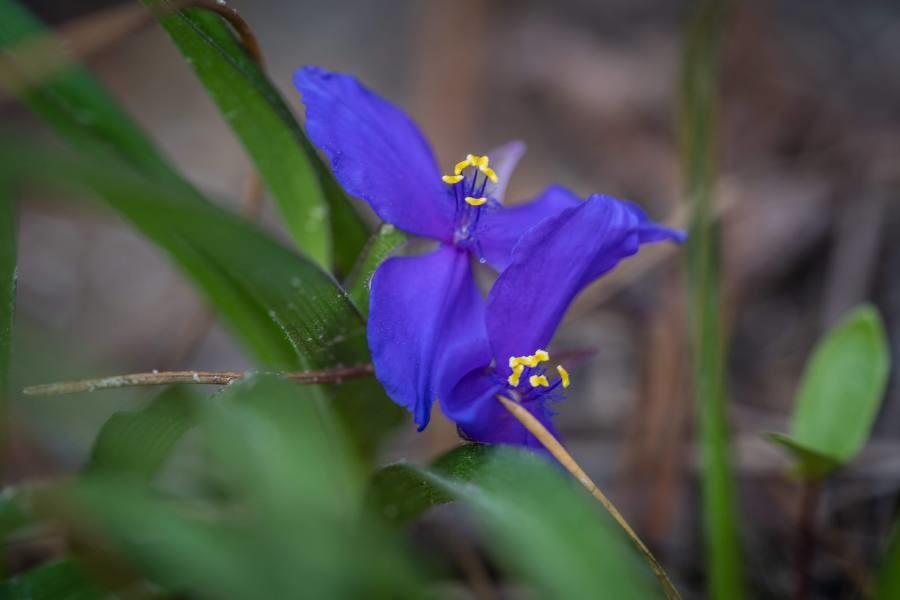
