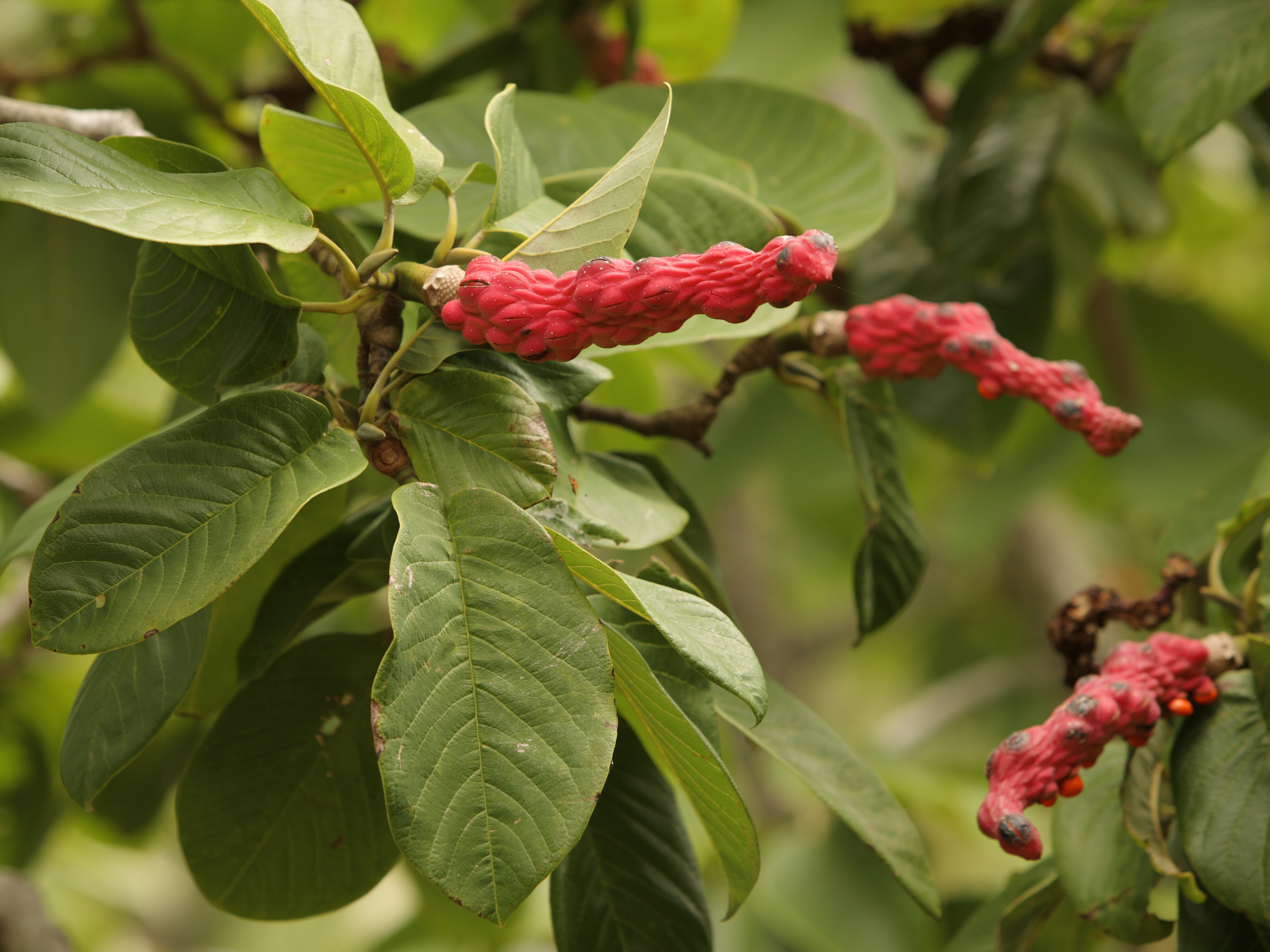

Conservation status
- Least Concern (IUCN 3.1)

Scientific classification
- Kingdom: Plantae
- Clade: Embryophytes
- Clade: Tracheophytes
- Clade: Spermatophytes
- Clade: Angiosperms
- Clade: Magnoliids
- Order: Magnoliales
- Family: Magnoliaceae
- Genus: Magnolia
- Subgenus: Magnolia subg. Yulania
- Section: Magnolia sect. Yulania
- Subsection: Magnolia subsect. Yulania
- Species: M. campbellii

Binomial name
- Magnolia campbellii Hook.f. & Thomson

Synonyms
- Magnolia campbellii var. alba Tresder; Magnolia campbellii var. mollicomata (W.W.Sm.) F.S.Ward; Magnolia campbellii subsp. mollicomata (W.W.Sm.) Johnstone; Magnolia mollicomata W.W.Sm.; Yulania campbellii (Hook.f. & Thomson) D.L.Fu

= Magnolia campbellii =

Species of tree

Magnolia campbellii, or Campbell's magnolia, is a species of Magnolia that grows in sheltered valleys in the Himalaya from eastern Nepal, Sikkim and Assam, India, east to southwestern China (southern Tibet, Yunnan, southern Sichuan) and south to northern Myanmar.

== Description ==
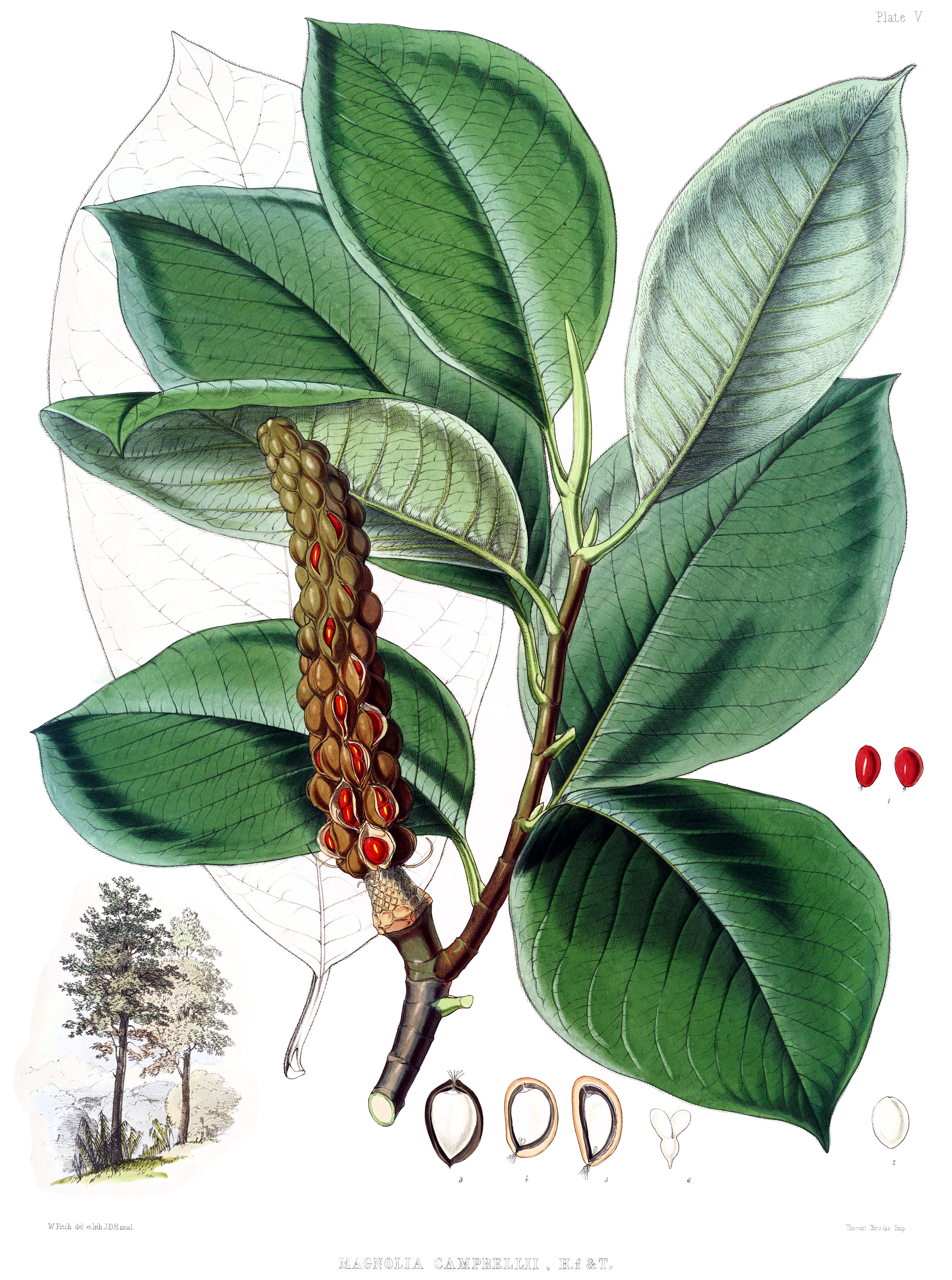
Leaves and seeds

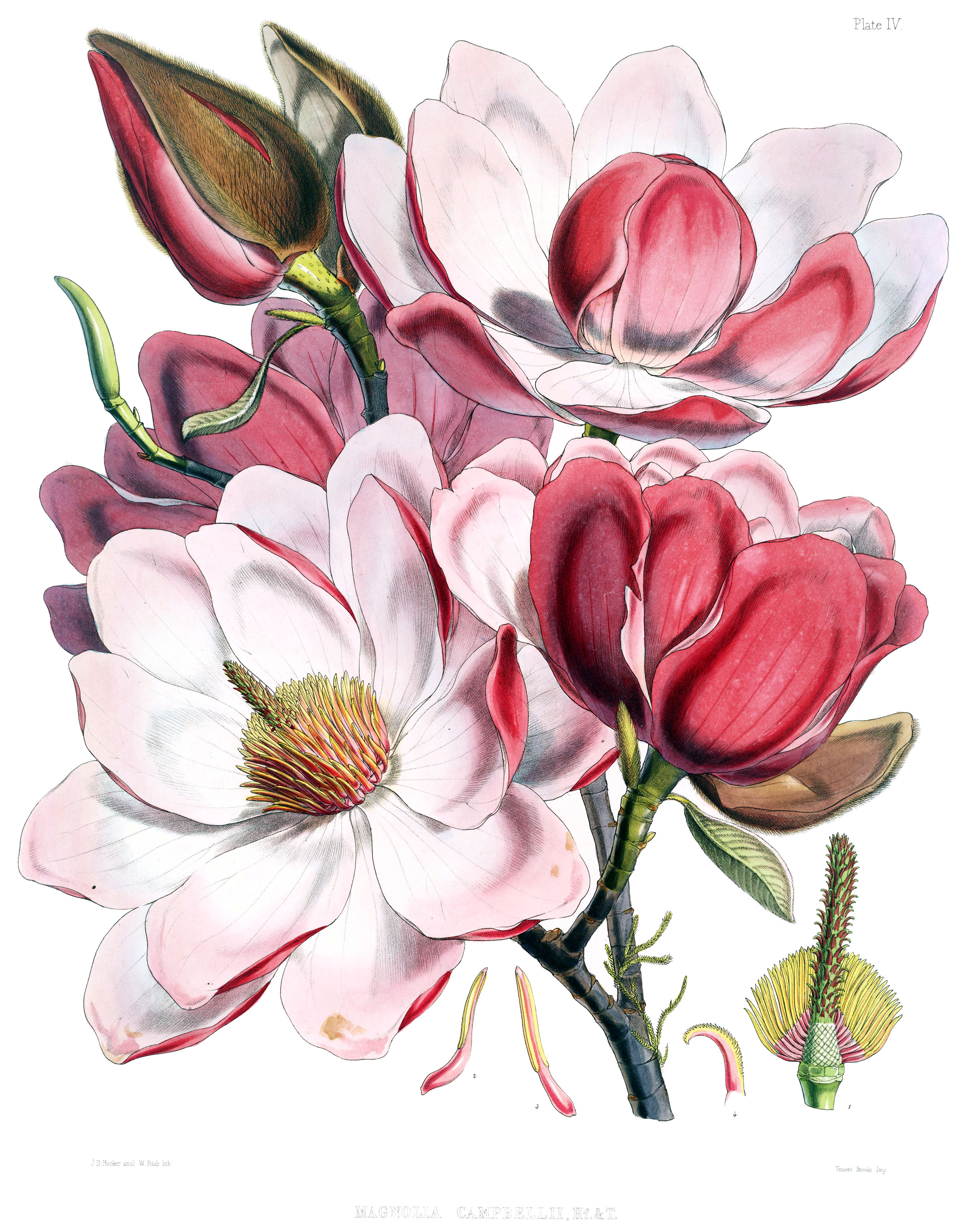
Flowers

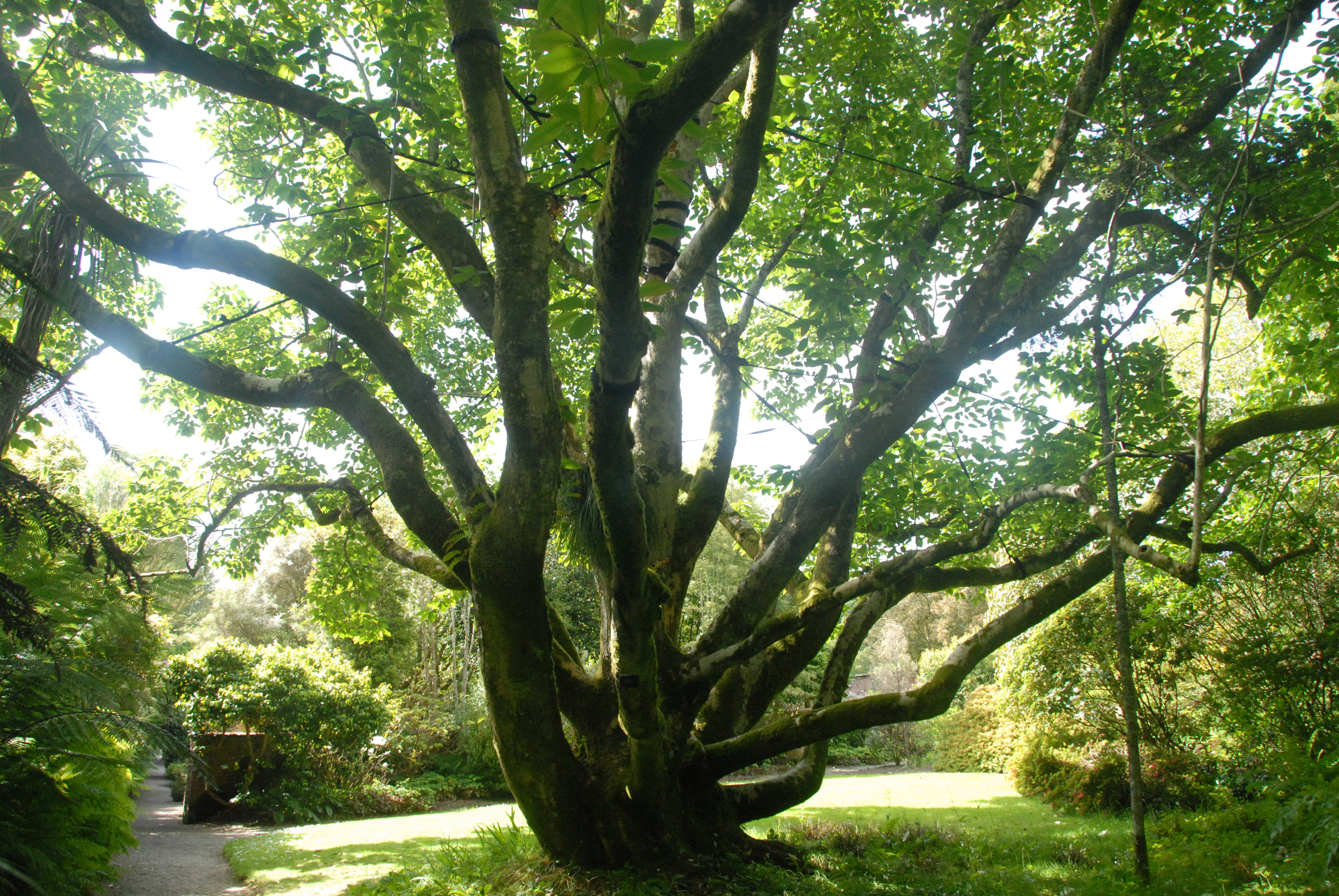
Magnolia campbellii in Trengwainton Garden, Cornwall

Magnolia campbellii is a medium-sized to large deciduous tree growing to 30 m, rarely to 45 m, tall, with smooth grey bark. The leaves are 10–23 cm (rarely to 33 cm) long and 4.5–10 cm (rarely to 14 cm) broad, fuzzy underneath and with an acute apex. The flowers are very large, 15–25 cm (rarely 35 cm) diameter, with 12-16 tepals, which vary from white to dark pink. They appear very early, before the leaves, opening from late winter to early spring. After opening, the innermost tepals remain erect while the others spread widely. This arrangement may shelter the stamens and stigmas from rain, snow, and other harsh environmental conditions common during their very early flowering time period.

Hooker named the species after Archibald Campbell, Superintendent of Darjeeling.

=== Varieties ===
There are two varieties:

- Magnolia campbellii var. campbellii. Western part of the species' range, in the Himalaya. Shoots and flower stalks thinly hairy.
- Magnolia campbellii var. mollicomata. Eastern part of the species' range, in Yunnan and surrounding areas. Shoots more densely hairy, flower stalks thickly felted.

== Cultivation ==
Magnolia campbellii is grown as an ornamental tree for its breathtaking flowers, though successful flowering is limited to mild areas with no late spring frosts. Magnolia campbellii var. mollicomata flowers slightly later and is less likely to have its flowers frost-damaged.

Young trees take a long time to reach flowering age and need deep, moist soil and a mild, sheltered site.

=== Cultivars ===
Several cultivars have been named, including 'Alba' (white flowers), 'Charles Raffil' (bright purple-pink flowers; starts flowering on younger trees), and 'Strybing White' (white flowers).

A number of hybrids with other Magnolias have also been developed.
