= Amabela =

Scientific classification
- Domain: Eukaryota
- Kingdom: Animalia
- Phylum: Arthropoda
- Class: Insecta
- Order: Lepidoptera
- Superfamily: Noctuoidea
- Family: Noctuidae (?)
- Subfamily: Catocalinae
- Genus: Amabela; Moschler, 1880

Genus of moths

Amabela is a genus of moths of the family Noctuidae. Its authoritarian scientific name is Amabela Möschler, 1880.

== Species ==
- Amabela carsinodes Hampson, 1924
- Amabela delicata Moschler, 1880
