= Bauhin =

The Bauhin family is a family of physicians and scientists.

Jean Bauhin (1511–1582): a French surgeon, who moved with his family to Basel after conversion to Protestantism. His two sons of three were:

- Gaspard Bauhin (or Caspar Bauhin) (1560–1624): Swiss-French botanist. The ileocecal valve is also called Bauhin's valve, named after him.
- Johann Bauhin (or Jean Bauhin) (1541–1613): Swiss-French botanist.

== Related to Bauhin family ==
- Carl Linnaeus named the genus of plants Bauhinia after the Bauhin brothers.
