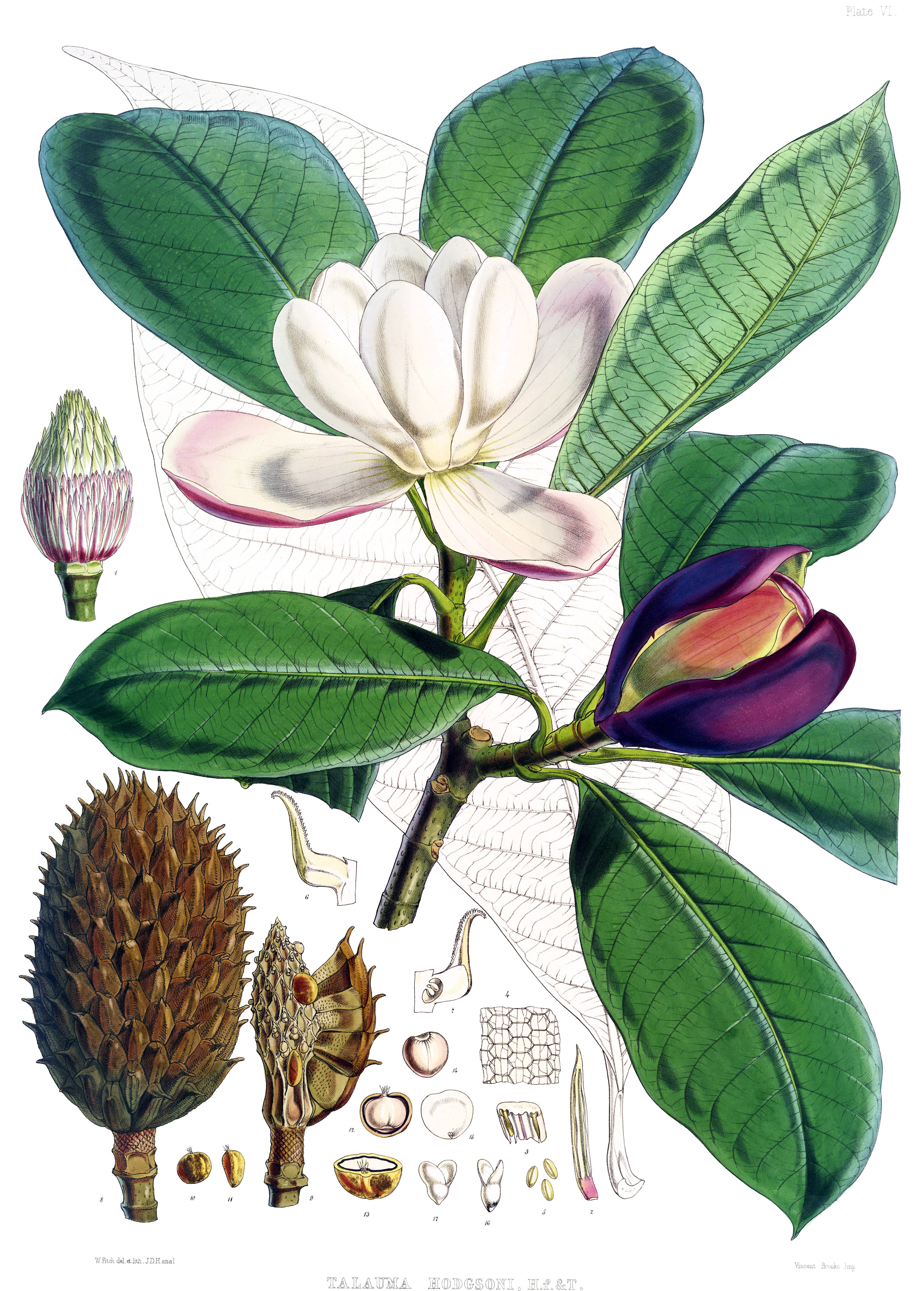
- Color plate from Illustrations of Himalayan plants, by Joseph Dalton Hooker, et al. For the original caption see notation

Conservation status
- Least Concern (IUCN 3.1)

Scientific classification
- Kingdom: Plantae
- Clade: Embryophytes
- Clade: Tracheophytes
- Clade: Spermatophytes
- Clade: Angiosperms
- Clade: Magnoliids
- Order: Magnoliales
- Family: Magnoliaceae
- Genus: Magnolia
- Subgenus: Magnolia subg. Magnolia
- Section: Magnolia sect. Gwillimia
- Subsection: Magnolia subsect. Blumiana
- Species: M. hodgsonii

Binomial name
- Magnolia hodgsonii (Hook.f. & Thomson) H.Keng

Synonyms
- Lirianthe hodgsonii (Hook.f. & Thomson) Sima & S.G.Lu; Talauma hodgsonii Hook.f. & Thomson

= Magnolia hodgsonii =

Species of tree

Magnolia hodgsonii (syn. Talauma hodgsonii), known in Chinese as gai lie mu is a species of Magnolia native to the forests of the Himalaya and southeastern Asia, occurring in Bhutan, southwestern China, Tibet, northeastern India, northern Myanmar, Nepal, and Thailand. It grows at moderate elevations of 850–1500 m with a subtropical climate.

It is a small evergreen tree up to 15 m tall. The leaves are obovate-oblong, 20–50 cm long and 10–13 cm broad, with a leathery texture. The flowers are fragrant, with nine tepals up to 9 cm long, the inner tepals white, the outer ones greenish; they are produced in April to May. The fruit is 13–15 cm long, composed of an aggregate of 40-80 follicles.

The wood is "very soft and worthless". Like almost all Himalayan Magnoliaceae, M. hodgsonii flourishes in a stiff clay soil.

== Gallery ==
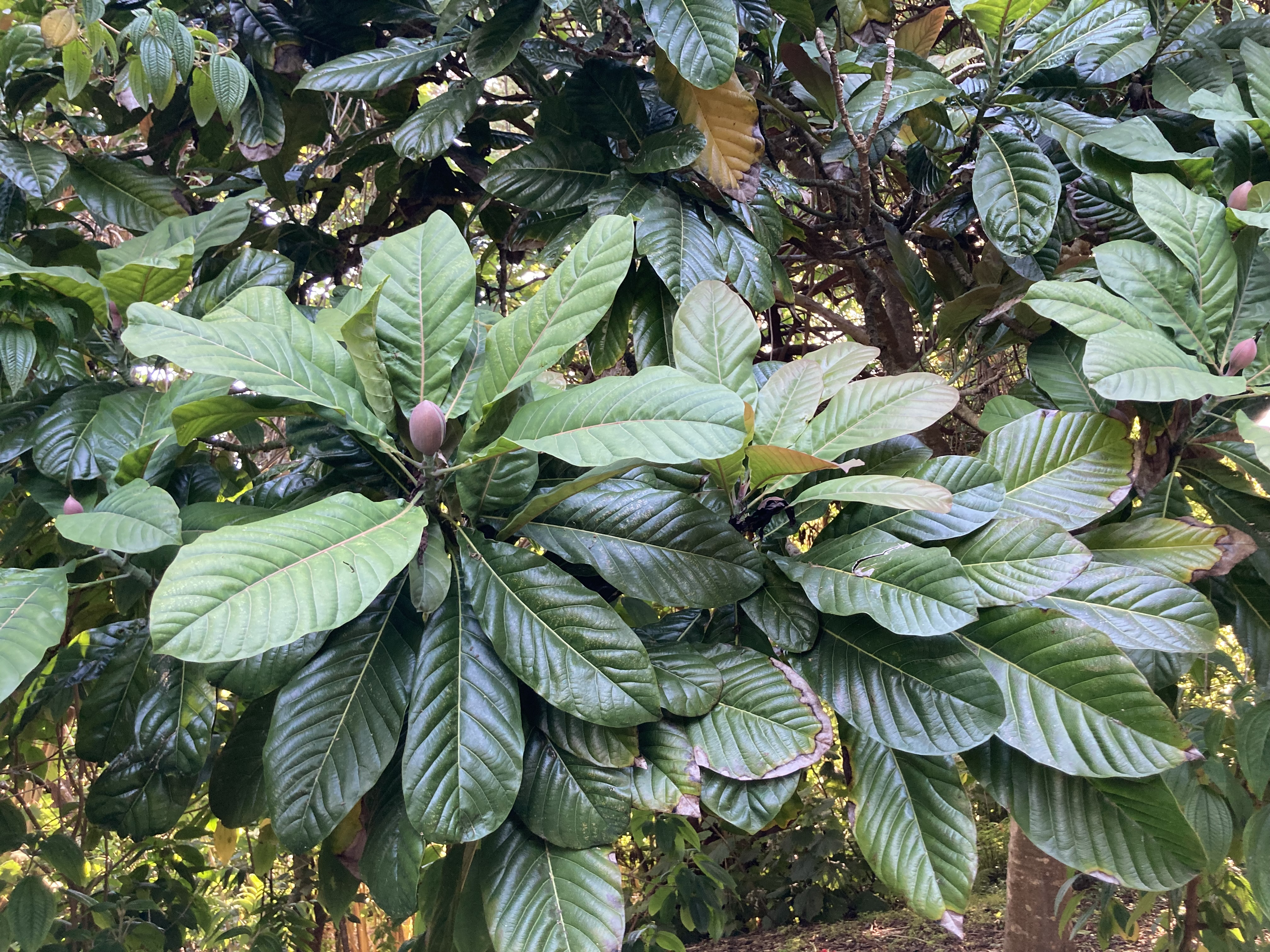
M. hodgsonii leaves

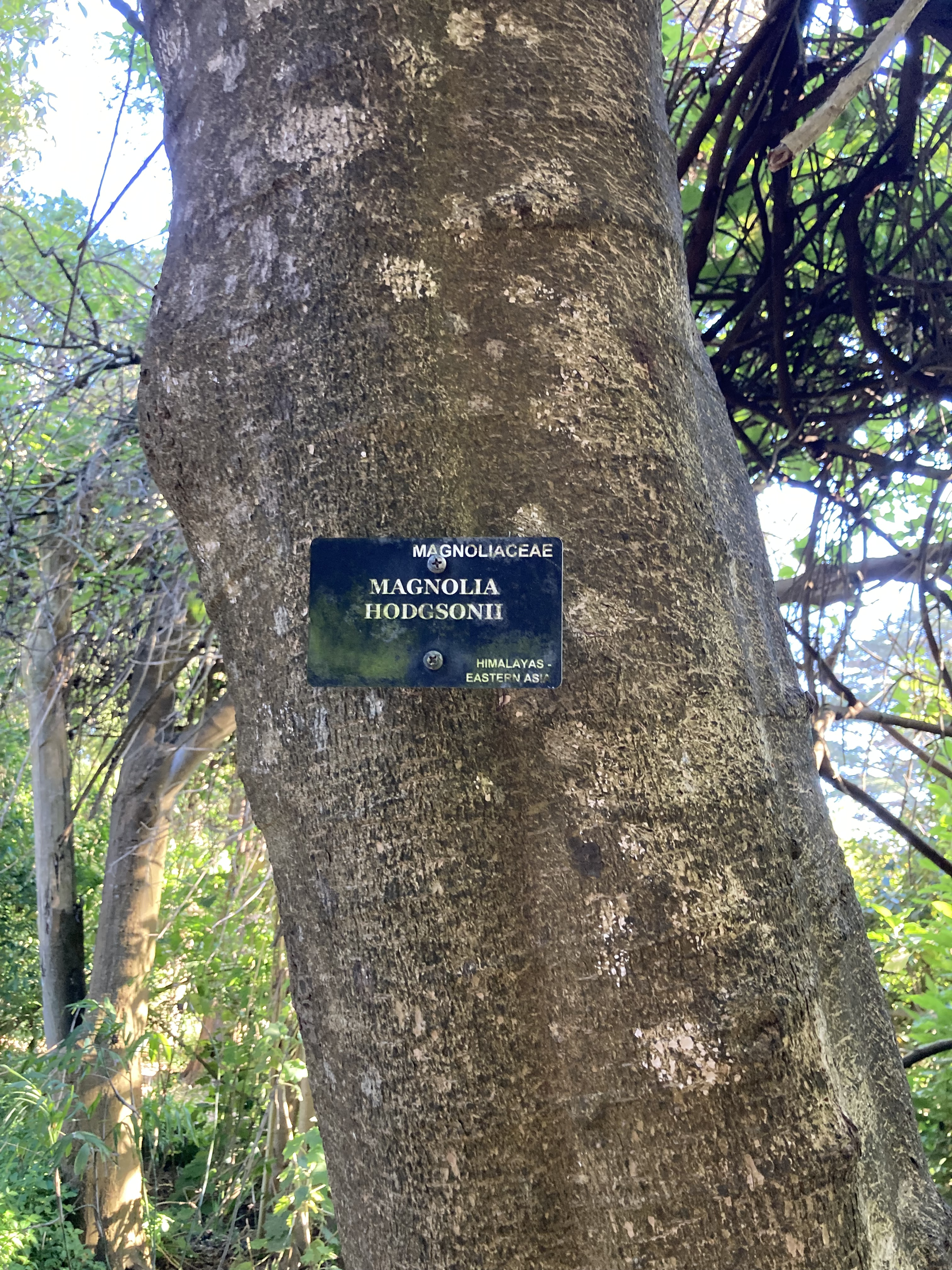
M. hodgsonii bark
