= Archibald Campbell (doctor) =

British Medical Serviceman and Biologist (1805-1874)

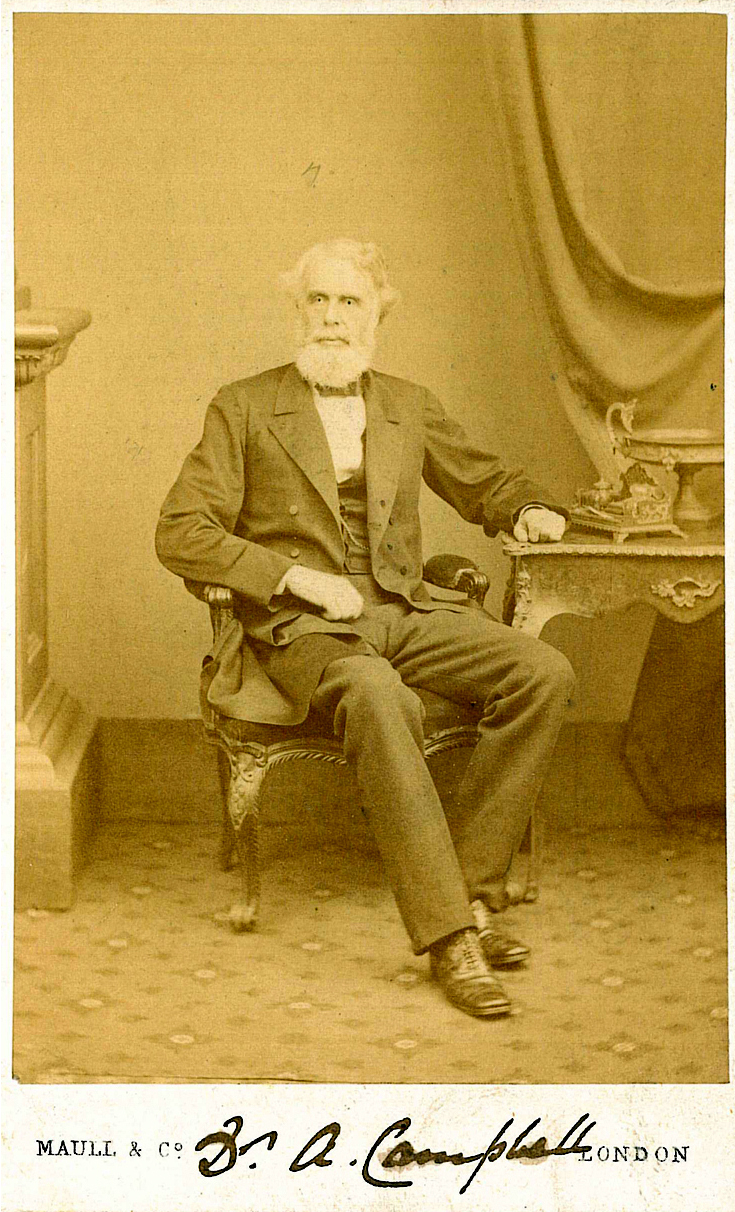
Undated Carte de visite from the Royal Anthropological Institute of Great Britain and Ireland

Archibald Campbell (20 April 1805 – 5 November 1874) of the Bengal Medical Service (which became part the Indian Medical Service after 1857) was the first superintendent (1840-1862) of the sanatorium town of Darjeeling in north east India. He also took a great interest in ethnology, economic botany and the study of the region and wrote extensively in the Journal of the Asiatic Society of Bengal under the name of "Dr Campbell" or "Dr A. Campbell" which has led some authors to misidentify his first name as Arthur or even Andrew. Campbell is credited with the introduction of tea cultivation in Darjeeling and for playing a role in the early experiments on the cultivation of Cinchona. Campbell corresponded with numerous naturalists including B.H. Hodgson and Sir Joseph Hooker. The latter travelled around Sikkim with Campbell on an expedition in which the two were held prisoner by Tsugphud Namgyal, the local ruler. This incident led to the British annexation of the Sikkim Terai region.

== Life and career ==
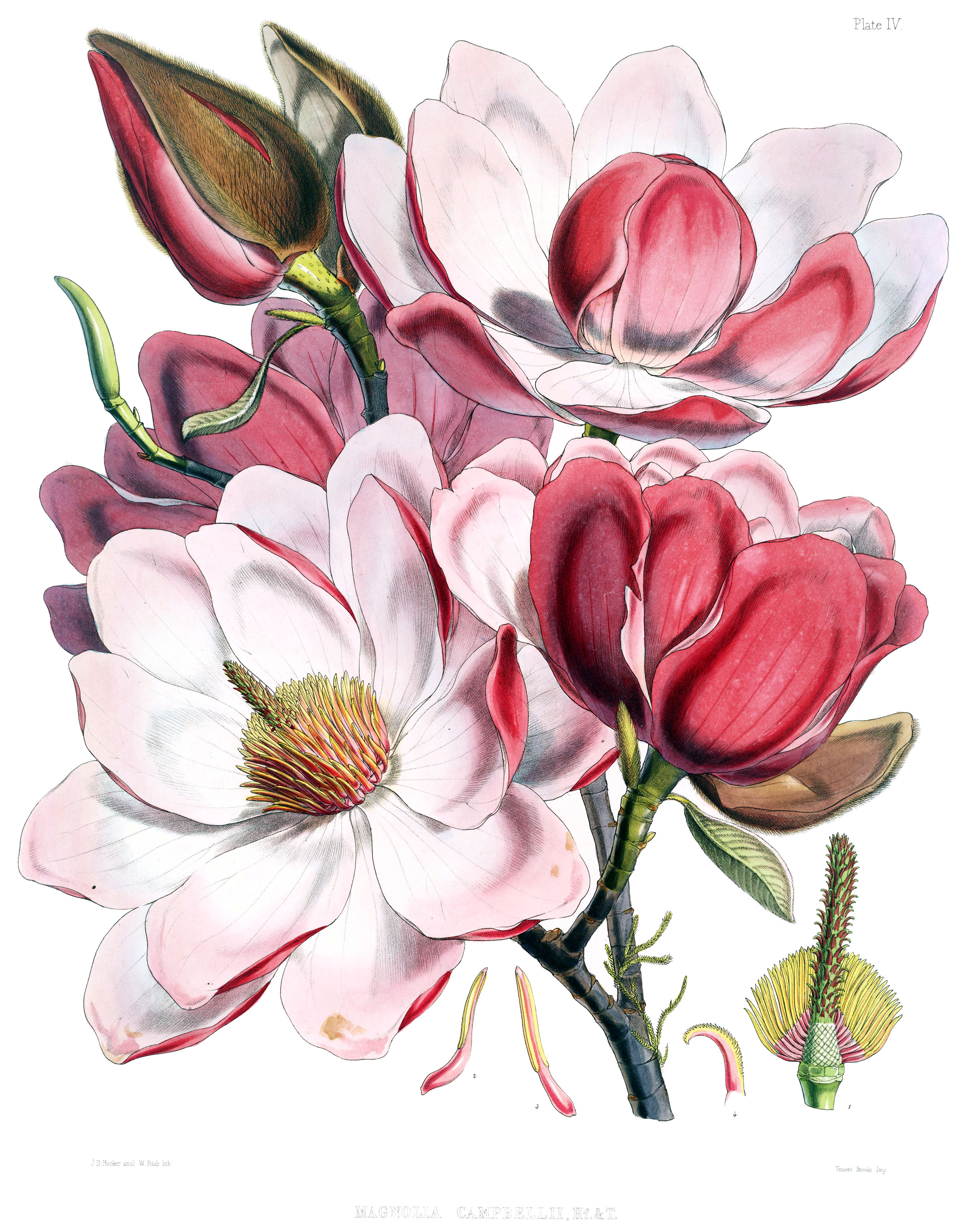
Magnolia campbellii named after Campbell by Hooker

Archibald Campbell was born at Kilciarain, Kildalton, Port Ellen on the Island of Islay to his namesake father Lieutenant Archibald Campbell of Ardmore and his wife Helen. He studied at Glasgow and later from 1824 to 1827 at Edinburgh University where he graduated M.D. He joined the Bengal medical establishment of the East India Company service on 8 May 1827 and rose to the position of Surgeon on 16 January 1844. In 1828 he was posted to the horse artillery at Meerut sometimes serving at the then recently established European Convalescent Depot at Landour. In 1832 he became surgeon at Kathmandu in Nepal serving under Brian Hodgson who influenced him greatly. He was made Superintendent of Darjeeling from 1840 and he stayed in this position until his retirement on 8 February 1862.

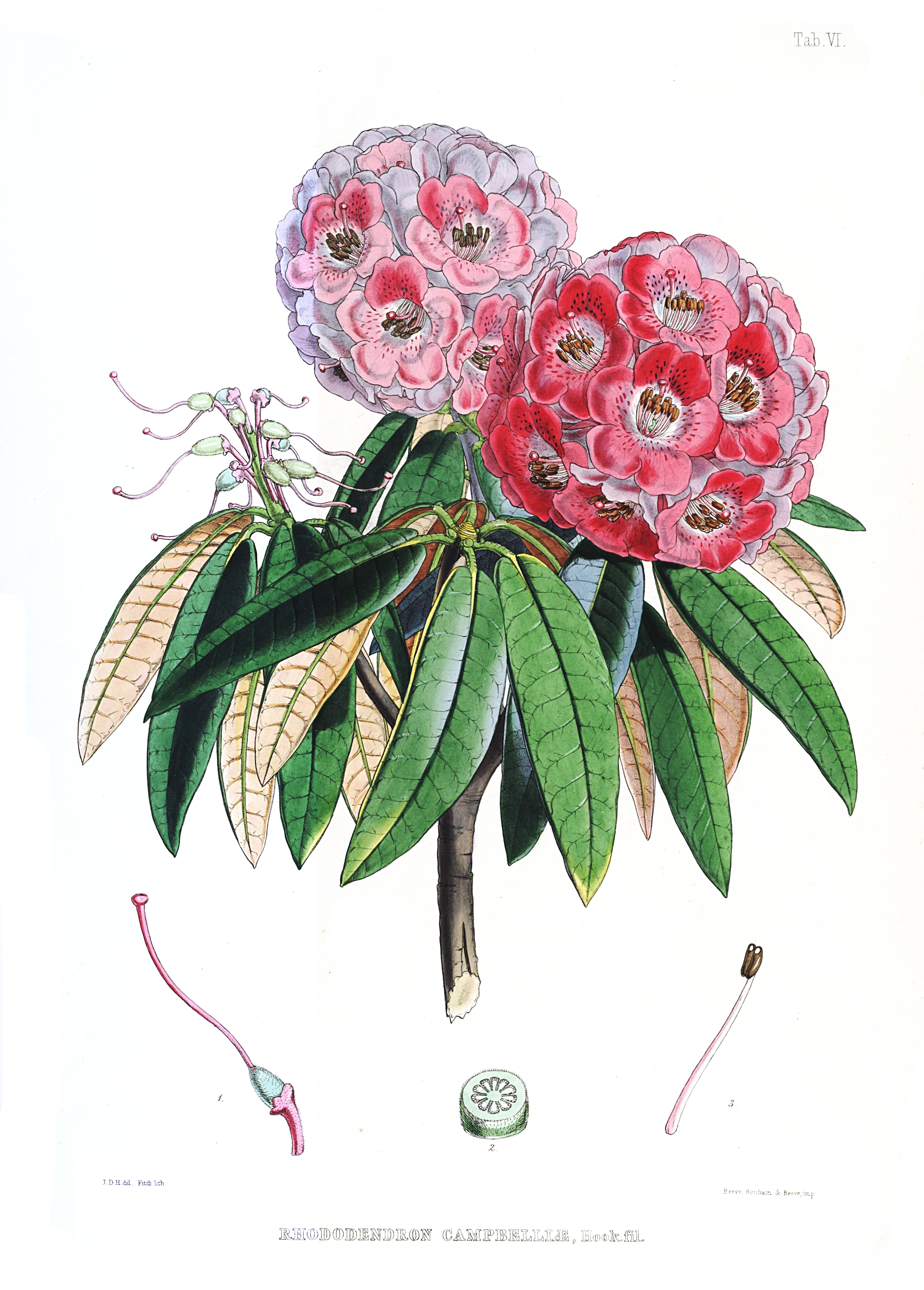
Rhododendron campbelliae named after Mrs Campbell by Hooker

Campbell collaborated with naturalists like Brian Hodgson who worked in Nepal as well as visiting botanists like Sir Joseph Hooker. He accompanied Hooker in Sikkim along with Chibu Lama who knew the area and the three were taken prisoner on 7 November 1849 by Namgay, a dewan or minister of the Raja of Sikkim and held prisoner at Tumlung. Hooker was allowed to leave but he chose to stay with Campbell. The two were released without harm on 9 December but the outrage led the British Government of India to annex a part of the Sikkim Terai region and stop the annual payment of Rs 3,000 to the Sikkim Raja as rent for Darjeeling.

According to Hooker, the Darjeeling region was inhabited by five tribes, the Lepchas, Moormis, Tibetans, Limboos and Mechis who had been harassed by the Bhutanese and Nepalis. According to him, it was Lord Auckland's desire to reconcile these elements to make Sikkim a commercial centre under British rule. Campbell was chosen to achieve these ends. Campbell took various measures for the economic development of the region that led to a population increase from less than 100 in 1839 to around 10,000 in 1849, swelled by immigrants from Nepal, Sikkim and Bhutan. By 1852, Campbell had organised the construction of 70 European style houses, a bazaar and jail along with roads. Forced labour was abolished and more the Rs. 50,000 had been raised in revenue. He was very interested in economic botany and brought tea seeds from the Kumaun region and in 1841, he began to grow some tea on an experimental basis near his home at Beechwood, Darjeeling. His experiments were followed by several others, and soon, tea began to be cultivated in the area as Darjeeling tea. He also took a lead in testing sea-island cotton cultivation in the Terai as well as the culture of Tassar silk. Campbell also attempted to grow the first few samples of Cinchona brought to India from Kew in 1834 by Robert Fortune. These plants, however, did not survive the winter.

He retired on 8 February 1862 and returned in 1872 to his home in Slough where he worked with the Orphan Asylum and local institutions. He attended the International Congress of Orientalists in 1874 and came down with an illness shortly after and died at his home. He was buried at Upton.

Campbell married Emily Ann the second daughter of John Lamb of the Bengal Medical Service at Darjeeling on 10 November 1841 (Emily Ann is reported under aged at the time of marriage) and they had twelve children of whom nine survived him. The magnolia species, Magnolia campbellii, was named after him by Hooker.

== Publications ==
Campbell wrote many papers on Himalayan geography, ethnology and natural history. A partial list of his publications include:

- Observations on the Goitre in Animals as it occurs in Nipal. Medical and Physiological Society, 1833.
- On the Agriculture and Rural Economy of the Valley of Nipal. Journal of the Agricultural and Horticultural Society of India. v. 4, 1837.
- On the Agricultural and other Implements used in the Valley of Nipal. Journal of the Agricultural and Horticultural Society of India. v. 4, 1837.
- On the state of the Arts of Weaving, Spinning, and Dyeing in the Valley of Nipal. Journal of the Agricultural and Horticultural Society of India. v. 4, 1837.
- On the Musical Instruments of the Nipalese. Journal of the Agricultural and Horticultural Society of India. v. 4, 1837.
- Barometrical and Thermometrical Observations at Cathmandoo in 1837. India Review.
- On the Proboscis of the Elephant. India Review.
- On Earthquakes in Nipal and Thibet in 1833. Journal of the Asiatic Society.
- On the Mech Tribe of Sikim, with Vocabulary of their Language, &c. Journal of the Asiatic Society.
- On the Lepchas of Sikim, with Vocabulary, &c., &c. Journal of the Asiatic Society. in Journal of the Anthropological Institute, 1873.
- On the Limboos of Nipal and Sikim, with Vocabulary, &c., &c.Ditto, ditto, Journal of the Ethnological Society, 1869.
- On the Moormis of Nipal and Sikim.
- On the Haioos of Nipal and Sikim.
- Note on the Origin and Language of the Limboos. Journal of the Asiatic Society.
- On the Comparative Anatomy of the Dog and the Wild Dog, Buansu of Nipal. Journal of the Natural History.
- On the Comparative Anatomy of the Ox, Bison, and Gavial. Journal of the Natural History.
- A Gardener's Calendar for Darjeeling. Journal of the Agricultural and Horticultural Society, 1840.
- On the Manufacture of Paper from the Bark of the Daphne Cannabina, vol. v. Journal of the Agricultural Society of Calcutta.
- On the Soils and Cultivation round Darjeeling.
- On the Cultivation of the Tea Plant at Darjeeling, 1846.
- On the Pooah Fibre, or Hemp of Nipal and Sikim, from a species of Nettle. Journal of the Agricultural Society, 1847.
- On a Lime Deposit in Sikim, 1843.
- Proposal for an interchange of Agricultural Seeds between different districts in India. Journal of the Agricultural Society, 1848.
- Itinerary from Phari in Thibet to Lassa,1848. Published in Phari. Journal of the Asiatic Society.
- Routes from Darjeeling to Thibet, 1848. Journal of the Asiatic Society.
- On the Elevation of Peaks in the Himalaya, 1848. Journal of the Asiatic Society.
- Journal of a Trip to Sikim in December, 1848, with a Map.
- On Winds and Storms in Thibet, 1851. Journal of the Asiatic Society.
- Report on the Sikim Morung 1851. Published by the Government of Bengal.
- On the Cultivation of Cotton in the Morung. Published by the Government of Bengal.
- Diary of a Journey through Sikim to the confines of Thibet, in 1849-50. Journal of the Asiatic Society.
- Report on Copper Ores in the Darjeeling Territory, 1854.
- Notes on Eastern Thibet, with a Chart, 1855, Phari. No. 1, February 1871. Journal of the Asiatic Society.
- Note on the Limboo Language, with an Alphabet, 1855. Journal of the Asiatic Society.
- Paper on the Joshues. Journal of the Anthropological Institute, March 1873.
- Sketch of Political Relations between the Bengal Government and Sikim to 1861, with supplement to 1874. January, 1874. Oriental.
- Paper on the Commerce of India. Journal of the Society of Arts, 17 March 1871.
- Note on the Valley of Choombi. Royal Asiatic Society, Great Britain and Ireland, September 1873.
- Paper on Indian Teas, and Importance of extending their adoption in Home Market. Society of Arts Journal, 30 January 1874.
